= List of 1980 motorsport champions =

1980 motorsport champions
Previous: 1979	Next: 1981

This list of 1980 motorsport champions is a list of national or international auto racing series with a Championship decided by the points or positions earned by a driver from multiple races.

== Dirt oval racing ==
Series	Champion	Refer
World of Outlaws Sprint Car Series	(United States) Steve Kinser	
World of Outlaws Sprint Car Series	Teams: (United States) Karl Kinser Racing	

== Drag racing ==
Series	Champion	Refer
NHRA Winston Drag Racing Series	Top Fuel: (United States) Shirley Muldowney	1980 NHRA Winston Drag Racing Series
NHRA Winston Drag Racing Series	Funny Car: (United States) Raymond Beadle	1980 NHRA Winston Drag Racing Series
NHRA Winston Drag Racing Series	Pro Stock: (United States) Bob Glidden	1980 NHRA Winston Drag Racing Series

== Karting ==
Series	Driver	Season article
Karting World Championship	(Netherlands) Peter De Bruijn	
Karting World Championship	Junior: (Germany) Bernd Schneider	
Karting European Championship	100cc: (Austria) Toni Zöserl	
Karting European Championship	FC: (Germany) Frank Leuze	
Karting European Championship	FC-2: (Czech Republic) Milan Simak	

== Motorcycle racing ==
Series	Driver	Season article
500cc World Championship	(United States) Kenny Roberts	1980 Grand Prix motorcycle racing season
350cc World Championship	(South Africa) Jon Ekerold	1980 Grand Prix motorcycle racing season
250cc World Championship	(West Germany) Anton Mang	1980 Grand Prix motorcycle racing season
125cc World Championship	(Italy) Pier Paolo Bianchi	1980 Grand Prix motorcycle racing season
50cc World Championship	(Italy) Eugenio Lazzarini	1980 Grand Prix motorcycle racing season
Speedway World Championship	(England) Michael Lee	1980 Individual Speedway World Championship
AMA Superbike Championship	(United States) Wes Cooley	
Australian Superbike Series	(Australia) Andrew Johnson	

== Open wheel racing ==
Series	Driver	Season article
Formula One World Championship	(Australia) Alan Jones	1980 Formula One season
Formula One World Championship	Constructors: (United Kingdom) Williams-Ford	1980 Formula One season
British Formula One Championship	(Spain) Emilio de Villota	1980 British Formula One Championship
South African National Drivers Championship	(South Africa) Tony Martin	1980 South African National Drivers Championship
CART PPG Indy Car World Series	(United States) Johnny Rutherford	1980 CART PPG Indy Car World Series
CART PPG Indy Car World Series	Manufacturers: (United Kingdom) Cosworth	1980 CART PPG Indy Car World Series
CART PPG Indy Car World Series	Rookies: (Australia) Dennis Firestone	1980 CART PPG Indy Car World Series
USAC Mini-Indy Series	(United States) Peter Kuhn	1980 USAC Mini-Indy Series season
Australian Drivers' Championship	(Australia) Alfredo Costanzo	1980 Australian Drivers' Championship
Cup of Peace and Friendship	(East Germany) Ulli Melkus	1980 Cup of Peace and Friendship
Cup of Peace and Friendship	Nations: Czechoslovakia	1980 Cup of Peace and Friendship
Formula Atlantic	(Canada) Jacques Villeneuve	1980 Formula Atlantic season
Formula Nacional	(Spain) Enrique Llobell	1980 Formula Nacional
Formula Renault Argentina	(Argentina) Víctor Rosso	1980 Formula Renault Argentina
SCCA Formula Super Vee	(United States) Peter Kuhn	1980 SCCA Formula Super Vee season
Formula Two
Australian Formula 2	(Australia) Richard Davison	1980 Australian Formula 2 Championship
European Formula Two Championship	(United Kingdom) Brian Henton	1980 European Formula Two Championship
All-Japan Formula Two Championship	(Japan) Masahiro Hasemi	1980 All-Japan Formula Two Championship
Formula Three
FIA European Formula 3 Championship	(Italy) Michele Alboreto	1980 FIA European Formula 3 Championship
FIA European Formula 3 Championship	Teams: (Italy) Euroracing	1980 FIA European Formula 3 Championship
All-Japan Formula Three Championship	(Japan) Shuroko Sasaki	1980 All-Japan Formula Three Championship
All-Japan Formula Three Championship	Teams: (Japan) Gallop Racing	1980 All-Japan Formula Three Championship
British Formula Three Championship	(Sweden) Stefan Johansson	1980 British Formula Three Championship
Chilean Formula Three Championship	(Chile) Juan Carlos Ridolfi	1980 Chilean Formula Three Championship
French Formula Three Championship	(France) Alain Ferté	1980 French Formula Three Championship
German Formula Three Championship	(West Germany) Frank Jelinski	1980 German Formula Three Championship
Italian Formula Three Championship	(Italy) Guido Pardini	1980 Italian Formula Three Championship
Italian Formula Three Championship	Teams: (Italy) Scuderia Emiliani	1980 Italian Formula Three Championship
Soviet Formula 3 Championship	(Estonian Soviet Socialist Republic) Toivo Asmer	1980 Soviet Formula 3 Championship
Swiss Formula Three Championship	(Switzerland) Jakob Bordoli	1980 Swiss Formula Three Championship
Formula Renault
French Formula Renault Championship	(France) Denis Morin	1980 French Formula Renault Championship
Formula Ford
Australian Formula Ford Championship	(Australia) Stephen Brook	1980 Australian Formula Ford Championship
Brazilian Formula Ford Championship	(Brazil) Arthur Bragantini	1980 Brazilian Formula Ford Championship
British Formula Ford Championship	(Republic of Ireland) Tommy Byrne	1980 British Formula Ford Championship
Danish Formula Ford Championship	(Denmark) Jesper Villumsen	
Formula Ford 1600 Netherlands	(Netherlands) Jim Vermeulen	1980 Formula Ford 1600 Netherlands
EFDA Formula Ford 2000 Championship	(Netherlands) Fred Krab	
European Formula Ford Championship	(Sweden) Bo Martinsson	1980 European Formula Ford Championship
German Formula Ford Championship	(Austria) Gero Zamagna	1980 German Formula Ford Championship
Irish Formula Ford Championship	(Republic of Ireland) Maurice Dunne	1980 Irish Formula Ford Championship
New Zealand Formula Ford Championship	(New Zealand) Mike King	1980 New Zealand Formula Ford Championship
Scottish Formula Ford Championship	(United Kingdom) Tom Brown	
Swedish Formula Ford Championship	(Sweden) Thorbjörn Carlsson	1980 Swedish Formula Ford Championship

== Rallying ==
Series	Driver	Season article
World Rally Championship	(West Germany) Walter Röhrl	1980 World Rally Championship
World Rally Championship	Co-Drivers: (Germany) Christian Geistdörfer	1980 World Rally Championship
World Rally Championship	Manufacturers: (Italy) Fiat	1980 World Rally Championship
Australian Rally Championship	(Australia) George Fury	1980 Australian Rally Championship
Australian Rally Championship	Co-Drivers: (Australia) Monty Suffern	1980 Australian Rally Championship
British Rally Championship	(Finland) Ari Vatanen	1980 British Rally Championship
British Rally Championship	Co-Drivers: (United Kingdom) David Richards	1980 British Rally Championship
Canadian Rally Championship	(Finland) Taisto Heinonen	1980 Canadian Rally Championship
Canadian Rally Championship	Co-Drivers: (Canada) Tom Burgess	1980 Canadian Rally Championship
Deutsche Rallye Meisterschaft	(Germany) Achim Warmbold	
Estonian Rally Championship	(Estonian Soviet Socialist Republic) Toonart Rääsk	1980 Estonian Rally Championship
Estonian Rally Championship	Co-Drivers: (Estonian Soviet Socialist Republic) Lehar Linno	1980 Estonian Rally Championship
European Rally Championship	(Spain) Antonio Zanini	1980 European Rally Championship
European Rally Championship	Co-Drivers: (Spain) Jordi Sabater	1980 European Rally Championship
Finnish Rally Championship	Group 1: (Finland) Mikael Sundström	1980 Finnish Rally Championship
Finnish Rally Championship	Group 2: (Finland) Kyösti Hämäläinen	1980 Finnish Rally Championship
French Rally Championship	(France) Jean Ragnotti	
Hungarian Rally Championship	(Hungary) Attila Ferjáncz	
Hungarian Rally Championship	Co-Drivers: (Hungary) János Tandari	
Italian Rally Championship	(Italy) Adartico Vudafieri	
Italian Rally Championship	Co-Drivers: (Italy) Fabio Penariol	
Italian Rally Championship	Manufacturers: (Italy) Fiat	
New Zealand Rally Championship	(New Zealand) Jim Donald	1980 New Zealand Rally Championship
Polish Rally Championship	(Poland) Maciej Stawowiak	
Romanian Rally Championship	(Romania) Mircea Ilioaea	
Scottish Rally Championship	(United Kingdom) Drew Gallacher	
Scottish Rally Championship	Co-Drivers: (United Kingdom) John Eyres	
South African National Rally Championship	(South Africa) Sarel van der Merwe	
South African National Rally Championship	Co-Drivers: (South Africa) Franz Boshoff	
South African National Rally Championship	Manufacturers: (Japan) Nissan	
Spanish Rally Championship	(Spain) Antonio Zanini	
Spanish Rally Championship	Co-Drivers: (Spain) Víctor Sabater	

=== Rallycross ===
Series	Driver	Season article
FIA European Rallycross Championship	TC: (Sweden) Per-Inge Walfridsson	
FIA European Rallycross Championship	GT: (Sweden) Olle Arnesson	
British Rallycross Championship	(United Kingdom) Graham Hathaway	

== Sports car and GT ==
Series	Driver	Season article
World Sportscar Championship	+2.0: (West Germany) Porsche; 2.0: (Italy) Lancia	1980 World Sportscar Championship
Australian Sports Car Championship	(Canada) Allan Moffat	1980 Australian Sports Car Championship
Australian Sports Sedan Championship	(Australia) Tony Edmonson	1980 Australian Sports Sedan Championship
Can-Am	(France) Patrick Tambay	1980 Can-Am season
Fuji Grand Champion Series	(Japan) Masahiro Hasemi	1980 Fuji Grand Champion Series
IMSA GT Championship	(United States) Peter Gregg	1980 IMSA GT Championship season
Trans-Am Series	(United States) John Bauer	1980 Trans-Am Series
Trans-Am Series	Manufacturers: (United States) Chevrolet	1980 Trans-Am Series

== Stock car racing ==
Series	Driver	Season article
NASCAR Winston Cup Series	(United States) Dale Earnhardt	1980 NASCAR Winston Cup Series
NASCAR Winston Cup Series	Manufacturers: (United States) Chevrolet	1980 NASCAR Winston Cup Series
NASCAR Winston West Series	(United States) Roy Smith	1980 NASCAR Winston West Series
ARCA Racing Series	(United States) Bob Dotter	1980 ARCA Racing Series
Turismo Carretera	(Argentina) Francisco Espinosa	1979–1980 Turismo Carretera
USAC Stock Car National Championship	(United States) Joe Ruttman	1980 USAC Stock Car National Championship

== Touring car ==
Series	Driver	Season article
European Touring Car Championship	(Germany) Helmut Kelleners (Germany) Siegfried Müller Jr.	1980 European Touring Car Championship
Australian Touring Car Championship	(Australia) Peter Brock	1980 Australian Touring Car Championship
British Saloon Car Championship	(United Kingdom) Win Percy	1980 British Saloon Car Championship
Championnat de France de Supertourisme	(France) Dany Snobeck	1980 Championnat de France de Supertourisme
Deutsche Rennsport Meisterschaft	(Germany) Hans Heyer	1980 Deutsche Rennsport Meisterschaft
Stock Car Brasil	(Brazil) Ingo Hoffmann	1980 Stock Car Brasil season
TC2000 Championship	(Argentina) Jorge Omar del Río	1980 TC2000 Championship

== See also ==
- List of motorsport championships
- Auto racing
