= List of 1982 motorsport champions =

1982 motorsport champions
Previous: 1981	Next: 1983

This list of 1982 motorsport champions is a list of national or international auto racing series with a Championship decided by the points or positions earned by a driver from multiple races.

== Dirt oval racing ==
Series	Champion	Refer
World of Outlaws Sprint Car Series	(United States) Sammy Swindell	
World of Outlaws Sprint Car Series	Teams: (United States) Nance Speed Equipment	

== Drag racing ==
Series	Champion	Refer
NHRA Winston Drag Racing Series	Top Fuel: (United States) Shirley Muldowney	1982 NHRA Winston Drag Racing Series
NHRA Winston Drag Racing Series	Funny Car: (United States) Frank Hawley	1982 NHRA Winston Drag Racing Series
NHRA Winston Drag Racing Series	Pro Stock: (United States) Lee Shepherd	1982 NHRA Winston Drag Racing Series

== Karting ==
Series	Driver	Season article
CIK-FIA Karting World Championship	(United Kingdom) Mike Wilson	
CIK-FIA Junior World Cup	(Italy) Romeo Deila	
Karting European Championship	FK: (Netherlands) Peter De Bruijn	
Karting European Championship	FC: (Italy) Alessandro Piccini	
Karting European Championship	ICC: (Italy) Mario Bertuzzi	
Karting European Championship	ICA: (Germany) Josef Bertzen	

== Motorcycle racing ==
Series	Driver	Season article
500cc World Championship	(Italy) Franco Uncini	1982 Grand Prix motorcycle racing season
350cc World Championship	(West Germany) Anton Mang	1982 Grand Prix motorcycle racing season
250cc World Championship	(France) Jean-Louis Tournadre	1982 Grand Prix motorcycle racing season
125cc World Championship	(Spain) Ángel Nieto	1982 Grand Prix motorcycle racing season
80cc World Championship	(Switzerland) Stefan Dörflinger	1982 Grand Prix motorcycle racing season
Speedway World Championship	(United States) Bruce Penhall	1982 Individual Speedway World Championship
AMA Superbike Championship	(United States) Eddie Lawson	
Australian Superbike Series	(Australia) Rob Phillis	

== Open wheel racing ==
Series	Driver	Season article
FIA Formula One World Championship	(Finland) Keke Rosberg	1982 Formula One World Championship
FIA Formula One World Championship	Constructors: (Italy) Ferrari	1982 Formula One World Championship
CART PPG Indy Car World Series	(United States) Rick Mears	1982 CART PPG Indy Car World Series
CART PPG Indy Car World Series	Manufacturers: (United Kingdom) Cosworth	1982 CART PPG Indy Car World Series
CART PPG Indy Car World Series	Rookies: (United States) Bobby Rahal	1982 CART PPG Indy Car World Series
European Formula Two Championship	(Italy) Corrado Fabi	1982 European Formula Two Championship
British Formula One Championship	(United Kingdom) Jim Crawford	1982 British Formula One Championship
All-Japan Formula Two Championship	(Japan) Satoru Nakajima	1982 All-Japan Formula Two Championship
Australian Drivers' Championship	(Australia) Alfredo Costanzo	1982 Australian Drivers' Championship
Australian Formula 2 Championship	(Australia) Lucio Cesario	1982 Australian Formula 2 Championship
Formula Atlantic	(New Zealand) Dave McMillan	1982 Formula Atlantic season
Cup of Peace and Friendship	(Czechoslovakia) Jan Veselý	1982 Cup of Peace and Friendship
Cup of Peace and Friendship	Nations: Czechoslovakia	1982 Cup of Peace and Friendship
Formula Nacional	(Spain) Ramón Rodríguez	1982 Formula Nacional
National Panasonic Series	(Australia) Charlie O'Brien	1982 National Panasonic Series
SCCA Formula Super Vee	(United States) Michael Andretti	1982 SCCA Formula Super Vee season
South African National Drivers Championship	(South Africa) Graham Duxbury	1982 South African National Drivers Championship
Formula Three
FIA European Formula 3 Championship	(Argentina) Oscar Larrauri	1982 FIA European Formula 3 Championship
All-Japan Formula Three Championship	(Japan) Kengo Nakamoto	1982 All-Japan Formula Three Championship
All-Japan Formula Three Championship	Teams: (Japan) Hayashi Racing	1982 All-Japan Formula Three Championship
Austria Formula 3 Cup	(Austria) Johann Reindl	1982 Austria Formula 3 Cup
British Formula Three Championship	(Republic of Ireland) Tommy Byrne	1982 British Formula Three Championship
Chilean Formula Three Championship	(Chile) Juan Carlos Ridolfi	1982 Chilean Formula Three Championship
French Formula Three Championship	(France) Pierre Petit	1982 French Formula Three Championship
French Formula Three Championship	Teams: (United Kingdom) David Price Racing	1982 French Formula Three Championship
German Formula Three Championship	(Denmark) John Nielsen	1982 German Formula Three Championship
Italian Formula Three Championship	(Italy) Enzo Coloni	1982 Italian Formula Three Championship
Italian Formula Three Championship	Teams: (Italy) Coloni Racing	1982 Italian Formula Three Championship
Soviet Formula 3 Championship	(Estonian Soviet Socialist Republic) Toomas Napa	1982 Soviet Formula 3 Championship
Swiss Formula Three Championship	(Switzerland) Jo Zeller	1982 Swiss Formula Three Championship
Formula Renault
French Formula Renault Championship	(France) Gilles Lempereur	1982 French Formula Renault Championship
Formula Renault Argentina	(Argentina) Roberto Urretavizcaya	1982 Formula Renault Argentina
Formula Ford
Australian Formula Ford Championship	(Australia) Jeff Summers	1982 TAA Formula Ford Driver to Europe Series
Brazilian Formula Ford Championship	(Brazil) Egon Herzfeldt	1982 Brazilian Formula Ford Championship
British Formula Ford Championship	(Brazil) Maurício Gugelmin	1982 British Formula Ford Championship
British Formula Ford 2000 Championship	(Brazil) Ayrton Senna	
Danish Formula Ford Championship	(Denmark) Klaus Pedersen	
Dutch Formula Ford 1600 Championship	(Netherlands) Gerrit van Kouwen	1982 Dutch Formula Ford 1600 Championship
EFDA Formula Ford 2000 Championship	(Brazil) Ayrton Senna	
European Formula Ford Championship	(Germany) Volker Weidler	1982 European Formula Ford Championship
German Formula Ford Championship	(Germany) Volker Weidler	1982 German Formula Ford Championship
New Zealand Formula Ford Championship	(New Zealand) Mike King	1981–82 New Zealand Formula Ford Championship
Scottish Formula Ford Championship	(United Kingdom) Vic Covey	
Swedish Formula Ford Championship	(Sweden) Thorbjörn Carlsson	

== Rallying ==
Series	Driver	Season article
World Rally Championship	(West Germany) Walter Röhrl	1982 World Rally Championship
World Rally Championship	Co-Drivers: (Germany) Christian Geistdörfer	1982 World Rally Championship
World Rally Championship	Manufacturers: (West Germany) Audi	1982 World Rally Championship
African Rally Championship	(Germany) Walter Röhrl	1982 African Rally Championship
Australian Rally Championship	(Australia) Geoff Portman	1982 Australian Rally Championship
Australian Rally Championship	Co-Drivers: (Australia) Ross Runnalls	1982 Australian Rally Championship
British Rally Championship	(United Kingdom) Jimmy McRae	1982 British Rally Championship
British Rally Championship	Co-Drivers: (United Kingdom) Ian Grindrod	1982 British Rally Championship
Canadian Rally Championship	(Finland) Taisto Heinonen	1982 Canadian Rally Championship
Canadian Rally Championship	Co-Drivers: (Canada) Tom Burgess	1982 Canadian Rally Championship
Deutsche Rallye Meisterschaft	(Germany) Harald Demuth	
Estonian Rally Championship	(Estonian Soviet Socialist Republic) Ando Nõel	1982 Estonian Rally Championship
Estonian Rally Championship	Co-Drivers: (Estonian Soviet Socialist Republic) Rein Talvar	1982 Estonian Rally Championship
European Rally Championship	(Italy) Antonio Fassina	1982 European Rally Championship
European Rally Championship	Co-Drivers: (Italy) Roberto Dalpozzo	1982 European Rally Championship
Finnish Rally Championship	Group 1: (Finland) Harri Väänänen	1982 Finnish Rally Championship
Finnish Rally Championship	Group 2: (Finland) Kyösti Hämäläinen	1982 Finnish Rally Championship
French Rally Championship	(France) Jean-Luc Thérier	
Hungarian Rally Championship	(Hungary) Attila Ferjáncz	
Hungarian Rally Championship	Co-Drivers: (Hungary) János Tandari	
Italian Rally Championship	(Italy) Antonio Tognana	
Italian Rally Championship	Co-Drivers: (Italy) Massimo De Antoni	
Italian Rally Championship	Manufacturers: (Italy) Lancia	
New Zealand Rally Championship	(New Zealand) Tony Teesdale	1982 New Zealand Rally Championship
Polish Rally Championship	(Poland) Andrzej Koper	
Romanian Rally Championship	(Romania) Ludovic Balint	
Scottish Rally Championship	(United Kingdom) Ken Wood	
Scottish Rally Championship	Co-Drivers: (United Kingdom) Peter Brown	
South African National Rally Championship	(South Africa) Sarel van der Merwe	
South African National Rally Championship	Co-Drivers: (South Africa) Franz Boshoff	
South African National Rally Championship	Manufacturers: (Japan) Toyota	
Spanish Rally Championship	(Spain) Antonio Zanini	
Spanish Rally Championship	Co-Drivers: (Spain) Víctor Sabater	

=== Rallycross ===
Series	Driver	Season article
FIA European Rallycross Championship	Div 1: (Norway) Egil Stenshagen	
FIA European Rallycross Championship	Div 2: (Austria) Franz Wurz	
British Rallycross Championship	(United Kingdom) Keith Ripp	

== Sports car and GT ==
Series	Driver	Season article
World Sportscar Championship	C1: (Belgium) Jacky Ickx	1982 World Sportscar Championship
World Sportscar Championship	Constructors: (West Germany) Porsche	1982 World Sportscar Championship
IMSA GT Championship	GTX: (United States) John Paul Jr.	1982 IMSA GT Championship
IMSA GT Championship	GTO: (United States) Don Devendorf	1982 IMSA GT Championship
IMSA GT Championship	GTU: (United States) Jim Downing	1982 IMSA GT Championship
Australian GT Championship	(Australia) Alan Jones	1982 Australian GT Championship
Australian Sports Car Championship	(Australia) Chris Clearihan	1982 Australian Sports Car Championship

== Stock car racing ==
Series	Driver	Season article
NASCAR Winston Cup Series	(United States) Darrell Waltrip	1982 NASCAR Winston Cup Series
NASCAR Winston Cup Series	Manufacturers: (United States) Buick	1982 NASCAR Winston Cup Series
NASCAR Budweiser Late Model Sportsman Series	(United States) Jack Ingram	1982 NASCAR Budweiser Late Model Sportsman Series
NASCAR Budweiser Late Model Sportsman Series	Manufacturers: (United States) Pontiac	1982 NASCAR Budweiser Late Model Sportsman Series
NASCAR Winston West Series	(United States) Roy Smith	1982 NASCAR Winston West Series
ARCA Racing Series	(United States) Scott Stovall	1982 ARCA Racing Series
Turismo Carretera	(Argentina) Jorge Martínez Boero	1982 Turismo Carretera
USAC Stock Car National Championship	(United States) Dean Roper	1982 USAC Stock Car National Championship

== Touring car ==
Series	Driver	Season article
European Touring Car Championship	(Italy) Umberto Grano	1982 European Touring Car Championship
Australian Touring Car Championship	(Australia) Dick Johnson	1982 Australian Touring Car Championship
Australian Endurance Championship	(Canada) Allan Moffat	1982 Australian Endurance Championship
British Saloon Car Championship	(United Kingdom) Andy Rouse	1982 British Saloon Car Championship
Coupe d'Europe Renault 5 Alpine	(France) Joël Gouhier	1982 Coupe d'Europe Renault 5 Alpine
Deutsche Rennsport Meisterschaft	(France) Bob Wollek	1982 Deutsche Rennsport Meisterschaft
French Supertouring Championship	(France) René Metge	1982 French Supertouring Championship
AMSCAR Series	(Australia) Allan Grice	
Stock Car Brasil	(Brazil) Olímpio Alencar Junior	1982 Stock Car Brasil season
TC2000 Championship	(Argentina) Jorge Omar del Río	1982 TC2000 Championship

== See also ==
- List of motorsport championships
- Auto racing
