= List of 1979 motorsport champions =

1979 motorsport champions
Previous: 1978	Next: 1980

This list of 1979 motorsport champions is a list of national or international auto racing series with a Championship decided by the points or positions earned by a driver from multiple races.

== Dirt oval racing ==
Series	Champion	Refer
World of Outlaws Sprint Car Series	(United States) Steve Kinser	
World of Outlaws Sprint Car Series	Teams: (United States) Karl Kinser Racing	

== Drag racing ==
Series	Champion	Refer
NHRA Winston Drag Racing Series	Top Fuel: (United States) Rob Bruins	1979 NHRA Winston Drag Racing Series
NHRA Winston Drag Racing Series	Funny Car: (United States) Raymond Beadle	1979 NHRA Winston Drag Racing Series
NHRA Winston Drag Racing Series	Pro Stock: (United States) Bob Glidden	1979 NHRA Winston Drag Racing Series

== Karting ==
Series	Driver	Season article
Karting World Championship	(Netherlands) Peter Koene	
Karting World Championship	Junior: (Switzerland) Thomas Glauser	
Karting European Championship	100cc: (France) Cathy Muller	
Karting European Championship	FC: (Italy) Giancarlo Vanaria	
Karting European Championship	FC-2: (Sweden) Jan Svaneby	

== Motorcycle racing ==
Series	Driver	Season article
500cc World Championship	(United States) Kenny Roberts	1979 Grand Prix motorcycle racing season
350cc World Championship	(South Africa) Kork Ballington	1979 Grand Prix motorcycle racing season
250cc World Championship	(South Africa) Kork Ballington	1979 Grand Prix motorcycle racing season
125cc World Championship	(Spain) Ángel Nieto	1979 Grand Prix motorcycle racing season
50cc World Championship	(Italy) Eugenio Lazzarini	1979 Grand Prix motorcycle racing season
Speedway World Championship	(New Zealand) Ivan Mauger	1979 Individual Speedway World Championship
Formula 750	(France) Patrick Pons	1979 Formula 750 season
AMA Superbike Championship	(United States) Wes Cooley	1979 AMA Superbike Championship

=== Motocross ===
Series	Driver	Season article
FIM Motocross World Championship	500cc: (United Kingdom) Graham Noyce	1979 FIM Motocross World Championship
FIM Motocross World Championship	250cc: (Sweden) Håkan Carlqvist	1979 FIM Motocross World Championship
FIM Motocross World Championship	125cc: (Belgium) Harry Everts	1979 FIM Motocross World Championship

== Open wheel racing ==
Series	Driver	Season article
Formula One World Championship	(South Africa) Jody Scheckter	1979 Formula One season
Formula One World Championship	Constructors: (Italy) Ferrari	1979 Formula One season
British Formula One Championship	(United Kingdom) Rupert Keegan	1979 British Formula One Championship
SCCA/CART IndyCar Series	(United States) Rick Mears	1979 SCCA/CART Indy Car Series
SCCA/CART IndyCar Series	Manufacturers: (United Kingdom) Cosworth DFX	1979 SCCA/CART Indy Car Series
SCCA/CART IndyCar Series	Rookies: (United States) Bill Alsup	1979 SCCA/CART Indy Car Series
USAC National Championship	(United States) A. J. Foyt	1979 USAC Championship Car season
USAC Mini-Indy Series	(Australia) Dennis Firestone	1979 USAC Mini-Indy Series season
SCCA Formula Super Vee	(Australia) Geoff Brabham	1979 SCCA Formula Super Vee season
Cup of Peace and Friendship	(Czechoslovakia) Václav Lim	1979 Cup of Peace and Friendship
Cup of Peace and Friendship	Nations: Czechoslovakia	1979 Cup of Peace and Friendship
Formula Atlantic	(United States) Tom Gloy	1979 Formula Atlantic season
South African Formula Atlantic Championship	(South Africa) Ian Scheckter	1978-79 South African Formula Atlantic Championship
South African National Drivers Championship	(South Africa) Ian Scheckter	1979 South African National Drivers Championship
Australian Drivers' Championship	(Australia) Johnnie Walker	1979 Australian Drivers' Championship
Rothmans International Series	(Australia) Larry Perkins	1979 Rothmans International Series
Formula Nacional	(Spain) Manuel Valls i Biesca	1979 Formula Nacional
Formula Two
Australian Formula 2 Championship	(Australia) Brian Shead	1979 Australian Formula 2 Championship
European Formula Two Championship	(Switzerland) Marc Surer	1979 European Formula Two Championship
All-Japan Formula Two Championship	(Japan) Keiji Matsumoto	1979 All-Japan Formula Two Championship
Formula Three
FIA European Formula 3 Championship	(France) Alain Prost	1979 FIA European Formula 3 Championship
All-Japan Formula Three Championship	(Japan) Toshio Suzuki	1979 All-Japan Formula Three Championship
All-Japan Formula Three Championship	Teams: (Japan) Heros Racing	1979 All-Japan Formula Three Championship
British Formula Three Championship	(Brazil) Chico Serra	1979 British Formula Three Championship
Chilean Formula Three Championship	(Chile) Santiago Bengolea	1979 Chilean Formula Three Championship
French Formula Three Championship	(France) Alain Prost	1979 French Formula Three Championship
French Formula Three Championship	Teams: (France) Oreca	1979 French Formula Three Championship
German Formula Three Championship	(West Germany) Michael Korten	1979 German Formula Three Championship
Italian Formula Three Championship	(Italy) Piercarlo Ghinzani	1979 Italian Formula Three Championship
Italian Formula Three Championship	Teams: (Italy) Euroracing	1979 Italian Formula Three Championship
Soviet Formula 3 Championship	(Soviet Union) Viktor Klimanov	1979 Soviet Formula 3 Championship
Swiss Formula Three Championship	(Switzerland) Beat Blatter	1979 Swiss Formula Three Championship
Swiss Formula Three Championship	Teams: (Switzerland) Sauber Racing	1979 Swiss Formula Three Championship
Formula Renault
French Formula Renault Championship	(France) Alain Ferté	1979 French Formula Renault Championship
Formula Ford
Australian Formula Ford Championship	(Australia) Russell Norden	1979 Australian Formula Ford Championship
Brazilian Formula Ford Championship	(Brazil) Arthur Bragantini	
British Formula Ford Championship	(United Kingdom) David Sears	
Danish Formula Ford Championship	(Denmark) Jesper Villumsen	
Dutch Formula Ford 1600 Championship	(Netherlands) Boy Hayje	
EFDA Formula Ford 2000 Championship	(United Kingdom) Adrian Reynard	
European Formula Ford Championship	(United Kingdom) John Village	1979 European Formula Ford Championship
Irish Formula Ford Championship	(Republic of Ireland) Colin Lees	
New Zealand Formula Ford Championship	(New Zealand) Mike Finch	
Swedish Formula Ford Championship	(Sweden) Slim Borgudd	

== Rallying ==
Series	Driver	Season article
World Rally Championship	(Sweden) Björn Waldegård	1979 World Rally Championship season
World Rally Championship	Co-Drivers: (Sweden) Hans Thorszelius	1979 World Rally Championship season
World Rally Championship	Manufacturer: (United States) Ford	1979 World Rally Championship season
Australian Rally Championship	(Australia) Ross Dunkerton	1979 Australian Rally Championship
Australian Rally Championship	Co-Drivers: (Australia) Jeff Beaumont	1979 Australian Rally Championship
British Rally Championship	(Finland) Pentti Airikkala; Co-driver: (Finland) Risto Virtanen	1979 British Rally Championship
Canadian Rally Championship	(Finland) Taisto Heinonen; Co-driver: (Canada) Tom Burgess	1979 Canadian Rally Championship
Deutsche Rallye Meisterschaft	(Germany) Reinhard Hainbach	1979 Deutsche Rallye Meisterschaft
Estonian Rally Championship	(Estonian Soviet Socialist Republic) Jüri Triisa	1979 Estonian Rally Championship
Estonian Rally Championship	Co-Drivers: (Estonian Soviet Socialist Republic) Valdur Lembing	1979 Estonian Rally Championship
European Rally Championship	(Germany) Jochi Kleint	1979 European Rally Championship
Finnish Rally Championship	Group 1: (Finland) Veli Hirvonen	1979 Finnish Rally Championship
Finnish Rally Championship	Group 2: (Finland) Kyösti Hämäläinen	1979 Finnish Rally Championship
French Rally Championship	(France) Bernard Béguin	
Hungarian Rally Championship	(Hungary) Attila Ferjáncz	
Hungarian Rally Championship	Co-Drivers: (Hungary) János Tandari	
Irish Tarmac Rally Championship	(United Kingdom) Brian Nelson; Co-driver: (United Kingdom) Rodney Cole	1979 Irish Tarmac Rally Championship
Italian Rally Championship	(Italy) Antonio Fassina; Co-driver: (Italy) Mauro Mannini	1979 Italian Rally Championship
New Zealand Rally Championship	(New Zealand) Paul Adams	1979 New Zealand Rally Championship
Polish Rally Championship	(Poland) Błażej Krupa	
Romanian Rally Championship	(Romania) Ilie Olteanu	
SCCA ProRally	(United States) John Buffum; Co-driver: (United States) Mark Howard	1979 SCCA ProRally
Scottish Rally Championship	(United Kingdom) Drew Gallacher	
Scottish Rally Championship	Co-Drivers: (United Kingdom) David McHarg	
South African National Rally Championship	(South Africa) Sarel van der Merwe; Co-driver: (South Africa) Franz Boshoff	1979 South African National Rally Championship
Spanish Rally Championship	(Spain) Jorge de Bagration; Co-driver: (Spain) Ignacio Lewin	1979 Spanish Rally Championship
Victorian Rally Championship	(Australia) Warwick Smith; Co-driver: (Australia) Paul Paterson	1979 Victorian Rally Championship

=== Rallycross ===
Series	Driver	Season article
FIA European Rallycross Championship	TC: (Norway) Martin Schanche	
FIA European Rallycross Championship	GT: (Sweden) Olle Arnesson	
Australian Rallycross Championship	(Australia) Larry Perkins	1979 Australian Rallycross Championship
British Rallycross Championship	(United Kingdom) Bruce Rushton	

== Sports car and GT ==
Series	Driver	Season article
World Sportscar Championship	(West Germany) Porsche	1979 World Sportscar Championship season
IMSA GT Championship	(United States) Peter Gregg	1979 IMSA GT Championship season
Australian Sports Sedan Championship	(Australia) Allan Grice	1979 Australian Sports Sedan Championship
Australian Sports Car Championship	(Australia) Ross Mathiesen	1979 Australian Sports Car Championship
Can-Am Series	(Belgium) Jacky Ickx	1979 Can-Am season
Fuji Grand Champion Series	(Japan) Satoru Nakajima	1979 Fuji Grand Championship Series
Trans-Am Series	TA1: (United States) Gene Bothello	1979 Trans-Am Series
Trans-Am Series	TA1 Manufacturers: (United States) Chevrolet	1979 Trans-Am Series
Trans-Am Series	TA2: (United States) John Paul Sr.	1979 Trans-Am Series
Trans-Am Series	TA2 Manufacturers: (Germany) Porsche	1979 Trans-Am Series

== Stock car racing ==
Series	Driver	Season article
NASCAR Winston Cup Series	(United States) Richard Petty	1979 NASCAR Winston Cup Series
NASCAR Winston Cup Series	Manufacturers: (United States) Chevrolet	1979 NASCAR Winston Cup Series
NASCAR Winston West Series	(United States) Bill Schmitt	1979 NASCAR Winston West Series
ARCA Racing Series	(United States) Marvin Smith	1979 ARCA Racing Series
USAC Stock Car National Championship	(United States) A. J. Foyt	1979 USAC Stock Car National Championship

== Touring car ==
Series	Driver	Season article
European Touring Car Championship	(Italy) Martino Finotto (Italy) Carlo Facetti	1979 European Touring Car Championship
Australian Touring Car Championship	(Australia) Bob Morris	1979 Australian Touring Car Championship
British Touring Car Championship	(United Kingdom) Richard Longman	1979 British Saloon Car Championship
British Touring Car Championship	Manufacturers: (United Kingdom) British Leyland Mini	1979 British Saloon Car Championship
Deutsche Rennsport Meisterschaft	(Germany) Klaus Ludwig	1979 Deutsche Rennsport Meisterschaft
French Supertouring Championship	(France) Dany Snobeck	1979 French Supertouring Championship
Stock Car Brasil	(Brazil) Paulo Gomes	1979 Stock Car Brasil season
TC2000 Championship	(Argentina) Osvaldo López	1979 TC2000 Championship

== See also ==
- List of motorsport championships
- Auto racing
