= List of 1981 motorsport champions =

1981 motorsport champions
Previous: 1980	Next: 1982

This list of 1981 motorsport champions is a list of national or international auto racing series with a Championship decided by the points or positions earned by a driver from multiple races.

== Dirt oval racing ==
Series	Champion	Season article
World of Outlaws Sprint Car Series	(United States) Sammy Swindell	1981 World of Outlaws Sprint Car Series
World of Outlaws Sprint Car Series	Teams: (United States) Nance Speed Equipment	1981 World of Outlaws Sprint Car Series

== Drag racing ==
Series	Champion	Season article
NHRA Winston Drag Racing Series	Top Fuel: (United States) Jeb Allen	1981 NHRA Winston Drag Racing Series
NHRA Winston Drag Racing Series	Funny Car: (United States) Raymond Beadle	1981 NHRA Winston Drag Racing Series
NHRA Winston Drag Racing Series	Pro Stock: (United States) Lee Shepherd	1981 NHRA Winston Drag Racing Series

== Karting ==
Series	Driver	Season article
Karting World Championship	(United Kingdom) Mike Wilson	1981 Karting World Championship
CIK-FIA Junior World Cup	(Netherlands) Michel Vacirca	1981 CIK-FIA Junior World Cup
Karting European Championship	ICA: (Netherlands) Peter De Bruijn	1981 Karting European Championship
Karting European Championship	FC: (Italy) Gianfranco Baroni	1981 Karting European Championship
Karting European Championship	FC-2: (Italy) Gianfranco Baroni	1981 Karting European Championship

== Motorcycle racing ==
Series	Driver	Season article
500cc World Championship	(Italy) Marco Lucchinelli	1981 Grand Prix motorcycle racing season
350cc World Championship	(West Germany) Anton Mang	1981 Grand Prix motorcycle racing season
250cc World Championship	(West Germany) Anton Mang	1981 Grand Prix motorcycle racing season
125cc World Championship	(Spain) Ángel Nieto	1981 Grand Prix motorcycle racing season
50cc World Championship	(Spain) Ricardo Tormo	1981 Grand Prix motorcycle racing season
Speedway World Championship	(United States) Bruce Penhall	1981 Individual Speedway World Championship
AMA Superbike Championship	(United States) Eddie Lawson	1981 AMA Superbike Championship
Australian Superbike Series	(Australia) Rob Phillis	1981 Australian Superbike Series

== Open wheel racing ==
Series	Driver	Season article
FIA Formula One World Championship	(Brazil) Nelson Piquet	1981 Formula One World Championship
FIA Formula One World Championship	Constructors: (United Kingdom) Williams-Ford	1981 Formula One World Championship
CART PPG Indy Car World Series	(United States) Rick Mears	1981 CART PPG Indy Car World Series
CART PPG Indy Car World Series	Manufacturers: (United Kingdom) Cosworth	1981 CART PPG Indy Car World Series
CART PPG Indy Car World Series	Rookies: (United States) Bob Lazier	1981 CART PPG Indy Car World Series
Australian Drivers' Championship	(Australia) Alfredo Costanzo	1981 Australian Drivers' Championship
Cup of Peace and Friendship	(Czechoslovakia) Jiří Moskal	1981 Cup of Peace and Friendship
Cup of Peace and Friendship	Nations: East Germany	1981 Cup of Peace and Friendship
Formula Atlantic	(Canada) Jacques Villeneuve	1981 Formula Atlantic season
Formula Nacional	(Spain) Jose Luis Llobell	1981 Formula Nacional
SCCA Formula Super Vee	(United States) Al Unser Jr.	1981 SCCA Formula Super Vee season
South African National Drivers Championship	(South Africa) Bernard Tilanus	1981 South African National Drivers Championship
Formula Two
Australian Formula 2 Championship	(Australia) John Smith	1981 Australian Formula 2 Championship
European Formula Two Championship	(United Kingdom) Geoff Lees	1981 European Formula Two Championship
All-Japan Formula Two Championship	(Japan) Satoru Nakajima	1981 All-Japan Formula Two Championship
Formula Three
FIA European Formula 3 Championship	(Italy) Mauro Baldi	1981 FIA European Formula 3 Championship
FIA European Formula 3 Championship	Teams: (Italy) Euroracing	1981 FIA European Formula 3 Championship
All-Japan Formula Three Championship	(Japan) Osamu Nakako	1981 All-Japan Formula Three Championship
All-Japan Formula Three Championship	Teams: (Japan) Hayashi Racing	1981 All-Japan Formula Three Championship
British Formula Three Championship	(United Kingdom) Jonathan Palmer	1981 British Formula Three Championship
Chilean Formula Three Championship	(Chile) Sergio Santander	1981 Chilean Formula Three Championship
French Formula Three Championship	(France) Philippe Streiff	1981 French Formula Three Championship
German Formula Three Championship	(West Germany) Frank Jelinski	1981 German Formula Three Championship
Italian Formula Three Championship	(Italy) Eddy Bianchi	1981 Italian Formula Three Championship
Italian Formula Three Championship	Teams: (Italy) Team del Porto	1981 Italian Formula Three Championship
Soviet Formula 3 Championship	(Soviet Union) Viktor Klimanov	1981 Soviet Formula 3 Championship
Swiss Formula Three Championship	(Switzerland) Marcel Wettstein	1981 Swiss Formula Three Championship
Formula Renault
French Formula Renault Championship	(France) Philippe Renault	1981 French Formula Renault Championship
Formula Renault Argentina	(Argentina) Carlos Lauricella	1981 Formula Renault Argentina
Formula Ford
Australian Formula Ford Championship	(Australia) Phillip Revell	1981 TAA Formula Ford Driver to Europe Series
Brazilian Formula Ford Championship	(Brazil) Egon Herzfeldt	1981 Brazilian Formula Ford Championship
British Formula Ford Championship	(Brazil) Ayrton Senna	1981 British Formula Ford Championship
British Formula Ford 2000 Championship	(Republic of Ireland) Tommy Byrne	1981 British Formula Ford 2000 Championship
Danish Formula Ford Championship	(Denmark) Kim Dupont	1981 Danish Formula Ford Championship
European Formula Ford Championship	(Netherlands) Cor Euser	1981 European Formula Ford Championship
Formula Ford 1600 Netherlands	(Netherlands) Cor Euser	1981 Formula Ford 1600 Netherland
EFDA Formula Ford 2000 Championship	(Republic of Ireland) Tommy Byrne	1981 EFDA Formula Ford 2000 Championship
Irish Formula Ford Championship	(Republic of Ireland) Arnie Black	1981 Irish Formula Ford Championship
New Zealand Formula Ford Championship	(New Zealand) Jeff Pascoe	1981 New Zealand Formula Ford Championship
Scottish Formula Ford Championship	(United Kingdom) Vic Covey	1981 Scottish Formula Ford Championship
Swedish Formula Ford Championship	(Sweden) Bengt Trägårdh	1981 Swedish Formula Ford Championship

== Rallying ==
Series	Driver	Season article
World Rally Championship	(Finland) Ari Vatanen	1981 World Rally Championship
World Rally Championship	Co-Drivers: (United Kingdom) David Richards	1981 World Rally Championship
World Rally Championship	Manufacturers: (United Kingdom) Talbot	1981 World Rally Championship
African Rally Championship	(Kenya) Shekhar Mehta	1981 African Rally Championship
Australian Rally Championship	(Australia) Geoff Portman	1981 Australian Rally Championship
Australian Rally Championship	Co-Drivers: (Australia) Ross Runnalls	1981 Australian Rally Championship
British Rally Championship	(United Kingdom) Jimmy McRae	1981 British Rally Championship
British Rally Championship	Co-Drivers: (United Kingdom) Ian Grindrod	1981 British Rally Championship
Canadian Rally Championship	(Canada) Randy Black	1981 Canadian Rally Championship
Canadian Rally Championship	Co-Drivers: (Canada) Bob Lee	1981 Canadian Rally Championship
Deutsche Rallye Meisterschaft	(Germany) Alfons Stock	1981 Deutsche Rallye Meisterschaft
Estonian Rally Championship	(Estonian Soviet Socialist Republic) Ivar Peedu	1981 Estonian Rally Championship
Estonian Rally Championship	Co-Drivers: (Estonian Soviet Socialist Republic) Juhan Kasemaa	1981 Estonian Rally Championship
European Rally Championship	(Italy) Adartico Vudafieri	1981 European Rally Championship
European Rally Championship	Co-Drivers: (Italy) Arnaldo Bernacchini	1981 European Rally Championship
Finnish Rally Championship	Group 1: (Finland) Antero Laine	1981 Finnish Rally Championship
Finnish Rally Championship	Group 2: (Finland) Kyösti Hämäläinen	1981 Finnish Rally Championship
French Rally Championship	(France) Bruno Saby	1981 French Rally Championship
Hungarian Rally Championship	(Hungary) Attila Ferjáncz	1981 Hungarian Rally Championship
Hungarian Rally Championship	Co-Drivers: (Hungary) János Tandari	1981 Hungarian Rally Championship
Italian Rally Championship	(Italy) Antonio Fassina	1981 Italian Rally Championship
Italian Rally Championship	Co-Drivers: (Italy) Rudy Dal Pozzo	1981 Italian Rally Championship
Italian Rally Championship	Manufacturers: (Germany) Opel	1981 Italian Rally Championship
New Zealand Rally Championship	(New Zealand) Jim Donald	1981 New Zealand Rally Championship
Polish Rally Championship	(Poland) Tomasz Ciecierzyński	1981 Polish Rally Championship
Romanian Rally Championship	(Romania) Ludovic Balint	1981 Romanian Rally Championship
Scottish Rally Championship	(United Kingdom) Donald Heggie	1981 Scottish Rally Championship
Scottish Rally Championship	Co-Drivers: (United Kingdom) Ian Mungall	1981 Scottish Rally Championship
South African National Rally Championship	(South Africa) Sarel van der Merwe	1981 South African National Rally Championship
South African National Rally Championship	Co-Drivers: (South Africa) Franz Boshoff	1981 South African National Rally Championship
South African National Rally Championship	Manufacturers: (Japan) Toyota	1981 South African National Rally Championship
Spanish Rally Championship	(Spain) Jorge de Bagration	1981 Spanish Rally Championship
Spanish Rally Championship	Co-Drivers: (Spain) Ignacio Lewin	1981 Spanish Rally Championship

=== Rallycross ===
Series	Driver	Season article
FIA European Rallycross Championship	TC: (Norway) Martin Schanche	1981 FIA European Rallycross Championship
FIA European Rallycross Championship	GT: (Finland) Matti Alamäki	1981 FIA European Rallycross Championship
British Rallycross Championship	(United Kingdom) Keith Ripp	1981 British Rallycross Championship

== Sports car and GT ==
Series	Driver	Season article
World Sportscar Championship	(United States) Bob Garretson	1981 World Sportscar Championship
World Sportscar Championship	Over 2000cc Makes: (West Germany) Porsche	1981 World Sportscar Championship
World Sportscar Championship	Under 2000cc Makes: (Italy) Lancia	1981 World Sportscar Championship
IMSA GT Championship	GTX: (United Kingdom) Brian Redman	1981 IMSA GT Championship
IMSA GT Championship	GTO: (United States) David Cowart	1981 IMSA GT Championship
IMSA GT Championship	GTU: (United States) Lee Mueller	1981 IMSA GT Championship
Australian Sports Sedan Championship	(Australia) Tony Edmonson	1981 Australian Sports Sedan Championship
Australian Sports Car Championship	(Australia) John Latham	1981 Australian Sports Car Championship
Can-Am	(Australia) Geoff Brabham	1981 Can-Am season
Can-Am	Under 2-Litre: (United States) Jim Trueman	1981 Can-Am season

== Stock car racing ==
Series	Driver	Season article
NASCAR Winston Cup Series	(United States) Darrell Waltrip	1981 NASCAR Winston Cup Series
NASCAR Winston Cup Series	Manufacturers: (United States) Buick	1981 NASCAR Winston Cup Series
NASCAR Winston West Series	(Canada) Roy Smith	1981 NASCAR Winston West Series
ARCA Racing Series	(United States) Larry Moyer	1981 ARCA Racing Series
Turismo Carretera (1980–1981)	(Argentina) Antonio Aventín	1980–1981 Turismo Carretera
Turismo Carretera (1981)	(Argentina) Roberto Mouras	1981 Turismo Carretera
USAC Stock Car National Championship	(United States) Dean Roper	1981 USAC Stock Car National Championship

== Touring car ==
Series	Driver	Season article
European Touring Car Championship	(Italy) Umberto Grano (West Germany) Helmut Kelleners	1981 European Touring Car Championship
Australian Endurance Championship	(Japan) Toyota	1981 Australian Endurance Championship
Australian Touring Car Championship	(Australia) Dick Johnson	1981 Australian Touring Car Championship
British Saloon Car Championship	(United Kingdom) Win Percy	1981 British Saloon Car Championship
Coupe d'Europe Renault 5 Alpine	(Germany) Wolfgang Schütz	1981 Coupe d'Europe Renault 5 Alpine
Deutsche Rennsport Meisterschaft	(Germany) Klaus Ludwig	1981 Deutsche Rennsport Meisterschaft
French Supertouring Championship	(France) Jean-Pierre Malcher	1981 French Supertouring Championship
Stock Car Brasil	(Brazil) Affonso Giaffone Jr.	1981 Stock Car Brasil season
TC2000 Championship	(Argentina) Jorge Omar del Río	1981 TC2000 Championship

== See also ==
- List of motorsport championships
- Auto racing
