= List of 1983 motorsport champions =

1983 motorsport champions
Previous: 1982	Next: 1984

This list of 1983 motorsport champions is a list of national or international auto racing series with a Championship decided by the points or positions earned by a driver from multiple races.

== Dirt oval racing ==
Series	Champion	Refer
World of Outlaws Sprint Car Series	(United States) Steve Kinser	
World of Outlaws Sprint Car Series	Teams: (United States) Karl Kinser Racing	

== Drag racing ==
Series	Champion	Refer
NHRA Winston Drag Racing Series	Top Fuel: (United States) Gary Beck	1983 NHRA Winston Drag Racing Series
NHRA Winston Drag Racing Series	Funny Car: (United States) Frank Hawley	1983 NHRA Winston Drag Racing Series
NHRA Winston Drag Racing Series	Pro Stock: (United States) Lee Shepherd	1983 NHRA Winston Drag Racing Series

== Karting ==
Series	Driver	Season article
CIK-FIA Karting World Championship	FK: (United Kingdom) Mike Wilson	
CIK-FIA Karting World Championship	FC: (Italy) Gianni Mazzola	
CIK-FIA Junior World Cup	(Netherlands) Frank van Eglem	
CIK-FIA Karting European Championship	FK: (United Kingdom) Mike Wilson	
CIK-FIA Karting European Championship	ICC: (Italy) Pier Mario Cantoni	
CIK-FIA Karting European Championship	ICA: (Italy) Stefano Modena	
World Superkart Championship	(United Kingdom) Martin Hines	

== Motorcycle racing ==
Series	Driver	Season article
500cc World Championship	(United States) Freddie Spencer	1983 Grand Prix motorcycle racing season
250cc World Championship	(Venezuela) Carlos Lavado	1983 Grand Prix motorcycle racing season
125cc World Championship	(Spain) Ángel Nieto	1983 Grand Prix motorcycle racing season
80cc World Championship	(Switzerland) Stefan Dörflinger	1983 Grand Prix motorcycle racing season
Speedway World Championship	(West Germany) Egon Müller	1983 Individual Speedway World Championship
AMA Superbike Championship	(United States) Wayne Rainey	
Australian Superbike Series	(Australia) Rob Phillis	

== Open wheel racing ==
Series	Driver	Season article
FIA Formula One World Championship	(Brazil) Nelson Piquet	1983 Formula One World Championship
FIA Formula One World Championship	Constructors: (Italy) Ferrari	1983 Formula One World Championship
CART PPG Indy Car World Series	(United States) Al Unser	1983 CART PPG Indy Car World Series
CART PPG Indy Car World Series	Manufacturers: (United Kingdom) Cosworth	1983 CART PPG Indy Car World Series
CART PPG Indy Car World Series	Rookies: (Italy) Teo Fabi	1983 CART PPG Indy Car World Series
USAC Championship Car	(United States) Tom Sneva	1982–83 USAC Championship Car season
Australian Drivers' Championship	(Australia) Alfredo Costanzo	1983 Australian Drivers' Championship
Cup of Peace and Friendship	(East Germany) Ulli Melkus	1983 Cup of Peace and Friendship
Cup of Peace and Friendship	Nations: East Germany	1983 Cup of Peace and Friendship
Formula Atlantic	(United States) Michael Andretti	1983 Formula Atlantic season
Formula Nacional	(France) Alain Poli	1983 Formula Nacional
SCCA Formula Super Vee	(United States) Ed Pimm	1983 SCCA Formula Super Vee season
South African National Drivers Championship	(South Africa) Ian Scheckter	1983 South African National Drivers Championship
Formula Two
European Formula Two Championship	(United Kingdom) Jonathan Palmer	1983 European Formula Two Championship
All-Japan Formula Two Championship	(United Kingdom) Geoff Lees	1984 All-Japan Formula Two Championship
Australian Formula 2 Championship	(Australia) Ian Richards	1983 Australian Formula 2 Championship
South American Formula Two Championship	(Argentina) Guillermo Maldonado	1983 South American Formula Two Championship
Formula Three
FIA European Formula 3 Championship	(Italy) Pierluigi Martini	1983 FIA European Formula 3 Championship
All-Japan Formula Three Championship	(Japan) Yoshimasa Fujiwara	1983 All-Japan Formula Three Championship
All-Japan Formula Three Championship	Teams: (Japan) Umeda Racing	1983 All-Japan Formula Three Championship
British Formula Three Championship	(Brazil) Ayrton Senna	1983 British Formula Three Championship
Chilean Formula Three Championship	(Chile) Kurt Horta	1983 Chilean Formula Three Championship
French Formula Three Championship	(France) Michel Ferté	1983 French Formula Three Championship
French Formula Three Championship	Teams: (France) Oreca	1983 French Formula Three Championship
German Formula Three Championship	(Austria) Franz Konrad	1983 German Formula Three Championship
Italian Formula Three Championship	(Italy) Ivan Capelli	1983 Italian Formula Three Championship
Italian Formula Three Championship	Teams: (Italy) Coloni Racing	1983 Italian Formula Three Championship
Soviet Formula 3 Championship	(Estonian Soviet Socialist Republic) Toomas Napa	1983 Soviet Formula 3 Championship
Swiss Formula Three Championship	(Switzerland) Hans-Peter Kaufmann	1983 Swiss Formula Three Championship
Formula Renault
French Formula Renault Championship	(France) Jean-Pierre Hoursourigaray	1983 French Formula Renault Championship
Formula Renault Argentina	(Argentina) Néstor Gurini	1983 Formula Renault Argentina
Formula Ford
Australian Formula Ford Championship	(Australia) Bruce Connolly	1983 Formula Ford Driver to Europe Series
Brazilian Formula Ford Championship	(Brazil) João Alfredo Ferreira	
British Formula Ford Championship	(United Kingdom) Andrew Gilbert-Scott	1983 British Formula Ford Championship
British Formula Ford 2000 Championship	(United Kingdom) Tim Davies	
Danish Formula Ford Championship	(Denmark) Klaus Pedersen	
Dutch Formula Ford 1600 Championship	(Netherlands) Gerrit van Kouwen	1983 Dutch Formula Ford 1600 Championship
EFDA Formula Ford 2000 Championship	(United Kingdom) Russell Spence	
European Formula Ford Championship	(Netherlands) Gerrit van Kouwen	1983 European Formula Ford Championship
German Formula Ford Championship	(Germany) Harald Becker	
New Zealand Formula Ford Championship	(New Zealand) Kevin Ingram	
Scottish Formula Ford Championship	(United Kingdom) Tom Brown	
Swedish Formula Ford Championship	(Sweden) Leo Andersson	

== Rallying ==
Series	Driver	Season article
World Rally Championship	(Finland) Hannu Mikkola	1983 World Rally Championship
World Rally Championship	Co-Drivers: (Sweden) Arne Hertz	1983 World Rally Championship
World Rally Championship	Manufacturers: (Italy) Lancia	1983 World Rally Championship
African Rally Championship	(Ivory Coast) Alain Ambrosino	1983 African Rally Championship
Australian Rally Championship	(Australia) Ross Dunkerton	1983 Australian Rally Championship
Australian Rally Championship	Co-Drivers: (Australia) Geoff Jones	1983 Australian Rally Championship
British Rally Championship	(Sweden) Stig Blomqvist	1983 British Rally Championship
British Rally Championship	Co-Drivers: (Sweden) Björn Cederberg	1983 British Rally Championship
Canadian Rally Championship	(Canada) Randy Black	1983 Canadian Rally Championship
Canadian Rally Championship	Co-Drivers: (Canada) Tom Burgess	1983 Canadian Rally Championship
Deutsche Rallye Meisterschaft	(Germany) Erwin Weber	
Estonian Rally Championship	(Estonian Soviet Socialist Republic) Enn Jõemägi	1983 Estonian Rally Championship
Estonian Rally Championship	Co-Drivers: (Estonian Soviet Socialist Republic) Tiit Sepp	1983 Estonian Rally Championship
European Rally Championship	(Italy) Miki Biasion	1983 European Rally Championship
European Rally Championship	Co-Drivers: (Italy) Tiziano Siviero	1983 European Rally Championship
Finnish Rally Championship	Group 1: (Finland) Mikael Sundström	1983 Finnish Rally Championship
Finnish Rally Championship	Group 2: (Finland) Kyösti Hämäläinen	1983 Finnish Rally Championship
Finnish Rally Championship	Group 4: (Finland) Lasse Lampi	1983 Finnish Rally Championship
French Rally Championship	(France) Guy Fréquelin	
Hungarian Rally Championship	(Hungary) János Hideg	
Hungarian Rally Championship	Co-Drivers: (Hungary) Zoltán Kecskeméti	
Italian Rally Championship	(Italy) Miki Biasion	
Italian Rally Championship	Co-Drivers: (Italy) Tiziano Siviero	
Italian Rally Championship	Manufacturers: (Italy) Lancia	
New Zealand Rally Championship	(New Zealand) Malcolm Stewart	1983 New Zealand Rally Championship
Polish Rally Championship	(Poland) Marian Bublewicz	
Romanian Rally Championship	(Romania) Gheorghe Urdea	
Scottish Rally Championship	(United Kingdom) Jimmy Fleming	
Scottish Rally Championship	Co-Drivers: (United Kingdom) Robin Cunningham	
South African National Rally Championship	(South Africa) Sarel van der Merwe	
South African National Rally Championship	Co-Drivers: (South Africa) Franz Boshoff	
South African National Rally Championship	Manufacturers: (Japan) Toyota	
Spanish Rally Championship	(Spain) Genito Ortíz	
Spanish Rally Championship	Co-Drivers: (Spain) Ramón Mínguez; Co-Drivers: (Spain) Susi Cabal	

=== Rallycross ===
Series	Driver	Season article
FIA European Rallycross Championship	Div 1: (Norway) Egil Stenshagen	
FIA European Rallycross Championship	Div 2: (Sweden) Olle Arnesson	
British Rallycross Championship	(United Kingdom) Keith Ripp	

== Sports car and GT ==
Series	Driver	Season article
World Sportscar Championship	C1: (Belgium) Jacky Ickx	1983 World Sportscar Championship
World Sportscar Championship	Constructors C1: (West Germany) Porsche	1983 World Sportscar Championship
World Sportscar Championship	Constructors C2: (United Kingdom) Giannini-Alba	1983 World Sportscar Championship
World Sportscar Championship	Constructors B: (West Germany) Porsche	1983 World Sportscar Championship
IMSA GT Championship	GTP: (United States) Al Holbert	1983 IMSA GT Championship
IMSA GT Championship	GTO: (United States) Wayne Baker	1983 IMSA GT Championship
IMSA GT Championship	GTU: (United States) Roger Mandeville	1983 IMSA GT Championship
All Japan Endurance Championship	(Australia) Vern Schuppan	1983 All Japan Endurance Championship
All Japan Endurance Championship	Manufacturers: (Germany) Porsche	1983 All Japan Endurance Championship
Australian GT Championship	(Australia) Rusty French	1983 Australian GT Championship
Australian Sports Car Championship	(Australia) Peter Hopwood	1983 Australian Sports Car Championship
Can-Am	(Canada) Jacques Villeneuve	1983 Can-Am season
Can-Am	Under 2 Litre: (Sweden) Bertil Roos	1983 Can-Am season
European Endurance Championship	(France) Bob Wollek	1983 European Endurance Championship

== Stock car racing ==
Series	Driver	Season article
NASCAR Winston Cup Series	(United States) Bobby Allison	1983 NASCAR Winston Cup Series
NASCAR Winston Cup Series	Manufacturers: (United States) Chevrolet	1983 NASCAR Winston Cup Series
NASCAR Budweiser Late Model Sportsman Series	(United States) Sam Ard	1983 NASCAR Budweiser Late Model Sportsman Series
NASCAR Budweiser Late Model Sportsman Series	Manufacturers: (United States) Oldsmobile	1983 NASCAR Budweiser Late Model Sportsman Series
NASCAR Winston West Series	(United States) Jim Robinson	1983 NASCAR Winston West Series
ARCA Racing Series	(United States) Bob Dotter	1983 ARCA Racing Series
Turismo Carretera	(Argentina) Roberto Mouras	1983 Turismo Carretera
USAC Stock Car National Championship	(United States) Dean Roper	1983 USAC Stock Car National Championship

== Touring car ==
Series	Driver	Season article
European Touring Car Championship	(Austria) Dieter Quester	1983 European Touring Car Championship
Australian Touring Car Championship	(Canada) Allan Moffat	1983 Australian Touring Car Championship
Australian Endurance Championship	(Australia) Peter McLeod	1983 Australian Endurance Championship
British Saloon Car Championship	(United Kingdom) Andy Rouse	1983 British Saloon Car Championship
Campeonato Brasileiro de Marcas e Pilotos	(Brazil) Antonio da Matta	1983 Campeonato Brasileiro de Marcas e Pilotos
Coupe d'Europe Renault 5 Alpine	(Netherlands) Jan Lammers	1983 Coupe d'Europe Renault 5 Alpine
Coupe d'Europe Renault 5 Alpine	Teams: (Netherlands) Renault Nederland	1983 Coupe d'Europe Renault 5 Alpine
Deutsche Rennsport Meisterschaft	(France) Bob Wollek	1983 Deutsche Rennsport Meisterschaft
French Supertouring Championship	(France) Alain Cudini	
AMSCAR Series	(Australia) Terry Sheil	
Stock Car Brasil	(Brazil) Paulo Gomes	1983 Stock Car Brasil season
TC2000 Championship	(Argentina) Rubén Luis di Palma	1983 TC2000 Championship

== See also ==
- List of motorsport championships
- Auto racing
