= List of 1978 motorsport champions =

1978 motorsport champions
Previous: 1977	Next: 1979

This list of 1978 motorsport champions is a list of national or international auto racing series with a Championship decided by the points or positions earned by a driver from multiple races.

== Dirt oval racing ==
Series	Champion	Refer
World of Outlaws Sprint Car Series	(United States) Steve Kinser	
World of Outlaws Sprint Car Series	Teams: (United States) Karl Kinser Racing	

== Drag racing ==
Series	Champion	Refer
NHRA Winston Drag Racing Series	Top Fuel: (United States) Kelly Brown	1978 NHRA Winston Drag Racing Series
NHRA Winston Drag Racing Series	Funny Car: (United States) Don Prudhomme	1978 NHRA Winston Drag Racing Series
NHRA Winston Drag Racing Series	Pro Stock: (United States) Bob Glidden	1978 NHRA Winston Drag Racing Series

== Karting ==
Series	Driver	Season article
Karting World Championship	(United States) Lake Speed	
Karting World Championship	Junior: (Italy) Stefano Modena	
Karting European Championship	100cc: (Belgium) Jean-Pierre Knops	
Karting European Championship	FC: (Italy) Gianfranco Baroni	

== Motorcycle racing ==
Series	Driver	Season article
500cc World Championship	(United States) Kenny Roberts	1978 Grand Prix motorcycle racing season
350cc World Championship	(South Africa) Kork Ballington	1978 Grand Prix motorcycle racing season
250cc World Championship	(South Africa) Kork Ballington	1978 Grand Prix motorcycle racing season
125cc World Championship	(Italy) Eugenio Lazzarini	1978 Grand Prix motorcycle racing season
50cc World Championship	(Spain) Ricardo Tormo	1978 Grand Prix motorcycle racing season
Speedway World Championship	(Denmark) Ole Olsen	1978 Individual Speedway World Championship
AMA Superbike Championship	(United Kingdom) Reg Pridmore	
Formula 750	(Venezuela) Johnny Cecotto	1978 Formula 750 season

=== Motocross ===
Series	Driver	Season article
FIM Motocross World Championship	500cc: (Finland) Heikki Mikkola	1978 FIM Motocross World Championship
FIM Motocross World Championship	250cc: (Soviet Union) Gennady Moiseyev	1978 FIM Motocross World Championship
FIM Motocross World Championship	125cc: (Japan) Akira Watanabe	1978 FIM Motocross World Championship

== Open wheel racing ==
Series	Driver	Season article
Formula One World Championship	(United States) Mario Andretti	1978 Formula One season
Formula One World Championship	Constructors: (United Kingdom) Lotus-Ford	1978 Formula One season
USAC National Championship	(United States) Tom Sneva	1978 USAC Championship Car season
European Formula Two Championship	(Italy) Bruno Giacomelli	1978 European Formula Two Championship
All-Japan Formula Two Championship	(Japan) Kazuyoshi Hoshino	1978 All-Japan Formula Two Championship
Australian Drivers' Championship	(New Zealand) Graham McRae	1978 Australian Drivers' Championship
British Formula One Championship	(United Kingdom) Tony Trimmer	1978 British Formula One Championship
Cup of Peace and Friendship	(East Germany) Ulli Melkus	1978 Cup of Peace and Friendship
Cup of Peace and Friendship	Nations: East Germany	1978 Cup of Peace and Friendship
Formula Atlantic	(United States) Howdy Holmes	1978 Formula Atlantic season
Formula Nacional	(Spain) Juan Alonso de Celada	1978 Formula Nacional
Rothmans International Series	(Australia) Warwick Brown	1978 Rothmans International Series
SCCA Formula Super Vee	(United States) Bill Alsup	1978 SCCA Formula Super Vee season
South African Formula Atlantic Championship	(South Africa) Ian Scheckter	1978 South African Formula Atlantic Championship
South African National Drivers Championship	(South Africa) Ian Scheckter	1978 South African National Drivers Championship
USAC Mini-Indy Series	(United States) Bill Alsup	1978 USAC Mini-Indy Series season
Formula Three
FIA European Formula 3 Championship	(Netherlands) Jan Lammers	1978 FIA European Formula 3 Championship
British Formula Three Championship	(Brazil) Nelson Piquet	1978 British Formula Three season
Chilean Formula Three Championship	(Chile) Juan Carlos Ridolfi	1978 Chilean Formula Three Championship
French Formula Three Championship	(France) Alain Prost (tie) (France) Jean-Louis Schlesser (tie)	1978 French Formula Three Championship
French Formula Three Championship	Teams: (France) Oreca	1978 French Formula Three Championship
German Formula Three Championship	(West Germany) Bertram Schäfer	1978 German Formula Three Championship
Italian Formula Three Championship	(Italy) Siegfried Stohr	1978 Italian Formula Three Championship
Italian Formula Three Championship	Teams: (Italy) Trivellato Racing	1978 Italian Formula Three Championship
Soviet Formula 3 Championship	(Soviet Union) Mark Balezin	1978 Soviet Formula 3 Championship
Swiss Formula Three Championship	(Switzerland) Patrick Studer	1978 Swiss Formula Three Championship
Formula Renault
French Formula Renault Championship	(France) Philippe Alliot	1978 French Formula Renault Championship
Formula Ford
Australian Formula Ford Championship	(Australia) John Wright	1978 TAA Formula Ford Driver to Europe Series
Brazilian Formula Ford Championship	(Brazil) Amadeo Ferri	1978 Brazilian Formula Ford Championship
British Formula Ford Championship	(United Kingdom) Kenneth Acheson	1978 British Formula Ford Championship
Danish Formula Ford Championship	(Denmark) Klaus Pedersen	
Dutch Formula Ford 1600 Championship	(Netherlands) Roelof Wunderink	1978 Dutch Formula Ford 1600 Championship
Irish Formula Ford Championship	(Republic of Ireland) Michael Roe	1978 Irish Formula Ford Championship
New Zealand Formula Ford Championship	(New Zealand) Grant Campbell	
Swedish Formula Ford Championship	(Sweden) Anders Olofsson	1978 Swedish Formula Ford Championship

== Rallying ==
Series	Driver	Season article
World Rally Championship	(Finland) Markku Alén	1978 World Rally Championship
World Rally Championship	Co-Drivers: (Finland) Ilkka Kivimäki	1978 World Rally Championship
World Rally Championship	Manufacturers: (Italy) Fiat	1978 World Rally Championship
Australian Rally Championship	(Australia) Greg Carr	1978 Australian Rally Championship
Australian Rally Championship	Co-Drivers: (Australia) John Dawson-Damer	1978 Australian Rally Championship
British Rally Championship	(Finland) Hannu Mikkola	1978 British Rally Championship
British Rally Championship	Co-Drivers: (Sweden) Arne Hertz	1978 British Rally Championship
Canadian Rally Championship	(Finland) Taisto Heinonen	1978 Canadian Rally Championship
Canadian Rally Championship	Co-Drivers: (Canada) Tom Burgess	1978 Canadian Rally Championship
Deutsche Rallye Meisterschaft	(Germany) Reinhard Hainbach	
Estonian Rally Championship	(Estonian Soviet Socialist Republic) Olavi Ellermann	1978 Estonian Rally Championship
Estonian Rally Championship	Co-Drivers: (Estonian Soviet Socialist Republic) Meelis Arumeel	1978 Estonian Rally Championship
European Rally Championship	(Italy) Antonio Carello	1978 European Rally Championship
European Rally Championship	Co-Drivers: (Italy) Maurizio Perissinot	1978 European Rally Championship
Finnish Rally Championship	Group 1: (Finland) Kyösti Hämäläinen	1978 Finnish Rally Championship
Finnish Rally Championship	Group 2: (Finland) Ulf Grönholm	1978 Finnish Rally Championship
Finnish Rally Championship	Group 4: (Finland) Markku Alén	1978 Finnish Rally Championship
French Rally Championship	(France) Bernard Darniche	
Hungarian Rally Championship	(Hungary) Attila Ferjáncz	
Hungarian Rally Championship	Co-Drivers: (Hungary) János Tandari	
Italian Rally Championship	(Italy) Adartico Vudafieri	
Italian Rally Championship	Co-Drivers: (Italy) Mauro Mannini	
Italian Rally Championship	Manufacturers: (Italy) Lancia	
New Zealand Rally Championship	(New Zealand) Blair Robson	1978 New Zealand Rally Championship
Polish Rally Championship	(Poland) Jerzy Landsberg	
Romanian Rally Championship	(Romania) Ilie Olteanu	
Scottish Rally Championship	(United Kingdom) Drew Gallacher	
Scottish Rally Championship	Co-Drivers: (United Kingdom) David McHarg	
South African National Rally Championship	(South Africa) Sarel van der Merwe	
South African National Rally Championship	Co-Drivers: (South Africa) Chris Hawkins	
South African National Rally Championship	Manufacturers: (Japan) Datsun	
Spanish Rally Championship	(Spain) Antonio Zanini	
Spanish Rally Championship	Co-Drivers: (Spain) Víctor Sabater	

=== Rallycross ===
Series	Driver	Season article
FIA European Rallycross Championship	(Norway) Martin Schanche	
British Rallycross Championship	(United Kingdom) Trevor Hopkins	

== Sports car and GT ==
Series	Driver	Season article
World Sportscar Championship	(West Germany) Porsche	1978 World Sportscar Championship
World Sportscar Championship	Division 1: (Germany) BMW	1978 World Sportscar Championship
World Sportscar Championship	Division 2: (Germany) Porsche	1978 World Sportscar Championship
World Sportscar Championship	GT Cup: (Germany) Porsche	1978 World Sportscar Championship
Australian Sports Car Championship	(Australia) Ross Mathiesen	1978 Australian Sports Car Championship
Australian Sports Sedan Championship	(Australia) Allan Grice	1978 Australian Sports Sedan Championship
Can-Am	(Australia) Alan Jones	1978 Can-Am season
IMSA GT Championship	(United States) Peter Gregg	1978 IMSA GT Championship

== Stock car racing ==
Series	Driver	Season article
NASCAR Winston Cup Series	(United States) Cale Yarborough	1978 NASCAR Winston Cup Series
NASCAR Winston Cup Series	Manufacturers: (United States) Chevrolet	1978 NASCAR Winston Cup Series
NASCAR Winston West Series	(United States) Jimmy Insolo	1978 NASCAR Winston West Series
ARCA Racing Series	(United States) Marvin Smith	1978 ARCA Racing Series
Turismo Carretera	(Argentina) Juan María Traverso	1978 Turismo Carretera
USAC Stock Car National Championship	(United States) A. J. Foyt	1978 USAC Stock Car National Championship

== Touring car ==
Series	Driver	Season article
European Touring Car Championship	(Italy) Umberto Grano	1978 European Touring Car Championship
Australian Touring Car Championship	(Australia) Peter Brock	1978 Australian Touring Car Championship
British Saloon Car Championship	(United Kingdom) Richard Longman	1978 British Saloon Car Championship
Coupe d'Europe Renault 5 Alpine	(Germany) Wolfgang Schütz	1978 Coupe d'Europe Renault 5 Alpine
Deutsche Rennsport Meisterschaft	(Austria) Harald Ertl	1978 Deutsche Rennsport Meisterschaft
French Supertouring Championship	(France) Lucien Guitteny	1978 French Supertouring Championship

== See also ==
- List of motorsport championships
- Auto racing
