= List of 1977 motorsport champions =

1977 motorsport champions
Previous: 1976	Next: 1978

This list of 1977 motorsport champions is a list of national or international auto racing series with a Championship decided by the points or positions earned by a driver from multiple races.

== Drag racing ==
Series	Champion	Refer
NHRA Winston Drag Racing Series	Top Fuel: (United States) Shirley Muldowney	1977 NHRA Winston Drag Racing Series
NHRA Winston Drag Racing Series	Funny Car: (United States) Don Prudhomme	1977 NHRA Winston Drag Racing Series
NHRA Winston Drag Racing Series	Pro Stock: (United States) Don Nicholson	1977 NHRA Winston Drag Racing Series

== Karting ==
Series	Driver	Season article
Karting World Championship	(Italy) Felice Rovelli	
Karting World Championship	Junior: (Italy) Paolo Bandinelli	
Karting European Championship	100cc: (United Kingdom) Terry Fullerton	
Karting European Championship	FC: (Italy) Gianfranco Baroni	

== Motorcycle racing ==
Series	Driver	Season article
500cc World Championship	(United Kingdom) Barry Sheene	1977 Grand Prix motorcycle racing season
350cc World Championship	(Japan) Takazumi Katayama	1977 Grand Prix motorcycle racing season
250cc World Championship	(Italy) Mario Lega	1977 Grand Prix motorcycle racing season
125cc World Championship	(Italy) Pier Paolo Bianchi	1977 Grand Prix motorcycle racing season
50cc World Championship	(Spain) Ángel Nieto	1977 Grand Prix motorcycle racing season
Speedway World Championship	(New Zealand) Ivan Mauger	1977 Individual Speedway World Championship
Formula 750	(United States) Steve Baker	1977 Formula 750 season
AMA Superbike Championship	(United Kingdom) Reg Pridmore	

=== Motocross ===
Series	Driver	Season article
FIM Motocross World Championship	500cc: (Finland) Heikki Mikkola	1977 FIM Motocross World Championship
FIM Motocross World Championship	250cc: (Soviet Union) Gennady Moiseyev	1977 FIM Motocross World Championship
FIM Motocross World Championship	125cc: (Belgium) Gaston Rahier	1977 FIM Motocross World Championship

== Open wheel racing ==
Series	Driver	Season article
Formula One World Championship	(Austria) Niki Lauda	1977 Formula One season
Formula One World Championship	Constructors: (Italy) Ferrari	1977 Formula One season
USAC National Championship	(United States) Tom Sneva	1977 USAC Championship Car season
European Formula Two Championship	(France) René Arnoux	1977 European Formula Two Championship
All-Japan Formula 2000 Championship	(Japan) Kazuyoshi Hoshino	1977 All-Japan Formula 2000 Championship
Australian Drivers' Championship	(Australia) John McCormack	1977 Australian Drivers' Championship
Australian Formula 2 Championship	(Australia) Peter Larner	1977 Australian Formula 2 Championship
Cup of Peace and Friendship	(Czechoslovakia) Karel Jílek	1977 Cup of Peace and Friendship
Cup of Peace and Friendship	Nations: Czechoslovakia	1977 Cup of Peace and Friendship
Formula Atlantic	(Canada) Gilles Villeneuve	1977 Formula Atlantic season
Formula Nacional	(Spain) Miquel Molons	1977 Formula Nacional
Rothmans International Series	(Australia) Warwick Brown	1977 Rothmans International Series
SCCA Formula Super Vee	(United States) Bob Lazier	1977 SCCA Formula Super Vee season
Shellsport International Series	(United Kingdom) Tony Trimmer	1977 Shellsport International Series
South African Formula Atlantic Championship	(South Africa) Ian Scheckter	1977 South African Formula Atlantic Championship
South African National Drivers Championship	(South Africa) Ian Scheckter	1977 South African National Drivers Championship
USAC Mini-Indy Series	(United States) Tom Bagley (United States) Herm Johnson	1977 USAC Mini-Indy Series season
Formula Three
FIA European Formula 3 Championship	(Italy) Piercarlo Ghinzani	1977 FIA European Formula 3 Championship
British Formula Three Championship	(Republic of Ireland) Derek Daly	1977 British Formula Three season
Chilean Formula Three Championship	(Chile) Juan Carlos Silva	1977 Chilean Formula Three Championship
German Formula Three Championship	(Austria) Peter Scharmann	1977 German Formula Three Championship
Italian Formula Three Championship	(Italy) Elio de Angelis	1977 Italian Formula Three Championship
Italian Formula Three Championship	Teams: (Italy) Trivellato Racing	1977 Italian Formula Three Championship
Soviet Formula 3 Championship	(Soviet Union) Mikhail Lvov	1977 Soviet Formula 3 Championship
Formula Renault
French Formula Renault Championship	(France) Joël Gouhier	1977 French Formula Renault Championship
Formula Ford
Australian Formula Ford Championship	(Australia) John Smith	1977 TAA Formula Ford Driver to Europe Series
Brazilian Formula Ford Championship	(Brazil) Arthur Bragantini	1977 Brazilian Formula Ford Championship
British Formula Ford Championship	(South Africa) Trevor van Rooyen	1977 British Formula Ford Championship
Danish Formula Ford Championship	(Denmark) Finn Milling	
Dutch Formula Ford 1600 Championship	(Netherlands) Roelof Wunderink	1977 Dutch Formula Ford 1600 Championship
New Zealand Formula Ford Championship	(New Zealand) Eric Morgan	1976–77 New Zealand Formula Ford Championship
Swedish Formula Ford Championship	(Sweden) Anders Olofsson	1977 Swedish Formula Ford Championship

== Rallying ==
Series	Driver	Season article
World Rally Championship	(Italy) Sandro Munari	1977 World Rally Championship
World Rally Championship	Co-Drivers: (Italy) Pierro Sodano	1977 World Rally Championship
World Rally Championship	Manufacturers: (Italy) Fiat	1977 World Rally Championship
Australian Rally Championship	(Australia) Ross Dunkerton	1977 Australian Rally Championship
Australian Rally Championship	Co-Drivers: (Australia) Jeff Beaumont	1977 Australian Rally Championship
British Rally Championship	(United Kingdom) Russell Brookes	1977 British Rally Championship
British Rally Championship	Co-Drivers: (United Kingdom) John Brown	1977 British Rally Championship
Canadian Rally Championship	(Finland) Taisto Heinonen	1977 Canadian Rally Championship
Canadian Rally Championship	Co-Drivers: (Canada) Tom Burgess	1977 Canadian Rally Championship
Deutsche Rallye Meisterschaft	(Germany) Ludwig Kuhn	
Estonian Rally Championship	(Estonian Soviet Socialist Republic) Olavi Ellermann	1977 Estonian Rally Championship
Estonian Rally Championship	Co-Drivers: (Estonian Soviet Socialist Republic) Meelis Arumeel	1977 Estonian Rally Championship
European Rally Championship	(France) Bernard Darniche	1977 European Rally Championship
European Rally Championship	Co-Drivers: (France) Alain Mahé	1977 European Rally Championship
Finnish Rally Championship	Group 1: (Finland) Kyösti Hämäläinen	1977 Finnish Rally Championship
Finnish Rally Championship	Group 2: (Finland) Hannu Valtaharju	1977 Finnish Rally Championship
Finnish Rally Championship	Group 4: (Finland) Ulf Grönholm	1977 Finnish Rally Championship
French Rally Championship	(France) Guy Fréquelin	
Hungarian Rally Championship	(Hungary) Attila Ferjáncz	
Hungarian Rally Championship	Co-Drivers: (Hungary) János Tandari	
Italian Rally Championship	(Italy) Mauro Pregliasco	
Italian Rally Championship	Co-Drivers: (Italy) Vittorio Reisoli	
Italian Rally Championship	Manufacturers: (Italy) Lancia	
New Zealand Rally Championship	(New Zealand) Rod Millen	1977 New Zealand Rally Championship
Polish Rally Championship	(Poland) Włodzimierz Groblewski	
Romanian Rally Championship	(Romania) Ștefan Iancovici	
Scottish Rally Championship	(United Kingdom) Charles Samson	
Scottish Rally Championship	Co-Drivers: (United Kingdom) Alec Samson	
South African National Rally Championship	(South Africa) Sarel van der Merwe	
South African National Rally Championship	Co-Drivers: (South Africa) Richard Leeke	
South African National Rally Championship	Manufacturers: (Japan) Datsun	
Spanish Rally Championship	(Spain) Antonio Zanini	
Spanish Rally Championship	Co-Drivers: (Spain) Víctor Sabater	

=== Rallycross ===
Series	Driver	Season article
FIA European Rallycross Championship	(Austria) Herbert Grünsteidl	
British Rallycross Championship	(United Kingdom) Trevor Hopkins	

== Sports car and GT ==
Series	Driver	Season article
World Sportscar Championship	(Italy) Alfa Romeo	1977 World Sportscar Championship
World Championship for Makes	(Germany) Porsche	1977 World Championship for Makes
World Championship for Makes	Division 1: (Germany) BMW	1977 World Championship for Makes
World Championship for Makes	Division 2: (Germany) Porsche	1977 World Championship for Makes
World Championship for Makes	Division 3: (Germany) Porsche	1977 World Championship for Makes
Australian Sports Car Championship	(Australia) Alan Hamilton	1977 Australian Sports Car Championship
Can-Am	(France) Patrick Tambay	1977 Can-Am season
IMSA GT Championship	(United States) Al Holbert	1977 IMSA GT Championship

== Stock car racing ==
Series	Driver	Season article
NASCAR Winston Cup Series	(United States) Cale Yarborough	1977 NASCAR Winston Cup Series
NASCAR Winston Cup Series	Manufacturers: (United States) Chevrolet	1977 NASCAR Winston Cup Series
NASCAR Winston West Series	(United States) Bill Schmitt	1977 NASCAR Winston West Series
ARCA Racing Series	(United States) Conan Myers	1977 ARCA Racing Series
Turismo Carretera	(Argentina) Juan María Traverso	1977 Turismo Carretera
USAC Stock Car National Championship	(United States) Paul Feldner	1977 USAC Stock Car National Championship

== Touring car ==
Series	Driver	Season article
European Touring Car Championship	(Austria) Dieter Quester	1977 European Touring Car Championship
Australian Touring Car Championship	(Canada) Allan Moffat	1977 Australian Touring Car Championship
British Saloon Car Championship	(United Kingdom) Bernard Unett	1977 British Saloon Car Championship
Coupe d'Europe Renault 5 Alpine	(Italy) Mauro Baldi	1977 Coupe d'Europe Renault 5 Alpine
Deutsche Rennsport Meisterschaft	(Germany) Rolf Stommelen	1977 Deutsche Rennsport Meisterschaft
French Supertouring Championship	(France) Jean-Pierre Beltoise	1977 French Supertouring Championship

== See also ==
- List of motorsport championships
- Auto racing
