= List of 1984 motorsport champions =

1984 motorsport champions
Previous: 1983	Next: 1985

This list of 1984 motorsport champions is a list of national or international auto racing series with a Championship decided by the points or positions earned by a driver from multiple races.

== Dirt oval racing ==
Series	Champion	Refer
World of Outlaws Sprint Car Series	(United States) Steve Kinser	
World of Outlaws Sprint Car Series	Teams: (United States) Karl Kinser Racing	

== Drag racing ==
Series	Champion	Refer
NHRA Winston Drag Racing Series	Top Fuel: (United States) Joe Amato	1984 NHRA Winston Drag Racing Series
NHRA Winston Drag Racing Series	Funny Car: (United States) Mark Oswald	1984 NHRA Winston Drag Racing Series
NHRA Winston Drag Racing Series	Pro Stock: (United States) Lee Shepherd	1984 NHRA Winston Drag Racing Series

== Karting ==
Series	Driver	Season article
CIK-FIA Karting World Championship	FK: (Denmark) Jorn Haase	
CIK-FIA Karting World Championship	FC: (Italy) Gabriele Tarquini	
CIK-FIA Junior World Cup	(Italy) Andrea Gilardi	
CIK-FIA Karting European Championship	FK: (United Kingdom) Mike Wilson	
CIK-FIA Karting European Championship	ICC: (Italy) Riccardo Franchini	
CIK-FIA Karting European Championship	ICA: (Italy) Stefano Modena	
World Superkart Championship	(Sweden) Lennart Bohlin	

== Motorcycle racing ==
Series	Driver	Season article
500cc World Championship	(United States) Eddie Lawson	1984 Grand Prix motorcycle racing season
250cc World Championship	(France) Christian Sarron	1984 Grand Prix motorcycle racing season
125cc World Championship	(Spain) Ángel Nieto	1984 Grand Prix motorcycle racing season
80cc World Championship	(Switzerland) Stefan Dörflinger	1984 Grand Prix motorcycle racing season
Speedway World Championship	(Denmark) Erik Gundersen	1984 Individual Speedway World Championship
AMA Superbike Championship	(United States) Fred Merkel	
Australian Superbike Series	(Australia) Rob Phillis	

== Open wheel racing ==
Series	Driver	Season article
FIA Formula One World Championship	(Austria) Niki Lauda	1984 Formula One World Championship
FIA Formula One World Championship	Constructors: (United Kingdom) McLaren-TAG	1984 Formula One World Championship
CART PPG Indy Car World Series	(United States) Mario Andretti	1984 CART PPG Indy Car World Series
CART PPG Indy Car World Series	Manufacturers: (United Kingdom) Cosworth	1984 CART PPG Indy Car World Series
CART PPG Indy Car World Series	Rookies: (Colombia) Roberto Guerrero	1984 CART PPG Indy Car World Series
Australian Drivers' Championship	(Australia) John Bowe	1984 Australian Drivers' Championship
Cup of Peace and Friendship	(East Germany) Ulli Melkus	1984 Cup of Peace and Friendship
Cup of Peace and Friendship	Nations: East Germany	1984 Cup of Peace and Friendship
SCCA Formula Super Vee	(Netherlands) Arie Luyendyk	1984 SCCA Formula Super Vee season
South African National Drivers Championship	(South Africa) Ian Scheckter	1984 South African National Drivers Championship
Formula Atlantic West Coast	(United States) Dan Marvin	1984 Formula Atlantic West Coast season
Formula Nacional	(Spain) Antonio Cutillas	1984 Formula Nacional
USAC Championship Car	(United States) Rick Mears	1983–84 USAC Championship Car season
Formula Two
European Formula Two Championship	(New Zealand) Mike Thackwell	1984 European Formula Two Championship
All-Japan Formula Two Championship	(Japan) Satoru Nakajima	1984 Japanese Formula Two Championship
Australian Formula 2 Championship	(Australia) Peter Glover	1984 Australian Formula 2 Championship
South American Formula Two Championship	(Argentina) Guillermo Maldonado	1984 South American Formula Two Championship
Formula Three
FIA European Formula 3 Championship	(Italy) Ivan Capelli	1984 FIA European Formula 3 Championship
All-Japan Formula Three Championship	(Japan) Shuji Hyoudo	1984 All-Japan Formula Three Championship
All-Japan Formula Three Championship	Teams: (Japan) Hayashi Racing	1984 All-Japan Formula Three Championship
Austria Formula 3 Cup	(Austria) Ernst Franzmeier	1984 Austria Formula 3 Cup
British Formula Three Championship	(United Kingdom) Johnny Dumfries	1984 British Formula Three Championship
British Formula Three Championship	National: (United Kingdom) Keith Fine	1984 British Formula Three Championship
Chilean Formula Three Championship	(Chile) Kurt Horta	1984 Chilean Formula Three Championship
Finnish Formula Three Championship	(Finland) Jari Koiranen	1984 Finnish Formula Three Championship
Finnish Formula Three Championship	Teams: (Finland) Lahti Racing	1984 Finnish Formula Three Championship
French Formula Three Championship	(France) Olivier Grouillard	1984 French Formula Three Championship
French Formula Three Championship	Teams: (France) Oreca	1984 French Formula Three Championship
German Formula Three Championship	(Denmark) Kurt Thiim	1984 German Formula Three Championship
Italian Formula Three Championship	(Italy) Alessandro Santin	1984 Italian Formula Three Championship
Italian Formula Three Championship	Teams: (Italy) Coloni Racing	1984 Italian Formula Three Championship
Soviet Formula 3 Championship	(Estonian Soviet Socialist Republic) Toomas Napa	1984 Soviet Formula 3 Championship
Swiss Formula Three Championship	(Switzerland) Jo Zeller	1984 Swiss Formula Three Championship
Formula Renault
French Formula Renault Championship	(France) Yannick Dalmas	1984 French Formula Renault Championship
Formula Renault Argentina	(Argentina) Néstor Gurini	1984 Formula Renault Argentina
Formula Ford
Australian Formula Ford Championship	(Australia) Ron Barnacle	1984 Formula Ford Driver to Europe Series
Brazilian Formula Ford Championship	(Brazil) Carlos Silveira	1984 Brazilian Formula Ford Championship
British Formula Ford Championship	(United Kingdom) Dave Coyne	1984 British Formula Ford Championship
British Formula Ford 2000 Championship	(Brazil) Maurizio Sandro Sala	
Danish Formula Ford Championship	(Denmark) Steen Hinge	
Dutch Formula Ford 1600 Championship	(Netherlands) Maartin Bottelier	1984 Dutch Formula Ford 1600 Championship
EFDA Formula Ford 2000 Championship	(Brazil) Maurício Gugelmin	
European Formula Ford Championship	(Switzerland) Hans Furrer	1984 European Formula Ford Championship
Finnish Formula Ford Championship	(Finland) Jari Haavisto	
German Formula Ford Championship	(Germany) Uwe Schäfer	1984 German Formula Ford Championship
New Zealand Formula Ford Championship	(New Zealand) Steven Richards	1983–84 New Zealand Formula Ford Championship
Swedish Formula Ford Championship	(Sweden) Leif Lindström	1984 Swedish Formula Ford Championship

== Rallying ==
Series	Driver	Season article
World Rally Championship	(Sweden) Stig Blomqvist	1984 World Rally Championship
World Rally Championship	Co-Drivers: (Sweden) Björn Cederberg	1984 World Rally Championship
World Rally Championship	Manufacturer: (West Germany) Audi	1984 World Rally Championship
African Rally Championship	(Kenya) David Horsey	1984 African Rally Championship
Australian Rally Championship	(Australia) David Officer	1984 Australian Rally Championship
Australian Rally Championship	Co-Drivers: (Australia) Kate Officer	1984 Australian Rally Championship
British Rally Championship	(United Kingdom) Jimmy McRae	1984 British Rally Championship
British Rally Championship	Co-Drivers: (United Kingdom) Mike Nicholson	1984 British Rally Championship
Canadian Rally Championship	(Canada) Tim Bendle	1984 Canadian Rally Championship
Canadian Rally Championship	Co-Drivers: (Canada) Mary Crundwell	1984 Canadian Rally Championship
Deutsche Rallye Meisterschaft	(Germany) Harald Demuth	
Estonian Rally Championship	(Estonian Soviet Socialist Republic) Enn Jõemägi	1984 Estonian Rally Championship
Estonian Rally Championship	Co-Drivers: (Estonian Soviet Socialist Republic) Tiit Sepp	1984 Estonian Rally Championship
European Rally Championship	(Italy) Carlo Capone	1984 European Rally Championship
European Rally Championship	Co-Drivers: (United States) Sergio Cresto	1984 European Rally Championship
Finnish Rally Championship	Group 1: (Finland) Mika Arpiainen	1984 Finnish Rally Championship
Finnish Rally Championship	Group 2: (Finland) Kyösti Hämäläinen	1984 Finnish Rally Championship
Finnish Rally Championship	Group 4: (Finland) Antero Laine	1984 Finnish Rally Championship
French Rally Championship	(France) Jean Ragnotti	
Hungarian Rally Championship	(Hungary) János Hideg	
Hungarian Rally Championship	Co-Drivers: (Hungary) Attila Bán	
Italian Rally Championship	(Italy) Paolo Fabrizio Fabbri	
Italian Rally Championship	Co-Drivers: (Italy) Paolo Cecchini	
Italian Rally Championship	Manufacturers: (Italy) Fiat	
Italian Rally Championship	Open: (Italy) Adartico Vudafieri	
Italian Rally Championship	Open Co-Drivers: (Italy) Luigi Pirollo	
Italian Rally Championship	Open Manufacturers: (Italy) Lancia	
Middle East Rally Championship	(Qatar) Saeed Al-Hajri	1984 Middle East Rally Championship
New Zealand Rally Championship	(New Zealand) Tony Teesdale	1984 New Zealand Rally Championship
Polish Rally Championship	(Poland) Andrzej Koper	
Romanian Rally Championship	(Romania) Ștefan Vasile	
Scottish Rally Championship	(United Kingdom) Ken Wood	
Scottish Rally Championship	Co-Drivers: (United Kingdom) Peter Brown	
South African National Rally Championship	(South Africa) Sarel van der Merwe	
South African National Rally Championship	Co-Drivers: (South Africa) Franz Boshoff	
South African National Rally Championship	Manufacturers: (Japan) Nissan	
Spanish Rally Championship	(Spain) Antonio Zanini	
Spanish Rally Championship	Co-Drivers: (Spain) Josep Autet	

=== Rallycross ===
Series	Driver	Season article
FIA European Rallycross Championship	Div 1: (Sweden) Anders Norstedt	1984 European Rallycross Championship
FIA European Rallycross Championship	Div 2: (Norway) Martin Schanche	1984 European Rallycross Championship
British Rallycross Championship	(United Kingdom) John Welch	

== Sports car and GT ==
Series	Driver	Season article
World Sportscar Championship	C1: (West Germany) Stefan Bellof	1984 World Sportscar Championship
World Sportscar Championship	Constructors C1: (West Germany) Porsche	1984 World Sportscar Championship
World Sportscar Championship	Constructors C2: (Italy) Alba-Giannini	1984 World Sportscar Championship
World Sportscar Championship	Constructors B: (West Germany) BMW	1984 World Sportscar Championship
IMSA GT Championship	GTP: (United States) Randy Lanier	1984 IMSA GT Championship
IMSA GT Championship	GTO: (United States) Roger Mandeville	1984 IMSA GT Championship
IMSA GT Championship	GTU: (United States) Jack Baldwin	1984 IMSA GT Championship
All Japan Endurance Championship	(Japan) Naoki Nagasaka	1984 All Japan Endurance Championship
All Japan Endurance Championship	Manufacturers: (Germany) Lotec-BMW	1984 All Japan Endurance Championship
Australian GT Championship	(Australia) Allan Grice	1984 Australian GT Championship
Australian Sports Car Championship	(Australia) Bap Romano	1984 Australian Sports Car Championship
Can-Am	(Republic of Ireland) Michael Roe	1984 Can-Am season
Can-Am	Under 2 Litre: (United States) Kim Campbell	1984 Can-Am season

== Stock car racing ==
Series	Driver	Season article
NASCAR Winston Cup Series	(United States) Terry Labonte	1984 NASCAR Winston Cup Series
NASCAR Winston Cup Series	Manufacturers: (United States) Chevrolet	1984 NASCAR Winston Cup Series
NASCAR Busch Grand National Series	(United States) Sam Ard	1984 NASCAR Busch Grand National Series
NASCAR Busch Grand National Series	Manufacturers: (United States) Pontiac	1984 NASCAR Busch Grand National Series
NASCAR Winston West Series	(United States) Jim Robinson	1984 NASCAR Winston West Series
ARCA Racing Series	(United States) Bob Dotter	1984 ARCA Racing Series
Turismo Carretera	(Argentina) Roberto Mouras	1984 Turismo Carretera
USAC Stock Car National Championship	(United States) David Goldsberry	1984 USAC Stock Car National Championship

== Touring car ==
Series	Driver	Season article
European Touring Car Championship	(United Kingdom) Tom Walkinshaw	
Australian Touring Car Championship	(Australia) Dick Johnson	1984 Australian Touring Car Championship
Australian Endurance Championship	(Canada) Allan Moffat	1984 Australian Endurance Championship
Australian Super Series	(Australia) Peter Fitzgerald	1984 Australian Super Series
British Saloon Car Championship	(United Kingdom) Andy Rouse	1984 British Saloon Car Championship
Campeonato Brasileiro de Marcas e Pilotos	(Brazil) Jayme Figueiredo (Brazil) Xandy Negrão	1984 Campeonato Brasileiro de Marcas e Pilotos
Coupe d'Europe Renault 5 Alpine	(Netherlands) Jan Lammers	1984 Coupe d'Europe Renault 5 Alpine
Coupe d'Europe Renault 5 Alpine	Teams: (Netherlands) Renault Nederland	1984 Coupe d'Europe Renault 5 Alpine
Deutsche Rennsport Meisterschaft	(Germany) Stefan Bellof	1984 Deutsche Rennsport Meisterschaft
Deutschen Produktionswagen Meisterschaft	(Germany) Volker Strycek	1984 Deutschen Produktionswagen Meisterschaft
French Supertouring Championship	(France) Dany Snobeck	
New Zealand Touring Car Championship	(New Zealand) Gary Sprague	
AMSCAR Series	(Australia) Steve Masterton	
Stock Car Brasil	(Brazil) Paulo Gomes	1984 Stock Car Brasil season
TC2000 Championship	(Argentina) Mario Gayraud	1984 TC2000 Championship

== See also ==
- List of motorsport championships
- Auto racing
