= Maurice Dunne =

Maurice Dunne may refer to:

- Maurice Dunne (footballer)
- Maurice Dunne (racing driver)
