= 1981 in motorsport =

The following is an overview of the events of 1981 in motorsport including the major racing events, motorsport venues that were opened and closed during a year, championships and non-championship events that were established and disestablished in a year, and births and deaths of racing drivers and other motorsport people.

== Annual events ==
The calendar includes only annual major non-championship events or annual events that had significance separate from the championship. For the dates of the championship events see related season articles.

Date	Event	Ref
1–20 January	3rd Dakar Rally	
31 January-1 February	19th 24 Hours of Daytona	
15 February	23rd Daytona 500	
24 May	65th Indianapolis 500	
31 May	39th Monaco Grand Prix	
6–11 June	64th Isle of Man TT	
13–14 June	49th 24 Hours of Le Mans	
3–4 October	10th 24 Hours of Nurburgring	
25–26 July	33rd 24 Hours of Spa	
26 July	4th Suzuka 8 Hours	
5 October	22nd James Hardie 1000	
15 November	28th Macau Grand Prix	

== Births ==
Date	Month	Name	Nationality	Occupation	Note	Ref
1	January	Zsolt Baumgartner	Hungarian	Racing driver	The first Hungarian Formula One driver.	
24	February	Timo Bernhard	German	Racing driver	24 Hours of Le Mans winner (2010, 2017). FIA World Endurance champion (2015, 2017).	
1	March	Will Power	Australian	Racing driver	Winner of the Indianapolis 500 (2018).	
29	July	Fernando Alonso	Spanish	Racing driver	Formula One World Champion (2005-2006). FIA World Endurance champion (2018-19).	
30	July	Nicky Hayden	American	Motorcycle racer	MotoGP World champion (2006).	
19	October	Heikki Kovalainen	Finnish	Racing driver	2008 Hungarian Grand Prix winner.	
31	October	Mike Rockenfeller	German	Racing driver	24 Hours of Le Mans winner (2010). Le Mans Series champion (2008).	
19	November	André Lotterer	German	Racing driver	24 Hours of Le Mans winner (2011-2012, 2014). FIA World Endurance champion (2012).	

== Deaths ==
Date	Month	Name	Age	Nationality	Occupation	Note	Ref
1	January	Mauri Rose	84	American	Racing driver	Indianapolis 500 winner (1941, 1947-1948).	
9	January	Sammy Davis	93	British	Racing driver	24 Hours of Le Mans winner (1927).	
21	January	Cuth Harrison	74	British	Racing driver	One of the first British Formula One drivers.	
23	March	Mike Hailwood	40	British	Motorcycle racer	500cc Grand Prix motorcycle racing World champion (1962-1965).	
13	October	Philippe Étancelin	84	French	Racing driver	Winner of the 24 Hours of Le Mans (1934)	

== See also ==
- List of 1981 motorsport champions
