= Stephanie Richards =

Stephanie Richards may refer to:

- Stephanie Richards, wife of television personality Mike Richards
- Stephanie Richards, actress in Lookin' Italian
- Stephanie Richards, jazz trumpeter and composer with Relative Pitch Records
- Stephanie Richards, former wife of Gavin Wanganeen
- Stephanie Richards, a National Order of Merit recipient from New Zealand in 2011, headed Thales NZ
- Stephanie Richards, née Reber, Miss Utah USA, 1986
- Stephanie Richards, Australian rally car driver, competed in Victorian Rally Championship alongside Grant Walker.

== See also ==
- Stéphane Richard, French businessman
- Stephanie Garcia Richard, American politician
- Stephanie Richardson
