= Rotor Racing Cars =

Scottish racing car manufacturer

Rotor Racing Cars is a Scottish-based specialist manufacturer of single-seater racing cars, sports racing cars and road-going low volume sports cars.

== History ==
The Rotor JT7C competed in the BRSCC Formula Ford 2000 championship. A road-going version of the original Road Going Rotor JT7 also exists.

The vast majority of the output of the company was in the 1980s with the current output being greatly reduced.

As of the time of writing (Summer 2014) Rotor Racing Cars are currently building a Sports Libre hillclimb car and are involved in running a BMW Compact in the Scottish BMW Compact Cup.

== Activities ==
Rotor Racing Cars has historically been involved with the preparation of racing cars and among other championships has competed in the Scottish Formula Ford championship, Scottish Road Saloons championship and The British GT Championship. All Rotor Racing projects have been designed by Graham Millar who currently competes in the BRSCC Sports 2000 championship. It is not possible to either purchase a Rotor car or procure the services of Rotor Racing as it is a not-for-profit organisation.
