= Excel Rally =

The Excel Rally Series is a one-make rally series run in Australia. The series is based on the Hyundai Excel X3 (also known as the Hyundai Accent in other countries) and is the most popular one make rally series in Australia.

The Excel Rally Series has a Web site and forum where current and potential competitors can ask questions, discuss the cars and competition, and learn how to become involved.

== History ==
The Excel Rally Series was developed to be a replacement series to the aging Gemini Rally Series that has been around for two decades. The Excel series first started in NSW in 2005 where it aligned to the NSW Clubman rally series events.

Following a visit to the Bega Valley Rally in 2005 by Col Hardinge and John Carney from Victoria, both were impressed with these cars and after some discussion decided to take the idea to Victoria. After a meeting with interested people toward the end of 2005 there appeared to be sufficient interest to create a Victorian Series, including the cars in the highest level of State Rallying in Victoria through the Victorian Rally Championship. With corporate support from several sources including Hyundai Motor Corporation Australia, several cars were built during the summer of 2005/06.

The first appearance of the new cars was at a function to launch the Series at Wights Motor Group Traralgon. This was attended by several high-ranking Hyundai officials as well as two cars from the NSW Series. The first rally in Victoria for the series being the David Nutter Ford rally. It was not until the second rally being a very wet Cerberus Stages, which at the time was a day and night rally, that the full Excel field arrived.

Two years in the Excel Series in Victoria made up close to third of the field in any Victorian Rally Championship. Excel teams have also scooped the pool in many of the outright awards in the Championship.

== New South Wales ==
The NSW Excel Rally Series was first conducted in 2005. From 2007 RaceBrakes Sydney has been the series sponsor, but that sponsorship ended at the end of the 2009. For 2010, RallySchool.com.au took over sponsorship of the series.

Winners of the NSW Excel Series have been:

| Year | Driver | Co-driver |
|---|---|---|
| 2005 | Glenn Farrant | Jason Wood |
| 2006 | Mick Gillett | Marek Dzidowski |
| 2007 | Glenn Farrant | Anna Ritson |
| 2008 | Mick Gillett | Ben Cullen |
| 2009 | Fro Horobin/ Dave Roberts (tied) | Kirrilee Gentleman |
| 2010 | Dave Roberts | Kate Murphy |
| 2011 | Andrei Artamonov | Gleb Bonch-Osmolovskiy |
| 2014 | Joshua Hyde | Mel McMinn |
| 2015 | John Crowley | Andrew Crowley |
| 2016 | Aaron Mowett | Darren Mowett |
| 2017 | Andrew Crowley | John Crowley |
| 2018 | Damien Frizell | Tegan Meek |

== Victoria ==
Winners of the Victorian Excel Rally Series have been:

| Year | Driver | Co-driver |
|---|---|---|
| 2006 | Tom Kaitler | Loretta Kaitler |
| 2007 | Paul Batten | Craig Jones |
| 2008 | Ross Allan | Scott Allan |
| 2009 | Tony Moore | Nikki Moore |
| 2010 | Steven Mackenzie | Nikki Moore |
| 2011 | Steven Mackenzie | Brent Mackenzie |
| 2012 | Viv Dilkes-Frayne | Simon Barton-Ancliffe |
| 2013 | Viv Dilkes-Frayne | Richard Gill |
| 2014 | Andrew Murdoch Jnr | Simon Pilepich |
| 2015 | Andrew Murdoch Jnr | Jamie Allan |
| 2016 | Stephen Eccles | Simon Pilepich |
| 2017 | Brendan Hood | Richard Hood |
| 2018 | Josh Bohm | Anthony Staltari |
| 2019 | Lochlan Reed | Will Murphy |
| 2020 | COVID - Not Run | |
| 2021 | Lochlan Reed | Will Murphy |
| 2022 | Lucas Draper | Stephen Dunbar |
| 2023 | Brendan Hood | Richard Hood |

== Queensland ==
The Queensland Excel Rally Series was first conducted in 2008. GSL Rallysport has sponsored the Queensland Series since its inception and this support continues in 2010.

Past winners of the QLD Excel Series are as follows:

| Year | Driver | Co-driver |
|---|---|---|
| 2008 | Greg Latham | Nathan Long |
| 2009 | Ed Williams | Joseph Brennand |

== Excel Cup ==
From 2009, it was decided to hold a national event for Excels, open to all complying Excel Rally Cars from the states.

In 2009, the Bega Valley Rally was selected as the event for the inaugural "Excel Cup", being both a round of the 2009 RaceBrakes Sydney NSW Excel Rally Series, and the 2009 Hyundai Genuine Parts Victorian Excel Series. NSW driver Mick Gillett and navigator Harvey Smith won the event.

The 2010 Excel Cup was held at Rally Victoria, Warragul, the last Victorian round of the 2010 and included a round of the Australian Rally Championship. Victorian Driver, Tony Moore and Co-driver Nikki Moore won the event.
