= Osvaldo López =

Argentine racing driver

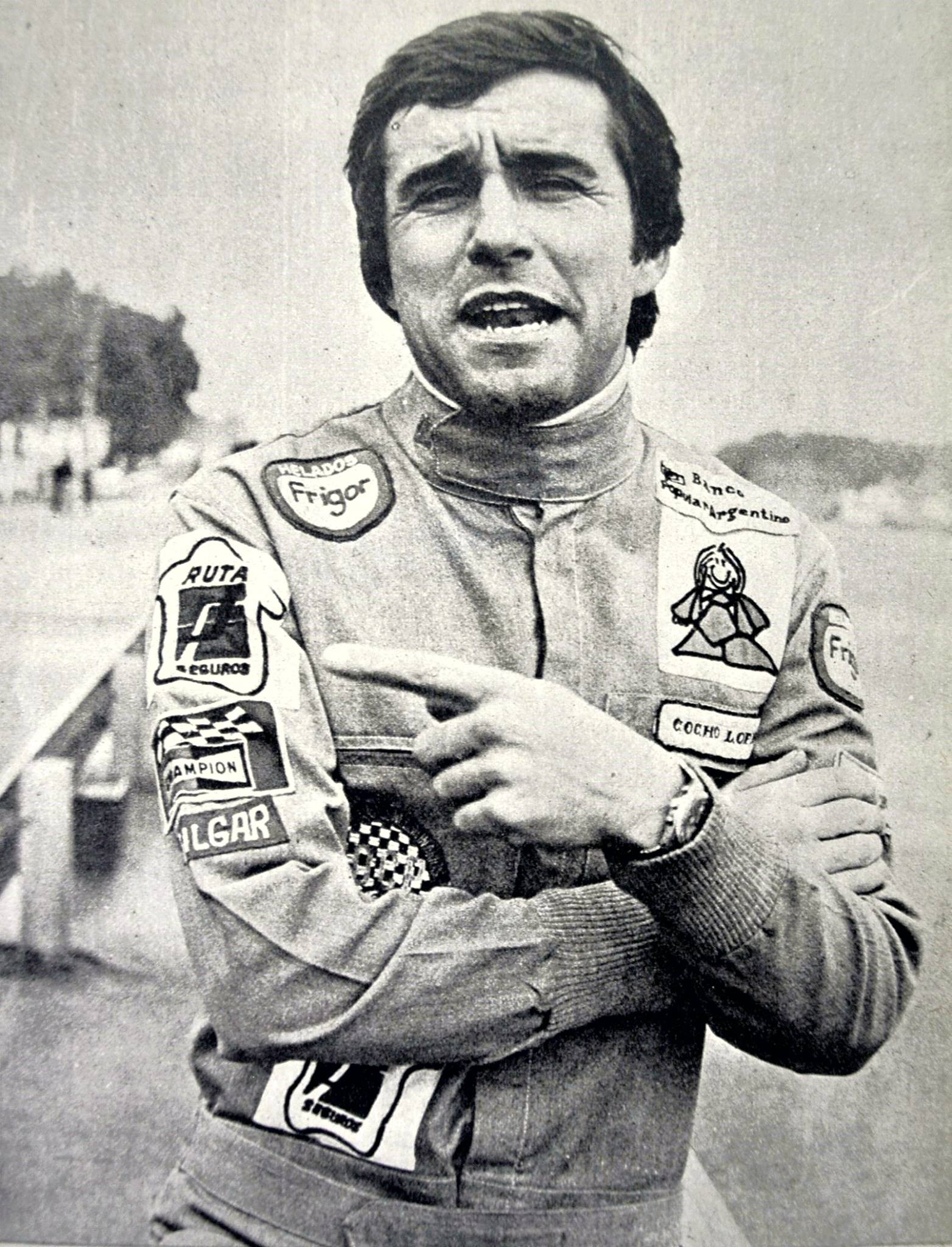
"Cocho" López in 1978

Osvaldo Abel "Cocho" López (born December 3, 1947, in Buenos Aires) is an Argentine retired racing driver. He began his career in 1967 and retired in the early 2000s.

López won the TC2000 championship in 1979 and he was runner-up in the South American Super Touring Car Championship in 1997 and 2000. He won other titles at Club Argentino de Pilotos and Formula 2 Argentina. He was in the 1993 24 Hours of Daytona with Team Argentina, sharing his car with Oscar Aventín, Osvaldo Morresi and Juan Manuel Landa.

His son Juan Manuel López is also a racing driver.

== Racing record ==
=== Complete European Formula Two Championship results ===
(key) (Races in bold indicate pole position; races in italics indicate fastest lap)

Year	Entrant	Chassis	Engine	1	2	3	4	5	6	7	8	9	10	11	12	Pos.	Pts
1979	BFO Racing Team	March 792	BMW	SIL	HOC	THR	NÜR	VAL	MUG	PAU	HOC	ZAN; 9	PER; Ret	MIS; 9	DON; Ret	NC	0

Sporting positions
Preceded by None	TC2000 champion 1979	Succeeded by Jorge Omar del Río
