= Victorian Rally Championship =

The Victorian Rally Championship was the evolution series of car rallies in Victoria, Australia. Prior to 1972, car rallies/trials relied heavily on the ability of a navigator to read a map and direct their driver over a planned course covering shire roads and forest tracks at night.

In 1972 the series evolved in line with the improvement of forest tracks, and the population of properties along Shire roads – into a more driver-oriented event.

Route instructions became comprehensive, making it easier for a crew to avoid getting lost, and results were effectively determined by how fast the drivers drove on the generally narrow forest roads.

Since 1990, many of these events have been held during daylight hours – making the competition more attractive to spectators.

At present, the Victorian Rally Championship includes awards for overall champion, two wheel drive champion, and class champions. Two single car make championships are associated with the Victorian Rally Championship: The Fiesta Rally Series and the Grant Walker Parts Excel Rally Series.

== Victorian Rally Champions ==
Winners of the Victorian Rally Championship and the preceding Victorian Trials Championship are as follows:

Year	Driver	Navigator/co-driver	Car
1961	Geoff Russell	Martin Hartigan	Volkswagen 1200
1962	Geoff Russell	R.H.Collingwood	Ford Falcon
1963	Harry Firth	Graham Hoinville	Ford Anglia
1963	Frank Kilfoyle	Mike Flanagan	Ford Falcon
1964	Frank Kilfoyle	Roger Abraham	Ford Falcon
1965	Harry Firth	Graham Hoinville	
1966	Tony Roberts	Peter Haas	HD Holden
1967	Reg Lunn*	Roger Vaughan *	HR Holden
1968	Bob Watson	Jim McAuliffe	HK Holden V8
1969	Bob Watson	Jim McAuliffe	Renault 16TS
1970	Bob Watson	Jim McAuliffe	Renault R8 Gordini
1971	Mal McPherson*	Peter Haas*	Renault R8 Gordini
1972**	Gil Davis*	Roger Bonhomme*	Holden Torana GTR XU1
1973	Bob Watson	Jeff Beaumont	Renault R12G, Holden HQ
1974	Garrie Harrowfield	Geoff Boyd	Ford Cortina
1975	David Bond	Ian Richards	Mitsubishi Lancer
1976	Bob Waterhouse	Paul Paterson	Datsun 1600
1977	Gil Davis	David Long	Datsun 1600
1978	Warwick Smith	Paul Paterson	Mitsubishi Lancer
1979	Warwick Smith	Paul Paterson	Mitsubishi Lancer
1980	Chris Brown	Simon Brown	Datsun 1600
1981	Geoff Portman	Ross Runnalls	Datsun Stanza
1982	Chris Brown	Noel Richards	Datsun 180B SSS
1983	David Officer	Kate Hobson	Mitsubishi Galant
1984	Peter A Thompson*	Anthony Sartory*	Datsun P510
1985	Brian Smith	John Birrell	Mitsubishi Sigma
1986	Geoff Portman	Peter Gale	Datsun 1600
1987	Geoff Portman	Peter Gale	Datsun 1600
1988	David Greig	Paul Tirant	Datsun P510
1989	Greg Hoinville	Michael Cains	Ford Escort Mk.2
1990	David Greig	Paul Tirant	Datsun 260Z
1991	Peter Fyfe	Gerry Bashford	Nissan Pulsar
1992	Peter Fyfe	Gerry Bashford	Nissan Pulsar
1993	Graeme Wise	Helen Wylie	Mitsubishi Lancer Evo
1994	Graeme Wise	Helen Wylie	Mitsubishi Lancer Evo
1995	Graeme Wise*	Greg Foletta*	Mitsubishi Lancer Evo
1996	Graeme Wise	Rob Beekman	Mitsubishi Lancer
1997	Mike Reeves	Robin Smalley	Mitsubishi Galant VR4
1998	Craig Morris	Jenny Cole	Mitsubishi Galant VR4
1999	Scott Pedder	Paul Humm	Mitsubishi Lancer Evo
2000	Scott Pedder	Paul Humm	Mitsubishi Lancer Evo 3
2001	David Stannus	Peter Campbell	Nissan Pulsar
2002	Brett Thompson	Rob Vanderee	Mitsubishi Galant VR4
2003	Mike Reeves	Robin Smalley	Mitsubishi Lancer Evo 3
2004	Peter Montgomery	Chris Montgomery	Subaru Impreza
2005	Justin Dowel	Matt Lee	Mitsubishi Lancer Evo 6
2006	Justin Dowel	Matt Lee	Mitsubishi Lancer Evo 6
2007	Justin Dowel	Matt Lee	Mitsubishi Lancer Evo 6
2008	Mark Fawcett	Simon Ellis	Subaru Impreza WRX
2009	Mark Fawcett	Carrie Morris	Subaru Impreza WRX
2010	Nathan Reeves	Scott Spedding	Subaru Impreza WRX
2011	Warren Lee	David Lethlean	Mitsubishi Lancer Evo 9
2012	Stephen Raymond	Glen Raymond	Toyota Corolla
2013	Tristan Penhall	Jolie Middleton	Subaru Impreza WRX
2014	Justin Dowel	Scott Spedding	Mitsubishi Lancer Evo X
2015	Darren Windus*	David Lethlean*	Subaru Impreza WRX
2016	Darren Windus	Joe Brkic	Mitsubishi Lancer Evo X
2017	Glen Raymond	Kate Catford	Subaru Impreza WRX STi
2018	Ben Hayes	Cathy Hayes	Subaru Impreza WRX STi
2019	Arron Windus	Daniel Brkic	Subaru Impreza WRX
2020	Not conducted		
2021	Darren Windus	Joe Brkic	Subaru Impreza WRX
2022	Adrian Stratford	Kain Manning	Subaru Impreza WRX
2023	Justin Dowel	Tracey Dewhurst	Mitsubishi Mirage

|- |2024 |Adrian Stratford |Anthony Staltari |Ford Fiesta G4 |}

* Driver and navigator were not from the same crew. ** Victorian Rally Championship introduced; previously, this was known as the Victorian Trials Championship.

Since 2003, there has been a separate Two Wheel Drive Championship contested as part of the Annual Championships. Winners of the Victorian 2WD Rally Championship are as follows:

Year	Driver	Navigator/co-driver
2003	Andrew Vibert	David Gallacher
2004	Ben Fawcett	Tony Boyd
2005	Brian Semmens	David Leoncini
2006	Brian Semmens	David Leoncini
2007	Brian Semmens	David Leoncini
2008	Andrew Taylor	Robin Smalley
2009	Brian Semmens	David Leoncini
2010	Alan Friend	Robin Smalley
2011	Brian Semmens	Dan Parry
2012	Brian Semmens	Dan Parry
2013	Brian Semmens	Dan Parry
2014	Justin Walker	Bianca Lowe
2015	Brian Semmens	Dan Parry
2016	Mike Conway	Jenny Cole
2017	Grant Walker	Steph Richards
2018	Grant Walker	Steph Richards
2019	Justin Walker	Adam Wright
2020	Not conducted	
2021	Adrian Stratford	Kain Manning
