= Maurice Dunne (racing driver) =

Irish racing driver

Maurice Dunne (born 23 December 1955) is a racing driver, active in years 1975-1989.

He is of Irish nationality, and lives in Rathfarnham, Dublin, Ireland.

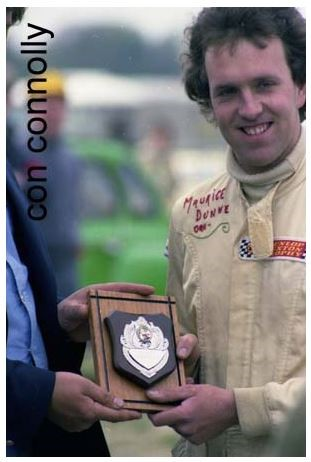
Dunne in 1980

== Career ==
=== 1975 ===
He started in the Mondello Racing Drivers School under John and Marijka Murphy in Mondello Park Donore, Co. Kildare on 29 November 1975, the same date as the death of racing driver Graham Hill.

=== 1976-1977 ===
He raced with Mondello Park Racing Driver School.

He suffered a crash in a Lotus 61 at Mondello Park.

=== 1978 ===
Driving a Crosslé 20F bought for £1000, he competed in the 1978 Irish Formula Ford Championship, won by Michael Roe.

He placed 3rd at the Phoenix Park Motor Races, Dublin 1978.

=== 1979 ===
Driving a Formula Ford Van Diemen, he competed at the Formula Ford Festival Brands Hatch 1979.

He loaned the car to David Griffin, who drove at the Phoenix Park Motor Races, Dublin 1979.

=== 1980 ===
In 1980 Dunne was under the management of Brian Tuite Racing, he won a number of Marlboro Driver of the Day awards at various meetings, culminating in the win of the 1980 Marlboro Driver of the Year award, presented by the Irish McLaren Formula 1 driver John Watson.

He won the 1980 Irish Formula Ford Championship sponsored by Irish Nationwide Building Society.

He drove a Formula Ford Van Diemen RF79 sponsored by Hales Freight Limited.

He raced at the 1980 Formula Ford Festival at Brands Hatch and was 2nd in Heat 1 and taken off in the Quarter Final by a Formula Ford from the 'TDC Builders' sponsored racing team.

He was offered a Formula 3 drive by Eddie Jordan after the win but declined because of a lack of sponsorship.

He won the Phoenix Park Motor Races, Dublin 1980, broadcast live on Raidió Teilifís Éireann.

The race featured Tommy Byrne with commentary from Eddie Jordan and Alan Tyndall of RPM.

He raced in the UK, at Brands Hatch, Oulton Park, and won two races at Aintree Race Track.

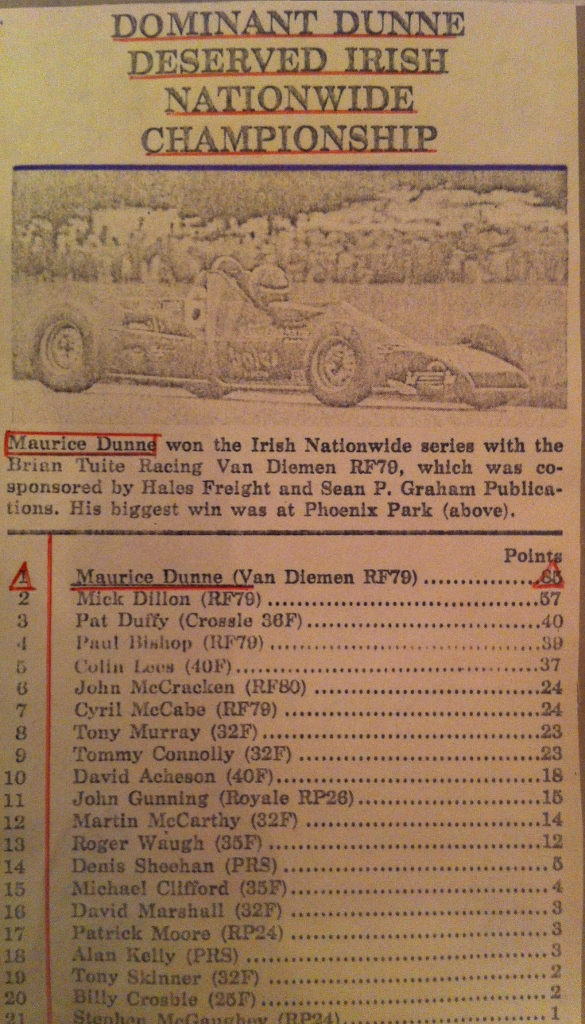
Irish Formula Ford Championship 1980

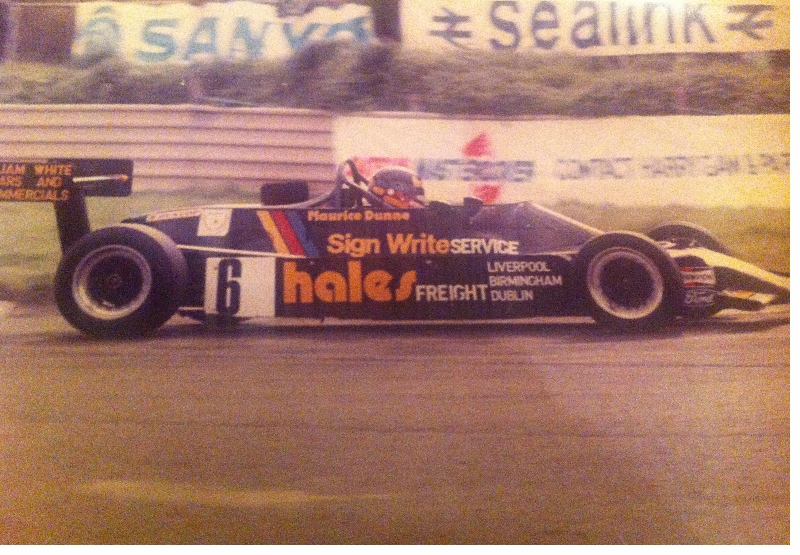
Maurice Dunne, Formula Ford 2000 1982

=== 1981 ===
He finished 6th in the Irish Formula Ford Championship driving a Delta.

The championship was won by Arnie Black with PJ Fallon in second place.

He was offered a drive by Ralph Firman Racing in the RF81 works Formula Ford 1660, but declined because of lack of financial backing.

=== 1982 ===
He drove the 1981 car of Tommy Byrne, an ex-works Formula Ford 2000 Van Diemen, and a pit crew composed of Fran Brady, Fran Hickey, Fergie and Susie McGee at Donington Park. He also finished third in the Irish Formula Ford 2000 Championship.

He competed in the Leinster Trophy in September 1982, at Mondello Park racing alongside the young Ayrton Senna who made an Irish appearance.

=== 1983 ===
Driving a Formula Ford 2000, he finished third in the Phoenix Park Motor Races, Dublin behind race winner Martin Donnelly. This was the debut race for future Formula One driver Eddie Irvine.

He also worked on the pit crew of David Manley at the 1983 European Grand Prix at Brands Hatch.

=== 1984 ===
He drove a 3-litre Ford Capri and a Formula Ford 1600 at various events including Mondello Park.

He was offered a position on a Le Mans car team for the 1984 24 Hours of Le Mans by a London-based team, but lacking financing, could not compete.

=== 1986 ===
He raced an 82F at the Phoenix Park Motor Races Dublin and some appearances at Mondello Park.

=== 1989 ===
He drove a PRS Formula Ford 1600 for Cliff Dempsey Racing in the Dun Laoghaire Street Circuit races, Dublin.

He raced at the Ballyjamesduff street circuit races in Dundalk, also entered by Stirling Moss, who made an Irish appearance.

=== Hillclimbing ===
He competed in various hillclimb events around Ireland.

=== Saloon racing ===
He appeared at Mondello Park in an Opel Kadett in 1981 and 1982, and in 1984 in a 3 Litre Ford Capri.
