= Jorge Omar del Río =

Argentine racing driver

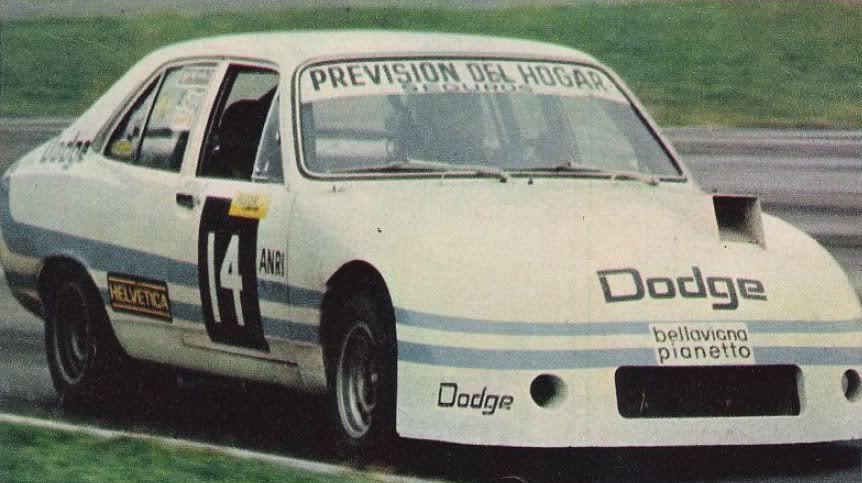

Jorge Omar del Río is an Argentine former racing driver. He won the TC2000 championship three times in succession between 1980 and 1982, and currently runs a racing school in Benavídez, Tigre Partido, Buenos Aires.

Sporting positions
Preceded by Osvaldo López	TC2000 champion 1980–1982	Succeeded by Rubén Luis di Palma
