= Scottish Formula Ford Championship =

- Category: Single seaters
- Country: United Kingdom
- Inaugural season: 1968
- Folded: 2014
- Engine suppliers: Ford

The Scottish Formula Ford Championship is a single seater open-wheel motorsport competition in Scotland. Championship events have been held since 1968, and there is a long pedigree involving 1600cc Ford Kent engined cars. By the mid-80s the FF1600 category was regarded as a mainstay of Scottish motor-racing. Despite variations in the format of the race meetings over the years, the Formula Ford class has remained popular among drivers. Several drivers have progressed to professional racing careers after gaining experience at this entry level.

Over the years, races have been held at Ingliston Motor Racing Circuit, near Edinburgh and the Knockhill Racing Circuit in Fife. The events are organised by the Scottish Motor Racing Club as part of meetings where the programme features a range of categories.

In the early 1980s the races were watched by crowds that were 6000 strong. In 2013 the races have crowds of around 3,000 spectators recorded.

== History ==
Since the championship was established in the 1960s, many competitors have had their performance at these events noticed, and gone on to race in higher level competitions, including Formula one. The championship has allowed competitors to be tested at faster speeds than karting, with vehicles able to reach a top-speed of 140 mph, compared to the kart's 80 mph.

Events were initially held at the Ingliston Motor Racing Circuit but this track ceased to be used for regular motor sport events in 1992.

Popular chassis for these events have included those manufactured by Crosslé and Van Diemen.

In 1985 the championship saw the debut of Scotland's first home-built racing car, the "Rotor". The Rotor-Motive team continued to compete in the championship and were Scotland's only full-time professional racing manufacturer.

== Championship format ==
In 2014 there are two classes – one for current cars and another for older 'Classic' cars built before 31 December 1989. There is also a Newcomers Cup which is open to drivers in their first or second year of open wheel competition.

In 2014 there were 15 rounds of racing. In one of the final rounds of the championship, competitors are also racing for the David Leslie Trophy named in memory of Scottish BTCC driver. The Angel Burgueño Trophy is awarded to the driver who completes the fastest lap.

Action from the races has been screened by Sky and Virgin Media channel Motors TV.

== Champions ==
In 1969 Tom Walkinshaw won the championship in a Hawke DL2. then moved on to race in Formula 3.

After winning a few Scottish motocross titles, Stewart Roden then won the Scottish Formula Ford Championship five times. This led to him being offered a place in Eddie Jordan's F3 team in 1988, although he only drove once before being left unable to continue as he had run out of money.

In 2011, Ken Thirlwall, was the first person to win every race of the season, also winning the championship in only his 2nd Formula Ford season.

In 2014, Ciaran Haggerty became Scotland's youngest ever Formula Ford champion. Haggerty had enjoyed the support of the retired racing driver Dario Franchitti.

List of Champions:

Season	Champion	Constructor	Classic Car	Newcomer's cup
2014	Ciaran Haggerty		Ivor Mairs	Adam Mackay
2013	Stuart Thorburn		Ivor Mairs	Ciaran Haggerty
2012	Ross McEwan			Jordan Gronkowski
2011	Kenneth Thirlwall			
2010	Craig Brunton			
2009	Rory Butcher			
2008	Graham Carroll	Van Diemen RF90		
2005	Joe Tanner			
2003				Jonathan Adam
1998	Stewart Roden			Stuart Robertson
1997	Stewart Roden			
1996	Jim Forsyth			
1995	Ricki Steedman			
1986	Cameron Binnie	Van Diemen		
1985	Cameron Binnie			
1983	Tom Brown	Van Diemen		
1982	Vic Covey			
1981	Vic Covey			
1980	Tom Brown			
1969	Tom Walkinshaw	Hawke DL2		
1968	Dave Walker			
