= Lee Shepherd =

American drag racing driver (1944–1985)

Lee Alan Shepherd (August 30, 1944 – March 11, 1985) was an American drag racing driver from Arlington, Texas.

In 1972, Shepherd drove a lime green Chevy Nova station wagon to the Modified finals at the National Hot Rod Association (NHRA) Springnationals, also claiming Modified Eliminator (making the Nova the quickest car at the event). Later in 1972, he teamed with David Reher and Buddy Morrison. The three Texans pooled their limited resources and forged a longstanding partnership after Bobby Cross left the team to pursue his own business ventures. The Reher-Morrison-Shepherd team won NHRA's Division 4 Modified championship in 1973, and took a class win at the 1974 Winternationals in a pumpkin orange Chevrolet-powered F/Gas Ford Maverick. Shepherd ran back-to-back 10.67s to defeat John Smith’s M/Gas Volkswagen and defending event champion Bob Riffle’s C/Gas Dodge Colt. In the quarterfinal, he bested Carl Frizzell’s E/MP Camaro with a 10.66 and former Winternationals winner Fred Teixeira’s B/Gas Corvette with a 10.49. In the final, Shepherd unleashed a pass of 10.39 seconds at 130.62 mph (210.21 km/h), defeating Jim Marshall’s A/MP Dart and good enough to set an F/Gas national record.

In 1975, the Texans borrowed a Chevrolet Corvette body, transplanted the Maverick's powertrain, and recorded another Modified victory at the 1975 Springnationals, as well as taking Modified Eliminator, making the Reher-Morrison Corvette the quickest Modified of the event.

The team campaigned a Chevrolet Camaro to win four consecutive NHRA national championships from 1981 to 1984.

Shepherd would return to win the Winternationals twice in Pro Stock, in 1980 and 1984, while the team won 26 of 56 national events and four championships in that period.

In 1983, Shepherd became the first driver to win both the NHRA and IHRA Pro Stock championships in the same year, a feat that had never before been achieved; he did it again in 1984.

In March 1985, on his way to a fifth straight Pro Stock championship, Shepherd was killed while testing his car in Ardmore, Oklahoma. Sources cited attribute his death to the failure of his seat belt/racing harness. At the Gatornationals, the next event on the NHRA calendar, the qualifiers in Pro Stock lined up on the track before the start of eliminations in a missing man formation with the pole position being left open for Lee Shepherd. In 2001, a panel ranked Shepherd twelfth in the National Hot Rod Association Top 50 Drivers, 1951–2000.

Over his career, Shepherd won at every NHRA national event, recording a record of 173 wins to 47 losses, including reaching the final round in 44 national events, winning 26 times. He is buried in Mount Olivet Cemetery in Fort Worth, Texas.

Preceded by Pete Robinson 1971	NHRA FullThrottle Drag Racing fatalities 1985	Succeeded by Blaine Johnson 1996
