= Irish Formula Ford Championship =

Motorsport competition in Ireland

The Irish Formula Ford Championship, which is affiliated to Motorsport Ireland is run on various Irish circuits including Mondello Park, Kirkistown, Phoenix Park Motor Racing Circuit and Nutts Corner.

== Championship Winners ==
- 1978 - Michael Roe
- 1979 - Colin Lees
- 1980 - Maurice Dunne
- 1981 - Arnie Black
