= Attila Ferjáncz =

Hungarian rally driver

Attila Ferjáncz (12 July 1946 – 23 April 2016) was a Hungarian rally driver. He won the Hungarian Rally Championship series from 1976 to 1982 and in 1985 and 1990. In 2000, he was awarded the Knight's Cross of the Hungarian Order of Merit.
