= Hungarian Rally Championship =

Motorsport competition in Hungary

- Country: Hungary
- Inaugural season: 1974
- Drivers' champion: (Hungary) Simone Tempestini (2024)
- Official website: MNASZ

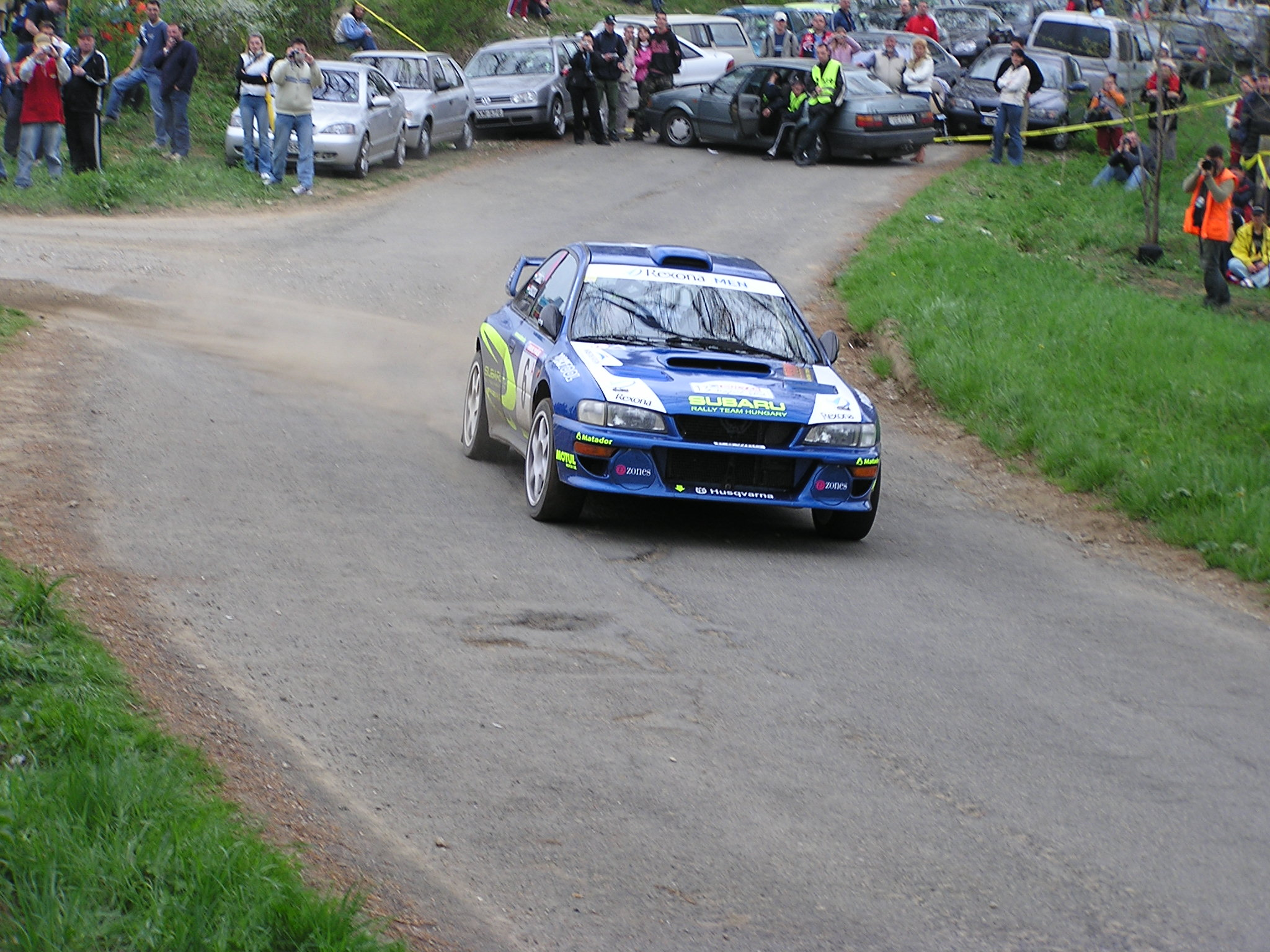
Norbert Herczig during 2006 Miskolc Rally

Magyar Ralibajnokság is the annual series of Hungarian Rally Championships existing since 1974. As of 2024, the championship consists of 8 events on different surfaces (five on tarmac, three on gravel) . The organiser and owner of the cycle is MNASZ (Magyar Nemzeti Autósport Szövetség, which means Hungarian National Motor Union).

== Champions ==
Season	Driver	Co-driver	Car	Team
1974	Mihály Balatoni	István Sándor	Škoda	Volán SC
1975	?	?		
1976	Attila Ferjáncz	Ferenc Iriczfalvy	Renault 17 Gordini	Volán SC
1977	Attila Ferjáncz	János Tandari		Volán SC
1978	Attila Ferjáncz	János Tandari	Renault 5 Alpine	Volán SC
1979	Attila Ferjáncz	János Tandari	Renault 5 Alpine	Volán SC
1980	Attila Ferjáncz	János Tandari	Renault 5 Alpine	Volán SC
1981	Attila Ferjáncz	János Tandari	Renault 5 Alpine	Volán SC
1982	Attila Ferjáncz	János Tandari		Volán SC
1983	János Hideg	Zoltán Kecskeméti	Lada	Kaposvári KSE
1984	János Hideg	Attila Bán	Lada	Volán-Surján SE
1985	Attila Ferjáncz	János Tandari		Váci AJ
1986	László Németh	András Jójárt		Váci AJ
1987	László Ranga	Mihály Dudás	Lada VFTS	Pannon Volán SC
1988	László Ranga	Mihály Dudás	Audi Quattro	Novotrade-Navigátor
1989	György Selmeczi	József Jutassy	Audi Quattro	Novotrade-Navigátor
1990	Attila Ferjáncz	János Tandari		Novotrade-Navigátor
1991	László Ranga	Ernő Büki	Lancia Delta Integrale	MHB Rallye Team
1992	László Ranga	Ernő Büki	Lancia Delta Integrale	MHB Rallye Team
1993	László Ranga	Ernő Büki	Lancia Delta Integrale	Marlboro Rallye Team
1994	László Ranga	Ernő Büki	Lancia Delta Integrale	Marlboro Rallye Team
1995	János Tóth	Ferenc Gergely	Toyota Celica	Aral Colonia Rallye Team
1996	János Tóth	Ferenc Gergely	Toyota Celica	Aral Colonia Rallye Team
1997	János Tóth	Ferenc Gergely	Toyota Celica	Aral Colonia Rallye Team
1998	Ferenc Kiss	Ernő Büki	Subaru Impreza WRC	Mol Rally Team
1999	Ferenc Kiss	Ernő Büki	Subaru Impreza WRC	Mol Rally Team
2000	János Tóth	Imre Tóth	Peugeot 206 WRC	Symphonia Rally Team
2001	János Tóth	Imre Tóth	Peugeot 206 WRC	Symphonia Rally Team
2002	János Tóth	Imre Tóth	Peugeot 206 WRC	Bomba! Rally Team
2003	Balázs Benik	Pál Somogyi	Ford Focus WRC	OMV Benik Rally Team
2004	Tamás Turi	István Kerék	Škoda Octavia WRC	Turi Rally Team
2005	János Tóth	Bea Bahor	Peugeot 206 WRC	Peugeot-Total-Pirelli Rally Team
2006	Balázs Benik	István Varga	Ford Focus WRC	OMV Benik Rally Team
2007	Balázs Benik	István Varga	Ford Focus WRC	OMV Benik Rally Team
2008	Csaba Spitzmüller	Miklós Kazár	Mitsubishi Lancer WRC	HELL Racing Team
2009	Norbert Herczig	László Baranyai	Subaru Impreza WRC	Subaru Rally Team Hungary
2010	György Aschenbrenner	Zsuzsa Pikó	Mitsubishi Lancer Evolution IX	Asi Rally Club
2011	György Aschenbrenner	Zsuzsa Pikó	Mitsubishi Lancer Evolution IX	Martevo Kft.
2012	Miklós Kazár	Ramón Ferencz	Mitsubishi Lancer Evolution IX	Maximmun Racing Team
2013	Miklós Kazár	Tamás Szőke	Citroën Xsara WRC	Maximmun Racing Team
2014	Miklós Kazár	Tamás Szőke	Ford Fiesta R5	Maximmun Racing Team
2015	Norbert Herczig	Igor Bacigál	Škoda Fabia R5	Skoda Rally Team Hungary
