= Deutsche Rallye Meisterschaft =

- Category: Rallying
- Country: West Germany; Germany
- Drivers' champion: (Germany) Philip Geipel (2022)
- Official website: DRM

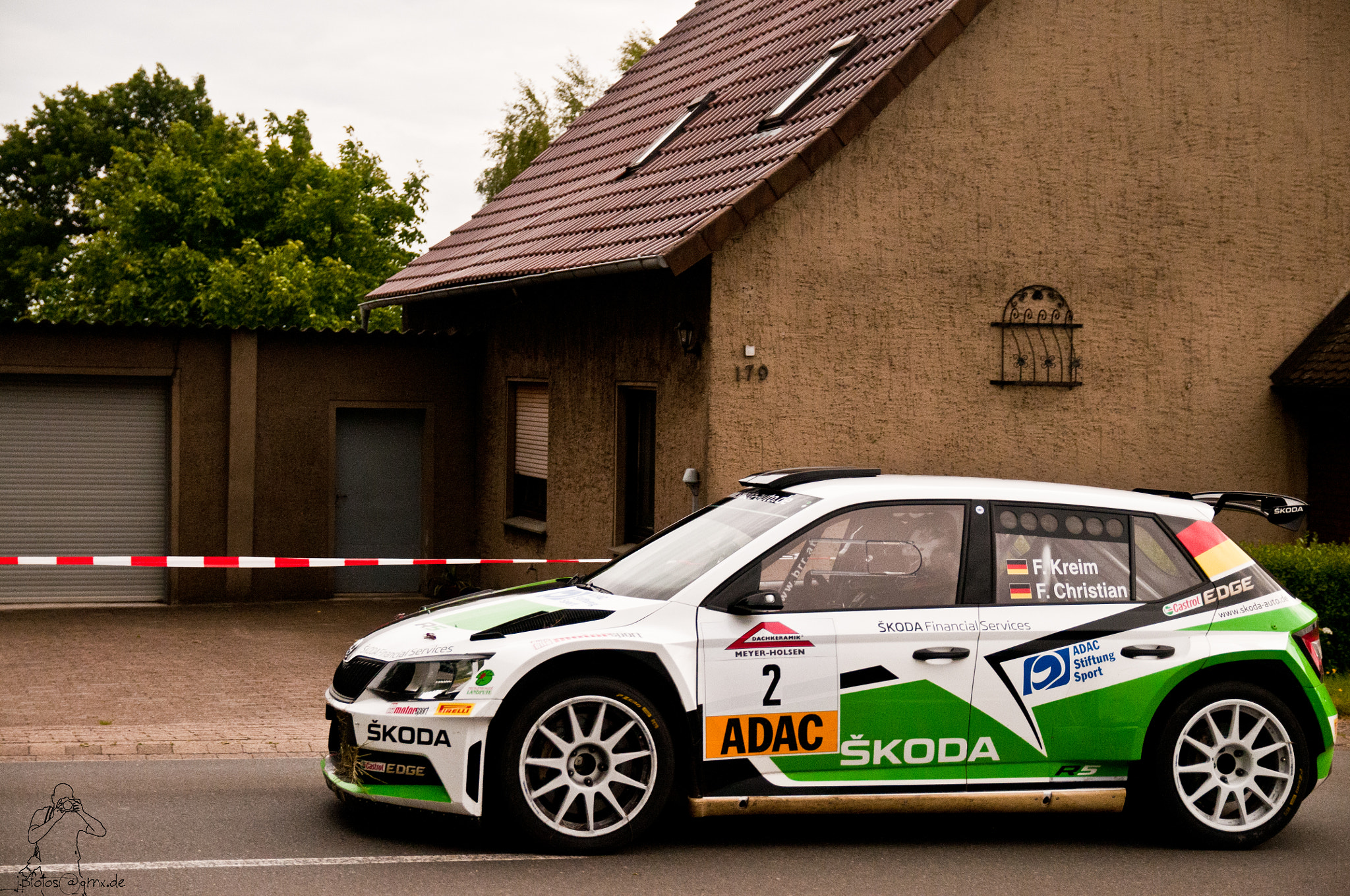
Three times champion Fabian Kreim at the 2015 ADAC Rallye Stemweder Berg

The Deutsche Rallye Meisterschaft (occasionally German Rally Championship or DRM) is Germany's and was West Germany's leading domestic motor rally competition. While having a background in dirt-surface off-road events the modern DRM is a tarmac rally competition, a condition it shares with Germany's World Rally Championship event Rallye Deutschland.

== History ==
The history of the Deutsche Rallye Meisterschaft dates back to the 1950s, when the rallies were run differently than they are today. At that time, these rallies were more reliability and orientation drives. The Hessian Rally and the Olympic Rally in 1972 are considered the first rallies of the type that were later typical of the process and are for the Deutsche Rallye Meisterschaft. After the Deutsche Rallye Meisterschaft was suspended in 2006, it has been held again since 2007.

== Champions ==
Sourced from:

Season	Driver	Car
1970	(West Germany) Helmut Bein	BMW 2002 TI
1971	(West Germany) Achim Warmbold	BMW 2002 TI
1972	(West Germany) Reiner Zweibäumer	BMW 1602
1973	(West Germany) Gerd Behret	Porsche Carrera
1974	(Sweden) Lars Carlsson	Opel Ascona A
1975	(West Germany) Reiner Altenheimer	Porsche Carrera
1976	(West Germany) Heinz-Walter Schewe	Porsche Carrera
1977	(West Germany) Ludwig Kuhn	Porsche Carrera
1978	(West Germany) Reinhard Hainbach	Ford Escort RS1800
1979	(West Germany) Reinhard Hainbach	Ford Escort RS1800
1980	(West Germany) Achim Warmbold	Toyota Celica 2000 GTR
1981	(West Germany) Alfons Stock	Volkswagen Golf GTI 16V
1982	(West Germany) Harald Demuth	Audi Quattro
1983	(West Germany) Erwin Weber	Opel Manta 400
1984	(West Germany) Harald Demuth	Audi Quattro
1985	(Sweden) Kalle Grundel	Peugeot 205 Turbo 16
1986	(France) Michèle Mouton	Peugeot 205 Turbo 16
1987	(West Germany) Armin Schwarz	Audi Coupé Quattro
1988	(Germany) Armin Schwarz	Audi 200 Quattro
1989	(Austria) Sepp Haider	Opel Kadett GSi 16V
1990	(Germany) Ronald Holzer	Lancia Delta Integrale
1991	(Germany) Erwin Weber	Volkswagen Rallye-Golf G60
1992	(Germany) Dieter Depping	Ford Sierra RS Cosworth
1993	(Germany) Dieter Depping	Ford Escort RS Cosworth
1994	(Germany) Dieter Depping	Ford Escort RS Cosworth
1995	(Germany) Hermann Gassner Sr	Mitsubishi Galant VR-4
1996	(Germany) Armin Kremer	Mitsubishi Lancer Evolution
1997	(Germany) Matthias Kahle	Toyota Corolla WRC
1998	(Germany) Armin Kremer	Subaru Impreza WRC
1999	(Germany) Armin Kremer	Subaru Impreza WRC
2000	(Germany) Matthias Kahle	SEAT Córdoba WRC
2001	(Germany) Matthias Kahle	SEAT Córdoba WRC
2002	(Germany) Matthias Kahle	Škoda Octavia WRC
2003	(Germany) Hermann Gassner Sr	Mitsubishi Carisma GT VII
2004	(Germany) Matthias Kahle	Škoda Octavia WRC
2005	(Germany) Matthias Kahle	Škoda Fabia WRC
2006		
2007	(Germany) Hermann Gassner Sr	Mitsubishi Lancer Evolution IX
2008	(Germany) Hermann Gassner Sr	Mitsubishi Lancer Evolution IX
2009	(Germany) Hermann Gassner Jr	Mitsubishi Lancer Evolution IX
2010	(Germany) Matthias Kahle	Škoda Fabia S2000
2011	(Germany) Sandro Wallenwein	Subaru Impreza WRX STI
2012	(Germany) Mark Wallenwein	Škoda Fabia S2000
2013	(Germany) Georg Berlandy	Peugeot 207 S2000
2014	(Germany) Ruben Zeltner	Porsche 997 GT3
2015	(Germany) Ruben Zeltner	Porsche 997 GT3
2016	(Germany) Fabian Kreim	Škoda Fabia R5
2017	(Germany) Fabian Kreim	Škoda Fabia R5
2018	(Germany) Marijan Griebel	Peugeot 208 T16
2019	(Germany) Fabian Kreim	Škoda Fabia R5
2020	Season cancelled due to COVID-19 pandemic	
2021	(Germany) Marijan Griebel	Citroën C3 Rally2
2022	(Germany) Philip Geipel	Škoda Fabia Rally2 evo
2023	(Germany) Marijan Griebel	Škoda Fabia RS Rally2
