= List of winners of Triple Crown of Motorsport races =

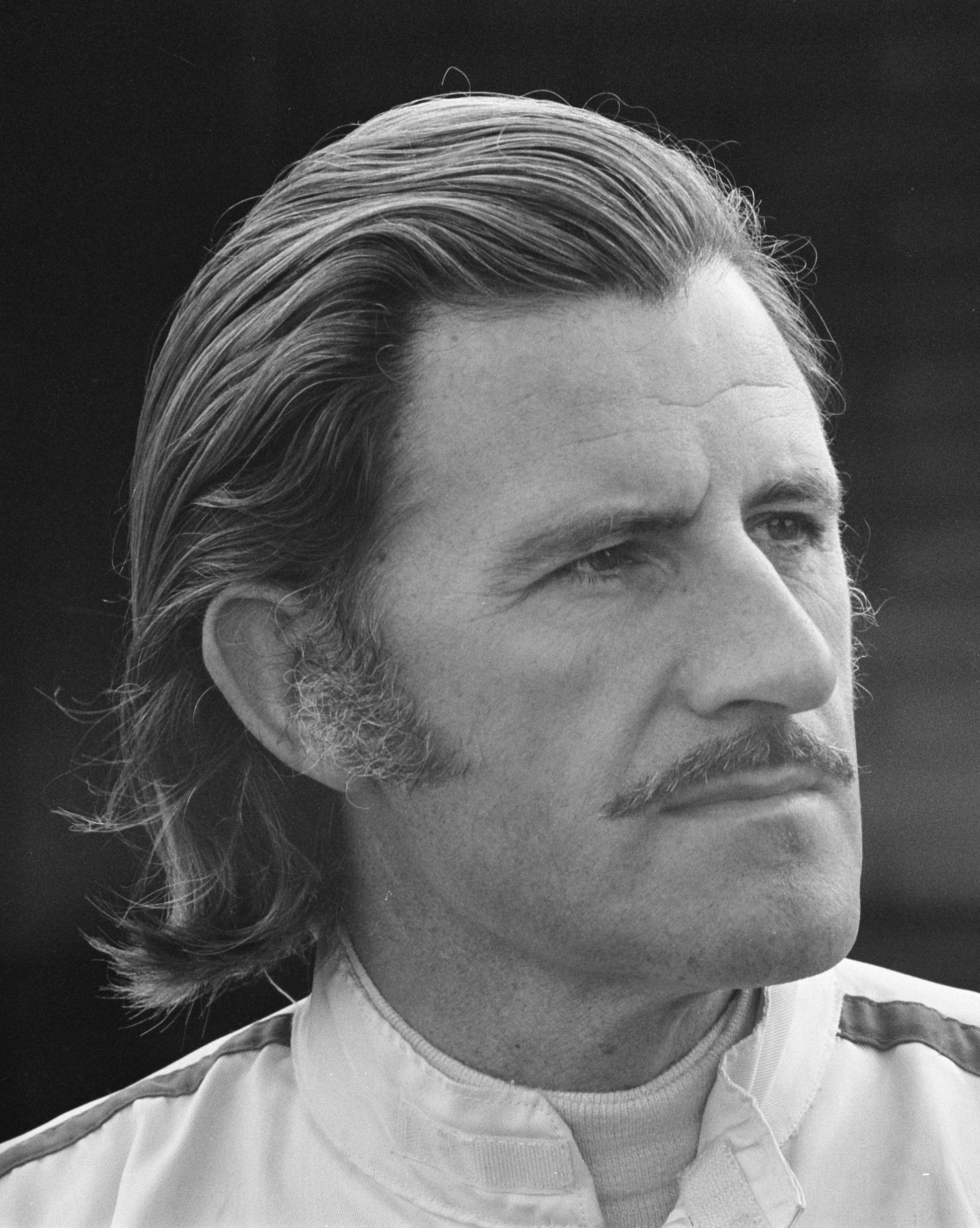
Graham Hill is the only driver to have achieved the Triple Crown of Motorsport.

The Triple Crown of Motorsport is an unofficial achievement for motor racing drivers that is generally regarded as winning motorsport's three most prestigious races. (Note: An alternative definition of the Triple Crown is victory in the 24 Hours of Le Mans, the Formula One World Drivers' Championship and the Indianapolis 500. Graham Hill is the only driver to have completed the Triple Crown under either definition.) These annual events are the 24 Hours of Le Mans endurance race at the Circuit de la Sarthe, the Indianapolis 500 for American open-wheel racing cars at the Indianapolis Motor Speedway, and the Monaco Grand Prix for Formula One cars at the Circuit de Monaco. The Indianapolis 500 was introduced in 1911, followed by the 24 Hours of Le Mans in 1923 and the Monaco Grand Prix in 1929. All of the races are held between the months of May and June. As the Indianapolis 500 and the Monaco Grand Prix are both traditionally held on the last weekend of May, it is impossible for modern drivers to enter all three Triple Crown events in the same year. No trophy is awarded to the driver who completes the Triple Crown.

As of 2026, 269 drivers from 25 different countries have won a Triple Crown race and only Graham Hill has completed the Triple Crown. Tom Kristensen has won the most Triple Crown races with nine victories, all at the 24 Hours of Le Mans, which is a record for the most victories at the event; Hill claimed two fewer in total, including five victories at Monaco. Ayrton Senna won six Triple Crown events, all at the Monaco Grand Prix, placing him alongside Jacky Ickx in joint-third overall and breaking Hill's record for the most race wins at Monaco. With four victories each, Hélio Castroneves, A. J. Foyt, Rick Mears and Al Unser hold the joint record for the most Indianapolis 500 wins.

There have been 19 drivers who have partaken in all three Triple Crown races and have achieved victory in at least one of them. No one has won all three Triple Crown races during the course of a calendar year. Fernando Alonso, Foyt, Bruce McLaren, Juan Pablo Montoya, Tazio Nuvolari, Jochen Rindt and Maurice Trintignant are the seven drivers to have won two of the three Triple Crown events. Of those seven, only Montoya has won both the Indianapolis 500 and the Monaco Grand Prix, while only Foyt has won both the 24 Hours of Le Mans and the Indianapolis 500. The remaining five won both the 24 Hours of Le Mans and the Monaco Grand Prix. Foyt in 1967 is the only driver to have won two of the races in the same year: Indianapolis 500 and 24 Hours of Le Mans.

== Winners ==
Key
*	Driver has completed the Triple Crown of Motorsport

Triple Crown of Motorsport race winners
Year	Indianapolis 500		Monaco Grand Prix		24 Hours of Le Mans	
Year	Nationality	Driver	Nationality	Driver	Nationality	Driver
1911	United States	Ray Harroun (Note: Cyrus Patschke, Don Herr, Howdy Wilcox and Norman Batten all temporarily took over driving duties from Harroun (1911), Dawson (1912), Milton (1923) and DePaolo (1925) respectively. All four relief drivers have not been officially recognised as winners of the Indianapolis 500.)	Not yet founded		Not yet founded	
1912	United States	Joe Dawson	Not yet founded		Not yet founded	
1913	France	Jules Goux	Not yet founded		Not yet founded	
1914	France	René Thomas	Not yet founded		Not yet founded	
1915	United States	Ralph DePalma	Not yet founded		Not yet founded	
1916	United Kingdom	Dario Resta	Not yet founded		Not yet founded	
1917	Not held due to World War I		Not yet founded		Not yet founded	
1918	Not held due to World War I		Not yet founded		Not yet founded	
1919	United States	Howdy Wilcox	Not yet founded		Not yet founded	
1920	United States	Gaston Chevrolet	Not yet founded		Not yet founded	
1921	United States	Tommy Milton	Not yet founded		Not yet founded	
1922	United States	Jimmy Murphy	Not yet founded		Not yet founded	
1923	United States	Tommy Milton	Not yet founded		France	André Lagache
1923	United States	Tommy Milton	Not yet founded		France	René Léonard
1924	United States	Joe Boyer	Not yet founded		United Kingdom	Frank Clement
1924	United States	Lora L. Corum	Not yet founded		Canada	John Duff
1925	United States	Pete DePaolo	Not yet founded		France	Gérard de Courcelles
1925	United States	Pete DePaolo	Not yet founded		France	André Rossignol
1926	United States	Frank Lockhart	Not yet founded		France	Robert Bloch
1926	United States	Frank Lockhart	Not yet founded		France	André Rossignol
1927	United States	George Souders	Not yet founded		United Kingdom	Dudley Benjafield
1927	United States	George Souders	Not yet founded		United Kingdom	Sammy Davis
1928	United States	Louis Meyer	Not yet founded		United Kingdom	Woolf Barnato
1928	United States	Louis Meyer	Not yet founded		Australia	Bernard Rubin
1929	United States	Ray Keech	United Kingdom	William Grover-Williams	United Kingdom	Woolf Barnato
1929	United States	Ray Keech	United Kingdom	William Grover-Williams	United Kingdom	Henry Birkin
1930	United States	Billy Arnold	France	René Dreyfus	United Kingdom	Woolf Barnato
1930	United States	Billy Arnold	France	René Dreyfus	United Kingdom	Glen Kidston
1931	United States	Louis Schneider	Monaco	Louis Chiron	United Kingdom	Henry Birkin
1931	United States	Louis Schneider	Monaco	Louis Chiron	United Kingdom	Earl Howe
1932	United States	Fred Frame	Italy	Tazio Nuvolari	Italy	Luigi Chinetti
1932	United States	Fred Frame	Italy	Tazio Nuvolari	France	Raymond Sommer
1933	United States	Louis Meyer	Italy	Achille Varzi	Italy	Tazio Nuvolari
1933	United States	Louis Meyer	Italy	Achille Varzi	France	Raymond Sommer
1934	United States	Bill Cummings	France	Guy Moll	Italy	Luigi Chinetti
1934	United States	Bill Cummings	France	Guy Moll	France	Philippe Étancelin
1935	United States	Kelly Petillo	Italy	Luigi Fagioli	United Kingdom	Johnny Hindmarsh
1935	United States	Kelly Petillo	Italy	Luigi Fagioli	United Kingdom	Luis Fontés
1936	United States	Louis Meyer	Germany	Rudolf Caracciola	Not held due to worker strikes	
1937	United States	Wilbur Shaw	Germany	Manfred von Brauchitsch	France	Robert Benoist
1937	United States	Wilbur Shaw	Germany	Manfred von Brauchitsch	France	Jean-Pierre Wimille
1938	United States	Floyd Roberts	Not held		France	Eugène Chaboud
1938	United States	Floyd Roberts	Not held		France	Jean Trémoulet
1939	United States	Wilbur Shaw	Not held		France	Pierre Veyron
1939	United States	Wilbur Shaw	Not held		France	Jean-Pierre Wimille
1940	United States	Wilbur Shaw	Not held due to World War II		Not held due to World War II	
1941	United States	Floyd Davis	Not held due to World War II		Not held due to World War II	
1941	United States	Mauri Rose	Not held due to World War II		Not held due to World War II	
1942	Not held due to World War II		Not held due to World War II		Not held due to World War II	
1943	Not held due to World War II		Not held due to World War II		Not held due to World War II	
1944	Not held due to World War II		Not held due to World War II		Not held due to World War II	
1945	Not held due to World War II		Not held due to World War II		Not held due to World War II	
1946	United States	George Robson	Not held due to World War II		Not held due to World War II	
1947	United States	Mauri Rose	Not held due to World War II		Not held due to World War II	
1948	United States	Mauri Rose	Italy	Giuseppe Farina	Not held due to World War II	
1949	United States	Bill Holland	Not held		United States	Luigi Chinetti
1949	United States	Bill Holland	Not held		United Kingdom	Peter Mitchell-Thomson
1950	United States	Johnnie Parsons	Argentina	Juan Manuel Fangio	France	Jean-Louis Rosier
1950	United States	Johnnie Parsons	Argentina	Juan Manuel Fangio	France	Louis Rosier
1951	United States	Lee Wallard	Not held		United Kingdom	Peter Walker
1951	United States	Lee Wallard	Not held		United Kingdom	Peter Whitehead
1952	United States	Troy Ruttman	Italy	Vittorio Marzotto	Germany	Hermann Lang
1952	United States	Troy Ruttman	Italy	Vittorio Marzotto	Germany	Fritz Riess
1953	United States	Bill Vukovich	Not held		United Kingdom	Duncan Hamilton
1953	United States	Bill Vukovich	Not held		United Kingdom	Tony Rolt
1954	United States	Bill Vukovich	Not held		Argentina	José Froilán González
1954	United States	Bill Vukovich	Not held		France	Maurice Trintignant
1955	United States	Bob Sweikert	France	Maurice Trintignant	United Kingdom	Ivor Bueb
1955	United States	Bob Sweikert	France	Maurice Trintignant	United Kingdom	Mike Hawthorn
1956	United States	Pat Flaherty	United Kingdom	Stirling Moss	United Kingdom	Ron Flockhart
1956	United States	Pat Flaherty	United Kingdom	Stirling Moss	United Kingdom	Ninian Sanderson
1957	United States	Sam Hanks	Argentina	Juan Manuel Fangio	United Kingdom	Ivor Bueb
1957	United States	Sam Hanks	Argentina	Juan Manuel Fangio	United Kingdom	Ron Flockhart
1958	United States	Jimmy Bryan	France	Maurice Trintignant	Belgium	Olivier Gendebien
1958	United States	Jimmy Bryan	France	Maurice Trintignant	United States	Phil Hill
1959	United States	Rodger Ward	Australia	Jack Brabham	United States	Roy Salvadori
1959	United States	Rodger Ward	Australia	Jack Brabham	United States	Carroll Shelby
1960	United States	Jim Rathmann	United Kingdom	Stirling Moss	France	Paul Frère
1960	United States	Jim Rathmann	United Kingdom	Stirling Moss	Belgium	Olivier Gendebien
1961	United States	A. J. Foyt	United Kingdom	Stirling Moss	Belgium	Olivier Gendebien
1961	United States	A. J. Foyt	United Kingdom	Stirling Moss	United States	Phil Hill
1962	United States	Rodger Ward	New Zealand	Bruce McLaren	Belgium	Olivier Gendebien
1962	United States	Rodger Ward	New Zealand	Bruce McLaren	United States	Phil Hill
1963	United States	Parnelli Jones	United Kingdom	Graham Hill*	Italy	Lorenzo Bandini
1963	United States	Parnelli Jones	United Kingdom	Graham Hill*	Italy	Ludovico Scarfiotti
1964	United States	A. J. Foyt	United Kingdom	Graham Hill*	France	Jean Guichet
1964	United States	A. J. Foyt	United Kingdom	Graham Hill*	Italy	Nino Vaccarella
1965	United Kingdom	Jim Clark	United Kingdom	Graham Hill*	United States	Masten Gregory (Note: Official records do not list Ed Hugus, an NART reserve driver, as an official winner of the 1965 race. Accounts differ as to whether he relieved Masten Gregory and drove a short stint early on 20 June.)
1965	United Kingdom	Jim Clark	United Kingdom	Graham Hill*	Austria	Jochen Rindt
1966	United Kingdom	Graham Hill*	United Kingdom	Jackie Stewart	New Zealand	Chris Amon (Note: Although Ford decided to stage a photo finish, the Automobile Club de l'Ouest declared Amon and McLaren the 1966 winners of the 24 Hours of Le Mans since they started 20 metres (66 ft) away from their teammates Denny Hulme and Ken Miles.)
1966	United Kingdom	Graham Hill*	United Kingdom	Jackie Stewart	New Zealand	Bruce McLaren
1967	United States	A. J. Foyt	New Zealand	Denny Hulme	United States	A. J. Foyt
1967	United States	A. J. Foyt	New Zealand	Denny Hulme	United States	Dan Gurney
1968	United States	Bobby Unser	United Kingdom	Graham Hill*	Belgium	Lucien Bianchi
1968	United States	Bobby Unser	United Kingdom	Graham Hill*	Mexico	Pedro Rodríguez
1969	United States	Mario Andretti	United Kingdom	Graham Hill*	Belgium	Jacky Ickx
1969	United States	Mario Andretti	United Kingdom	Graham Hill*	United Kingdom	Jackie Oliver
1970	United States	Al Unser	Austria	Jochen Rindt	United Kingdom	Richard Attwood
1970	United States	Al Unser	Austria	Jochen Rindt	Germany	Hans Herrmann
1971	United States	Al Unser	United Kingdom	Jackie Stewart	Austria	Helmut Marko
1971	United States	Al Unser	United Kingdom	Jackie Stewart	Netherlands	Gijs van Lennep
1972	United States	Mark Donohue	France	Jean-Pierre Beltoise	United Kingdom	Graham Hill*
1972	United States	Mark Donohue	France	Jean-Pierre Beltoise	France	Henri Pescarolo
1973	United States	Gordon Johncock	United Kingdom	Jackie Stewart	France	Gérard Larrousse
1973	United States	Gordon Johncock	United Kingdom	Jackie Stewart	France	Henri Pescarolo
1974	United States	Johnny Rutherford	Sweden	Ronnie Peterson	France	Gérard Larrousse
1974	United States	Johnny Rutherford	Sweden	Ronnie Peterson	France	Henri Pescarolo
1975	United States	Bobby Unser	Austria	Niki Lauda	United Kingdom	Derek Bell
1975	United States	Bobby Unser	Austria	Niki Lauda	Belgium	Jacky Ickx
1976	United States	Johnny Rutherford	Austria	Niki Lauda	Belgium	Jacky Ickx
1976	United States	Johnny Rutherford	Austria	Niki Lauda	Netherlands	Gijs van Lennep
1977	United States	A. J. Foyt	South Africa	Jody Scheckter	Germany	Jürgen Barth
1977	United States	A. J. Foyt	South Africa	Jody Scheckter	United States	Hurley Haywood
1977	United States	A. J. Foyt	South Africa	Jody Scheckter	Belgium	Jacky Ickx
1978	United States	Al Unser	France	Patrick Depailler	France	Jean-Pierre Jaussaud
1978	United States	Al Unser	France	Patrick Depailler	France	Didier Pironi
1979	United States	Rick Mears	South Africa	Jody Scheckter	Germany	Klaus Ludwig
1979	United States	Rick Mears	South Africa	Jody Scheckter	United States	Bill Whittington
1979	United States	Rick Mears	South Africa	Jody Scheckter	United States	Don Whittington
1980	United States	Johnny Rutherford	Argentina	Carlos Reutemann	France	Jean-Pierre Jaussaud
1980	United States	Johnny Rutherford	Argentina	Carlos Reutemann	France	Jean Rondeau
1981	United States	Bobby Unser	Canada	Gilles Villeneuve	United Kingdom	Derek Bell
1981	United States	Bobby Unser	Canada	Gilles Villeneuve	Belgium	Jacky Ickx
1982	United States	Gordon Johncock	Italy	Riccardo Patrese	United Kingdom	Derek Bell
1982	United States	Gordon Johncock	Italy	Riccardo Patrese	Belgium	Jacky Ickx
1983	United States	Tom Sneva	Finland	Keke Rosberg	United States	Hurley Haywood
1983	United States	Tom Sneva	Finland	Keke Rosberg	United States	Al Holbert
1983	United States	Tom Sneva	Finland	Keke Rosberg	Australia	Vern Schuppan
1984	United States	Rick Mears	France	Alain Prost	Germany	Klaus Ludwig
1984	United States	Rick Mears	France	Alain Prost	France	Henri Pescarolo
1985	United States	Danny Sullivan	France	Alain Prost	Italy	Paolo Barilla
1985	United States	Danny Sullivan	France	Alain Prost	Germany	Klaus Ludwig
1985	United States	Danny Sullivan	France	Alain Prost	Germany	"John Winter" (Note: John Winter was the pseudonym of gentleman driver Louis Krages.)
1986	United States	Bobby Rahal	France	Alain Prost	United Kingdom	Derek Bell
1986	United States	Bobby Rahal	France	Alain Prost	United States	Al Holbert
1986	United States	Bobby Rahal	France	Alain Prost	Germany	Hans-Joachim Stuck
1987	United States	Al Unser	Brazil	Ayrton Senna	United Kingdom	Derek Bell
1987	United States	Al Unser	Brazil	Ayrton Senna	United States	Al Holbert
1987	United States	Al Unser	Brazil	Ayrton Senna	Germany	Hans-Joachim Stuck
1988	United States	Rick Mears	France	Alain Prost	United Kingdom	Johnny Dumfries
1988	United States	Rick Mears	France	Alain Prost	Netherlands	Jan Lammers
1988	United States	Rick Mears	France	Alain Prost	United Kingdom	Andy Wallace
1989	Brazil	Emerson Fittipaldi	Brazil	Ayrton Senna	Sweden	Stanley Dickens
1989	Brazil	Emerson Fittipaldi	Brazil	Ayrton Senna	Germany	Jochen Mass
1989	Brazil	Emerson Fittipaldi	Brazil	Ayrton Senna	Germany	Manuel Reuter
1990	Netherlands	Arie Luyendyk	Brazil	Ayrton Senna	United Kingdom	Martin Brundle
1990	Netherlands	Arie Luyendyk	Brazil	Ayrton Senna	United States	Price Cobb
1990	Netherlands	Arie Luyendyk	Brazil	Ayrton Senna	Denmark	John Nielsen
1991	United States	Rick Mears	Brazil	Ayrton Senna	Belgium	Bertrand Gachot
1991	United States	Rick Mears	Brazil	Ayrton Senna	United Kingdom	Johnny Herbert
1991	United States	Rick Mears	Brazil	Ayrton Senna	Germany	Volker Weidler
1992	United States	Al Unser Jr.	Brazil	Ayrton Senna	United Kingdom	Mark Blundell
1992	United States	Al Unser Jr.	Brazil	Ayrton Senna	France	Yannick Dalmas
1992	United States	Al Unser Jr.	Brazil	Ayrton Senna	United Kingdom	Derek Warwick
1993	Brazil	Emerson Fittipaldi	Brazil	Ayrton Senna	France	Christophe Bouchut
1993	Brazil	Emerson Fittipaldi	Brazil	Ayrton Senna	Australia	Geoff Brabham
1993	Brazil	Emerson Fittipaldi	Brazil	Ayrton Senna	France	Éric Hélary
1994	United States	Al Unser Jr.	Germany	Michael Schumacher	Italy	Mauro Baldi
1994	United States	Al Unser Jr.	Germany	Michael Schumacher	France	Yannick Dalmas
1994	United States	Al Unser Jr.	Germany	Michael Schumacher	United States	Hurley Haywood
1995	Canada	Jacques Villeneuve	Germany	Michael Schumacher	France	Yannick Dalmas
1995	Canada	Jacques Villeneuve	Germany	Michael Schumacher	Finland	JJ Lehto
1995	Canada	Jacques Villeneuve	Germany	Michael Schumacher	Japan	Masanori Sekiya
1996	United States	Buddy Lazier	France	Olivier Panis	United States	Davy Jones
1996	United States	Buddy Lazier	France	Olivier Panis	Germany	Manuel Reuter
1996	United States	Buddy Lazier	France	Olivier Panis	Austria	Alexander Wurz
1997	Netherlands	Arie Luyendyk	Germany	Michael Schumacher	Italy	Michele Alboreto
1997	Netherlands	Arie Luyendyk	Germany	Michael Schumacher	Sweden	Stefan Johansson
1997	Netherlands	Arie Luyendyk	Germany	Michael Schumacher	Denmark	Tom Kristensen
1998	United States	Eddie Cheever	Finland	Mika Häkkinen	France	Laurent Aïello
1998	United States	Eddie Cheever	Finland	Mika Häkkinen	United Kingdom	Allan McNish
1998	United States	Eddie Cheever	Finland	Mika Häkkinen	Monaco	Stéphane Ortelli
1999	Sweden	Kenny Bräck	Germany	Michael Schumacher	France	Yannick Dalmas
1999	Sweden	Kenny Bräck	Germany	Michael Schumacher	Italy	Pierluigi Martini
1999	Sweden	Kenny Bräck	Germany	Michael Schumacher	Germany	Joachim Winkelhock
2000	Colombia	Juan Pablo Montoya	United Kingdom	David Coulthard	Germany	Frank Biela
2000	Colombia	Juan Pablo Montoya	United Kingdom	David Coulthard	Denmark	Tom Kristensen
2000	Colombia	Juan Pablo Montoya	United Kingdom	David Coulthard	Italy	Emanuele Pirro
2001	Brazil	Hélio Castroneves	Germany	Michael Schumacher	Germany	Frank Biela
2001	Brazil	Hélio Castroneves	Germany	Michael Schumacher	Denmark	Tom Kristensen
2001	Brazil	Hélio Castroneves	Germany	Michael Schumacher	Italy	Emanuele Pirro
2002	Brazil	Hélio Castroneves	United Kingdom	David Coulthard	Germany	Frank Biela
2002	Brazil	Hélio Castroneves	United Kingdom	David Coulthard	Denmark	Tom Kristensen
2002	Brazil	Hélio Castroneves	United Kingdom	David Coulthard	Italy	Emanuele Pirro
2003	Brazil	Gil de Ferran	Colombia	Juan Pablo Montoya	Italy	Rinaldo Capello
2003	Brazil	Gil de Ferran	Colombia	Juan Pablo Montoya	Denmark	Tom Kristensen
2003	Brazil	Gil de Ferran	Colombia	Juan Pablo Montoya	United Kingdom	Guy Smith
2004	United States	Buddy Rice	Italy	Jarno Trulli	Japan	Seiji Ara
2004	United States	Buddy Rice	Italy	Jarno Trulli	Italy	Rinaldo Capello
2004	United States	Buddy Rice	Italy	Jarno Trulli	Denmark	Tom Kristensen
2005	United Kingdom	Dan Wheldon	Finland	Kimi Räikkönen	Denmark	Tom Kristensen
2005	United Kingdom	Dan Wheldon	Finland	Kimi Räikkönen	Finland	JJ Lehto
2005	United Kingdom	Dan Wheldon	Finland	Kimi Räikkönen	Germany	Marco Werner
2006	United States	Sam Hornish Jr.	Spain	Fernando Alonso	Germany	Frank Biela
2006	United States	Sam Hornish Jr.	Spain	Fernando Alonso	Italy	Emanuele Pirro
2006	United States	Sam Hornish Jr.	Spain	Fernando Alonso	Germany	Marco Werner
2007	United Kingdom	Dario Franchitti	Spain	Fernando Alonso	Germany	Frank Biela
2007	United Kingdom	Dario Franchitti	Spain	Fernando Alonso	Italy	Emanuele Pirro
2007	United Kingdom	Dario Franchitti	Spain	Fernando Alonso	Germany	Marco Werner
2008	New Zealand	Scott Dixon	United Kingdom	Lewis Hamilton	Italy	Rinaldo Capello
2008	New Zealand	Scott Dixon	United Kingdom	Lewis Hamilton	Denmark	Tom Kristensen
2008	New Zealand	Scott Dixon	United Kingdom	Lewis Hamilton	United Kingdom	Allan McNish
2009	Brazil	Hélio Castroneves	United Kingdom	Jenson Button	Australia	David Brabham
2009	Brazil	Hélio Castroneves	United Kingdom	Jenson Button	Spain	Marc Gené
2009	Brazil	Hélio Castroneves	United Kingdom	Jenson Button	Austria	Alexander Wurz
2010	United Kingdom	Dario Franchitti	Australia	Mark Webber	Germany	Timo Bernhard
2010	United Kingdom	Dario Franchitti	Australia	Mark Webber	France	Romain Dumas
2010	United Kingdom	Dario Franchitti	Australia	Mark Webber	Germany	Mike Rockenfeller
2011	United Kingdom	Dan Wheldon	Germany	Sebastian Vettel	Switzerland	Marcel Fässler
2011	United Kingdom	Dan Wheldon	Germany	Sebastian Vettel	Germany	André Lotterer
2011	United Kingdom	Dan Wheldon	Germany	Sebastian Vettel	France	Benoît Tréluyer
2012	United Kingdom	Dario Franchitti	Australia	Mark Webber	Switzerland	Marcel Fässler
2012	United Kingdom	Dario Franchitti	Australia	Mark Webber	Germany	André Lotterer
2012	United Kingdom	Dario Franchitti	Australia	Mark Webber	France	Benoît Tréluyer
2013	Brazil	Tony Kanaan	Germany	Nico Rosberg	France	Loïc Duval
2013	Brazil	Tony Kanaan	Germany	Nico Rosberg	Denmark	Tom Kristensen
2013	Brazil	Tony Kanaan	Germany	Nico Rosberg	United Kingdom	Allan McNish
2014	United States	Ryan Hunter-Reay	Germany	Nico Rosberg	Switzerland	Marcel Fässler
2014	United States	Ryan Hunter-Reay	Germany	Nico Rosberg	Germany	André Lotterer
2014	United States	Ryan Hunter-Reay	Germany	Nico Rosberg	France	Benoît Tréluyer
2015	Colombia	Juan Pablo Montoya	Germany	Nico Rosberg	New Zealand	Earl Bamber
2015	Colombia	Juan Pablo Montoya	Germany	Nico Rosberg	Germany	Nico Hülkenberg
2015	Colombia	Juan Pablo Montoya	Germany	Nico Rosberg	United Kingdom	Nick Tandy
2016	United States	Alexander Rossi	United Kingdom	Lewis Hamilton	France	Romain Dumas
2016	United States	Alexander Rossi	United Kingdom	Lewis Hamilton	Switzerland	Neel Jani
2016	United States	Alexander Rossi	United Kingdom	Lewis Hamilton	Germany	Marc Lieb
2017	Japan	Takuma Sato	Germany	Sebastian Vettel	New Zealand	Earl Bamber
2017	Japan	Takuma Sato	Germany	Sebastian Vettel	Germany	Timo Bernhard
2017	Japan	Takuma Sato	Germany	Sebastian Vettel	New Zealand	Brendon Hartley
2018	Australia	Will Power	Australia	Daniel Ricciardo	Spain	Fernando Alonso
2018	Australia	Will Power	Australia	Daniel Ricciardo	Switzerland	Sébastien Buemi
2018	Australia	Will Power	Australia	Daniel Ricciardo	Japan	Kazuki Nakajima
2019	France	Simon Pagenaud	United Kingdom	Lewis Hamilton	Spain	Fernando Alonso
2019	France	Simon Pagenaud	United Kingdom	Lewis Hamilton	Switzerland	Sébastien Buemi
2019	France	Simon Pagenaud	United Kingdom	Lewis Hamilton	Japan	Kazuki Nakajima
2020	Japan	Takuma Sato	Not held due to the COVID-19 pandemic		Switzerland	Sébastien Buemi
2020	Japan	Takuma Sato	Not held due to the COVID-19 pandemic		New Zealand	Brendon Hartley
2020	Japan	Takuma Sato	Not held due to the COVID-19 pandemic		Japan	Kazuki Nakajima
2021	Brazil	Hélio Castroneves	Netherlands	Max Verstappen	United Kingdom	Mike Conway
2021	Brazil	Hélio Castroneves	Netherlands	Max Verstappen	Japan	Kamui Kobayashi
2021	Brazil	Hélio Castroneves	Netherlands	Max Verstappen	Argentina	José María López
2022	Sweden	Marcus Ericsson	Mexico	Sergio Pérez	Switzerland	Sébastien Buemi
2022	Sweden	Marcus Ericsson	Mexico	Sergio Pérez	New Zealand	Brendon Hartley
2022	Sweden	Marcus Ericsson	Mexico	Sergio Pérez	Japan	Ryo Hirakawa
2023	United States	Josef Newgarden	Netherlands	Max Verstappen	United Kingdom	James Calado
2023	United States	Josef Newgarden	Netherlands	Max Verstappen	Italy	Antonio Giovinazzi
2023	United States	Josef Newgarden	Netherlands	Max Verstappen	Italy	Alessandro Pier Guidi
2024	United States	Josef Newgarden	Monaco	Charles Leclerc	Italy	Antonio Fuoco
2024	United States	Josef Newgarden	Monaco	Charles Leclerc	Spain	Miguel Molina
2024	United States	Josef Newgarden	Monaco	Charles Leclerc	Denmark	Nicklas Nielsen
2025	Spain	Álex Palou	United Kingdom	Lando Norris	United Kingdom	Phil Hanson
2025	Spain	Álex Palou	United Kingdom	Lando Norris	Poland	Robert Kubica
2025	Spain	Álex Palou	United Kingdom	Lando Norris	China	Yifei Ye
2026	Sweden	Felix Rosenqvist	Italy	Kimi Antonelli	United Kingdom	Mike Conway
2026	Sweden	Felix Rosenqvist	Italy	Kimi Antonelli	Japan	Kamui Kobayashi
2026	Sweden	Felix Rosenqvist	Italy	Kimi Antonelli	Netherlands	Nyck de Vries

== Bibliography ==
- Higham, Peter (1995). "Monte Carlo". The Guinness Guide to International Motor Racing. London, England: Motorbooks International. pp. 425–426. ISBN 978-0-7603-0152-4 – via Internet Archive.
- Vergeer, Koen (2009). Le Mans: geïllustreerde editie [Le Mans: illustrated edition] (in Dutch). Amsterdam, Netherlands: AmstelSport. pp. 10–13, 32, 51. ISBN 978-90-482-0026-9 – via Open Library.
- O'Kane, Philip (2012). "A History of the 'Triple Crown' of Motor Racing: The Indianapolis 500, the Le Mans 24 Hours and the Monaco Grand Prix". In Hassan, David (ed.). The History of Motor Sport: A Case Study Analysis. Abingdon, Oxfordshire: Routledge. pp. 94–111. ISBN 978-0-415-67788-2 – via Open Library.
