= 1945 in motorsport =

The following is an overview of the events of 1945 in motorsport including the major racing events, motorsport venues that were opened and closed during a year, championships and non-championship events that were established and disestablished in a year, and births and deaths of racing drivers and other motorsport people.

== Births ==
Date	Month	Name	Nationality	Occupation	Note	Ref
1	January	Jacky Ickx	Belgian	Racing driver	24 Hours of Le Mans winner (1969, 1975-1977, 1981-1982). World Endurance champion (1982-1983).	
2	April	Guy Fréquelin	French	Rally driver	1981 Rally Argentina winner.	
13	April	Raffaele Pinto	Italian	Rally driver	1974 Rally Portugal winner.	
19	June	"Flash Gordon" Mineo	American	Drag racer		
26	July	Antonio Fassina	Italian	Rally driver	1979 Rallye Sanremo winner.	
12	September	Russell "Jungle Jim" Liberman		Drag racer		
16	September	Pentti Airikkala	Finnish	Rally driver	1989 Lombard RAC Rally winner.	
16	September	Kyösti Hämäläinen	Finnish	Rally driver	1977 Rally Finland winner.	
