= 1941 in motorsport =

The following is an overview of the events of 1941 in motorsport including the major racing events, motorsport venues that were opened and closed during a year, championships and non-championship events that were established and disestablished in a year, and births and deaths of racing drivers and other motorsport people.

== Annual events ==
The calendar includes only annual major non-championship events or annual events that had own significance separate from the championship. For the dates of the championship events see related season articles.

Date	Event	Ref
30 May	29th Indianapolis 500	

== Births ==
Date	Month	Name	Nationality	Occupation	Note	Ref
31	October	Derek Bell	British	Racing driver	24 Hours of Le Mans winner (1975, 1981-1982, 1986-1987). World Endurance champion (1985-1986).	

== See also ==
- List of 1941 motorsport champions
