= 2006 in motorsport =

The following is an overview of the events of 2006 in motorsport including the major racing events, motorsport venues that were opened and closed during a year, championships and non-championship events that were established and disestablished in a year, and births and deaths of racing drivers and other motorsport people.

== Annual events ==
The calendar includes only annual major non-championship events or annual events that had significance separate from the championship. For the dates of the championship events see related season articles.

Date	Event	Ref
31 December-15 January	28th Dakar Rally	
28–29 January	44th 24 Hours of Daytona	
19 February	48th Daytona 500	
28 May	64th Monaco Grand Prix	
28 May	90th Indianapolis 500	
27 May-9 June	88th Isle of Man TT	
17–18 June	74th 24 Hours of Le Mans	
17–18 June	34th 24 Hours of Nurburgring	
29–30 July	58th 24 Hours of Spa	
30 July	29th Suzuka 8 Hours	
6 August	16th Masters of Formula 3	
8 October	49th Supercheap Auto Bathurst 1000	
19 November	53rd Macau Grand Prix	
16 December	19th Race of Champions	

== Disestablished championships/events ==
Last race	Championship	Ref
13 August	Grand Prix Masters	

== Deaths ==
Date	Month	Name	Age	Nationality	Occupation	Note	Ref
28	May	Umberto Masetti	80	Italian	Motorcycle racer	500cc Grand Prix motorcycle racing World champion (1950, 1952).	
3	September	"Flash Gordon" Mineo	61	American	Drag racer		
12	October	Eugène Martin	91	French	Racing driver	One of the first French Formula One drivers.	

== See also ==
- List of 2006 motorsport champions
