= 1940 in motorsport =

The following is an overview of the events of 1940 in motorsport including the major racing events, motorsport venues that were opened and closed during a year, championships and non-championship events that were established and disestablished in a year, and births and deaths of racing drivers and other motorsport people.

== Annual events ==
The calendar includes only annual major non-championship events or annual events that had own significance separate from the championship. For the dates of the championship events see related season articles.

| Date | Event | Ref |
|---|---|---|
| 28 April | 13th Mille Miglia | |
| 23 May | 31st Targa Florio | |
| 30 May | 28th Indianapolis 500 | |

== Births ==
| Date | Month | Name | Nationality | Occupation | Note | Ref |
|---|---|---|---|---|---|---|
| 18 | January | Pedro Rodríguez | Mexican | Racing driver | Winner of the 24 Hours of Le Mans (1968). | |
| 21 | February | Peter Gethin | British | Racing driver | 1971 Italian Grand Prix winner. | |
| 28 | February | Mario Andretti | American | Racing driver | Formula One World Champion (1978), 1969 Indianapolis 500 winner. | |
| 27 | March | Sandro Munari | Italian | Rally driver | World Rally champion (1977). | |
| 2 | April | Mike Hailwood | British | Motorcycle racer | 500cc Grand Prix motorcycle racing World champion (1962-1965). | |
| 4 | April | Richard Attwood | British | Racing driver | 24 Hours of Le Mans winner (1970). | |
| 23 | May | Gérard Larrousse | French | Racing driver | 24 Hours of Le Mans winner (1973-1974). | |
| 10 | June | Peter Ryan | Canadian | Racing driver | The first Canadian Formula One driver. | |

== Deaths ==
| Date | Month | Name | Age | Nationality | Occupation | Note | Ref |
|---|---|---|---|---|---|---|---|
| 12 | October | Luis Fontés | 27 | British | Racing driver | 24 Hours of Le Mans winner (1935). | |

== See also ==
- List of 1940 motorsport champions
