= 1972 in motorsport =

The following is an overview of the events of 1972 in motorsport including the major racing events, motorsport venues that were opened and closed during a year, championships and non-championship events that were established and disestablished in a year, and births and deaths of racing drivers and other motorsport people.

== Annual events ==
The calendar includes only annual major non-championship events or annual events that had significance separate from the championship. For the dates of the championship events see related season articles.

Date	Event	Ref
6 February	6 Hours of Daytona	
20 February	14th Daytona 500	
6 May	56th Targa Florio	
14 May	30th Monaco Grand Prix	
27 May	56th Indianapolis 500	
5–9 June	54th Isle of Man TT	
10–11 June	40th 24 Hours of Le Mans	
24–25 June	3rd 24 Hours of Nurburgring	
22–23 July	24th 24 Hours of Spa	
1 October	13th Hardie-Ferodo 500	
26 November	19th Macau Grand Prix	

== Births ==
Date	Month	Name	Nationality	Occupation	Note	Ref
12	January	Toto Wolff	Austrian	Racing driver and executive	Head of Mercedes AMG Petronas	
20	March	Pedro Lamy	Portuguese	Racing driver	1992 Masters of Formula 3 winner.	
5	April	Tom Coronel	Dutch	Racing driver	1999 Formula Nippon champion, 1997 Masters of Formula 3 winner.	
23	May	Rubens Barrichello	Brazilian	Racing driver	Winner of the 11 Formula One Grand Prix, GPDA chairman (2010–2012).	
11	July	Steven Richards	New Zealander	Racing driver	Winner of the Bathurst 1000 in 1998-1999, 2013 and 2015.	
15	October	Carlos Checa	Spanish	Motorcycle racer	Superbike World champion (2011).	

== Deaths ==
Date	Month	Name	Age	Nationality	Occupation	Note	Ref
11	June	Jo Bonnier	42	Swedish	Racing driver	The first Swedish Formula One driver. 1959 Dutch Grand Prix winner.	

== See also ==
- List of 1972 motorsport champions
