= 2004 in motorsport =

The following is an overview of the events of 2004 in motorsport including the major racing events, motorsport venues that were opened and closed during a year, championships and non-championship events that were established and disestablished in a year, and births and deaths of racing drivers and other motorsport people.

== Annual events ==
The calendar includes only annual major non-championship events or annual events that had significance separate from the championship. For the dates of the championship events see related season articles.

Date	Event	Ref
1–18 January	26th Dakar Rally	
31 January-1 February	42nd 24 Hours of Daytona	
15 February	46th Daytona 500	
23 May	62nd Monaco Grand Prix	
30 May	88th Indianapolis 500	
29 May-11 June	86th Isle of Man TT	
12–13 June	72nd 24 Hours of Le Mans	
12–13 June	32nd 24 Hours of Nurburgring	
25 July	27th Suzuka 8 Hours	
31 July-1 August	56th 24 Hours of Spa	
8 August	14th Masters of Formula 3	
10 October	46th Bob Jane T-Marts 1000	
21 November	51st Macau Grand Prix	
4 December	17th Race of Champions	

== Disestablished championships/events ==
First race	Championship	Ref
11 September	International Formula 3000 Championship	

== Deaths ==
Date	Month	Name	Age	Nationality	Occupation	Note	Ref
5	July	Rodger Ward	83	American	Racing driver	Winner of the Indianapolis 500 (1959, 1962)	

== See also ==
- List of 2004 motorsport champions
