= 1944 in motorsport =

The following is an overview of the events of 1944 in motorsport including the major racing events, motorsport venues that were opened and closed during a year, championships and non-championship events that were established and disestablished in a year, and births and deaths of racing drivers and other motorsport people.

== Births ==
Date	Month	Name	Nationality	Occupation	Note	Ref
25	February	François Cevert	French	Racing driver	1971 United States Grand Prix winner.	
30	August	Lee Shepherd	American	Drag racer		
6	October	José Carlos Pace	Brazilian	Racing driver	1975 Brazilian Grand Prix winner.	

== Deaths ==
Date	Month	Name	Age	Nationality	Occupation	Note	Ref
9	September	Robert Benoist	49	French	Racing driver	24 Hours of Le Mans winner (1937).	
13	October	Jean Trémoulet	35	French	Racing driver	24 Hours of Le Mans winner (1938).	
