= 1943 in motorsport =

The following is an overview of the events of 1943 in motorsport including the major racing events, motorsport venues that were opened and closed during a year, championships and non-championship events that were established and disestablished in a year, and births and deaths of racing drivers and other motorsport people.

== Births ==
Date	Month	Name	Nationality	Occupation	Note	Ref
19	March	Vern Schuppan	Australian	Racing driver	24 Hours of Le Mans winner (1983).	
27	April	Helmut Marko	Austrian	Racing driver	24 Hours of Le Mans winner (1971).	
20	July	Chris Amon	New Zealander	Racing driver	Winner of the 24 Hours of Le Mans (1966).	
5	August	Leo Kinnunen	Finnish	Racing driver	The first Finnish Formula One driver.	
23	September	Anders Kulläng	Swedish	Rally driver	1980 Swedish Rally winner.	
12	November	Björn Waldegård	Swedish	Rally driver	World Rally champion (1979).	
