= 2001 in motorsport =

The following is an overview of the events of 2001 in motorsport including the major racing events, motorsport venues that were opened and closed during a year, championships and non-championship events that were established and disestablished in a year, and births and deaths of racing drivers and other motorsport people.

== Annual events ==
The calendar includes only annual major non-championship events or annual events that had significance separate from the championship. For the dates of the championship events see related season articles.

Date	Event	Ref
1–21 January	23rd Dakar Rally	
3–4 February	39th 24 Hours of Daytona	
18 February	43rd Daytona 500	
26–27 May	29th 24 Hours of Nurburgring	
27 May	59th Monaco Grand Prix	
27 May	85th Indianapolis 500	
16–17 June	69th 24 Hours of Le Mans	
4–5 August	53rd 24 Hours of Spa	
5 August	24th Suzuka 8 Hours	
5 August	11th Masters of Formula 3	
7 October	44th V8 Supercar 1000	
18 November	48th Macau Grand Prix	
8–9 December	14th Race of Champions	

== Deaths ==
Date	Month	Name	Age	Nationality	Occupation	Note	Ref
11	January	Louis Krages	51	German	Racing driver	24 Hours of Le Mans winner (1985).	
18	February	Dale Earnhardt	49	American	Racing Driver	1998 Daytona 500 Winner, Seven-Time NASCAR Winston Cup Series Champion	
10	March	Jorge Recalde	49	Argentine	Rally driver	1988 Rally Argentina winner.	
16	March	Bob Wollek	57	French	Racing driver	24 Hours of Daytona winner (1983, 1985, 1989, 1991)	
25	April	Michele Alboreto	44	Italian	Racing driver	24 Hours of Le Mans winner (1997).	
26	May	Vittorio Brambilla	63	Italian	Racing driver	1975 Austrian Grand Prix winner.	

== See also ==
- List of 2001 motorsport champions
