= 1956 in motorsport =

The following is an overview of the events of 1956 in motorsport including the major racing events, motorsport venues that were opened and closed during a year, championships and non-championship events that were established and disestablished in a year, and births and deaths of racing drivers and other motorsport people.

== Annual events ==
The calendar includes only annual major non-championship events or annual events that had own significance separate from the championship. For the dates of the championship events see related season articles.

Date	Event	Ref
29–30 April	23rd Mille Miglia	
13 May	14th Monaco Grand Prix	
30 May	40th Indianapolis 500	
4–14 June	38th Isle of Man TT	
10 June	40th Targa Florio	
28–29 July	24th 24 Hours of Le Mans	
4 November	3rd Macau Grand Prix	

== Births ==
Date	Month	Name	Nationality	Occupation	Note	Ref
7	February	John Nielsen	Danish	Racing driver	24 Hours of Le Mans winner (1990).	
2	June	Jan Lammers	Dutch	Racing driver	24 Hours of Le Mans winner (1988). FIA Sportscar champion (2002-2003).	
8	June	Péter Besenyei	Hungarian	Air racer	Red Bull Air World Race champion (2003).	
17	August	Nigel Lamb	British	Air racer	Red Bull Air World Race champion (2014).	
8	September	Stefan Johansson	Swedish	Racing driver	24 Hours of Le Mans winner (1997).	
23	December	Michele Alboreto	Italian	Racing driver	24 Hours of Le Mans winner (1997).	

== Deaths ==
Date	Month	Name	Age	Nationality	Occupation	Note	Ref
3	February	Johnny Claes	39	Belgian	Racing driver	The first Belgian Formula One driver.	
31	March	Ralph DePalma	73	Italian-American	Racing driver	Indianapolis 500 winner (1915).	
17	June	Bob Sweikert	30	American	Racing driver	Winner of the Indianapolis 500 (1955)	
29	October	Louis Rosier	50	French	Racing driver	Winner of the 24 Hours of Le Mans (1950)	

== See also ==
- List of 1956 motorsport champions
