= 1955 in motorsport =

The following is an overview of the events of 1955 in motorsport including the major racing events, motorsport venues that were opened and closed during a year, championships and non-championship events that were established and disestablished in a year, and births and deaths of racing drivers and other motorsport people.

== Annual events ==
The calendar includes only annual major non-championship events or annual events that had own significance separate from the championship. For the dates of the championship events see related season articles.

Date	Event	Ref
1–2 May	22nd Mille Miglia	
22 May	13th Monaco Grand Prix	
30 May	39th Indianapolis 500	
4–10 June	37th Isle of Man TT	
11–12 June	23rd 24 Hours of Le Mans	
16 October	39th Targa Florio	
6 November	2nd Macau Grand Prix	

== Births ==
Date	Month	Name	Nationality	Occupation	Note	Ref
18	January	Patrick Tauziac	French	Rally driver	1990 Rallye Côte d'Ivoire winner.	
24	February	Alain Prost	French	Racing driver	Formula One World Champion (1985-1986, 1989, 1993).	
9	March	Franco Uncini	Italian	Motorcycle racer	500cc Grand Prix motorcycle racing World champion (1982).	
10	October	Mike Mangold	American	Air racer	Red Bull Air World Race champion (2005, 2007).	

== Deaths ==
Date	Month	Name	Age	Nationality	Occupation	Note	Ref
26	May	Alberto Ascari	36	Italian	Racing driver	Formula One World Champion (1952, 1953).	
30	May	Bill Vukovich	36	American	Racing driver	Winner of the Indianapolis 500 (1952, 1953). Died during 1955 Indianapolis 500.	
11	June	Pierre Levegh	49	French	Racing driver	Died during 1955 24 Hours of Le Mans.	

== See also ==
- List of 1955 motorsport champions
