= 1917 in motorsport =

The following is an overview of the events of 1917 in motorsport including the major racing events, motorsport venues that were opened and closed during a year, championships and non-championship events that were established and disestablished in a year, and births and deaths of racing drivers and other motorsport people.

== Births ==
| Date | Month | Name | Nationality | Occupation | Note | Ref |
|---|---|---|---|---|---|---|
| 30 | January | Paul Frère | Belgian | Racing driver | 24 Hours of Le Mans winner (1960). | |
| 26 | February | Robert La Caze | Moroccan | Racing driver | The first Moroccan Formula One driver. | |
| 30 | October | Maurice Trintignant | French | Racing driver | 24 Hours of Le Mans winner (1954). | |
| 29 | December | David Hampshire | British | Racing driver | One of the first British Formula One drivers. | |
