= 1952 in motorsport =

The following is an overview of the events of 1952 in motorsport including the major racing events, motorsport venues that were opened and closed during a year, championships and non-championship events that were established and disestablished in a year, and births and deaths of racing drivers and other motorsport people.

== Annual events ==
The calendar includes only annual major non-championship events or annual events that had own significance separate from the championship. For the dates of the championship events see related season articles.

| Date | Event | Ref |
|---|---|---|
| 4–5 May | 19th Mille Miglia | |
| 30 May | 36th Indianapolis 500 | |
| 2 June | 12h Monaco Grand Prix | |
| 9–13 June | 34th Isle of Man TT | |
| 14–15 June | 20th 24 Hours of Le Mans | |
| 29 June | 36th Targa Florio | |

== Births ==
| Date | Month | Name | Nationality | Occupation | Note | Ref |
|---|---|---|---|---|---|---|
| 20 | March | Geoff Brabham | Australian | Racing driver | 24 Hours of Le Mans winner (1993). | |
| 26 | March | Didier Pironi | French | Racing driver | 24 Hours of Le Mans winner (1978). | |
| 7 | April | Stanley Dickens | Swedish | Racing driver | 24 Hours of Le Mans winner (1989). | |
| 27 | April | Ari Vatanen | Finnish | Rally driver | World Rally champion (1981). | |
| 17 | August | Nelson Piquet | Brazilian | Racing driver | Formula One World Champion (1981, 1983, 1987). | |

== Deaths ==
| Date | Month | Name | Age | Nationality | Occupation | Note | Ref |
|---|---|---|---|---|---|---|---|
| 20 | June | Luigi Fagioli | 54 | Italian | Racing driver | 1951 French Grand Prix winner | |

== See also ==
- List of 1952 motorsport champions
