= 1942 in motorsport =

The following is an overview of the events of 1942 in motorsport including the major racing events, motorsport venues that were opened and closed during a year, championships and non-championship events that were established and disestablished in a year, and births and deaths of racing drivers and other motorsport people.

== Births ==
| Date | Month | Name | Nationality | Occupation | Note | Ref |
|---|---|---|---|---|---|---|
| 14 | February | Ricardo Rodríguez | Mexican | Racing driver | The first Mexican Formula One driver. | |
| 16 | March | Gijs van Lennep | Dutch | Racing driver | 24 Hours of Le Mans winner (1971, 1976). | |
| 18 | April | Jochen Rindt | Austrian | Racing driver | The only posthumous Formula One World Champion. Winner of the 24 Hours of Le Mans (1965) | |
| 24 | May | Hannu Mikkola | Finnish | Rally driver | World Rally champion (1983). | |
| 16 | June | Giacomo Agostini | Italian | Motorcycle racer | 500cc Grand Prix motorcycle racing World champion (1966-1972, 1975). | |
| 14 | August | Jackie Oliver | British | Racing driver | 24 Hours of Le Mans winner (1969) | |
| 27 | August | Tom Belsø | Danish | Racing driver | The first Danish Formula One driver. | |
| 25 | September | Henri Pescarolo | French | Racing driver | 24 Hours of Le Mans winner (1972-1974, 1984). | |

== Deaths ==
| Date | Month | Name | Age | Nationality | Occupation | Note | Ref |
|---|---|---|---|---|---|---|---|
| 22 | September 1942 | Louis Schneider | 40 | American | Racing driver | Indianapolis 500 winner (1931). | |
