= 1947 in motorsport =

The following is an overview of the events of 1947 in motorsport including the major racing events, motorsport venues that were opened and closed during a year, championships and non-championship events that were established and disestablished in a year, and births and deaths of racing drivers and other motorsport people.

== Annual events ==
The calendar includes only annual major non-championship events or annual events that had own significance separate from the championship. For the dates of the championship events see related season articles.

Date	Event	Ref
30 May	31st Indianapolis 500	
9–13 June	29th Isle of Man TT	
21–22 June	14th Mille Miglia	

== Births ==
Date	Month	Name	Nationality	Occupation	Note	Ref
7	March	Walter Röhrl	German	Rally driver	World Rally champion (1980, 1982).	
29	August	James Hunt	British	Racing driver	Formula One World Champion (1976).	
24	September	Bernard Béguin	French	Rally driver	1987 Tour de Corse winner.	
14	October	Rikky von Opel	Liechtensteiner	Racing driver	The first Liechtensteiner Formula One driver.	
10	December	Jürgen Barth	German	Racing driver	24 Hours of Le Mans winner (1977).	

== See also ==
- List of 1947 motorsport champions
