= 2014 in motorsport =

The following is an overview of the events of 2014 in motorsport including the major racing events, motorsport venues that were opened and closed during a year, championships and non-championship events that were established and disestablished in a year, and births and deaths of racing drivers and other motorsport people.

== Annual events ==
The calendar includes only annual major non-championship events or annual events that had significance separate from the championship. For the dates of the championship events see related season articles.

Date	Event	Ref
5–18 January	36th Dakar Rally	
25–26 January	52nd 24 Hours of Daytona	
23 February	56th Daytona 500	
25 May	72nd Monaco Grand Prix	
25 May	98th Indianapolis 500	
24 May-6 June	96th Isle of Man TT	
14–15 June	82nd 24 Hours of Le Mans	
21–22 June	42nd 24 Hours of Nürburgring	
6 July	24th Zandvoort Masters	
26–27 July	66th 24 Hours of Spa	
27 July	37th Suzuka 8 Hours	
12 October	57th Supercheap Auto Bathurst 1000	
16 November	61st Macau Grand Prix	
13–14 December	26th Race of Champions	

== Established championships/events ==
First race	Championship	Ref
25-26 January	United SportsCar Championship	
3-4 May	FIA World Rallycross Championship	

== Disestablished championships/events ==
Last race	Championship	Ref
14 September	British Formula Three Championship	
5 October	German Formula Three Championship	

== Deaths ==
Date	Month	Name	Age	Nationality	Occupation	Note	Ref
19	May	Jack Brabham	88	Australian	Racing driver	Formula One World Champion (1959-1960, 1966).	
29	August	Björn Waldegård	70	Swedish	Rally driver	World Rally champion (1979).	

== See also ==
- List of 2014 motorsport champions
