= 1911 in motorsport =

The following is an overview of the events of 1911 in motorsport including the major racing events, motorsport venues that were opened and closed during a year, championships and non-championship events that were established and disestablished in a year, and births and deaths of racing drivers and other motorsport people.

== Annual events ==
The calendar includes only annual major non-championship events or annual events that had own significance separate from the championship. For the dates of the championship events see related season articles.

Date	Event	Ref
14 May	6th Targa Florio	
30 May	1st Indianapolis 500	
30 June-3 July	5th Isle of Man TT	

== Births ==
Date	Month	Name	Nationality	Occupation	Note	Ref
20	June	Paul Pietsch	German	Racing driver	The first German Formula One driver.	
24	June	Juan Manuel Fangio	Argentine	Racing driver	Formula One World Champion (1951, 1954-1957).	
2	July	Reg Parnell	British	Racing driver	1951 BRDC International Trophy winner.	
14	September	Leslie Graham	British	Motorcycle racer	500cc Grand Prix motorcycle racing World champion (1949).	
