= 1953 in motorsport =

The following is an overview of the events of 1953 in motorsport including the major racing events, motorsport venues that were opened and closed during a year, championships and non-championship events that were established and disestablished in a year, and births and deaths of racing drivers and other motorsport people.

== Annual events ==
The calendar includes only annual major non-championship events or annual events that had own significance separate from the championship. For the dates of the championship events see related season articles.

| Date | Event | Ref |
|---|---|---|
| 25–26 April | 20th Mille Miglia | |
| 14 May | 37th Targa Florio | |
| 30 May | 37th Indianapolis 500 | |
| 8–12 June | 35th Isle of Man TT | |
| 13–14 June | 21st 24 Hours of Le Mans | |
| 25–26 July | 15th 24 Hours of Spa | |

== Births ==
| Date | Month | Name | Nationality | Occupation | Note | Ref |
|---|---|---|---|---|---|---|
| 10 | January | Bobby Rahal | American | Racing driver | Indianapolis 500 winner (1986). | |
| 22 | April | Alain Oreille | French | Rally driver | 1989 Rallye Côte d'Ivoire winner. | |
| 8 | August | Nigel Mansell | British | Racing driver | Formula One World Champion (1992). | |
| 21 | September | Arie Luyendyk | Dutch | Racing driver | Indianapolis 500 winner (1990, 1997). | |
| 26 | September | Sepp Haider | Austrian | Rally driver | 1988 New Zealand winner. | |

== Deaths ==
| Date | Month | Name | Age | Nationality | Occupation | Note | Ref |
|---|---|---|---|---|---|---|---|
| 12 | June | Leslie Graham | 41 | British | Motorcycle racer | 500cc Grand Prix motorcycle racing World champion (1949). | |
| 11 | August | Tazio Nuvolari | 60 | Italian | Racing driver | 24 Hours of Le Mans winner (1933). | |
| 21 | November | Felice Bonetto | 50 | Italian | Racing driver | 1952 Targa Florio winner. | |

== See also ==
- List of 1953 motorsport champions
