= 1912 in motorsport =

The following is an overview of the events of 1912 in motorsport including the major racing events, motorsport venues that were opened and closed during a year, championships and non-championship events that were established and disestablished in a year, and births and deaths of racing drivers and other motorsport people.

== Annual events ==
The calendar includes only annual major non-championship events or annual events that had own significance separate from the championship. For the dates of the championship events see related season articles.

Date	Event	Ref
25–26 May	7th Targa Florio	
30 May	2nd Indianapolis 500	
28 June-1 July	6th Isle of Man TT	

== Births ==
Date	Month	Name	Nationality	Occupation	Note	Ref
22	March	Leslie Johnson	British	Racing driver	One of the first British Formula One drivers.	
7	October	Peter Walker	British	Racing driver	24 Hours of Le Mans winner (1951)	
26	December	Luis Fontés	British	Racing driver	24 Hours of Le Mans winner (1936).	
