= 2007 in motorsport =

The following is an overview of the events of 2007 in motorsport including the major racing events, motorsport venues that were opened and closed during a year, championships and non-championship events that were established and disestablished in a year, and births and deaths of racing drivers and other motorsport people.

== Annual events ==
The calendar includes only annual major non-championship events or annual events that had significance separate from the championship. For the dates of the championship events see related season articles.

Date	Event	Ref
6–21 January	29th Dakar Rally	
27–28 January	45th 24 Hours of Daytona	
18 February	49th Daytona 500	
27 May	65th Monaco Grand Prix	
27 May	91st Indianapolis 500	
26 May-8 June	89th Isle of Man TT	
9–10 June	35th 24 Hours of Nurburgring	
16–17 June	75th 24 Hours of Le Mans	
28–29 July	59th 24 Hours of Spa	
29 July	30th Suzuka 8 Hours	
5 August	17th Masters of Formula 3	
7 October	50th Supercheap Auto Bathurst 1000	
18 November	54th Macau Grand Prix	
16 December	20th Race of Champions	

== Disestablished championships/events ==
Last race	Championship	Ref
25 November	Formula Toyota	

== Deaths ==
Date	Month	Name	Age	Nationality	Occupation	Note	Ref
22	January	Toulo de Graffenried	92	Swiss	Racing driver	The first Swiss Formula One driver.	
15	September	Colin McRae	39	British	Rally driver	World Rally champion (1995).	

== See also ==
- List of 2007 motorsport champions
