= 1934 in motorsport =

The following is an overview of the events of 1934 in motorsport including the major racing events, motorsport venues that were opened and closed during a year, championships and non-championship events that were established and disestablished in a year, and births and deaths of racing drivers and other motorsport people.

== Annual events ==
The calendar includes only annual major non-championship events or annual events that had own significance separate from the championship. For the dates of the championship events see related season articles.

Date	Event	Ref
2 April	6th Monaco Grand Prix	
8–9 April	8th Mille Miglia	
20 May	25th Targa Florio	
30 May	22nd Indianapolis 500	
11–15 June	23rd Isle of Man TT	
16–17 June	12th 24 Hours of Le Mans	
8 July	10 Hours of Spa	

== Births ==
Date	Month	Name	Nationality	Occupation	Note	Ref
11	February	John Surtees	British	Racing driver	Grand Prix motorcycle racing champion (1956, 1958, 1959, 1960). Formula One World Champion (1964).	
20	February	Bobby Unser	American	Racing driver	Indianapolis 500 winner (1968, 1975, 1981).	
10	November	Lucien Bianchi	Belgian	Racing driver	24 Hours of Le Mans winner (1968).	
25	December	Giancarlo Baghetti	Italian	Racing driver	1961 French Grand Prix winner.	

== See also ==
- List of 1934 motorsport champions
