= 1996 in motorsport =

The following is an overview of the events of 1996 in motorsport including the major racing events, motorsport venues that were opened and closed during a year, championships and non-championship events that were established and disestablished in a year, and births and deaths of racing drivers and other motorsport people.

== Annual events ==
The calendar includes only annual major non-championship events or annual events that had significance separate from the championship. For the dates of the championship events see related season articles.

Date	Event	Ref
30 December-14 January	18th Dakar Rally	
3–4 February	34th 24 Hours of Daytona	
18 February	38th Daytona 500	
19 May	54th Monaco Grand Prix	
26 May	80th Indianapolis 500	
27 May-10 June	79th Isle of Man TT	
15–16 June	64th 24 Hours of Le Mans	
15–16 June	24th 24 Hours of Nurburgring	
27–28 July	48th 24 Hours of Spa	
28 July	19th Suzuka 8 Hours	
4 August	6th Masters of Formula 3	
6 October	37th AMP Bathurst 1000	
17 November	43rd Macau Grand Prix	
7–8 December	9th Race of Champions	

== See also ==
- List of 1996 motorsport champions
