= 1918 in motorsport =

The following is an overview of the events of 1918 in motorsport including the major racing events, motorsport venues that were opened and closed during a year, championships and non-championship events that were established and disestablished in a year, and births and deaths of racing drivers and other motorsport people.

== Births ==
| Date | Month | Name | Nationality | Occupation | Note | Ref |
|---|---|---|---|---|---|---|
| 4 | July | Johnnie Parsons | American | Racing driver | Winner of the Indianapolis 500 (1950) | |
| 13 | July | Alberto Ascari | Italian | Racing driver | Formula One World Champion (1952, 1953). | |
| 16 | October | Tony Rolt | British | Racing driver | 24 Hours of Le Mans winner (1953). | |
| 13 | December | Bill Vukovich | American | Racing driver | Winner of the Indianapolis 500 (1953, 1954). | |
