= 1951 in motorsport =

The following is an overview of the events of 1951 in motorsport including the major racing events, motorsport venues that were opened and closed during a year, championships and non-championship events that were established and disestablished in a year, and births and deaths of racing drivers and other motorsport people.

== Annual events ==
The calendar includes only annual major non-championship events or annual events that had own significance separate from the championship. For the dates of the championship events see related season articles.

Date	Event	Ref
28–29 April	18th Mille Miglia	
30 May	35th Indianapolis 500	
6–8 June	33rd Isle of Man TT	
23–24 June	19th 24 Hours of Le Mans	
9 September	35th Targa Florio	

== Births ==
Date	Month	Name	Nationality	Occupation	Note	Ref
1	January	Hans-Joachim Stuck	German	Racing driver	24 Hours of Le Mans winner (1986, 1987). World Endurance champion (1985).	
22	January	Fulvio Bacchelli	Italian	Rally driver	1977 Rally New Zealand winner.	
15	February	Markku Alén	Finnish	Rally driver	World Rally champion (1978).	
15	June	Alain Ambrosino	French	Rally driver	1988 Rallye Côte d'Ivoire winner.	
7	August	Jorge Recalde	Argentine	Rally driver	1988 Rally Argentina winner.	
8	October	Timo Salonen	Finnish	Rally driver	World Rally champion (1985).	
3	December	Rick Mears	American	Racing driver	Indianapolis 500 winner (1979, 1984, 1988, 1991).	
14	December	Joaquim Moutinho	Portuguese	Rally driver	1986 Rally de Portugal winner.	
31	December	Kenny Roberts	American	Motorcycle racer	500cc Grand Prix motorcycle racing World champion (1978-1980).	

== See also ==
- List of 1951 motorsport champions
