= 1937 in motorsport =

The following is an overview of the events of 1937 in motorsport, including major racing events, motorsport venues that were opened and closed during the year, championships and non-championship events that were established and disestablished, as well as the births and deaths of racing drivers and other motorsport figures.

== Annual events ==
The calendar includes only major non-championship events or annual events that had significance separate from the championship. For the dates of the championship events see related season articles.

Date	Event	Ref
4–5 April	11th Mille Miglia	
23 May	28th Targa Florio	
31 May	25th Indianapolis 500	
15–18 June	26th Isle of Man TT	
19–20 June	14th 24 Hours of Le Mans	
8 August	9th Monaco Grand Prix	

== Births ==
Date	Month	Name	Nationality	Occupation	Note	Ref
14	January	Tom "Mongo$e" McEwen	American	drag racer		
9	February	Tony Maggs	South African	Racing driver	The first South African Formula One driver.	
18	March	Mark Donohue	American	Racing driver	Indianapolis 500 winner (1972).	
26	April	Jean-Pierre Beltoise	French	Racing driver	1972 Monaco Grand Prix winner.	
3	June	Jean-Pierre Jaussaud	French	Racing driver	24 Hours of Le Mans winner (1978, 1980).	
30	August	Bruce McLaren	New Zealander	Racing driver	Founder of the McLaren. Winner of the 24 Hours of Le Mans (1966)	
30	September	Gary Hocking	Rhodesian	Motorcycle racer	500cc Grand Prix motorcycle racing World champion (1961).	
11	November	Vittorio Brambilla	Italian	Racing driver	1975 Austrian Grand Prix winner.	

== See also ==
- List of 1937 motorsport champions
