= 1925 in motorsport =

The following is an overview of the events of 1925 in motorsport including the major racing events, motorsport venues that were opened and closed during a year, championships and non-championship events that were established and disestablished in a year, and births and deaths of racing drivers and other motorsport people.

== Annual events ==
The calendar includes only annual major non-championship events or annual events that had own significance separate from the championship. For the dates of the championship events see related season articles.

Date	Event	Ref
3 May	16th Targa Florio	
30 May	12th Indianapolis 500	
20–21 June	3rd 24 Hours of Le Mans	
18–22 June	14th Isle of Man TT	
11–12 July	2nd 24 Hours of Spa	

== Births ==
Date	Month	Name	Nationality	Occupation	Note	Ref
14	May	Ninian Sanderson	British	Racing driver	24 Hours of Le Mans winner (1956).	
14	June	Jean-Louis Rosier	French	Racing driver	Winner of the 24 Hours of Le Mans (1950)	

== See also ==
- List of 1925 motorsport champions
