= 2012 in motorsport =

The following is an overview of the events of 2012 in motorsport including the major racing events, motorsport venues that were opened and closed during a year, championships and non-championship events that were established and disestablished in a year, and births and deaths of racing drivers and other motorsport people.

== Annual events ==
The calendar includes only annual major non-championship events or annual events that had significance separate from the championship. For the dates of the championship events see related season articles.

Date	Event	Ref
1–15 January	34th Dakar Rally	
28–29 January	50th 24 Hours of Daytona	
27–28 February	54th Daytona 500	
19–20 May	40th 24 Hours of Nurburgring	
27 May	70th Monaco Grand Prix	
27 May	96th Indianapolis 500	
26 May-9 June	94th Isle of Man TT	
16–17 June	80th 24 Hours of Le Mans	
15 July	22nd Masters of Formula 3	
28–29 July	64th 24 Hours of Spa	
29 July	35th Suzuka 8 Hours	
7 October	55th Supercheap Auto Bathurst 1000	
18 November	59th Macau Grand Prix	
15–16 December	25th Race of Champions	

== Disestablished championships/events ==
Last race	Championship	Ref
30 September	FIA Formula Two Championship	

== Deaths ==
Date	Month	Name	Age	Nationality	Occupation	Note	Ref
28	February	Anders Kulläng	68	Swedish	Rally driver	1980 Swedish Rally winner.	
29	March	Bill "Grumpy" Jenkins	81	American	Drag racer		
10	May	Carroll Shelby	89	American	Automotive designer and racing driver	24 Hours of Le Mans winner (1959).	
31	May	Paul Pietsch	100	German	Racing driver	The first German Formula One driver.	
3	June	Roy Salvadori	90	British	Racing driver	24 Hours of Le Mans winner (1959).	

== See also ==
- List of 2012 motorsport champions
