= 1961 in motorsport =

The following is an overview of the events of 1961 in motorsport including the major racing events, motorsport venues that were opened and closed during a year, championships and non-championship events that were established and disestablished in a year, and births and deaths of racing drivers and other motorsport people.

== Annual events ==
The calendar includes only annual major non-championship events or annual events that had own significance separate from the championship. For the dates of the championship events see related season articles.

Date	Event	Ref
26 February	3rd Daytona 500	
30 April	45th Targa Florio	
14 May	19th Monaco Grand Prix	
30 May	45th Indianapolis 500	
10–11 June	29th 24 Hours of Le Mans	
12–16 June	43rd Isle of Man TT	
19 November	2nd Armstrong 500	
19 November	8th Macau Grand Prix	

== Births ==
Date	Month	Name	Nationality	Occupation	Note	Ref
19	February	Andy Wallace	British	Racing driver	24 Hours of Le Mans winner (1988).	
20	April	Paolo Barilla	Italian	Racing driver	24 Hours of Le Mans winner (1985).	
23	April	Pierluigi Martini	Italian	Racing driver	24 Hours of Le Mans winner (1999).	
23	June	Ian Duncan	Kenyan	Rally driver	1994 Safari Rally winner.	
28	July	Yannick Dalmas	French	Racing driver	24 Hours of Le Mans winner (1992, 1994-1995, 1999). World Endurance champion (1992).	
6	December	Manuel Reuter	German	Racing driver	24 Hours of Le Mans winner (1989, 1996).	
20	December	Freddie Spencer	American	Motorcycle racer	500cc Grand Prix motorcycle racing World champion (1983, 1985).	

== See also ==
- List of 1961 motorsport champions
