= 1948 in motorsport =

The following is an overview of the events of 1948 in motorsport including the major racing events, motorsport venues that were opened and closed during a year, championships and non-championship events that were established and disestablished in a year, and births and deaths of racing drivers and other motorsport people.

== Annual events ==
The calendar includes only annual major non-championship events or annual events that had own significance separate from the championship. For the dates of the championship events see related season articles.

Date	Event	Ref
4 April	32nd Targa Florio	
1–2 May	15th Mille Miglia	
16 May	10th Monaco Grand Prix	
31 May	32nd Indianapolis 500	
9–13 June	30th Isle of Man TT	
10–11 July	13th 24 Hours of Spa	

== Births ==
Date	Month	Name	Nationality	Occupation	Note	Ref
4	May	Hurley Haywood	American	Racing driver	24 Hours of Le Mans winner (1977, 1983, 1994).	
1	June	Tom Sneva	American	Racing driver	Indianapolis 500 winner (1983).	
20	November	Gunnar Nilsson	Swedish	Racing driver	1977 Belgian Grand Prix winner.	
6	December	Keke Rosberg	Finnish	Racing driver	Formula One World Champion (1982).	

== Deaths ==
Date	Month	Name	Age	Nationality	Occupation	Note	Ref
27	July	Woolf Barnato	52	British	Racing driver	24 Hours of Le Mans winner (1928-1930).	

== See also ==
- List of 1948 motorsport champions
