= 1931 in motorsport =

The following is an overview of the events of 1931 in motorsport including the major racing events, motorsport venues that were opened and closed during a year, championships and non-championship events that were established and disestablished in a year, and births and deaths of racing drivers and other motorsport people.

== Annual events ==
The calendar includes only annual major non-championship events or annual events that had own significance separate from the championship. For the dates of the championship events see related season articles.

Date	Event	Ref
11–12 April	5th Mille Miglia	
19 April	3rd Monaco Grand Prix	
10 May	22nd Targa Florio	
30 May	19th Indianapolis 500	
10–14 June	20th Isle of Man TT	
13–14 June	9th 24 Hours of Le Mans	
4–5 July	8th 24 Hours of Spa	

== Births ==
Date	Month	Name	Nationality	Occupation	Note	Ref
13	April	Dan Gurney	American	Racing driver	Winner of the 24 Hours of Le Mans (1967).	

== Deaths ==
Date	Month	Name	Age	Nationality	Occupation	Note	Ref
5	May	Glen Kidston	31	British	Racing driver	24 Hours of Le Mans winner (1930).	

== See also ==
- List of 1931 motorsport champions
