= 1933 in motorsport =

The following is an overview of the events of 1933 in motorsport including the major racing events, motorsport venues that were opened and closed during a year, championships and non-championship events that were established and disestablished in a year, and births and deaths of racing drivers and other motorsport people.

== Annual events ==
The calendar includes only annual major non-championship events or annual events that had own significance separate from the championship. For the dates of the championship events see related season articles.

Date	Event	Ref
8–9 April	7th Mille Miglia	
23 April	5th Monaco Grand Prix	
28 May	24th Targa Florio	
30 May	21st Indianapolis 500	
17–18 June	11th 24 Hours of Le Mans	
15–19 June	22nd Isle of Man TT	
1–2 July	10th 24 Hours of Spa	

== Births ==
Date	Month	Name	Nationality	Occupation	Note	Ref
4	March	Nino Vaccarella	Italian	Racing driver	24 Hours of Le Mans winner (1964).	
2	June	Lew "Sneaky Pete" Robinson	American	drag racer		
12	August	Parnelli Jones	American	Racing driver	Indianapolis 500 winner (1963).	
18	October	Ludovico Scarfiotti	Italian	Racing driver	1966 Italian Grand Prix winner. Winner of the 24 Hours of Le Mans (1963).	

== Deaths ==
Date	Month	Name	Age	Nationality	Occupation	Note	Ref
22	June	Tim Birkin	36	British	Racing driver	24 Hours of Le Mans winner (1929, 1931).	

== See also ==
- List of 1933 motorsport champions
