= 1983 in motorsport =

The following is an overview of the events of 1983 in motorsport including the major racing events, motorsport venues that were opened and closed during a year, championships and non-championship events that were established and disestablished in a year, and births and deaths of racing drivers and other motorsport people.

== Annual events ==
The calendar includes only annual major non-championship events or annual events that had significance separate from the championship. For the dates of the championship events see related season articles.

Date	Event	Ref
1–20 January	5th Dakar Rally	
5–6 February	21st 24 Hours of Daytona	
20 February	25th Daytona 500	
15 May	41st Monaco Grand Prix	
29 May	67th Indianapolis 500	
4–10 June	66th Isle of Man TT	
18–19 June	51st 24 Hours of Le Mans	
30–31 July	35th 24 Hours of Spa	
31 July	6th Suzuka 8 Hours	
2 October	24th James Hardie 1000	
20 November	30th Macau Grand Prix	

== Births ==
Date	Month	Name	Nationality	Occupation	Note	Ref
7	February	Christian Klien	Austrian	Racing driver	49 starts in Formula One	
26	April	José María López	Argentine	Racing driver	World Touring Car champion (2014-2016).	
2	May	Dani Sordo	Spanish	Rally driver	2013 Rallye Deutschland winner.	
17	December	Sébastien Ogier	French	Rally driver	World Rally champion (2013-2017).	

== Deaths ==
Date	Month	Name	Age	Nationality	Occupation	Note	Ref
28	December	Eugène Chaboud	76	French	Racing driver	24 Hours of Le Mans winner (1938).	

== See also ==
- List of 1983 motorsport champions
