= 1957 in motorsport =

The following is an overview of the events of 1957 in motorsport including the major racing events, motorsport venues that were opened and closed during a year, championships and non-championship events that were established and disestablished in a year, and births and deaths of racing drivers and other motorsport people.

== Annual events ==
The calendar includes only annual major non-championship events or annual events that had own significance separate from the championship. For the dates of the championship events see related season articles.

Date	Event	Ref
12–13 May	24th Mille Miglia	
19 May	14th Monaco Grand Prix	
30 May	41st Indianapolis 500	
3–7 June	39th Isle of Man TT	
22–23 June	25th 24 Hours of Le Mans	
17 November	4th Macau Grand Prix	
24 November	41st Targa Florio	

== Births ==
Date	Month	Name	Nationality	Occupation	Note	Ref
21	February	Raymond Roche	French	Motorcycle racer	Superbike World champion (1990).	
26	May	Roberto Ravaglia	Italian	Racing driver	World Touring Car champion (1987).	
11	October	Franco Cunico	Italian	Rally driver	1993 Rallye Sanremo winner.	

== Deaths ==
Date	Month	Name	Age	Nationality	Occupation	Note	Ref
20	January	Dudley Benjafield	69	British	Racing driver	24 Hours of Le Mans winner (1927). Founder of the British Racing Drivers' Club.	

== See also ==
- List of 1957 motorsport champions
