= 1975 in motorsport =

The following is an overview of the events of 1975 in motorsport including the major racing events, motorsport venues that were opened and closed during a year, championships and non-championship events that were established and disestablished in a year, and births and deaths of racing drivers and other motorsport people.

== Annual events ==
The calendar includes only annual major non-championship events or annual events that had significance separate from the championship. For the dates of the championship events see related season articles.

Date	Event	Ref
1–2 February	13th 24 Hours of Daytona	
16 February	17th Daytona 500	
11 May	33rd Monaco Grand Prix	
25 May	59th Indianapolis 500	
1–7 June	57th Isle of Man TT	
14–15 June	43rd 24 Hours of Le Mans	
20 July	59th Targa Florio	
26–27 July	27th 24 Hours of Spa	
5 October	16th Hardie-Ferodo 1000	
16 November	22nd Macau Grand Prix	

== Births ==
Date	Month	Name	Nationality	Occupation	Note	Ref
10	May	Hélio Castroneves	Brazilian	Racing driver	Indianapolis 500 winner (2001-2002, 2009).	
17	September	Jimmie Johnson	American	Racing Driver	Seven-Time NASCAR Sprint Cup Series Champion	
20	September	Juan Pablo Montoya	Colombian	Racing driver	Indianapolis 500 winner (2000, 2015).	

== Deaths ==
Date	Month	Name	Age	Nationality	Occupation	Note	Ref
19	August	Mark Donohue	38	American	Racing driver	Indianapolis 500 winner (1972).	
23	September	René Thomas	89	French	Racing driver	Indianapolis 500 winner (1914).	
29	November	Graham Hill	46	British	Racing driver	Formula One World Champion (1962, 1968). Indianapolis 500 winner (1963). Winner of the 24 Hours of Le Mans (1972).	

== See also ==
- List of 1975 motorsport champions
