= 1960 in motorsport =

The following is an overview of the events of 1960 in motorsport including the major racing events, motorsport venues that were opened and closed during a year, championships and non-championship events that were established and disestablished in a year, and births and deaths of racing drivers and other motorsport people.

== Annual events ==
The calendar includes only annual major non-championship events or annual events that had own significance separate from the championship. For the dates of the championship events see related season articles.

Date	Event	Ref
24 February	2nd Daytona 500	
8 May	44th Targa Florio	
29 May	18th Monaco Grand Prix	
30 May	44th Indianapolis 500	
13–17 June	42nd Isle of Man TT	
25–26 June	28th 24 Hours of Le Mans	
6 November	7th Macau Grand Prix	
20 November	1st Armstrong 500	

== Births ==
Date	Month	Name	Nationality	Occupation	Note	Ref
21	March	Ayrton Senna	Brazilian	Racing driver	Formula One champion (1988, 1990, 1991)	
2	September	Doug Polen	American	Motorcycle racer	Superbike World champion (1991-1992).	
17	September	Damon Hill	British	Racing driver	Formula One World Champion (1996).	
23	October	Wayne Rainey	Australian	Motorcycle racer	500cc Grand Prix motorcycle racing World champion (1990-1992).	
24	October	Joachim Winkelhock	German	Racing driver	24 Hours of Le Mans winner (1999).	

== Deaths ==
Date	Month	Name	Age	Nationality	Occupation	Note	Ref
27	February	Ettore Chimeri	38	Venezuelan	Racing driver	The first Venezuelan Formula One driver.	
13	May	Harry Schell	38	American	Racing driver	The first American Formula One driver.	
19	June	Jimmy Bryan	34	American	Racing driver	Winner of the Indianapolis 500 (1958)	
28	June	Juan Jover	56	Spanish	Racing driver	The first Spanish Formula One driver.	

== See also ==
- List of 1960 motorsport champions
