= 1921 in motorsport =

The following is an overview of the events of 1921 in motorsport including the major racing events, motorsport venues that were opened and closed during a year, championships and non-championship events that were established and disestablished in a year, and births and deaths of racing drivers and other motorsport people.

== Annual events ==
The calendar includes only annual major non-championship events or annual events that had own significance separate from the championship. For the dates of the championship events see related season articles.

| Date | Event | Ref |
|---|---|---|
| 29 May | 12th Targa Florio | |
| 30 May | 9th Indianapolis 500 | |
| 14–16 June | 10th Isle of Man TT | |

== Births ==
| Date | Month | Name | Nationality | Occupation | Note | Ref |
|---|---|---|---|---|---|---|
| 10 | January | Rodger Ward | American | Racing driver | Winner of the Indianapolis 500 (1959, 1962) | |
| 9 | April | Jean-Marie Balestre | French | Auto racing executive administrator | The 9th FIA president | |
| 11 | May | Geoffrey Crossley | British | Racing driver | One of the first British Formula One drivers. | |
| 4 | June | Ettore Chimeri | Venezuelan | Racing driver | The first Venezuelan Formula One driver. | |
| 29 | June | Harry Schell | American | Racing driver | The first American Formula One driver. | |

== See also ==
- List of 1921 motorsport champions
