= 1993 in motorsport =

The following is an overview of the events of 1993 in motorsport including the major racing events, motorsport venues that were opened and closed during a year, championships and non-championship events that were established and disestablished in a year, and births and deaths of racing drivers and other motorsport people.

== Annual events ==
The calendar includes only annual major non-championship events or annual events that had significance separate from the championship. For the dates of the championship events see related season articles.

Date	Event	Ref
1–16 January	15th Dakar Rally	
30–31 January	31st 24 Hours of Daytona	
14 February	35th Daytona 500	
2 May	24th Winston 500	
23 May	51st Monaco Grand Prix	
30 May	77th Indianapolis 500	
30 May	34th Coca-Cola 600	
31 May-12 June	76th Isle of Man TT	
11–13 June	21st 24 Hours of Nurburgring	
19–20 June	61st 24 Hours of Le Mans	
25 July	16th Suzuka 8 Hours	
31 July-1 August	45th 24 Hours of Spa	
1 August	3rd Masters of Formula 3	
5 September	44th Mountain Dew Southern 500	
3 October	34th Tooheys 1000	
22 November	40th Macau Grand Prix	
4–5 December	6th Race of Champions	

== Births ==
Date	Month	Name	Nationality	Occupation	Note	Ref
22	January	Rio Haryanto	Indonesian	Racing driver	The first Indonesian Formula One driver.	
17	February	Marc Márquez	Spanish	Motorcycle racer	MotoGP World champion (2013-2014, 2016-2017).	

== Deaths ==
Date	Month	Name	Age	Nationality	Occupation	Note	Ref
1	April	Alan Kulwicki	30	American	Racing driver/Team owner	1992 NASCAR Cup Series Champion	
15	June	James Hunt	45	British	Racing driver	Formula One World Champion (1976).	
13	July	Davey Allison	32	American	Racing driver	Winner of the Daytona 500 (1992)	
22	October	Innes Ireland	63	British	Racing driver	1961 United States Grand Prix winner.	
28	November	Joe Kelly	80	Irish	Racing driver	The first Irish Formula One driver.	

== See also ==
- List of 1993 motorsport champions
