= 1988 in motorsport =

The following is an overview of the events of 1988 in motorsport including the major racing events, motorsport venues that were opened and closed during a year, championships and non-championship events that were established and disestablished in a year, and births and deaths of racing drivers and other motorsport people.

== Annual events ==
The calendar includes only annual major non-championship events or annual events that had significance separate from the championship. For the dates of the championship events see related season articles.

Date	Event	Ref
1–22 January	10th Dakar Rally	
30–31 January	26th 24 Hours of Daytona	
14 February	30th Daytona 500	
15 May	46th Monaco Grand Prix	
29 May	72nd Indianapolis 500	
30 May-10 June	71st Isle of Man TT	
11–12 June	56th 24 Hours of Le Mans	
18–19 June	16th 24 Hours of Nurburgring	
30–31 July	40th 24 Hours of Spa	
31 July	11th Suzuka 8 Hours	
2 October	29th Tooheys 1000	
27 November	35th Macau Grand Prix	
4 December	1st Race of Champions	

== Births ==
Date	Month	Name	Nationality	Occupation	Note	Ref
20	June	Courtney Force	American	Drag racer		
31	October	Sébastien Buemi	Swiss	Racing driver	FIA World Endurance champion (2014). Formula E champion (2015–16).	
6	December	Johan Kristoffersson	Swedish	Racing driver	FIA World Rallycross champion (2017, 2018).	
28	December	Elfyn Evans	British	Rally driver	2017 Wales Rally GB winner.	

== Deaths ==
Date	Month	Name	Age	Nationality	Occupation	Note	Ref
12	January	Piero Taruffi	81	Italian	Racing driver	1952 Swiss Grand Prix winner	
30	September	Al Holbert	41	American	Racing driver	24 Hours of Le Mans winner (1983, 1986-1987).	

== See also ==
- List of 1988 motorsport champions
