= 1954 in motorsport =

The following is an overview of the events of 1954 in motorsport including the major racing events, motorsport venues that were opened and closed during a year, championships and non-championship events that were established and disestablished in a year, and births and deaths of racing drivers and other motorsport people.

== Annual events ==
The calendar includes only annual major non-championship events or annual events that had own significance separate from the championship. For the dates of the championship events see related season articles.

Date	Event	Ref
1–2 May	21st Mille Miglia	
20 May	38th Targa Florio	
31 May	38th Indianapolis 500	
12–13 June	22nd 24 Hours of Le Mans	
14–19 June	36th Isle of Man TT	
31 October	1st Macau Grand Prix	

== Births ==
Date	Month	Name	Nationality	Occupation	Note	Ref
31	January	Mauro Baldi	Italian	Racing driver	24 Hours of Le Mans winner (1994). World Endurance champion (1990).	
26	June	Marco Lucchinelli	Italian	Motorcycle racer	500cc Grand Prix motorcycle racing World champion (1981).	
27	August	Derek Warwick	British	Racing driver	24 Hours of Le Mans winner (1992). World Endurance champion (1992).	
14	November	Eliseo Salazar	Chilean	Racing driver	The first Chilean Formula One driver.	
10	December	Price Cobb	American	Racing driver	24 Hours of Le Mans winner (1990).	

== Deaths ==
Date	Month	Name	Age	Nationality	Occupation	Note	Ref
31	July	Onofre Marimón	30	Argentine	Racing driver	F1 Podium Finisher (1953 Belgian Grand Prix, 1954 British Grand Prix)	
30	October	Wilbur Shaw	51	American	Racing driver	Indianapolis 500 winner (1937, 1939, 1940).	

== See also ==
- List of 1954 motorsport champions
