= 1965 in motorsport =

The following is an overview of the events of 1965 in motorsport including the major racing events, motorsport venues that were opened and closed during a year, championships and non-championship events that were established and disestablished in a year, and births and deaths of racing drivers and other motorsport people.

== Annual events ==
The calendar includes only annual major non-championship events or annual events that had significance separate from the championship, for the dates of the championship events see related season articles.

Date	Event	Ref
14 February	7th Daytona 500	
28 February	Daytona 2000 km	
9 May	49th Targa Florio	
30 May	23rd Monaco Grand Prix	
31 May	49th Indianapolis 500	
14–18 June	47th Isle of Man TT	
19–20 June	33rd 24 Hours of Le Mans	
24–25 July	17th 24 Hours of Spa	
3 October	6th Armstrong 500	
28 November	12th Macau Grand Prix	

== Births ==
Date	Month	Name	Nationality	Occupation	Note	Ref
4	June	Mick Doohan	Australian	Motorcycle racer	500cc Grand Prix motorcycle racing World champion (1994-1998).	
1	July	Carl Fogarty	British	Motorcycle racer	Superbike World champion (1994-1995, 1998-1999).	
5	September	David Brabham	Australian	Racing driver	24 Hours of Le Mans winner (2009).	

== Deaths ==
Date	Month	Name	Age	Nationality	Occupation	Note	Ref
6	March	Jules Goux	79	French	Racing driver	Indianapolis 500 winner (1913).	

== See also ==
- List of 1965 motorsport champions
