= 2000 in motorsport =

The following is an overview of the events of 2000 in motorsport including the major racing events, motorsport venues that were opened and closed during a year, championships and non-championship events that were established and disestablished in a year, and births and deaths of racing drivers and other motorsport people.

== Annual events ==
The calendar includes only annual major non-championship events or annual events that had significance separate from the championship. For the dates of the championship events see related season articles.

Date	Event	Ref
6–23 January	22nd Dakar Rally	
5–6 February	38th 24 Hours of Daytona	
20 February	42nd Daytona 500	
28 May	84th Indianapolis 500	
4 June	58th Monaco Grand Prix	
27 May-10 June	83rd Isle of Man TT	
17–18 June	68th 24 Hours of Le Mans	
24–25 June	28th 24 Hours of Nurburgring	
30 July	23rd Suzuka 8 Hours	
5–6 August	52nd 24 Hours of Spa	
6 August	10th Masters of Formula 3	
19 November	43rd FAI 1000	
19 November	47th Macau Grand Prix	
9–10 December	13th Race of Champions	

== See also ==
- List of 2000 motorsport champions
