= 1936 in motorsport =

The following is an overview of the events of 1936 in motorsport including the major racing events, motorsport venues that were opened and closed during a year, championships and non-championship events that were established and disestablished in a year, and births and deaths of racing drivers and other motorsport people.

== Annual events ==
The calendar includes only annual major non-championship events or annual events that had own significance separate from the championship. For the dates of the championship events see related season articles.

Date	Event	Ref
5–6 April	10th Mille Miglia	
13 April	8th Monaco Grand Prix	
30 May	24th Indianapolis 500	
16–19 June	25th Isle of Man TT	
11–12 July	11th 24 Hours of Spa	
20 December	27th Targa Florio	

== Births ==
Date	Month	Name	Nationality	Occupation	Note	Ref
4	March	Jim Clark	British	Racing driver	Formula One World Champion (1963, 1965). Winner of the 1965 Indianapolis 500.	
18	June	Denny Hulme	New Zealand	Racing driver	Formula One World Champion (1967).	
5	August	Gordon Johncock	American	Racing driver	Indianapolis 500 winner (1973, 1982).	

== Deaths ==
Date	Month	Name	Age	Nationality	Occupation	Note	Ref
27	June	Bernard Rubin	39	Australian	Racing driver	24 Hours of Le Mans winner (1928).	

== See also ==
- List of 1936 motorsport champions
