= 2010 in motorsport =

The following is an overview of the events that occurred in the year 2010 in the area of motorsports including the major racing events, motorsport venues that were opened and closed during a year, championships and non-championship events that were established and disestablished in a year, and birth and death of racing drivers and other motorsport people.

== Annual events ==
The calendar includes only annual major non-championship events or annual events that had significance separate from the championship. For the dates of the championship events see related season articles.

Date	Event	Ref
3–17 January	32nd Dakar Rally	
30–31 January	48th 24 Hours of Daytona	
14 February	52nd Daytona 500	
15–16 May	38th 24 Hours of Nurburgring	
16 May	68th Monaco Grand Prix	
30 May	94th Indianapolis 500	
6 June	20th Masters of Formula 3	
29 May-11 June	92nd Isle of Man TT	
12–13 June	78th 24 Hours of Le Mans	
31 July-1 August	62nd 24 Hours of Spa	
25 July	33rd Suzuka 8 Hours	
10 October	53rd Supercheap Auto Bathurst 1000	
21 November	57th Macau Grand Prix	
27–28 November	23rd Race of Champions	

== Disestablished championships/events ==
Last race	Championship	Ref
12 September	Formula BMW Europe	
21 November	Formula BMW Pacific	

== See also ==
- List of 2010 motorsport champions
