= 1938 in motorsport =

The following is an overview of the events of 1938 in motorsport including the major racing events, motorsport venues that were opened and closed during a year, championships and non-championship events that were established and disestablished in a year, and births and deaths of racing drivers and other motorsport people.

== Annual events ==
The calendar includes only annual major non-championship events or annual events that had own significance separate from the championship. For the dates of the championship events see related season articles.

Date	Event	Ref
3–4 April	12th Mille Miglia	
22 May	29th Targa Florio	
30 May	26th Indianapolis 500	
13–17 June	27th Isle of Man TT	
17–18 June	15th 24 Hours of Le Mans	
9–10 July	12th 24 Hours of Spa	

== Births ==
Date	Month	Name	Nationality	Occupation	Note	Ref
3	January	Ove Andersson	Swedish	Rally driver	1975 Safari Rally winner.	
12	March	Johnny Rutherford	American	Racing driver	Indianapolis 500 winner (1974, 1976, 1980).	

== Deaths ==
Date	Month	Name	Age	Nationality	Occupation	Note	Ref
6	September 1938	John Stuart Hindmarsh	30	British	Racing driver	24 Hours of Le Mans winner (1936).	
2	October	André Lagache	53	French	Racing driver	Winner of the inaugural 24 Hours of Le Mans (1923)	

== See also ==
- List of 1938 motorsport champions
