= 1963 in motorsport =

The following is an overview of the events of 1963 in motorsport including the major racing events, motorsport venues that were opened and closed during a year, championships and non-championship events that were established and disestablished in a year, and births and deaths of racing drivers and other motorsport people.

== Annual events ==
The calendar includes only annual major non-championship events or annual events that had own significance separate from the championship. For the dates of the championship events see related season articles.

Date	Event	Ref
17 February	3 Hours of Daytona	
24 February	5th Daytona 500	
5 May	47th Targa Florio	
26 May	21st Monaco Grand Prix	
30 May	47th Indianapolis 500	
10–14 June	45th Isle of Man TT	
15–16 June	31st 24 Hours of Le Mans	
6 October	4th Armstrong 500	
17 November	10th Macau Grand Prix	

== Births ==
Date	Month	Name	Nationality	Occupation	Note	Ref
16	March	Jesús Puras	Spanish	Rally driver	2001 Tour de Corse winner.	
16	July	Armin Schwarz	German	Rally driver	1991 Rally Catalunya winner.	
29	December	Andrea Aghini	Italian	Rally driver	1992 Rallye Sanremo winner.	

== Deaths ==
Date	Month	Name	Age	Nationality	Occupation	Note	Ref
7	February	Peter Mitchell-Thomson	49	British	Racing driver	24 Hours of Le Mans winner (1949).	
29	November	Lee Wallard	53	American	Racing driver	Winner of the Indianapolis 500 (1951)	

== See also ==
- List of 1963 motorsport champions
