= 1987 in motorsport =

The following is an overview of the events of 1987 in motorsport including the major racing events, motorsport venues that were opened and closed during a year, championships and non-championship events that were established and disestablished in a year, and births and deaths of racing drivers and other motorsport people.

== Annual events ==
The calendar includes only annual major non-championship events or annual events that had significance separate from the championship. For the dates of the championship events see related season articles.

Date	Event	Ref
1–22 January	9th Dakar Rally	
31 January-1 February	25th 24 Hours of Daytona	
15 February	29th Daytona 500	
25 May-5 June	70th Isle of Man TT	
24 May	71st Indianapolis 500	
31 May	45th Monaco Grand Prix	
13–14 June	55th 24 Hours of Le Mans	
20–21 June	15th 24 Hours of Nurburgring	
1–2 August	39th 24 Hours of Spa	
26 July	10th Suzuka 8 Hours	
4 October	28th James Hardie 1000	
29 November	34th Macau Grand Prix	

== Births ==
Date	Month	Name	Nationality	Occupation	Note	Ref
2	February	Jonathan Rea	British	Motorcycle racer	Superbike World champion (2015-2017).	
20	April	Hayden Paddon	New Zealand	Rally driver	2016 Rally Argentina winner.	
4	May	Jorge Lorenzo	Spanish	Motorcycle racer	MotoGP World champion (2010, 2012, 2015).	
3	July	Sebastian Vettel	German	Racing driver	Formula One World Champion (2010-2013)	
19	August	Nico Hülkenberg	German	Racing driver	24 Hours of Le Mans winner (2015).	
11	October	Mads Østberg	Norwegian	Rally driver	2012 Rally de Portugal winner.	

== Deaths ==
Date	Month	Name	Age	Nationality	Occupation	Note	Ref
23	August	Didier Pironi	35	French	Racing driver	24 Hours of Le Mans winner (1978).	
19	October	Hermann Lang	78	German	Racing driver	24 Hours of Le Mans winner (1952).	

== See also ==
- List of 1987 motorsport champions
