= 1923 in motorsport =

The following is an overview of the events of 1923 in motorsport including the major racing events, motorsport venues that were opened and closed during a year, championships and non-championship events that were established and disestablished in a year, and births and deaths of racing drivers and other motorsport people.

== Annual events ==
The calendar includes only annual major non-championship events or annual events that had own significance separate from the championship. For the dates of the championship events see related season articles.

Date	Event	Ref
15 April	14th Targa Florio	
26–27 May	1st 24 Hours of Le Mans	
30 May	11th Indianapolis 500	
13–16 June	12th Isle of Man TT	

== Births ==
Date	Month	Name	Nationality	Occupation	Note	Ref
11	January	Carroll Shelby	American	Automotive designer and racing driver	24 Hours of Le Mans winner (1959).	
29	March	Geoff Duke	British	Motorcycle racer	500cc Grand Prix motorcycle racing World champion (1951, 1953-1955).	
6	June	Ivor Bueb	British	Racing driver	24 Hours of Le Mans winner (1955, 1957).	
16	June	Ron Flockhart	British	Racing driver	24 Hours of Le Mans winner (1956, 1957).	

== Deaths ==
Date	Month	Name	Age	Nationality	Occupation	Note	Ref
4	September	Howdy Wilcox	34	American	Racing driver	Indianapolis 500 winner (1919).	

== See also ==
- List of 1923 motorsport champions
