= 1984 in motorsport =

The following is an overview of the events of 1984 in motorsport including the major racing events, motorsport venues that were opened and closed during a year, as well as championships and non-championship events that were established and discontinued in that year, and births and deaths of racing drivers and other figures in motorsport people.

== Annual events ==
The calendar includes only major annual non-championship events or events with significance separate of the championship. For the dates of the championship events see related season articles.

Date	Event	Ref
1–20 January	6th Dakar Rally	
4–5 February	22nd 24 Hours of Daytona	
19 February	26th Daytona 500	
27 May	68th Indianapolis 500	
3 June	42nd Monaco Grand Prix	
2–8 June	67th Isle of Man TT	
16–17 June	52nd 24 Hours of Le Mans	
28–29 July	36th 24 Hours of Spa	
29 July	7th Suzuka 8 Hours	
25–26 August	12th 24 Hours of Nurburgring	
30 September	25th James Hardie 1000	
17 November	31st Macau Grand Prix	

== Disestablished championships/events ==
First race	Championship	Ref
23 September	European Formula Two Championship	

== Births ==
Date	Month	Name	Nationality	Occupation	Note	Ref
11	July	Ben Spies	American	Motorcycle racer	Superbike World champion (2009).	
11	August	Lucas di Grassi	Brazilian	Racing driver	Formula E champion (2016–17).	
8	September	Vitaly Petrov	Russian	Racing driver	The first Russian Formula One driver.	
5	November	Nick Tandy	British	Racing driver	24 Hours of Le Mans winner (2015).	
5	December	Neel Jani	Swiss	Racing driver	24 Hours of Le Mans winner (2016). FIA World Endurance champion (2016).	
7	December	Robert Kubica	Polish	Racing driver	The first Polish Formula One driver. 2008 Canadian Grand Prix winner.	

== Deaths ==
Date	Month	Name	Age	Nationality	Occupation	Note	Ref
19	May	Bill Holland	76	American	Racing driver	Indianapolis 500 winner (1949).	
8	September	Johnnie Parsons	66	American	Racing driver	Winner of the Indianapolis 500 (1950)	
7	October	Peter Walker	71	British	Racing driver	24 Hours of Le Mans winner (1951)	

== See also ==
- List of 1984 motorsport champions
