= 2009 in motorsport =

The following is an overview of the events of 2009 in motorsport including the major racing events, motorsport venues that were opened and closed during a year, championships and non-championship events that were established and disestablished in a year, and births and deaths of racing drivers and other motorsport people.

== Annual events ==
The calendar includes only annual major non-championship events or annual events that had significance separate from the championship. For the dates of the championship events see related season articles.

Date	Event	Ref
3–18 January	31st Dakar Rally	
24–25 January	47th 24 Hours of Daytona	
15 February	51st Daytona 500	
23–24 May	37th 24 Hours of Nurburgring	
24 May	67th Monaco Grand Prix	
24 May	93rd Indianapolis 500	
30 May-13 June	91st Isle of Man TT	
13–14 June	77th 24 Hours of Le Mans	
14 June	19th Masters of Formula 3	
25–26 July	61st 24 Hours of Spa	
26 July	32nd Suzuka 8 Hours	
11 October	52nd Supercheap Auto Bathurst 1000	
22 November	56th Macau Grand Prix	
3–4 December	22nd Race of Champions	

== Disestablished championships/events ==
Last race	Championship	Ref
8 November	Formula Renault 2.0 West European Cup	

== Deaths ==
Date	Month	Name	Age	Nationality	Occupation	Note	Ref
2	July	Tony Maggs	72	South African	Racing driver	The first South African Formula One driver.	
13	July	Harry Källström	70	Swedish	Rally driver	1976 Acropolis Rally winner.	
18	July	Ricardo Londoño	59	Colombian	Racing driver	The first Colombian Formula One driver.	
30	September	Pentti Airikkala	64	Finnish	Rally driver	1989 Lombard RAC Rally winner.	

== See also ==
- List of 2009 motorsport champions
