= 1930 in motorsport =

The following is an overview of the events of 1930 in motorsport including the major racing events, motorsport venues that were opened and closed during a year, championships and non-championship events that were established and disestablished in a year, and births and deaths of racing drivers and other motorsport people.

== Annual events ==
The calendar includes only annual major non-championship events or annual events that had own significance separate from the championship. For the dates of the championship events see related season articles.

Date	Event	Ref
6 April	2nd Monaco Grand Prix	
12–13 April	4th Mille Miglia	
4 May	21st Targa Florio	
30 May	18th Indianapolis 500	
16–20 June	19th Isle of Man TT	
21–22 June	8th 24 Hours of Le Mans	
5–6 July	7th 24 Hours of Spa	

== Births ==
Date	Month	Name	Nationality	Occupation	Note	Ref
31	January	Jo Bonnier	Swedish	Racing driver	The first Swedish Formula One driver. 1959 Dutch Grand Prix winner.	
19	February	"Wild Willie" Borsch	American	Drag racer	Driver of the Winged Experess AA/FA	
11	March	Troy Ruttman	American	Racing driver	Winner of the Indianapolis 500 (1952)	
12	June	Innes Ireland	British	Racing driver	1961 United States Grand Prix winner.	
5	August	Richie Ginther	American	Racing driver	1965 Mexican Grand Prix winner.	

== See also ==
- List of 1930 motorsport champions
