= 1980 in motorsport =

The following is an overview of the events of 1980 in motorsport including the major racing events, motorsport venues that were opened and closed during a year, championships and non-championship events that were established and disestablished in a year, and births and deaths of racing drivers and other motorsport people.

== Annual events ==
The calendar includes only annual major non-championship events or annual events that had significance separate from the championship. For the dates of the championship events see related season articles.

Date	Event	Ref
1–23 January	2nd Dakar Rally	
2–3 February	18th 24 Hours of Daytona	
17 February	22nd Daytona 500	
18 May	38th Monaco Grand Prix	
25 May	64th Indianapolis 500	
31 May-6 June	63rd Isle of Man TT	
14–15 June	48th 24 Hours of Le Mans	
26–27 July	32nd 24 Hours of Spa	
27 July	3rd Suzuka 8 Hours	
4–5 October	9th 24 Hours of Nurburgring	
5 October	21st Hardie-Ferodo 1000	
16 November	27th Macau Grand Prix	

== Births ==
Date	Month	Name	Nationality	Occupation	Note	Ref
19	January	Jenson Button	British	Racing driver	Formula One World Champion (2009).	
4	July	Marc Lieb	German	Racing driver	24 Hours of Le Mans winner (2016). FIA World Endurance champion (2016).	
22	July	Scott Dixon	New Zealand	Racing driver	Indianapolis 500 winner (2008).	
5	October	James Toseland	British	Motorcycle racer	Superbike World champion (2004, 2007).	
18	November	François Duval	Belgian	Rally driver	2005 Rally Australia winner.	
14	December	Thed Björk	Swedish	Racing driver	World Touring Car champion (2017).	
17	December	Ryan Hunter-Reay	American	Racing driver	Indianapolis 500 winner (2014).	

== Deaths ==
Date	Month	Name	Age	Nationality	Occupation	Note	Ref
6	January	Raymond Mays	80	British	Racing driver	One of the first British Formula One drivers.	
26	November	Pete DePaolo	82	American	Racing driver	Indianapolis 500 winner (1925).	

== See also ==
- List of 1980 motorsport champions
