= 1982 in motorsport =

The following is an overview of the events of 1982 in motorsport including the major racing events, motorsport venues that were opened and closed during a year, championships and non-championship events that were established and disestablished in a year, and births and deaths of racing drivers and other motorsport people.

== Annual events ==
The calendar includes only annual major non-championship events or annual events that had significance separate from the championship. For the dates of the championship events see related season articles.

Date	Event	Ref
1–20 January	4th Dakar Rally	
30–31 January	20th 24 Hours of Daytona	
14 February	24th Daytona 500	
23 May	40th Monaco Grand Prix	
30 May	66th Indianapolis 500	
5–11 June	65th Isle of Man TT	
19–20 June	50th 24 Hours of Le Mans	
31 July-1 August	34th 24 Hours of Spa	
1 August	5th Suzuka 8 Hours	
2 October	23rd James Hardie 1000	
2–3 October	11th 24 Hours of Nurburgring	
21 November	29th Macau Grand Prix	

== Births ==
Date	Month	Name	Nationality	Occupation	Note	Ref
12	June	Loïc Duval	French	Racing driver	24 Hours of Le Mans winner (2013). FIA World Endurance champion (2013).	
24	June	Sylvain Guintoli	French	Motorcycle racer	Superbike World champion (2014).	

== See also ==
- List of 1982 motorsport champions
