= 1924 in motorsport =

The following is an overview of the events of 1924 in motorsport including the major racing events, motorsport venues that were opened and closed during a year, championships and non-championship events that were established and disestablished in a year, and births and deaths of racing drivers and other motorsport people.

== Annual events ==
The calendar includes only annual major non-championship events or annual events that had own significance separate from the championship. For the dates of the championship events see related season articles.

Date	Event	Ref
27 April	15th Targa Florio	
30 May	12th Indianapolis 500	
14–15 June	2nd 24 Hours of Le Mans	
23–28 June	13th Isle of Man TT	
19–20 July	1st 24 Hours of Spa	

== Births ==
Date	Month	Name	Nationality	Occupation	Note	Ref
12	January	Olivier Gendebien	Belgian	Racing driver	24 Hours of Le Mans winner (1958, 1960-1962).	
28	July	Luigi Musso	Italian	Racing driver	1956 Argentine Grand Prix winner	
7	December	John Love	Rhodesian	Racing driver	The first Rhodesian Formula One driver. 1962 British Saloon Car Championship winner.	

== Deaths ==
Date	Month	Name	Age	Nationality	Occupation	Note	Ref
2	September	Joe Boyer	35	American	Racing driver	Indianapolis 500 winner (1924).	
3	September	Dario Resta	42	Italian-British	Racing driver	Indianapolis 500 winner (1916).	
15	September	Jimmy Murphy	30	American	Racing driver	Indianapolis 500 winner (1922).	

== See also ==
- List of 1924 motorsport champions
