= 2013 in motorsport =

The following is an overview of the events of 2013 in motorsport, including the major racing events, motorsport venues that were opened and closed during the year, championships and non-championship events that were established and disestablished in a year, and births and deaths of racing drivers and other motorsport people.

== Annual events ==
The calendar includes only annual major non-championship events or annual events that had significance separate from the championship. For the dates of the championship events see related season articles.

Date	Event	Ref
5–19 January	35th Dakar Rally	
26–27 January	51st 24 Hours of Daytona	
24 February	55th Daytona 500	
19–20 May	41st 24 Hours of Nurburgring	
26 May	71st Monaco Grand Prix	
26 May	97th Indianapolis 500	
25 May-7 June	95th Isle of Man TT	
22–23 June	81st 24 Hours of Le Mans	
7 July	23rd Masters of Formula 3	
27–28 July	65th 24 Hours of Spa	
28 July	36th Suzuka 8 Hours	
13 October	56th Supercheap Auto Bathurst 1000	
17 November	60th Macau Grand Prix	

== Disestablished championships/events ==
Last race	Championship	Ref
28 September	Rolex Sports Car Series	
19 October	American Le Mans Series	
20 October	Formula Abarth	

== Deaths ==
Date	Month	Name	Age	Nationality	Occupation	Note	Ref
15	June	José Froilán González	90	Argentine	Racing driver	24 Hours of Le Mans winner (1954).	
29	July	Tony Gaze	93	Australian	Racing driver	The first Australian Formula One driver.	

== See also ==
- List of 2013 motorsport champions
