= 1995 in motorsport =

The following is an overview of the events of 1995 in motorsport including the major racing events, motorsport venues that were opened and closed during a year, championships and non-championship events that were established and disestablished in a year, and births and deaths of racing drivers and other motorsport people.

== Annual events ==
The calendar includes only annual major non-championship events or annual events that had significance separate from the championship. For the dates of the championship events see related season articles.

Date	Event	Ref
1–15 January	17th Dakar Rally	
4–5 February	33rd 24 Hours of Daytona	
19 February	37th Daytona 500	
28 May	53rd Monaco Grand Prix	
28 May	79th Indianapolis 500	
29 May-9 June	78th Isle of Man TT	
17–18 June	63rd 24 Hours of Le Mans	
17–18 June	23rd 24 Hours of Nurburgring	
29–30 July	47th 24 Hours of Spa	
30 July	18th Suzuka 8 Hours	
6 August	5th Masters of Formula 3	
1 October	36st Tooheys 1000	
19 November	42nd Macau Grand Prix	
2–3 December	8th Race of Champions	

== Births ==
Date	Month	Name	Nationality	Occupation	Note	Ref
27	August	Sergey Sirotkin	Russian	Racing driver		

== Deaths ==
Date	Month	Name	Age	Nationality	Occupation	Note	Ref
17	July	Juan Manuel Fangio	84	Argentine	Racing driver	Formula One World Champion (1951, 1954-1957).	
7	November	Louis Meyer	91	American	Racing driver	Indianapolis 500 winner (1928, 1933, 1936).	
27	November	Giancarlo Baghetti	60	Italian	Racing driver	1961 French Grand Prix winner.	

== See also ==
- List of 1995 motorsport champions
