= 1939 in motorsport =

The following is an overview of the events of 1939 in motorsport including the major racing events, motorsport venues that were opened and closed during a year, championships and non-championship events that were established and disestablished in a year, and births and deaths of racing drivers and other motorsport people.

== Annual events ==
The calendar includes only annual major non-championship events or annual events that had own significance separate from the championship. For the dates of the championship events see related season articles.

Date	Event	Ref
14 May	30th Targa Florio	
30 May	27th Indianapolis 500	
12–16 June	28th Isle of Man TT	
17–18 June	16th 24 Hours of Le Mans	

== Births ==
Date	Month	Name	Nationality	Occupation	Note	Ref
1	January	Phil Read	British	Motorcycle racer	500cc Grand Prix motorcycle racing World champion (1973-1974).	
29	May	Al Unser	American	Racing driver	Indianapolis 500 winner (1970-1971, 1978, 1987).	
11	June	Jackie Stewart	British	Racing driver	Formula One World Champion (1969, 1971, 1973).	
30	June	Harry Källström	Swedish	Rally driver	1976 Acropolis Rally winner.	
5	August	Roger Clark	British	Rally driver	1976 Lombard RAC Rally winner.	

== Deaths ==
Date	Month	Name	Age	Nationality	Occupation	Note	Ref
8	February	Bill Cummings	32	American	Racing driver	Indianapolis 500 winner (1934).	
30	May	Floyd Roberts	39	American	Racing driver	Indianapolis 500 winner (1938).	
11	August	Jean Bugatti	30	French	Automotive designer and test engineer		

== See also ==
- List of 1939 motorsport champions
