= 1946 in motorsport =

The following is an overview of the events of 1946 in motorsport including the major racing events, motorsport venues that were opened and closed during a year, championships and non-championship events that were established and disestablished in a year, and births and deaths of racing drivers and other motorsport people.

== Annual events ==
The calendar includes only annual major non-championship events or annual events that had own significance separate from the championship. For the dates of the championship events see related season articles.

Date	Event	Ref
30 May	30th Indianapolis 500	

== Births ==
Date	Month	Name	Nationality	Occupation	Note	Ref
23	January	Don Whittington	American	Racing driver	24 Hours of Le Mans winner (1979).	
25	February	Jean Todt	French	Motor sport executive and rally co-driver	The 11th FIA president	
10	March	Hiroshi Fushida	Japanese	Racing driver	The first Japanese Formula One driver.	
13	May	Jean Rondeau	French	Racing driver	24 Hours of Le Mans winner (1980).	
21	June	Per Eklund	Swedish	Rally driver	1976 Swedish Rally winner.	
29	July	Stig Blomqvist	Swedish	Rally driver	World Rally champion (1984).	
30	September	Jochen Mass	German	Racing driver	1975 Spanish Grand Prix winner. 24 Hours of Le Mans winner (1989).	
29	October	Walter Boyce	Canadian	Rally driver	1973 Press-on-Regardless Rally winner.	
2	November	Alan Jones	Australian	Racing driver	Formula One World Champion (1980).	
11	November	Al Holbert	American	Racing driver	24 Hours of Le Mans winner (1983, 1986-1987).	

== Deaths ==
Date	Month	Name	Age	Nationality	Occupation	Note	Ref
17	June	Joe Dawson	56	American	Racing driver	Indianapolis 500 winner (1912).	
2	September	George Robson	37	American	Racing driver	Indianapolis 500 winner (1946).	

== See also ==
- List of 1946 motorsport champions
