= 1927 in motorsport =

The following provides an overview of the events of 1927 in motorsport, encompassing major racing events, the opening and closure of motorsport venues, the establishment and discontinuation of championships and non-championship events, as well as the births and deaths of racing drivers and other motorsport personalities.

== Annual events ==
The calendar includes only annual major non-championship events or annual events that had own significance separate from the championship. For the dates of the championship events see related season articles.

Date	Event	Ref
26–27 March	1st Mille Miglia	
24 April	18th Targa Florio	
30 May	15th Indianapolis 500	
15–19 June	16th Isle of Man TT	
18–19 June	5th 24 Hours of Le Mans	
9–10 July	4th 24 Hours of Spa	

== Births ==
Date	Month	Name	Nationality	Occupation	Note	Ref
20	April	Phil Hill	American	Racing driver	Formula One World Champion (1961). 24 Hours of Le Mans winner (1958, 1961-1962).	
10	August	Jean Guichet	French	Racing driver	24 Hours of Le Mans winner (1964).	

== Deaths ==
Date	Month	Name	Age	Nationality	Occupation	Note	Ref
2	July	Gérard de Courcelles	37	French	Racing driver	24 Hours of Le Mans winner (1925).	

== See also ==
- List of 1927 motorsport champions
