= 1922 in motorsport =

The following is an overview of the events of 1922 in motorsport including the major racing events, motorsport venues that were opened and closed during a year, championships and non-championship events that were established and disestablished in a year, and births and deaths of racing drivers and other motorsport people.

== Annual events ==
The calendar includes only annual major non-championship events or annual events that had own significance separate from the championship. For the dates of the championship events see related season articles.

Date	Event	Ref
2 April	13th Targa Florio	
30 May	10th Indianapolis 500	
30 May-1 June	11th Isle of Man TT	

== Births ==
Date	Month	Name	Nationality	Occupation	Note	Ref
12	May	Roy Salvadori	British	Racing driver	24 Hours of Le Mans winner (1959).	
11	July	Fritz Riess	German	Racing driver	24 Hours of Le Mans winner (1952).	
5	October	José Froilán González	Argentine	Racing driver	24 Hours of Le Mans winner (1954).	

== See also ==
- List of 1922 motorsport champions
