= 1977 in motorsport =

The following is an overview of the events of 1977 in motorsport including the major racing events, motorsport venues that were opened and closed during a year, championships and non-championship events that were established and disestablished in a year, and births and deaths of racing drivers and other motorsport people.

== Annual events ==
The calendar includes only annual major non-championship events or annual events that had significance separate from the championship. For the dates of the championship events see related season articles.

Date	Event	Ref
5–6 February	15th 24 Hours of Daytona	
20 February	19th Daytona 500	
15 May	61st Targa Florio	
22 May	35th Monaco Grand Prix	
29 May	61st Indianapolis 500	
11–12 June	45th 24 Hours of Le Mans	
11–17 June	59th Isle of Man TT	
23–24 July	29th 24 Hours of Spa	
2 October	18th Hardie-Ferodo 1000	
8–9 October	6th 24 Hours of Nurburgring	
20 November	24th Macau Grand Prix	

== Births ==
Date	Month	Name	Nationality	Occupation	Note	Ref
14	January	Narain Karthikeyan	Indian	Racing driver	The first Indian Formula One driver.	
28	January	Takuma Sato	Japanese	Racing driver	Indianapolis 500 winner (2017).	
14	December	Romain Dumas	French	Racing driver	24 Hours of Le Mans winner (2010, 2016). FIA World Endurance champion (2016).	

== Deaths ==
Date	Month	Name	Age	Nationality	Occupation	Note	Ref
18	March	José Carlos Pace	32	Brazilian	Racing driver	1975 Brazilian Grand Prix winner.	
31	May	Floyd Davis	72	American	Racing driver	Indianapolis 500 winner (1941).	
9	September	Russell "Jungle Jim". Liberman	31	American	drag racer		

–

== See also ==
- List of 1977 motorsport champions
