= 1929 in motorsport =

The following is an overview of the events of 1929 in motorsport including the major racing events, motorsport venues that were opened and closed during a year, championships and non-championship events that were established and disestablished in a year, and births and deaths of racing drivers and other motorsport people.

== Annual events ==
The calendar includes only annual major non-championship events or annual events that had own significance separate from the championship. For the dates of the championship events see related season articles.

Date	Event	Ref
13–14 April	3rd Mille Miglia	
14 April	1st Monaco Grand Prix	
5 May	20th Targa Florio	
30 May	17th Indianapolis 500	
10–14 June	18th Isle of Man TT	
15–16 June	7th 24 Hours of Le Mans	
6–7 July	6th 24 Hours of Spa	

== Births ==
Date	Month	Name	Nationality	Occupation	Note	Ref
15	February	Graham Hill	British	Racing driver	Formula One World Champion (1962, 1968). Indianapolis 500 winner (1963). Winner of the 24 Hours of Le Mans (1972).	
10	April	Mike Hawthorn	British	Racing driver	Formula One World Champion (1958). Winner of the 24 Hours of Le Mans (1955)	

== Deaths ==
Date	Month	Name	Age	Nationality	Occupation	Note	Ref
15	June	Ray Keech	29	American	Racing driver	Indianapolis 500 winner (1929).	

== See also ==
- List of 1929 motorsport champions
