= 1997 in motorsport =

The following is an overview of the events of 1997 in motorsport including the major racing events, motorsport venues that were opened and closed during a year, championships and non-championship events that were established and disestablished in a year, and births and deaths of racing drivers and other motorsport people.

== Annual events ==
The calendar includes only annual major non-championship events or annual events that had significance separate from the championship. For the dates of the championship events see related season articles.

| Date | Event | Ref |
|---|---|---|
| 4–19 January | 19th Dakar Rally | |
| 1–2 February | 35th 24 Hours of Daytona | |
| 16 February | 39th Daytona 500 | |
| 11 May | 55th Monaco Grand Prix | |
| 26–27 May | 81st Indianapolis 500 | |
| 26 May-6 June | 80th Isle of Man TT | |
| 7–8 June | 25th 24 Hours of Nurburgring | |
| 14–15 June | 65th 24 Hours of Le Mans | |
| 26–27 July | 49th 24 Hours of Spa | |
| 27 July | 20th Suzuka 8 Hours | |
| 3 August | 7th Masters of Formula 3 | |
| 5 October | 38th AMP Bathurst 1000 | |
| 19 October | 39th Primus 1000 Classic | |
| 16 November | 44th Macau Grand Prix | |
| 6–7 December | 10th Race of Champions | |

== Deaths ==
| Date | Month | Name | Age | Nationality | Occupation | Note | Ref |
|---|---|---|---|---|---|---|---|
| 19 | May | Troy Ruttman | 67 | American | Racing driver | Winner of the Indianapolis 500 (1952) | |
| 6 | June | Eitel Cantoni | 90 | Uruguayan | Racing driver | The first Uruguayan Formula One driver. | |

== See also ==
- List of 1997 motorsport champions
