= 1919 in motorsport =

The following is an overview of the events of 1919 in motorsport including the major racing events, motorsport venues that were opened and closed during a year, championships and non-championship events that were established and disestablished in a year, and births and deaths of racing drivers and other motorsport people.

== Annual events ==
The calendar includes only annual major non-championship events or annual events that had own significance separate from the championship. For the dates of the championship events see related season articles.

Date	Event	Ref
31 May	7th Indianapolis 500	
23 November	10th Targa Florio	

== Births ==
Date	Month	Name	Nationality	Occupation	Note	Ref
24	August	Dries van der Lof	Dutch	Racing driver	One of the first Dutch Formula One drivers.	
2	October	Jan Flinterman	Dutch	Racing driver	One of the first Dutch Formula One drivers.	
