= 1949 in motorsport =

The following is an overview of the events of 1949 in motorsport including the major racing events, motorsport venues that were opened and closed during a year, championships and non-championship events that were established and disestablished in a year, and births and deaths of racing drivers and other motorsport people.

== Annual events ==
The calendar includes only annual major non-championship events or annual events that had own significance separate from the championship. For the dates of the championship events see related season articles.

Date	Event	Ref
20 March	33rd Targa Florio	
24–25 April	16th Mille Miglia	
30 May	33rd Indianapolis 500	
6–17 June	31st Isle of Man TT	
25–26 June	17th 24 Hours of Le Mans	
9–10 July	14th 24 Hours of Spa	

== Births ==
Date	Month	Name	Nationality	Occupation	Note	Ref
22	February	Niki Lauda	Austrian	Racing driver	Formula One World Champion (1975, 1977, 1984).	
23	May	Jerry Sneva	American	Racing driver	1977 Indianapolis 500 Rookie of the Year	
8	August	Ricardo Londoño	Colombian	Racing driver	The first Colombian Formula One driver.	
12	August	Louis Krages	German	Racing driver	24 Hours of Le Mans winner (1985).	
11	September	Bill Whittington	American	Racing driver	24 Hours of Le Mans winner (1979).	
5	October	Klaus Ludwig	German	Racing driver	24 Hours of Le Mans winner (1979, 1984, 1985).	
27	November	Masanori Sekiya	Japanese	Racing driver	24 Hours of Le Mans winner (1995).	

== Deaths ==
Date	Month	Name	Age	Nationality	Occupation	Note	Ref
28	January	Jean-Pierre Wimille	40	French	Racing driver	24 Hours of Le Mans winner (1937, 1939).	
7	March	Lora L. Corum	50	American	Racing driver	Indianapolis 500 winner (1924).	

== See also ==
- List of 1949 motorsport champions
