= 1967 in motorsport =

The following is an overview of the events of 1967 in motorsport including the major racing events, motorsport venues that were opened and closed during a year, championships and non-championship events that were established and disestablished in a year, and births and deaths of racing drivers and other motorsport people.

== Annual events ==
The calendar includes only annual major non-championship events or annual events that had own significance separate from the championship. For the dates of the championship events see related season articles.

Date	Event	Ref
4–5 February	6th 24 Hours of Daytona	
26 February	9th Daytona 500	
7 May	25th Monaco Grand Prix	
14 May	51st Targa Florio	
30–31 May	51st Indianapolis 500	
10–11 June	35th 24 Hours of Le Mans	
12–16 June	49th Isle of Man TT	
22–23 July	19th 24 Hours of Spa	
1 October	8th Gallaher 500	
19 November	14th Macau Grand Prix	

== Established championships/events ==
First race	Championship	Ref
24 March	European Formula Two Championship	

== Births ==
Date	Month	Name	Nationality	Occupation	Note	Ref
7	July	Tom Kristensen	Danish	Racing driver	24 Hours of Le Mans winner (1997, 2000-2005, 2008, 2013). FIA World Endurance champion (2013).	
22	September	Hannes Arch	Austrian	Air racer	Red Bull Air World Race champion (2008).	
14	October	Jason Plato	British	Racing driver	BTCC Champion (2001, 2010)	
31	October	Buddy Lazier	American	Racing driver	Indianapolis 500 winner (1996).	
11	November	Gil de Ferran	Brazilian	Racing driver	Indianapolis 500 winner (2003).	

== Deaths ==
Date	Month	Name	Age	Nationality	Occupation	Note	Ref
10	May	Lorenzo Bandini	31	Italian	Racing driver	1964 Austrian Grand Prix winner.	

== See also ==
- List of 1967 motorsport champions
