= 1999 in motorsport =

The following is an overview of the events of 1999 in motorsport including the major racing events, motorsport venues that were opened and closed during a year, championships and non-championship events that were established and disestablished in a year, and births and deaths of racing drivers and other motorsport people.

== Annual events ==
The calendar includes only annual major non-championship events or annual events that had significance separate from the championship. For the dates of the championship events see related season articles.

Date	Event	Ref
1–17 January	21st Dakar Rally	
30–31 January	37th 24 Hours of Daytona	
14 February	41st Daytona 500	
16 May	57th Monaco Grand Prix	
30 May	83rd Indianapolis 500	
5–6 June	27th 24 Hours of Nurburgring	
29 May-11 June	82nd Isle of Man TT	
12–13 June	67th 24 Hours of Le Mans	
3–4 July	51st 24 Hours of Spa	
25 July	22nd Suzuka 8 Hours	
8 August	9th Masters of Formula 3	
14 November	42nd FAI 1000	
21 November	46th Macau Grand Prix	
4–5 December	12th Race of Champions	

== See also ==
- List of 1999 motorsport champions
