= 1926 in motorsport =

The following is an overview of the events of 1926 in motorsport including the major racing events, motorsport venues that were opened and closed during a year, championships and non-championship events that were established and disestablished in a year, and births and deaths of racing drivers and other motorsport people.

== Annual events ==
The calendar includes only annual major non-championship events or annual events that had own significance separate from the championship. For the dates of the championship events see related season articles.

Date	Event	Ref
25 April	17th Targa Florio	
31 May	14th Indianapolis 500	
12–13 June	4th 24 Hours of Le Mans	
17–21 June	15th Isle of Man TT	
3–4 July	3rd 24 Hours of Spa	

== Births ==
Date	Month	Name	Nationality	Occupation	Note	Ref
6	January	Pat Flaherty	American	Racing driver	Winner of the Indianapolis 500 (1956)	
28	January	Jimmy Bryan	American	Racing driver	Winner of the Indianapolis 500 (1958)	
2	April	Jack Brabham	Australian	Racing driver	Formula One World Champion (1959-1960, 1966).	
4	May	Umberto Masetti	Italian	Motorcycle racer	500cc Grand Prix motorcycle racing World champion (1950, 1952).	
20	May	Bob Sweikert	American	Racing driver	Winner of the Indianapolis 500 (1955)	
20	September	Libero Liberati	Italian	Motorcycle racer	500cc Grand Prix motorcycle racing World champion (1957).	
11	November	Maria Teresa de Filippis	Italian	Racing driver	The first female Formula One driver.	

== See also ==
- List of 1926 motorsport champions
