= 1966 in motorsport =

The following is an overview of the events of 1966 in motorsport including the major racing events, motorsport venues that were opened and closed during a year, championships and non-championship events that were established and disestablished in a year, and births and deaths of racing drivers and other motorsport people.

== Annual events ==
The calendar includes only annual major non-championship events or annual events that had significance separate from the championship. For the dates of the championship events see related season articles.

| Date | Event | Ref |
|---|---|---|
| 5–6 February (Note: The first 24 Hour-distance race.) | 5th 24 Hours of Daytona | |
| 27 February | 8th Daytona 500 | |
| 8 May | 50th Targa Florio | |
| 22 May | 24th Monaco Grand Prix | |
| 30 May | 50th Indianapolis 500 | |
| 18–19 June | 34th 24 Hours of Le Mans | |
| 23–24 July | 18th 24 Hours of Spa | |
| 28 August-2 September | 48th Isle of Man TT | |
| 2 October | 7th Gallaher 500 | |
| 20 November | 13th Macau Grand Prix | |

== Births ==
| Date | Month | Name | Nationality | Occupation | Note | Ref |
|---|---|---|---|---|---|---|
| 31 | January | JJ Lehto | Finnish | Racing driver | 24 Hours of Le Mans winner (1995, 2005). | |
| 21 | March | Kenny Bräck | Swedish | Racing driver | Indianapolis 500 winner (1999). | |
| 8 | April | Mark Blundell | British | Racing driver | 24 Hours of Le Mans winner (1992). | |
| 8 | April | Harri Rovanperä | Finnish | Rally driver | 2001 Swedish Rally winner. | |
| 27 | April | Marco Werner | German | Racing driver | 24 Hours of Le Mans winner (2005-2007). | |
| 14 | July | Ralf Waldmann | German | Motorcycle rider | Winner of the 20 Grand Prix motorcycle racing events (125cc and 250cc). | |
| 10 | August | Éric Hélary | French | Racing driver | 24 Hours of Le Mans winner (1993). | |
| 2 | September | Olivier Panis | French | Racing driver | 1996 Monaco Grand Prix winner | |
| 24 | September | Christophe Bouchut | French | Racing driver | 24 Hours of Le Mans winner (1993). | |
| 20 | December | Matt Neal | British | Racing driver | BTCC Champion (2005-2006, 2011) | |

== Deaths ==
| Date | Month | Name | Age | Nationality | Occupation | Note | Ref |
|---|---|---|---|---|---|---|---|
| 30 | June | Giuseppe Farina | 59 | Italian | Racing driver | The first Formula One World Drivers' Champion. | |

== See also ==
- List of 1966 motorsport champions
