= 1913 in motorsport =

The following is an overview of the events of 1913 in motorsport including the major racing events, motorsport venues that were opened and closed during a year, championships and non-championship events that were established and disestablished in a year, and births and deaths of racing drivers and other motorsport people.

== Annual events ==
The calendar includes only annual major non-championship events or annual events that had own significance separate from the championship. For the dates of the championship events see related season articles.

Date	Event	Ref
11–12 May	8th Targa Florio	
30 May	3rd Indianapolis 500	
4–6 June	7th Isle of Man TT	

== Births ==
Date	Month	Name	Nationality	Occupation	Note	Ref
13	March	Joe Kelly	Irish	Racing driver	The first Irish Formula One driver.	
28	May	Peter Mitchell-Thomson	British	Racing driver	24 Hours of Le Mans winner (1949).	
