= 1914 in motorsport =

The following is an overview of the events of 1914 in motorsport including the major racing events, motorsport venues that were opened and closed during a year, championships and non-championship events that were established and disestablished in a year, and births and deaths of racing drivers and other motorsport people.

== Annual events ==
The calendar includes only annual major non-championship events or annual events that had own significance separate from the championship. For the dates of the championship events see related season articles.

Date	Event	Ref
19–21 May	8th Isle of Man TT	
24–25 May	9th Targa Florio	
30 May	4th Indianapolis 500	

== Births ==
Date	Month	Name	Nationality	Occupation	Note	Ref
19	January	Bob Gerard	British	Racing driver	One of the first British Formula One drivers.	
22	June	Toulo de Graffenried	Swiss	Racing driver	The first Swiss Formula One driver.	
13	July	Sam Hanks	American	Racing driver	Winner of the Indianapolis 500 (1957)	
15	July	Birabongse Bhanudej	Thai	Racing driver	The first Thai Formula One driver.	
12	November	Peter Whitehead	British	Racing driver	24 Hours of Le Mans winner (1951)	
