= 1986 in motorsport =

The following is an overview of the events of 1986 in motorsport including the major racing events, motorsport venues that were opened and closed during a year, championships and non-championship events that were established and disestablished in a year, and births and deaths of racing drivers and other motorsport people.

== Annual events ==
The calendar includes only annual major non-championship events or annual events that had significance separate from the championship. For the dates of the championship events see related season articles.

Date	Event	Ref
1–22 January	8th Dakar Rally	
1–2 February	24th 24 Hours of Daytona	
16 February	28th Daytona 500	
11 May	44th Monaco Grand Prix	
31 May	70th Indianapolis 500	
31 May-6 June	69th Isle of Man TT	
31 May-1 June	54th 24 Hours of Le Mans	
21–22 June	14th 24 Hours of Nurburgring	
27 July	9th Suzuka 8 Hours	
2–3 August	38th 24 Hours of Spa	
5 October	27th James Hardie 1000	
23 November	33rd Macau Grand Prix	

== See also ==
- List of 1986 motorsport champions
