= 1935 in motorsport =

The following is an overview of the events of 1935 in motorsport including the major racing events, motorsport venues that were opened and closed during a year, championships and non-championship events that were established and disestablished in a year, and births and deaths of racing drivers and other motorsport people.

== Annual events ==
The calendar includes only annual major non-championship events or annual events that had own significance separate from the championship. For the dates of the championship events see related season articles.

Date	Event	Ref
14–15 April	26th Targa Florio	
22 April	7th Monaco Grand Prix	
30 April	9th Mille Miglia	
30 May	23rd Indianapolis 500	
15–16 June	13th 24 Hours of Le Mans	
17–22 June	24th Isle of Man TT	

== Championships ==
- 1935 Grand Prix season
- 1935 AAA Championship Car season

== Births ==
Date	Month	Name	Nationality	Occupation	Note	Ref
16	January	A. J. Foyt	American	Racing driver	Indianapolis 500 winner (1961, 1964, 1967, 1967). 24 Hours of Le Mans winner (1967).	
23	July	Jim Hall	American	Racing driver	Constructed the first vacuum car in 1970, being the Chaparral 2J.	
21	December	Lorenzo Bandini	Italian	Racing driver	1964 Austrian Grand Prix winner. Winner of the 24 Hours of Le Mans (1963).	
26	December	Moisés Solana	Mexican	Racing driver		

== See also ==
- List of 1935 motorsport champions
