= 1928 in motorsport =

The following is an overview of the events of 1928 in motorsport including the major racing events, motorsport venues that were opened and closed during a year, championships and non-championship events that were established and disestablished in a year, and births and deaths of racing drivers and other motorsport people.

== Annual events ==
The calendar includes only annual major non-championship events or annual events that had own significance separate from the championship. For the dates of the championship events see related season articles.

Date	Event	Ref
31 March-1 April	2nd Mille Miglia	
6 May	19th Targa Florio	
30 May	16th Indianapolis 500	
16–17 June	6th 24 Hours of Le Mans	
16–20 June	17th Isle of Man TT	
7–8 July	5th 24 Hours of Spa	

== Births ==
Date	Month	Name	Nationality	Occupation	Note	Ref
23	February	Hans Herrmann	German	Racing driver	24 Hours of Le Mans winner (1970).	
16	July	Jim Rathmann	American	Racing driver	Winner of the Indianapolis 500 (1960)	
9	October	Pat O'Connor	American	Racing driver		

== Deaths ==
Date	Month	Name	Age	Nationality	Occupation	Note	Ref
8	April	Frank Lockhart	25	American	Racing driver	Indianapolis 500 winner (1926).	

== See also ==
- List of 1928 motorsport champions
