= 1959 in motorsport =

The following is an overview of the events of 1959 in motorsport including the major racing events, motorsport venues that were opened and closed during a year, championships and non-championship events that were established and disestablished in a year, and births and deaths of racing drivers and other motorsport people.

== Annual events ==
The calendar includes only annual major non-championship events or annual events that had own significance separate from the championship. For the dates of the championship events see related season articles.

Date	Event	Ref
22 February	1st Daytona 500	
10 May	17th Monaco Grand Prix	
24 May	43rd Targa Florio	
30 May	43rd Indianapolis 500	
1–6 June	41st Isle of Man TT	
20–21 June	27th 24 Hours of Le Mans	
15 November	6th Macau Grand Prix	

== Births ==
Date	Month	Name	Nationality	Occupation	Note	Ref
2	April	Juha Kankkunen	Finnish	Rally driver	World Rally champion (1986-1987, 1991, 1993).	
1	June	Martin Brundle	British	Racing driver	24 Hours of Le Mans winner (1990). World Endurance champion (1988).	
7	July	Alessandro Nannini	Italian	Racing driver	1989 Japanese Grand Prix winner.	
11	October	Wayne Gardner	Australian	Motorcycle racer	500cc Grand Prix motorcycle racing World champion (1987).	
18	October	Kirby Chambliss	American	Air racer	Red Bull Air World Race champion (2004, 2006).	

== Deaths ==
Date	Month	Name	Age	Nationality	Occupation	Note	Ref
22	January	Mike Hawthorn	29	British	Racing driver	Formula One World Champion (1958). Winner of the 24 Hours of Le Mans (1955)	
8	June	Leslie Johnson	47	British	Racing driver	One of the first British Formula One drivers.	
1	August	Ivor Bueb	36	British	Racing driver	24 Hours of Le Mans winner (1955, 1957).	

== See also ==
- List of 1959 motorsport champions
