= 1992 in motorsport =

The following is an overview of the events of 1992 in motorsport including the major racing events, motorsport venues that were opened and closed during a year, championships and non-championship events that were established and disestablished in a year, and births and deaths of racing drivers and other motorsport people.

== Annual events ==
The calendar includes only annual major non-championship events or annual events that had significance separate from the championship. For the dates of the championship events see related season articles.

Date	Event	Ref
25 December-16 January	14th Dakar Rally	
1–2 February	30th 24 Hours of Daytona	
16 February	34th Daytona 500	
24 May	76th Indianapolis 500	
31 May	50th Monaco Grand Prix	
1–12 June	75th Isle of Man TT	
20–21 June	60th 24 Hours of Le Mans	
20–21 June	20th 24 Hours of Nurburgring	
26 July	15th Suzuka 8 Hours	
1–2 August	44th 24 Hours of Spa	
2 August	2nd Masters of Formula 3	
4 October	33rd Tooheys 1000	
22 November	39th Macau Grand Prix	
5–6 December	5th Race of Champions	

== Deaths ==
Date	Month	Name	Age	Nationality	Occupation	Note	Ref
4	October	Denny Hulme	56	New Zealand	Racing driver	Formula One World Champion (1967).	
26	December	Jan Flinterman	73	Dutch	Racing driver	One of the first Dutch Formula One drivers.	

== See also ==
- List of 1992 motorsport champions
