= 2005 in motorsport =

The following is an overview of the events of 2005 in motorsport including the major racing events, motorsport venues that were opened and closed during a year, championships and non-championship events that were established and disestablished in a year, and births and deaths of racing drivers and other motorsport people.

== Annual events ==
The calendar includes only annual major non-championship events or annual events that had significance separate from the championship. For the dates of the championship events see related season articles.

| Date | Event | Ref |
|---|---|---|
| 31 December-16 January | 27th Dakar Rally | |
| 5–6 February | 43rd 24 Hours of Daytona | |
| 20 February | 47th Daytona 500 | |
| 7–8 May | 33rd 24 Hours of Nurburgring | |
| 22 May | 63rd Monaco Grand Prix | |
| 29 May | 89th Indianapolis 500 | |
| 28 May-10 June | 87th Isle of Man TT | |
| 12 June | 15th Masters of Formula 3 | |
| 18–19 June | 73rd 24 Hours of Le Mans | |
| 30–31 July | 57th 24 Hours of Spa | |
| 31 July | 28th Suzuka 8 Hours | |
| 9 October | 47th Supercheap Auto 1000 | |
| 20 November | 52nd Macau Grand Prix | |
| 3 December | 18th Race of Champions | |

== Established championships/events ==
| First race | Championship | Ref |
|---|---|---|
| 23 April | GP2 Series | |

== Deaths ==
| Date | Month | Name | Age | Nationality | Occupation | Note | Ref |
|---|---|---|---|---|---|---|---|
| 13 | February | Maurice Trintignant | 87 | French | Racing driver | 24 Hours of Le Mans winner (1954). | |
| 25 | April | John Love | 80 | Rhodesian | Racing driver | The first Rhodesian Formula One driver. 1962 British Saloon Car Championship winner. | |
| 25 | November | Richard Burns | 34 | British | Rally driver | World Rally champion (2001). | |

== See also ==
- List of 2005 motorsport champions
