= 1979 in motorsport =

The following is an overview of the events of 1979 in motorsport including the major racing events, motorsport venues that were opened and closed during a year, championships and non-championship events that were established and disestablished in a year, and births and deaths of racing drivers and other motorsport people.

== Annual events ==
The calendar includes only annual major non-championship events or annual events that had significance separate from the championship. For the dates of the championship events see related season articles.

Date	Event	Ref
26 December-14 January	1st Dakar Rally	
3–4 February	17th 24 Hours of Daytona	
18 February	21st Daytona 500	
27 May	37th Monaco Grand Prix	
27 May	63rd Indianapolis 500	
3–9 June	62nd Isle of Man TT	
9–10 June	47th 24 Hours of Le Mans	
21–22 July	31st 24 Hours of Spa	
29 July	2nd Suzuka 8 Hours	
20 September	20th Hardie-Ferodo 1000	
6–7 October	8th 24 Hours of Nurburgring	
18 November	26th Macau Grand Prix	

== Births ==
Date	Month	Name	Nationality	Occupation	Note	Ref
16	February	Valentino Rossi	Italian	Motorcycle racer	MotoGP World champion (2001-2005, 2008-2009).	
18	April	Anthony Davidson	British	Racing driver	FIA World Endurance champion (2014).	
2	July	Sam Hornish Jr.	American	Racing driver	Indianapolis 500 winner (2006).	
25	December	Robert Huff	British	Racing driver	World Touring Car champion (2012).	

== Deaths ==
Date	Month	Name	Age	Nationality	Occupation	Note	Ref
22	June	Louis Chiron	79	Monegasque	Racing driver	The first Monegasque Formula One driver. 1931 French Grand Prix winner.	

== See also ==
- List of 1979 motorsport champions
