= 1976 in motorsport =

The following is an overview of the events of 1976 in motorsport including the major racing events, motorsport venues that were opened and closed during a year, championships and non-championship events that were established and disestablished in a year, and births and deaths of racing drivers and other motorsport people.

== Annual events ==
The calendar includes only annual major non-championship events or annual events that had significance separate from the championship. For the dates of the championship events see related season articles.

Date	Event	Ref
31 January-1 February	14th 24 Hours of Daytona	
15 February	18th Daytona 500	
14 May	60th Targa Florio	
30 May	34th Monaco Grand Prix	
30 May	60th Indianapolis 500	
7–12 June	58th Isle of Man TT	
12–13 June	44th 24 Hours of Le Mans	
24–25 July	28th 24 Hours of Spa	
25–26 September	5th 24 Hours of Nurburgring	
3 October	17th Hardie-Ferodo 1000	
14 November	23rd Macau Grand Prix	

== Births ==
Date	Month	Name	Nationality	Occupation	Note	Ref
31	January	Buddy Rice	American	Racing driver	Indianapolis 500 winner (2004).	
27	May	Marcel Fässler	Swiss	Racing driver	24 Hours of Le Mans winner (2011-2012, 2014). FIA World Endurance champion (2012).	
20	July	Alex Yoong	Malaysian	Racing driver	The first Malaysian Formula One driver.	
27	August	Mark Webber	Australian	Racing driver	FIA World Endurance champion (2015).	
11	September	Tomáš Enge	Czech	Racing driver	The first Czech Formula One driver.	
7	December	Benoît Tréluyer	French	Racing driver	24 Hours of Le Mans winner (2011-2012, 2014). FIA World Endurance champion (2012).	

== Deaths ==
Date	Month	Name	Age	Nationality	Occupation	Note	Ref
28	July	George Souders	75	American	Racing driver	Indianapolis 500 winner (1927).	
10	November	Billy Arnold	70	American	Racing driver	Indianapolis 500 winner (1930).	

== See also ==
- List of 1976 motorsport champions
