= 2002 in motorsport =

The following is an overview of the events of 2002 in motorsport including the major racing events, motorsport venues that were opened and closed during a year, championships and non-championship events that were established and disestablished in a year, and births and deaths of racing drivers and other motorsport people.

== Annual events ==
The calendar includes only annual major non-championship events or annual events that had significance separate from the championship. For the dates of the championship events see related season articles.

Date	Event	Ref
28 December-13 January	24th Dakar Rally	
2–3 February	40th 24 Hours of Daytona	
17 February	44th Daytona 500	
25 May-7 June	84th Isle of Man TT	
26 May	60th Monaco Grand Prix	
26 May	86th Indianapolis 500	
1–2 June	30th 24 Hours of Nurburgring	
15–16 June	70th 24 Hours of Le Mans	
3–4 August	54th 24 Hours of Spa	
4 August	25th Suzuka 8 Hours	
11 August	12th Masters of Formula 3	
13 October	45th Bob Jane T-Marts 1000	
17 November	49th Macau Grand Prix	
30 November-1 December	15th Race of Champions	

== Deaths ==
Date	Month	Name	Age	Nationality	Occupation	Note	Ref
7	January	Geoffrey Crossley	80	British	Racing driver	One of the first British Formula One drivers.	
9	April	Pat Flaherty	76	American	Racing driver	Winner of the Indianapolis 500 (1956)	
15	November	Roberta Leighton		American	drag racer	First woman licensed by the National Hot Rod Association (NHRA) to race in a Gas class	

== See also ==
- List of 2002 motorsport champions
