= 1932 in motorsport =

The following is an overview of the events of 1932 in motorsport including the major racing events, motorsport venues that were opened and closed during a year, championships and non-championship events that were established and disestablished in a year, and births and deaths of racing drivers and other motorsport people.

== Annual events ==
The calendar includes only annual major non-championship events or annual events that had own significance separate from the championship. For the dates of the championship events see related season articles.

Date	Event	Ref
9–10 April	6th Mille Miglia	
17 April	4th Monaco Grand Prix	
8 May	23rd Targa Florio	
30 May	20th Indianapolis 500	
9–13 June	21st Isle of Man TT	
18–19 June	10th 24 Hours of Le Mans	
9–10 July	9th 24 Hours of Spa	

== Births ==
Date	Month	Name	Nationality	Occupation	Note	Ref
29	February	Masten Gregory	American	Racing driver	24 Hours of Le Mans winner (1965).	

== See also ==
- List of 1932 motorsport champions
