= Gordon Mineo =

American racing driver

- Nationality: American
- Born: June 19, 1945 Detroit, Michigan, U.S.
- Died: September 3, 2006 (aged 61) Lake Texoma, Oklahoma, U.S.
- Relatives: Joseph and Lorraine Mineo
- Wins: 0

Gordon Mineo (June 19, 1945-September 3, 2006), nicknamed "Flash Gordon", was a Top Fuel Funny Car driver.

Mineo was born in Detroit, Michigan, son of Joseph and Lorraine Mineo.

Mineo started racing Funny Cars in the 1960s and continued to race until the 1990s.

Mineo's first national Funny Car event was the 1970 AHRA Winter Nationals at Beeline Dragway in Scottsdale, Arizona; he qualified his Pontiac Firebird funny car #10, but was eliminated in the first round by #7 qualifier Tom "Mongoo$e McEwen. (Mineo earned US$400 for the effort.)

At the 1971 AHRA Winter Nationals, Mineo qualified #21 in a and was eliminated in round there by Dick Rosberg, who qualified #17.

In 1972, Mineo attended the AHRA National Challenge at Tulsa Raceway Park in Tulsa, Oklahoma. He qualified #21 and lost in round one to #5 qualifier Don "The Snake" Prudhomme. (Mineo earned US$500 for this effort.)

At the 1973 NHRA Supernationals, in Ontario, California, Mineo qualified #9 in his 1973 Chevrolet Vega; he again lost in round one to Prudhomme, who qualified his 1973 Plymouth Barracuda #1.

Mineo returned to Scottsdale in 1974, qualifying #8 at the AHRA Winter Nationals. The same year, he attended an ANRA event at Green Valley Raceway in Smithfield, Texas.

Mineo went back to Beeline Dragway for the 1977 AHRA Winter Nationals, qualifying #4; he was eliminated by #12 qualifier Dale Armstrong in the first round. At the 1977 NHRA Springnationals, Mineo qualified #14, only to lose to #6 qualifier (and eventual event class winner) Bob Pickett in the first round.

Mineo never won an NHRA or AHRA national event. He was also featured in a famous photo, being punched by fellow funny car racer Ed "The Ace" McCulloch.

Mineo was killed in a boating accident on Lake Texoma, in Oklahoma, on 3 September 2006, along with his wife, Ann, age 59, Myra Gibson, 51; Amy Lane, 31; and Justin R. Lane, 25. Mineo was 61.

Mineo was buried at Rest Haven Memorial Park, Rockwall, Texas.

Mineo had two children, Jason and Trisha.
