= Riverside International Raceway =

Former motorsport track in the United States

- Grand Prix Layout (1969–1988)
- Location: 22255 Eucalyptus Avenue; Moreno Valley, California; 92388
- Coordinates: 33°56′00.2″N 117°16′20.2″W
- Owner: Sunnymead Land Investors (1971–1989)
- Broke ground: December 1956; 69 years ago
- Opened: September 21, 1957; 69 years ago
- Closed: July 2, 1989; 37 years ago
- Construction cost: Varies by source; $625,000 to $800,000
- Architect: William L. Duquette
- Former names: Riverside International Motor Raceway (early years)
- Major events: Former: NASCAR Cup Series; Winston Western 500 (1958, 1961, 1963–1987); Budweiser 400 (1963, 1970–1988); IMSA GT Championship; Los Angeles Times Grand Prix (1975, 1979–1987); Trans-Am Series (1966–1972, 1980, 1983–1984, 1986); CART; Budweiser 500K (1967–1969, 1981–1983); Formula One; United States Grand Prix (1960)

Long Grand Prix Road Course (1969–1989)
- Surface: Asphalt
- Length: 3.300 mi (5.311 km)
- Turns: 9
- Race lap record: 1:30.656 ( (United States) Kevin Cogan, Penske PC-10, 1982, CART)

NASCAR Course (1969–1989)
- Surface: Asphalt
- Length: 2.620 mi (4.216 km)
- Turns: 9

Sports Car Short Course (1969–1989)
- Surface: Asphalt
- Length: 2.547 mi (4.099 km)
- Turns: 9
- Race lap record: 1:11.079 ( (Republic of Ireland) Michael Roe, VDS-004, 1984, Can-Am)

Original Grand Prix Road Course (1957–1968)
- Surface: Asphalt
- Length: 3.250 mi (5.230 km)
- Turns: 9
- Race lap record: 1:40.400 ( (New Zealand) Bruce McLaren, McLaren M6A, 1967, Can-Am)

Sports Car Short Course (1957–1968)
- Surface: Asphalt
- Length: 2.595 mi (4.176 km)
- Turns: 9
- Race lap record: 1:20.000 ( (United States) Mark Donohue, McLaren M6A, 1968, Can-Am)

Riverside International Raceway (formerly known as the Riverside International Motor Raceway in early years) was an auto racing complex in Moreno Valley, California, within Riverside County. The complex throughout its history featured multiple layouts, including various road course layouts, oval layouts, and a dragstrip. From its opening in 1957 until its closure in 1989, the facility hosted numerous major racing events, including Formula One, NASCAR, and IMSA GT Championship events. The track since its closure has been demolished, with a majority of the former track site now occupied by a shopping district highlighted by the Moreno Valley Mall.

After a failed proposal to build a complex in San Bernardino County the year prior, the West Coast Automotive Testing Corporation, led by Rudy Cleye and John Campbell Edgar, built and completed Riverside International Raceway in 1957. The facility soon fell into financial trouble despite the success of the annual Los Angeles Times Grand Prix, and after a brief stints under various owners, the facility was sold in 1962 to a group led by Edwin Pauley, Fred Levy, and Bob Hope. Under the leadership of longtime track president Les Richter, the track was able to enter financial stability and undergo some renovations. In 1969, with new funding from Lawrence LoPatin, the track underwent further renovations, including a redesign. LoPatin's reign was brief due to financial and organizational troubles with his company American Raceways, Inc., leading to the track's purchase by the Fritz Duda-led Sunnymead Land Investors in 1971.

After Richter's departure as president of the track in 1983, plans were made to build a replacement facility to move all operations of Riverside International Raceway to; however, these plans never materialized. After some delays in the construction of the mall, the track ran its last major events in 1988; demolition started in June of that year. After some local events on a shortened version of the track, the facility ran its final events in 1989.

== Description ==
=== Layouts and configuration ===
Riverside International Raceway (RIR) had multiple layouts designed by James E. Peterson. In its final iteration, the main layout was measured at 3.300 mi (5.311 km) with nine turns. Its NASCAR layout, which bypassed the main layout's seventh turn with a straightaway, was measured at 2.620 mi (4.216 km). Before the ninth turn was changed in 1969 to include a left-turn kink leading into a sweeping right-handed turn, the main layout was measured at 3.250 mi (5.230 km). RIR also featured a dragstrip measured at a 0.250 mi (0.402 km).

=== Amenities ===
RIR was located in Moreno Valley, California, and served by U.S. Route 60 and U.S. Route 395 (now Interstate 215). The track's architecture was designed by William L. Duquette. Permanent seats were constructed in some parts of the track, including turns six and seven alongside the start-finish line.

== Track history ==
=== Planning and construction ===
==== Failed San Bernardino County proposal ====
On January 26, 1956, the San Bernardino County Planning Commission approved a proposal submitted by the United States Automotive Testing Company (USAT), with preliminary plans set to build "an automotive testing plant and race track" on 400-acre (160 ha) plot of land near the city of Ontario. The project, the then-named "Los Angeles International Motor Raceway", was officially announced by USAT on March 6, which included plans to build "several tracks inside a major 5.500 mi (8.851 km) road course" over the span of four years on a budget of $12,000,000 (adjusted for inflation $142,105,263), with an initial opening date in July 1956. In an interview with the Los Angeles Mirror, USAT president Kermit M. Pollack stated that the project was largely funded by a wealthy Southern California family who invested in "lumber, oil, mining, real estate, and stocks". An initial groundbreaking date was set for April 1. The opening of the track was first delayed mid-fall due to a construction project made to improve the access roads that were meant to serve the track, with track developers describing them as "totally inadequate" for the expected demand. After an opening race was scheduled for September 22, the opening was delayed further in June to the spring of 1957 due to slow progress on the access road improvement project. By July, according to racing historian Dick Wallen, USAT was on the brink of collapse due to multiple project leaders departing the project with no work completed on the track. In August, USAT pulled all support and stopped all work on the project, effectively killing the track. According to Pollack, he suspended the project due to "high costs, unusual site problems, and timing as related to area development, access and construction"; in addition, the land's material consisting of "sand and sandy loam" was unsuitable for road paving.

==== Riverside County proposal ====
In September 1956, restaurant owner Rudy Cleye, who was involved with the San Bernardino County proposal, began proposing to the Riverside County Planning Commission to build a road course on a 520-acre (210 ha) plot of land near March Air Force Base. On November 26, the commission approved the proposal by a vote of 3–2. In comparison to the San Bernardino County proposal, Cleye wanted to have "no elaborate press conferences, no expensive public relations treatments, no fancy words, or exaggerated promises". The project, known as "Riverside International Motor Raceway" by December 8, was projected to cost, "without frills", approximately between $750,000 to $1,000,000. As part of the approval, at least $100,000 worth of the track's development was required to be completed within one year. At the time of the approval, Cleye's funding for the facility had run out; soon after, he partnered a frequent visitor at his restaurant, John Campbell Edgar, who invested the initial $100,000 needed.

Work on the facility began in December of that year, with track developers stating hopes of hosting five major events each racing season. Grading on the track was completed by the end of January 1957, with paving of the track starting three months later. By June, master plans had expanded to include a capacity of 200,000, five road course layouts (including a 5 mi (8.0 km) layout), three oval layouts, a restaurant, and a hotel at an expected cost of $3,500,000. In the same month, the track hosted a testing session open to the media, with multiple drivers, including Ken Miles, John McGlaughlin, and John Marcotte participating in the test. On August 11, Paul Wallace of the Press-Telegram announced the first event for the facility: a Sports Car Club of America (SCCA) event from September 21–22. Wallace's report was confirmed later in the month by the track's developers, with the races taking place on a completed 3.250 mi (5.230 km) layout. At the time of its first race, the track had a reported capacity of 7,000. The construction cost varies by source. Sources at the time of its construction list a price of $800,000. This figure is disputed by MotoRacing's Gus Vignolle, who estimated a price of $625,000. The five-mile circuit, which consisted of an approximate 2 mi (3.2 km) circuit at the northeast part of the track, was never constructed due to financial issues.

=== Early years ===
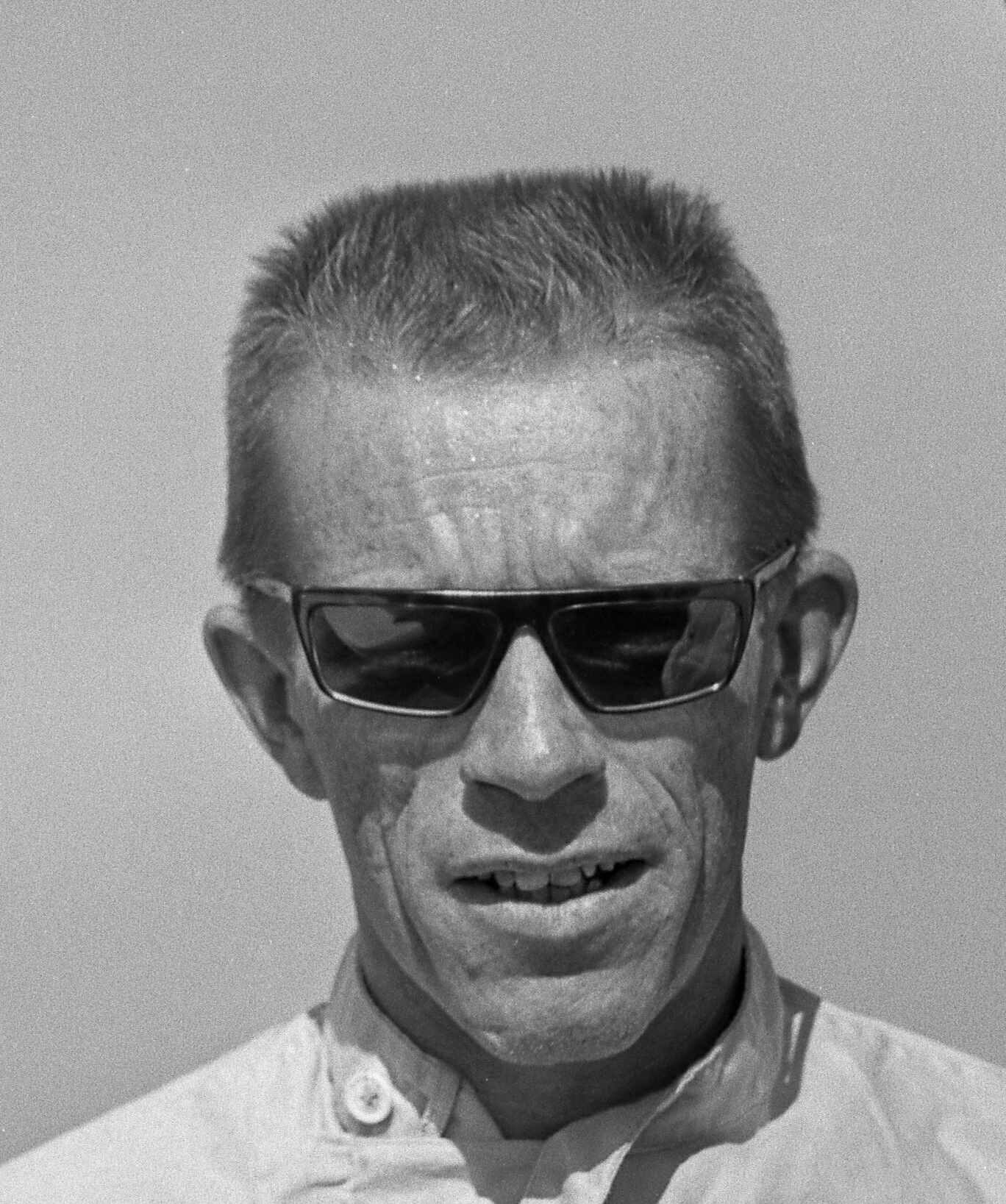
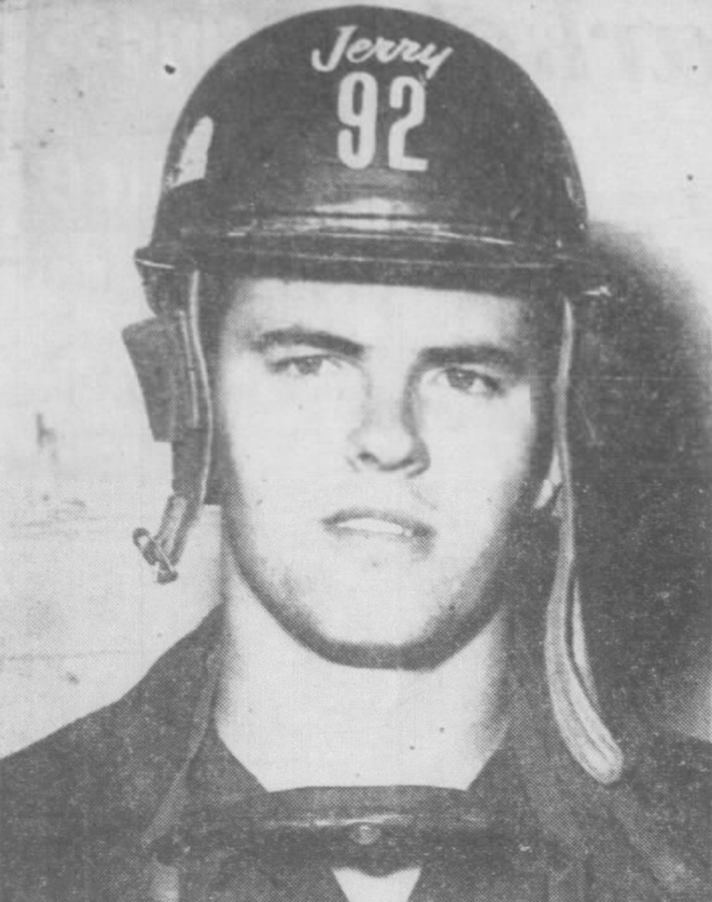
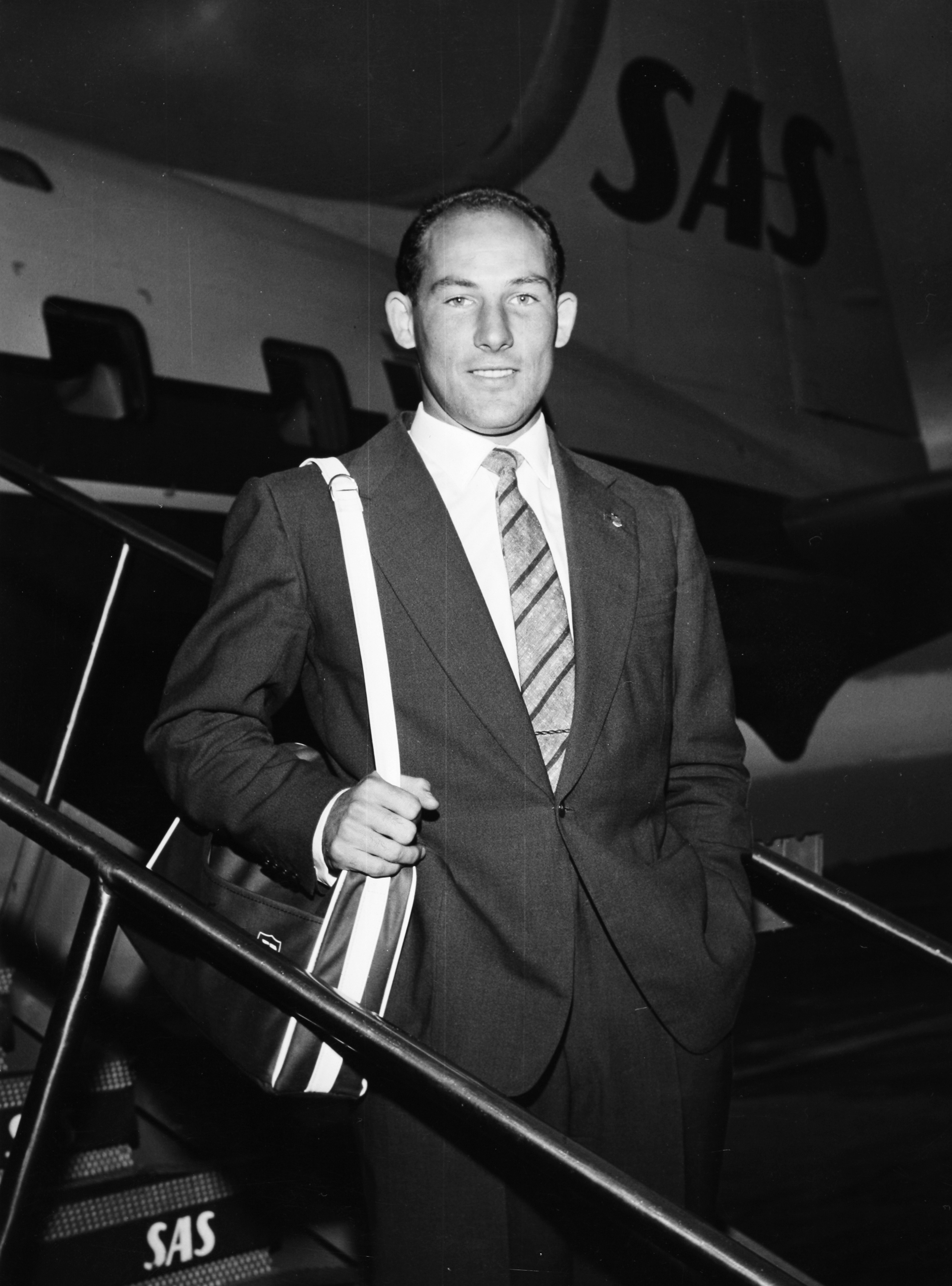
Richie Ginther (left), Jerry Unser Jr. (middle), and Stirling Moss (right) won the first feature race, the first stock car race, and the first Formula One race held at the facility, respectively.

Riverside International Motor Raceway opened as scheduled on September 21, 1957, with Chuck Daigh, Richie Ginther, and Ricardo Rodríguez winning the first events at the facility on the 21st and 22nd; Ginther won the first feature event held at the track. After the event, the sixth turn of the track, which was the scene of a fatal accident on the 22nd, was redesigned in time for events in November. The first drag racing event was held two weeks after the first event, hosting a National Hot Rod Association (NHRA) event on October 5–6. Two months later, the first stock car racing event was held, with Jerry Unser Jr. winning a United States Auto Club (USAC) event on December 1. In 1958, the first NASCAR-sanctioned race was held at the facility, with Eddie Gray winning a Grand National (now known as the Cup Series) event on June 1. The first Riverside-hosted event billed as the United States Grand Prix was held four months later, with Daigh winning a sports car race. In 1959, approximately $30,000 worth of renovations were made to the facility, adding 10,000 parking spots, access roads, a "greater paved area around the start-finish line", and improvements to other fan amenities. A year later, the first and only Formula One race hosted at Riverside was held on November 20, with Stirling Moss winning the event.

The facility quickly experienced financial issues. A highly advertised event consisting of three 500 mi (800 km) races over three days on the Memorial Day weekend of 1958 lost promoters $50,000 (adjusted for inflation, $557,958) and had a reported combined three-day attendance of 12,000, which was blamed on high ticket prices of $5 (adjusted for inflation, $56) per day. During the event, the facility was reportedly paying off creditors involved in the track's construction with ticket sales revenue from the event. Although the newly created Los Angeles Times Grand Prix, an annual professional sports car event first run in 1958, was considered a major success with high attendance starting in its first iteration, Wallen remarked that most of RIR's races were unprofitable, stating that "a few good races couldn't balance the books". He further stated that despite Edgar's funding "between $200,000 and $250,000" for the track by 1960, "even that couldn't stem the red ink".

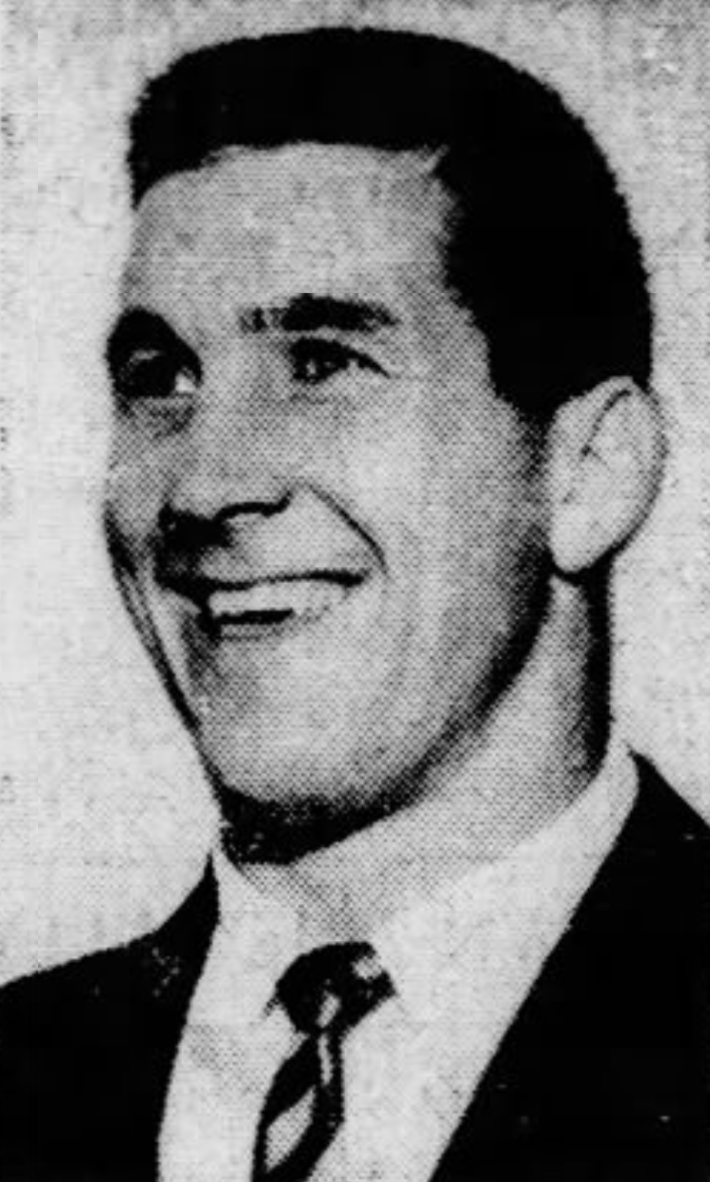
Les Richter (pictured in 1967) was hired by Riverside International Raceway in 1961, becoming the president a year later. He remained as president until 1983.

In January 1960, the facility was sold at an undisclosed price to Dean Mears, an amateur sports car racer. The price was later listed as "about $300,000" according to Wallen. Mears' tenure was short; he soon after left and cut all ties with the facility, and by June 10, Roy G. Lewis was listed as the new owner of the facility according to the Los Angeles Mirror. On June 25, the first oval race was held on a 0.500 mi (0.805 km) layout which incorporated the ninth turn of Riverside's road course. The following month, Paul Schisser was appointed as general manager of the facility. With his appointment, Schisser stated hopes of expanding the facility to include a replica of the Indianapolis Motor Speedway alongside a shopping and housing area. In September 1960, Fred Levy and Edwin Pauley bought considerable amounts of stock of the facility. According to the Redwood City Tribune, the duo invested "about $1 million". Despite the investment, the facility was reported to still be in financial trouble. The only Formula One race ever ran at the facility, a highly advertised event promoted by Alec Ulmann, had an actual attendance of 25,000 according to the Los Angeles Times; Ulmann expected 100,000. The race, which was considered a financial failure, was moved after one iteration to Watkins Glen International for 1961. In February 1961, Schisser appointed former football player Les Richter as the assistant general manager of the track. According to Richter, he was hired to head the track after it experienced continued financial troubles.

==== Edwin Pauley, Fred Levy, Bob Hope, and Les Richter years ====
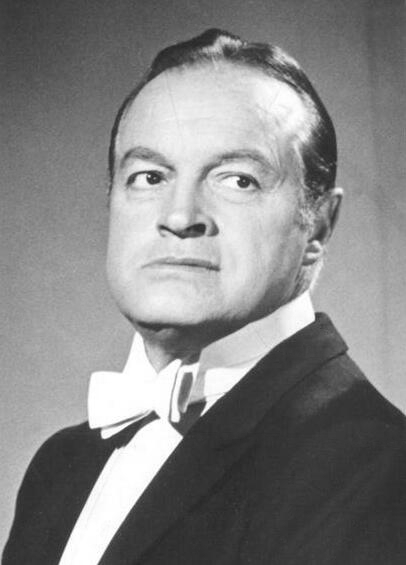
Bob Hope (pictured in 1969) was a co-owner of Riverside International Raceway from 1962 until 1969 alongside Edwin Pauley and Fred Levy.

In 1962, Lewis gave up his ownership in the facility, with ownership transferring to stockholders Edwin Pauley and Fred Levy. With the ownership, they brought entertainer Bob Hope as part of the ownership group of the track. In addition, Schisser retired as president of the track; as a result, Joe W. Perry was appointed as his replacement, and Richter was promoted to become the executive director of the track. In June of that year, a second, shorter layout was created after a short-cut straight was paved that connected the sixth and eighth turns, bypassing the entire seventh turn. Four months later, a $25,000 pedestrian bridge was constructed over the facility's backstretch and grandstand capacity was increased to 16,000, adding grandstands in the sixth turn and in an area "opposite [of] turn 7". In January 1963, the track's pit areas was relocated from outside of the track to the infield of the track, with grandstands being built in the old pit area. According to Wallen, the change was made due to the arrival of annual NASCAR racing in 1963. In May, a $24,000 retaining steel wall was installed at the ninth turn alongside the announcement of new garage amenities; the steel wall was installed in the wake of two deaths within the span of four months at the same turn in similar fashions.

In August 1963, Perry resigned as president of RIR, with Richter retaining his position as executive director and general manager. In January 1964, a $9 million master plan for RIR was revealed by Richter, which included plans to construct facilities to hold a capacity of up to 150,000, an automotive museum, a hotel, a golf course, and a gun club. Within the year, the track's dragstrip was revamped, with 18,000 grandstand seats being installed on the track's straightaway and a paved pit area within the track's infield being constructed in time for that year's Hot Rod Magazine Drag Races in June. In 1966, a $200,000 renovation project was completed, which included the construction of two permanent garage buildings and a retaining wall at the track's frontstretch. Several additions were made in 1967 in time for that year's Los Angeles Times Grand Prix: the first turn was widened by 70 ft (21 m), a concrete wall from the first turn to the sixth turn was installed, and other fan amenities were constructed at a cost of $300,000. In 1968, with construction impending on the nearby Ontario Motor Speedway oval track, Richter announced plans to construct a 1.5 mi (2.4 km) tri-oval with a budget of $3,600,000 and a planned capacity of 30,000; however, the plans were suspended by May 1969.

==== Early fatalities ====
RIR oversaw numerous fatalities in its early years, with most occurring in the 1960s. The track's first fatality occurred on September 22, 1957, with sports car racer John Lawrence dying after crashing at the track's sixth turn during a production car race, dying due to brain damage. On April 3, 1960, racer Pedro Von Dory died after crashing at the track's fifth turn during a sports car race, with Dory dying after being thrown out of the car and sustaining a broken back and a fractured skull. Three months later, Leslie Howard Brokin died after crashing into a guardrail during a sports car training session on July 24. On August 27, 1961, drag racer Bruce Johnson died after crashing during a time trial race on the track's dragstrip. Two deaths occurred in 1962. Sports car racer Peter Hessler died on March 11 after crashing a Lotus junior formula car during a test session, and Pat Piggott died on October 14 during that year's Los Angeles Times Grand Prix after suffering a suspension failure and subsequently crashing into the guardrail at the track's ninth turn in a "flying wedge impact". On February 2, 1963, Gordon Stuart Dane died in a crash described by Wallen as "a virtual replay of Pat Piggott's fatal crash", dying from internal injuries. Three deaths occurred in 1964. On January 19, stock car racing driver Joe Weatherly died after crashing at the track's sixth turn during the 1964 Motor Trend 500, dying from head injuries when his head hit a retaining wall during the impact; Weatherly was not wearing a harness belt nor did his car have a window net when the accident occurred. Ten months later, George Koehne Jr. crashed in a fiery accident on October 11 during a practice session for that year's Los Angeles Times Grand Prix, dying from his burn injuries almost two months later on December 4. A month after Koehne's crash, Jim Ladd Jr. died in a crash on November 15 at the track's first turn, dying from head injuries.

On January 17, 1965, spectator Ronald Pickle was killed in what was described as a "freak accident" by Wallen. Pickle alongside several spectators were watching the 1965 Motor Trend 500 on a forklift placed on a hill. The forklift fell and tumbled down the hill after fans on the forklift noticed the spinning car of Dick Powell, turning to see the accident and subsequently causing a weight shift. Pickle was crushed and killed by the tumbling forklift. On August 17, 1966, sports car driver Ken Miles died in a crash at the track's ninth turn after his car "turned right while braking... and veered down the ten-foot embankment" of the track's infield at around 175 mph (282 km/h). Miles was thrown out of the car during the accident and died instantly. Four months after Miles' death, motorcycle racer Viktor Scheiermann died after a crash at the track's first turn on December 11, with his head hitting the retaining guardrail. Scheiermann died due to head injuries a day later. On January 20, 1967, Billy Foster died in a crash at the track's ninth turn during a practice session for the 1967 Motor Trend 500; like Weatherly's crash, Foster's car lost brakes and crashed into the retaining wall, with Foster's head hitting the wall and subsequently dying instantly. On April 27, 1968, amateur racing driver Vic Tandy died after crashing at the fourth turn, flipping several times with Tandy being partially thrown out of the car after a car door came loose.

=== Brief American Raceways tenure ===
In 1969, RIR's layout was changed to its final iteration (shown in black). The previous layout of the track is shown in red.

In February 1969, Michigan International Speedway owner Lawrence LoPatin bought 47% interest in RIR for $1,200,000 (adjusted for inflation, $10,535,390), with an option to buy up to 65.5%. With LoPatin's investment, track officials announced plans for numerous renovations, and Richter was appointed as president at four LoPatin-owned tracks. LoPatin, who merged with the Atlanta International Raceway (now known as the Atlanta Motor Speedway) prior to his investment in RIR, eventually formed American Raceways, Inc. (ARI), announcing plans to build the Texas International Speedway and a track in Burlington County, New Jersey. In April, plans were announced to reconfigure RIR's ninth turn, which had been the site of numerous fatalities since the track's opening. In addition, the southern part of the track, which included turn nine, was affected due to construction of the California State Water Project, with a pipe across the track being constructed. Several facility improvements were announced soon after, including the construction of permanent grandstands at various parts of the track, expansion of the paddock parking area, the smoothing of hills and ditches that obstructed spectators' views, and the moving of the track's control tower from the start-finish line to the second turn of the track. The renovation project was done by September. The new turn nine, which featured a left-turn kink "about 1,000 ft (300 m)" from the backstretch bridge that led into a banked and wider right-turn sweeper, changed the length Grand Prix layout of the track from 3.275 to 3.300 mi (5.271 to 5.311 km).

Soon after their investment in RIR, ARI experienced major financial and organizational troubles in its ventures. In addition, the organization had multiple disputes with various sanctioning bodies, including the United States Auto Club (USAC), NASCAR, and the Sports Car Club of America (SCCA) over numerous issues. Richter left ARI in October; however, he opted to remain in his position as president of RIR. In December, Richter entered a battle with LoPatin over the control of the track. On the 19th, ARI and LoPatin filed a lawsuit against Richter in efforts of obtaining controlling interest of RIR. At the time, ARI owned 48.4% of RIR, with LoPatin threatening the firing of Richter if he was able to gain controlling interest of the track. The Sacramento Union's Jack Woodard later remarked that with the lawsuit, "LoPatin got almost everybody who is anybody in racing mad at him". In January 1970, after amassing $15,000,000 (adjusted for inflation, $124,357,326) in debt, ARI merged with the STP Corporation. Throughout the first half of 1970, ARI faced additional financial troubles due to low attendance from its racetracks. In addition, LoPatin faced criticism for his handling of Atlanta International Raceway, with Atlanta track officials leading campaigns to sack LoPatin after several Atlanta track executives either left or were fired by him. LoPatin was fired from his position as chairman of ARI on July 30, 1970, with Richter named as the president of ARI soon after. With LoPatin's ouster, The Daily Report's Deke Houlgate remarked that monies previously not available due to the lawsuit were freed, with the track now being freely able to compete with the Ontario Motor Speedway.

=== Fritz Duda era ===
In January 1971, a group of investors known as Sunnymead Land Investors, headed by Fritz Duda and consisting of Duda, William Norris, William Austin, and David Logan, purchased 80% controlling interest of RIR for approximately $400,000 (adjusted for inflation, $3,179,951), with Richter retaining his role as president. According to the autobiography of then-NASCAR executive Ken Clapp, who was heavily involved with racing on the American West Coast and RIR, with Duda's purchase, "the good news was that he liked racing, so we figured that Riverside would hang in there for a while". However, Duda, who was a real estate investor, "knew a sweet deal when he saw one, and, given the soaring land valuations in the area [around Riverside], it was only a matter of time before the right offer crossed his desk". In 1977, new concrete washboard curbs were installed in seven of the track's turns to deter short-cutting the track and approximately 300 ft (91 m) of concrete barrier was added at the exit of the ninth turn; the project costed approximately $100,000.

==== Les Richter departure, failed track replacement ====
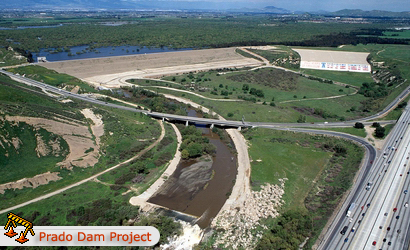
Numerous plans to build a replacement track for Riverside International Raceway were proposed in the 1980s. A location near the Prado Dam (pictured above) was considered by track officials; however, it was dropped in 1985.

The first rumors of Richter's potential departure as president of RIR were published on June 9, 1983, by the Los Angeles Times. The Times' rumor was confirmed on June 15, with Richter stating his reasoning was because of "philosophical differences" with the handling of the track compared to Duda. At around this time, rumors of the track's potential closure were published in local Californian newspapers. In February 1984, plans were announced to build a new track within three years at an undetermined site in the Southern California area to replace RIR due to urban residential expansion around RIR that would force the track's closure and demolition. According to the announcement, the proposed complex included a 1.500 to 2.000 mi (2.414 to 3.219 km) superspeedway oval, a road course, and a dragstrip. In the following months, locations in Rialto, Sunnymead-Edgemont, and the Glen Helen Regional Park were considered. By late August, San Bernardino Sun writer Bill Rogers remarked that the battle for the location of the potential complex had "not only brought San Bernardino and Riverside counties into conflict but also has unleashed pressures from throughout Southern California for developing new tracks now that auto racing has been almost completely phased out of the urban jungles of Los Angeles and Orange counties". Although the Glen Helen area was well-received for its weather patterns, lack of noise pollution, and highway access, track officials in October stated that they selected a regional park site for the replacement complex. On October 5, RIR track officials announced in a press conference plans to build the track near the Prado Dam in Corona, with plans to open the facility in early 1987.

On October 22, 1984, vice president of corporate relations for the 1984 Summer Olympics, Daniel D. Greenwood, was appointed as RIR's president, replacing Richter. With the appointment, the track lost almost all of its older management team led by Richter, with the exception of "the medical safety director... and the chief track announcer". In June 1985, Greenwood announced plans to continue operations at RIR until the end of the 1986 season, stating that the track's management was now considering five potential sites to move the track. Within the month, the Prado Dam plan came under heavy doubt due to the proposed area being a migratory area for the least Bell's vireo, an endangered species of bird in Southern California. In addition, the area was in an indigenous American burial site. Negotiations for the Prado Dam proposal stopped late in the month, effectively killing the proposal. By July, San Bernardino County Regional Parks Department director Gary Patton, who was involved with the Glen Helen proposal to build a track, stated to the San Bernardino Sun that "it's my opinion that the Riverside people do not intend to build a race track anywhere", noting the lack of RIR support for the Glen Helen proposal. In addition, writer Katie Castador wrote accusations from racing insiders that the replacement track proposal was a "smoke screen" to not make racing partners "uneasy about their future in Southern California". In August 1986, Greenwood stated possibilities of keeping the track open until June 1987 due to delays in finding a location for the replacement track; it was officially extended in November. The track's closure was later pushed back to June 1988 by October 1987. In June 1988, the Glen Helen proposal was scrapped, now being replaced by a housing development plan. By this point, Duda stated that he had "no prospects" of building a replacement track "in the near future".

==== Final events ====
Although delayed several times, by January 1988, Los Angeles Times writer Shav Glick wrote that "the signs are strong" of the track's impending shutdown in 1988 due to its traditional NASCAR Cup Series race in November being moved to Phoenix International Raceway (now known as Phoenix Raceway). For its final season, the track scheduled three major events, which included a doubleheader International Race of Champions (IROC) and NASCAR Cup Series weekend in June alongside a SCORE International event in August. The IROC and NASCAR races were won by Scott Pruett and Rusty Wallace on June 11 and 12, respectively. The final SCORE International event was run on August 14, with Robby Gordon winning the final off-road event of the weekend. By the time of the event weekend, demolition of the track started.

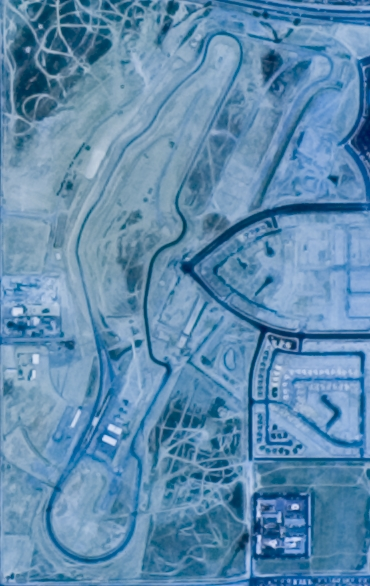
Riverside International Raceway in 1989. During the year, races sanctioned by the California Sports Car Club were held on the southern portion of the track.

Construction of the mall, now-named as the TownGate Mall (currently known as the Moreno Valley Mall), was delayed due to a financial recession and a subsequent lack of tenants. As a result, both the Skip Barber Racing School and the California Sports Car Club became tenants of RIR, with Skip Barber hosting driving schools and the California Club hosting races. As demolition of the facility already started on the northern parts of RIR, the organizations used the southern portions of the track. The California Sports Car Club ran several events at the track, leading to their final event on the weekend of July 1–2, which was the last "true" final event ran at RIR.

==== Demolition ====
Initial grading on the mall started in September 1989. Two months later, a housing development built on the track's backstretch opened, with Los Angeles Times writer Shav Glick proclaiming that the development would "shut the doors for good". In August 1990, the Goodyear Tower, RIR's observation tower, was toppled. By March 1992, the project expanded to include housing developments, parks, schools, and offices. The Moreno Valley Mall formally opened on October 14, 1992. As of 2020, the former RIR complex consists of the Moreno Valley Mall, a Lowe's store, a Costco store, hotels, restaurants, and housing developments.

==== 1970s and 1980s fatalities ====
Up until the track's final event, RIR experienced several fatalities in the 1970s and 1980s. On April 24, 1971, racer Mel Andrus crashed at the first turn during a Formula A qualifying session, dying an hour later in surgery. In 1974, sports car racer Frank Davis died on March 17 after suffering a heart attack on a straightaway and subsequently crashing into a brick wall. Two deaths occurred in 1975. On January 18, NASCAR driver Bill Spencer died in a crash during a NASCAR Late Model Sportsman race, losing brakes and crashing at the sixth turn and dying due to "multiple chest injuries". Four months after, motorcycle rider Marvin LaBlanc died during an off-road motorcycle event after crashing and being hit by another racer during the crash. On September 19, 1976, sports car racer Dave Miller died in a Sports Car Club of America (SCCA) race after losing brakes on the backstretch and crashing into the turn nine wall, dying instantly. On May 15, 1977, United States Navy member W. F. Bogard died in a crash during a motorcycle race, dying from a broken neck. On January 15, 1978, during a practice session for a NASCAR Late Model Sportsman Division race, driver Sonny Easley crashed on an escape road after losing control due to getting a wheel into a muddy area, leading him to slide sideways and collide with a trailer connected to a truck, which subsequently pushed the truck into a van. A crewman for Tiny Keith, Douglas B. Gruntz, was killed after he was trapped between the truck and the van. Easley was also killed when he was hit by stray sheet metal from the crashed vehicles. On August 26, 1979, a group of six people on a pickup truck illegally broke into the track and crashed, killing passenger Douglas Brune.

Two deaths occurred in 1980. On January 12, NASCAR driver Tim Williamson died due to multiple chest injuries in a crash at the end of the track's esses section, crashing at approximately 100 mph (160 km/h) into a concrete barrier after one of the wheels of Williamson's car went off-track into a muddy section. On December 7, motorcycle racer John West died in a crash during a practice run for a motorcycle event; according to witnesses, West had been holding his chest before the accident. Three deaths occurred in 1983. On April 2, sports car racer Jim Harris died in a Sports Car Club of America (SCCA) Solo I race, crashing into another car and the hitting the turn one retaining wall. On April 24, endurance racing driver Rolf Stommelen died due to blunt force trauma in a crash during an IMSA GT Championship event, with his car lifting and crashing at the entrance of turn nine, proceeding to flip numerous times before landing and catching on fire. On October 16, racer John Goss died in a crash at the track's backstretch during a vintage-car racing event. On July 2, 1989, during the track's final event, Formula C driver Mark Verbofsky died in a crash; with the death, RIR experienced deaths on its first and last days of racing.

== Events and uses ==
=== Auto racing ===
==== NASCAR ====
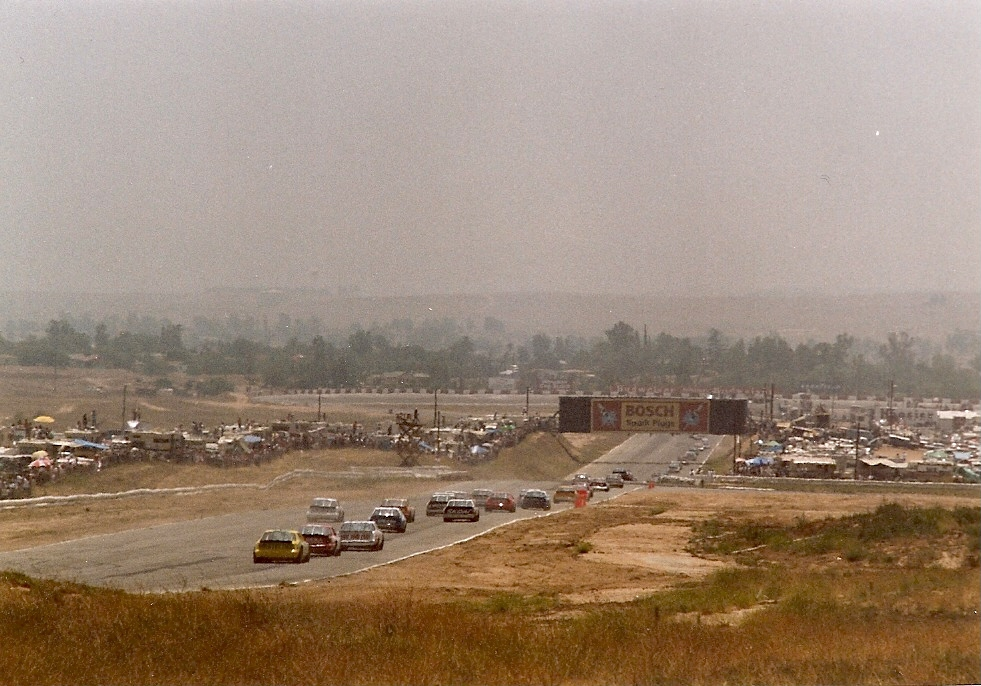
A photo of Riverside International Raceway's straightaway during the NASCAR-sanctioned 1988 Budweiser 400. From 1963 until 1988, the NASCAR Cup Series raced at the track annually.

From 1963 until 1988, RIR held at least one annual NASCAR race. From 1963 until 1969, RIR ran one annual NASCAR race in January. In 1970, a second annual NASCAR Cup Series race was added to RIR's schedule, taking place in June. In 1981, RIR held a one-off Cup Series race in November after the closure of the Ontario Motor Speedway the year prior, running three Cup Series races in one year. After 1981, RIR's January race was moved to November, remaining on the schedule until 1987 when the race was moved to Phoenix Raceway. RIR also held one-off NASCAR Cup Series races in 1958 and 1961, with the latter being a race that permitted sports cars.

==== Open-wheel racing ====
In 1960, RIR hosted the United States Grand Prix, which was part of that year's Formula One World Championship. Another Formula One race was announced in August 1966 and scheduled for November 26, 1967; however, in March 1967, the race was swapped in favor of a USAC Championship Car event, with then-general manager Les Richter stating that a Formula One race was an "expensive race to promote". An annual open-wheel race was run under the sanction of USAC from 1967 until 1969; a race was scheduled for 1970, but was scrapped.

In 1972, plans were made for RIR to host the Formula One-sanctioned United States Grand Prix West on April 7. However, the plans were dropped in February of that year due to a lack of sponsorship for the race. In 1981, after the closure of the Ontario Motor Speedway the year prior, Championship Auto Racing Teams (CART) moved their annual race in Ontario to RIR. CART ran annual races at the track until 1983, when it was dropped from the 1984 CART season.

==== Sports car racing ====
Throughout most of the track's history, RIR hosted the Los Angeles Times Grand Prix, a professional sports car event that ran under various sanctioning bodies over RIR's existence. The race ran its first iteration in 1958, and ran annually until 1973, when it was dropped the following year after the Los Angeles Times, the title sponsor of the race, pulled its sponsorship. From 1966 until 1973, the race ran under the sanction of Can–Am. The event came back in 1979 under the sanction of IMSA GT Championship, running until 1987.

==== Off-road racing ====
SCORE International held its first event at RIR in 1973, racing on an off-road circuit of the track that used the "gullies and hills adjacent to the track" alongside portions of the actual RIR track. The sanctioning body continued hosting at the facility annually until the track's closure in 1988.

==== Other racing events ====
RIR hosted numerous racing series throughout its existence, including the American Motorcyclist Association, Formula Atlantic, the International Race of Champions (IROC), the Trans-Am Series, and the World Sportscar Championship.

=== Other events and uses ===
==== Filming production ====
Riverside International Raceway was used as a location for numerous films. The facility was used in the filming of On the Beach (1959), Viva Las Vegas (1964), The Killers (1964), Red Line 7000 (1965), Fireball 500 (1966), Grand Prix (1966), The Love Bug (1968), Winning (1969), Stacey (1973), and The Betsy (1978). In addition, the track also served as a location for several television series, including Route 66, Where the Action Is, The F.B.I., CHiPs, The Rockford Files, Knight Rider, and Simon & Simon.

==== Miscellaneous events ====
- On April 22, 1978, RIR held the Giant Country Spring Festival, a one-day country music festival that had an estimated crowd of 5,000. According to The San Bernardino Sun, promoters expected a crowd of 60,000.

== Race lap records ==
The fastest official race lap records at Riverside International Raceway for different classes are listed as:

Category	Time	Driver	Vehicle	Event
Long Grand Prix Road Course (with Dogleg) (1969–1989): 3.300 mi (5.311 km)
CART	1:30.656	Kevin Cogan	Penske PC-10	1982 Budweiser 500K
Group 7	1:34.030	George Follmer	Porsche 917/10 TC	1972 Riverside Can-Am round
IMSA GTP	1:35.610	John Paul Jr.	March 85G	1986 Los Angeles Times/Ford Grand Prix of Endurance Riverside
IMSA GTX	1:40.710	John Paul Jr.	Porsche 935 JLP-3	1981 Los Angeles Times/Toyota Grand Prix of Endurance Riverside
Formula Atlantic	1:41.350	John David Briggs	Ralt RT-4	1983 Riverside Formula Atlantic round
IMSA GTO	1:44.701	Wally Dallenbach Jr.	Ford Mustang	1985 Los Angeles Times/Nissan Grand Prix
IMSA GTP Lights	1:47.507	Kelly Marsh	Argo JM16	1985 Los Angeles Times/Nissan Grand Prix
IMSA GTU	1:51.850	Elliot Forbes-Robinson	Porsche 924 Carrera	1984 Los Angeles Times/Nissan Grand Prix
Sports Car Short Course (1969–1989): 2.541 mi (4.090 km)
Can-Am	1:11.079	Michael Roe	VDS-004	1984 Riverside Can-Am round
F5000	1:12.922	Jackie Oliver	Shadow DN6B	1976 Riverside F5000 round
IMSA GTP	1:13.080	Sarel van der Merwe	Chevrolet Corvette GTP	1987 Los Angeles Times Grand Prix
Trans-Am	1:19.880	Bobby Allison	Datsun 510	1972 Riverside Trans-Am round
IMSA GTP Lights	1:21.270	Jeff Kline	Spice Pontiac Fiero GTP	1987 Los Angeles Times Grand Prix
IMSA GTO	1:22.200	Chris Cord	Toyota Celica Turbo	1987 Riverside 300 Kilometers
IMSA GTU	1:28.660	Tom Kendall	Mazda RX-7	1987 Riverside 300 Kilometers
Short Oval Circuit (1960–1988): 0.500 mi (0.805 km)
Sports car	0:27.700	Art Snyder	Lola Mk1	1961 Riverside Sports Car race
Original Grand Prix Road Course (without Dogleg) (1957–1968): 3.250 mi (5.230 km)
Can-Am	1:40.400	Bruce McLaren	McLaren M6A	1967 Los Angeles Times Grand Prix
Formula One	1:56.300	Jack Brabham	Cooper T53	1960 United States Grand Prix
Group 4 sports car	2:01.000	Bruce McLaren	Cooper T57 Monaco	1961 United States Grand Prix for Sports Cars
Sports Car Short Course (1957–1968): 2.595 mi (4.176 km)
Group 7 (Can-Am)	1:20.000	Mark Donohue	McLaren M6A	1968 Riverside USRRC round
Group 4	1:26.400	Mark Donohue	Lola T70 Mk.II	1967 Riverside 300
Sports car	1:26.800	Bruce McLaren	McLaren Elva MkII	1965 Los Angeles Times Grand Prix
Group 3	1:36.500	Ed Leslie	Shelby Cobra	1965 Riverside USRRC round

== See also ==
- Riverside International Automotive Museum
