= Green Valley Raceway =

Former motorsports race track in Smithfield, Texas

The Valley The Track that Milk Built
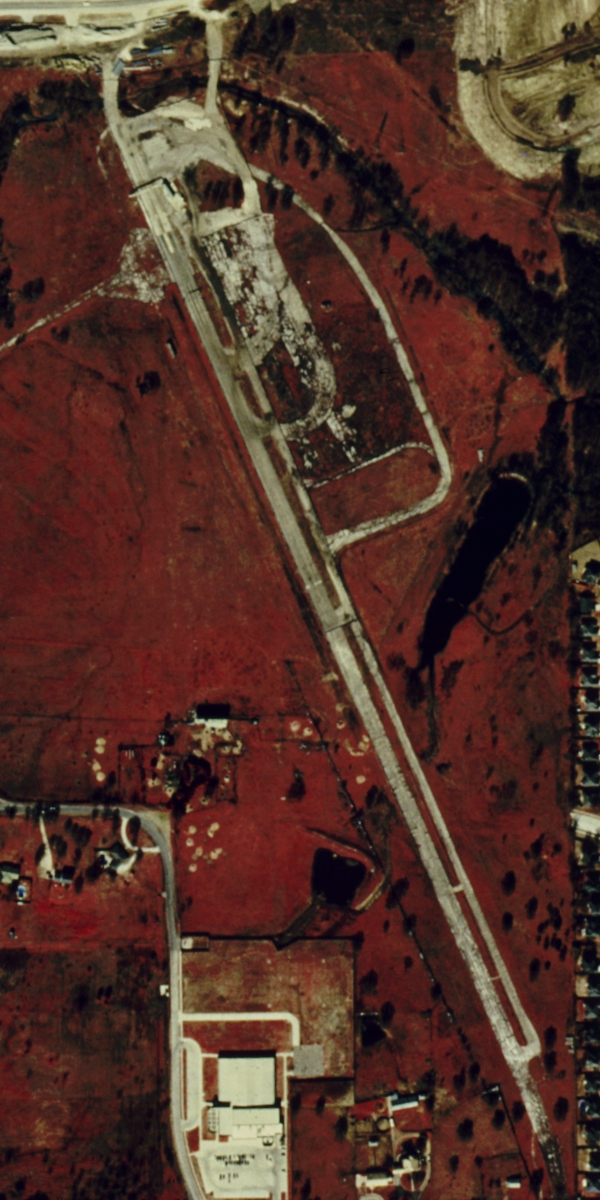
- 1995 infrared aerial photo
- Coordinates: 32°53′48″N 97°12′37″W
- Owner: Bill McClure (founder); Bill Hielscher (race coordinator)
- Opened: 1960
- Closed: 1986
- Major events: Road course: Trans-Am Series (1966–1967, 1984); Can-Am (1984); Drag strip: NHRA; AHRA
- Website: nrhgreenvalleyraceway.com

Road Course (1966–1986)
- Surface: Asphalt
- Length: 2.100 mi (3.380 km)
- Turns: 8
- Race lap record: 0:59.204 ( (Republic of Ireland) Michael Roe, VDS-002, 1984, Can-Am)

Original Road Course (1960–1965)
- Surface: Asphalt
- Length: 1.600 mi (2.575 km)
- Race lap record: 1:13.900 ( (United States) Jim Hall, Porsche 718 RSK, 1961, Sports car racing)

Green Valley Raceway was a motorsports race track located in Smithfield, Texas, and was part of the Dallas–Fort Worth metroplex. Designed and built by Bill McClure on his North Texas dairy farm, the facility opened in 1960, and was used for over 20 years until its closure in 1986.

It had its 1st full season in 1961, whereby it drew 125,000 spectators.

== Track description and history ==
Green Valley Raceway was a 1.600 mi (2.575 km) permanent road course, whilst the start-finish straight was also used as a drag strip. In 1966, the original layout was changed to 2.100 mi (3.380 km). The road course was used for Trans-Am Series races, SCCA races, and it also held a Can-Am race in 1984. The drag strip was used for NHRA and AHRA-sanctioned events. In 1974, Evel Knievel used the circuit for one of his stunt performances. The track has since been demolished, and is now a site for housing developments. Green Valley Elementary School is also located where the track once was and the school uses a perfect attendance trophy made from a piece of the demolished race track.

== Lap records ==
The fastest official race lap records at Green Valley Raceway are listed as:

Category	Time	Driver	Vehicle	Event
Road Course (1966–1986): 2.100 mi (3.380 km)
Can-Am	0:59.204	Michael Roe	VDS-002	1984 Dallas Grand Prix Presents The Texas Challenge at Green Vallery Raceway
Trans-Am	1:03.539	Willy T. Ribbs	Mercury Capri	1984 Dallas Grand Prix Presents The Texas Challenge at Green Valley Raceway
Group 2	1:11.000	Dick Thompson	Ford Mustang	1967 Green Valley 300
Original Road Course (1960–1965): 1.600 mi (2.575 km)
Sports car racing	1:13.900	Jim Hall	Porsche 718 RSK	1961 SCCA Regional Green Valley
