= VDS-003 =

American sports prototype racing cars

The VDS-003 was an American closed-wheel sports prototype, designed, developed and built by Racing Team VDS, for the Can-Am series, in 1983. It had only one sports car racing outing; the 1983 Lime Rock Park Can-Am round. It was driven by Phil Compton for Norwood-Walker Racing, but was involved in an accident during the practice session for the race. Therefore, it started in last place, and did not start the race. It was later decided to retire the car, and replace it with the much more successful 002, in which driver Michael Roe the championship in the next year. Just like its predecessors, it was powered by a Chevrolet small-block motor.
