= VDS-004 =

American sports prototype racing cars

- Category: Can-Am
- Constructor: Racing Team VDS
- Predecessor: VDS-002; VDS-003 (one race)

Technical specifications
- Engine: Chevrolet 5,000 cc (305.1 cu in) V8 engine naturally-aspirated mid-engined
- Transmission: 5-speed manual
- Power: 550 hp (410 kW)
- Weight: 1,550–1,800 lb (703.1–816.5 kg)

Competition history
- Notable entrants: Dallas Motorsports Inc.
- Notable drivers: Michael Roe
- Debut: 1984 Can-Am Road Atlanta
| Races | Wins |
|---|---|
| 6 | 2 |
- Drivers' Championships: 1: (1984 Can-Am)

The VDS-004 was an American closed-wheel sports prototype race car, designed, developed, and built by Racing Team VDS for the revived Can-Am series, in 1984, and was their last Can-Am car design, and the last one built by VDS. It debuted at the fifth race of the 1984 season, at Road Atlanta. Michael Roe won the 1984 Can-Am Championship outright in the car, and together with the VDS-002, won a total of 7 of the 10 races that season. As with most Can-Am cars of the time, it was powered by the commonly used 5.0 L (310 cu in) Chevrolet small-block motor.
