= Culture of Dallas =

Dallas is a city in Texas, United States.

== People and politics ==
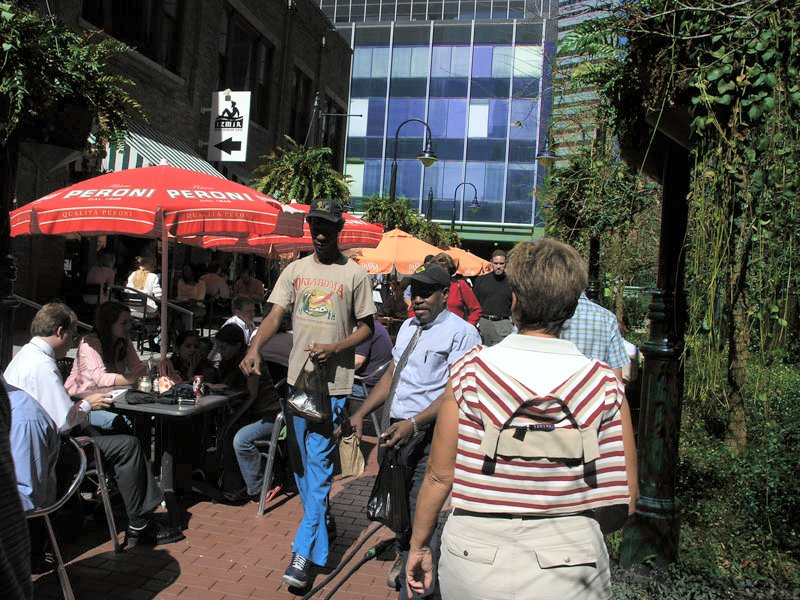
Pedestrians in downtown.

The city has historically been predominantly white but its population diversified as it grew in size and importance over the 20th century. The largest ethnic minority group in the city are Hispanics—Dallas is a major destination for Mexican immigrants seeking opportunity in the United States because it is relatively close, along with the rest of Texas, to the U.S.–Mexico border. In addition to the New Great Migration, since around 2010, many African Americans have been moving to Dallas for its affordable cost of living and job opportunities. The southwest area of the city, especially Oak Cliff, is predominantly or completely Hispanic. The southern areas of the city, especially Pleasant Grove and South Dallas, are predominantly or completely Black. The eastern parts of the city are mostly white and the northwestern portion of the city is home to a fairly equal mix of Hispanics and Blacks. The city also contains localized populations of Chinese, Taiwanese, Korean, Thai, Indian, German, Middle Eastern, Polish, Russian and Jewish peoples. The Asian communities tend to reside in the northern Dallas suburbs such as Plano, Irving, Carrollton, and Richardson.

== Cuisine ==
Dallas is renowned for barbecue, authentic Mexican and Tex-Mex cuisine. The Dallas area is home to large numbers of restaurants featuring cuisines from all over the world. Suburbs such as Plano, Irving, Carrollton, Richardson, and Arlington feature authentic Indian, Chinese, Korean, Vietnamese, African Cuisines, Pakistani, Taiwanese, and Persian Cuisine. Famous products of the Dallas culinary scene include El Fenix, Mi Cocina, the Mansion on Turtle Creek, and the frozen margarita. On average, Dallasites eat out about four times every week, which is the third highest rate in the state, behind only Houston and Austin.

== Arts ==
Dallas is the center of the North Texas region's art scene. Some areas known especially for the local art and culture include:

The Arts District of downtown is home to several arts venues, both existing and proposed. Notable venues in the district include the Dallas Museum of Art, the Morton H. Meyerson Symphony Center, The Trammell & Margaret Crow Collection of Asian Art and the Nasher Sculpture Center. In 2009, the AT&T Performing Arts Center was completed, which includes the Margot and Bill Winspear Opera House, the Dee and Charles Wyly Theatre, the Annette Strauss Artists Square, and the Elaine D. and Charles A. Sammons Park. Construction of the City Performance Hall was scheduled for completion in September 2012. The Arts District is also home to Dallas Independent School District's Booker T. Washington High School for the Performing and Visual Arts.

The Majestic Theatre is a historic theater in the City Center District that has been restored for use as a performing arts facility.

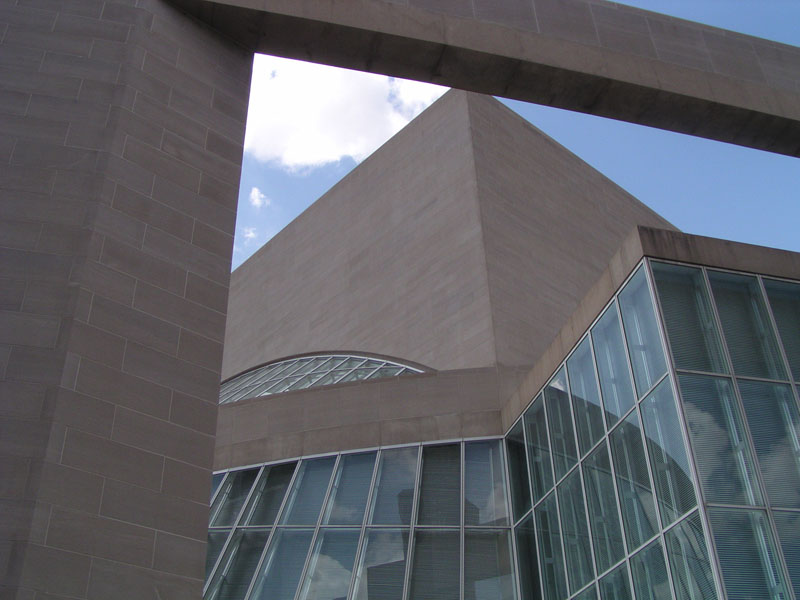
The Morton H. Meyerson Symphony Center in the Arts District.

Deep Ellum originally became popular during the 1920s and 1930s as the prime jazz and blues hotspot in the south. Artists such as Blind Lemon Jefferson, Robert Johnson, Huddie "Lead Belly" Ledbetter, and Bessie Smith played in original Deep Ellum clubs like The Harlem and The Palace. Today, Deep Ellum is home to hundreds of artists who live in lofts and operate in studios throughout the district alongside bars, pubs, and concert venues. One major art infusion in the area is the city's lax stance on graffiti, and thus several public ways including tunnels, sides of buildings, sidewalks, and streets are covered in murals.

The Cedars is home to a growing population of studio artists and an expanding host of entertainment venues as well. The area's art scene began to grow in the early 2000s with the opening of Southside on Lamar, a Sears warehouse converted into lofts, studios, and retail. Current attractions include Gilley's Dallas and Poor David's Pub. Entrepreneur Mark Cuban purchased land in the area near Cedars Station, and locals speculate that he is planning an entertainment complex.

The Bishop Arts District in Oak Cliff is home to a growing number of studio artists living in converted warehouses. Walls of buildings along alleyways and streets are painted with murals and the surrounding district is home to many eclectic restaurants and shops.

== Media ==
Dallas has many local newspapers, magazines, television stations and radio stations that serve the Dallas/Fort Worth Metroplex as a whole, which is one of the largest media markets in the United States.

Dallas has a daily newspaper, The Dallas Morning News, which was founded in 1885 by A. H. Belo and is the company's flagship newspaper. The Dallas Times Herald, started in 1888, was the Morning News's major competitor until Belo purchased the paper on 8 December 1991 and closed the paper down the next day. A. H. Belo also publishes Al Día, a Spanish-language paper.

Other significant paper-publications include the Dallas Observer, an alternative weekly newspaper, and D Magazine, a monthly magazine about business, life, and entertainment in the metroplex.

The Dallas area has a station from every major television broadcasting network — KDFW 4 (FOX), KXAS 5 (NBC), WFAA 8 (ABC) (which for many years was owned by Belo Corporation alongside the Morning News), KTVT 11 (CBS), KERA 13 (PBS), KTXA-21 (IND), KUVN 23 (UNI), KDAF 33 (The CW) and KXTX 39 (TMD).

Dallas is served by a large number of radio stations. Because of the city's centrally located position and lack of nearby mountainous terrain, many high-strength antennae in the city have bands that can broadcast as far off as North Dakota and can be used as emergency broadcasting antennae when broadcasting is down in other major metropolitan areas in the United States.

The Texas Jewish Post serves the Jewish community of Dallas and Fort Worth, Texas.

== Religion ==
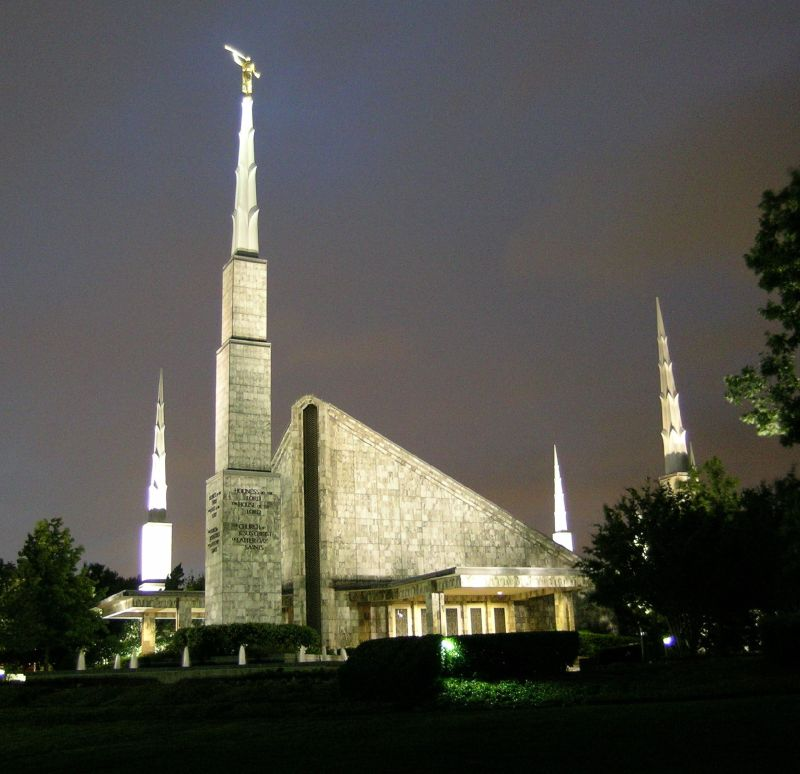
The Dallas Texas Temple of the Church of Jesus Christ of Latter-day Saints

There is a large Protestant Christian influence in the Dallas community and the city is deep within the Bible Belt. Methodist and Baptist churches are prominent in many neighborhoods and anchor the city's two major private universities. The Cathedral of Hope, an LGBT Protestant church, is the largest congregation of its kind in the world.

The Catholic church is also a significant organization in the community—it operates a major university in Irving and its Cathedral Santuario de Guadalupe in the Arts District oversees the second-largest membership in the United States. Dallas is also home to three Eastern Orthodox Christian churches.

The city is also home to a sizable LDS community. The Church of Jesus Christ of Latter-day Saints has fifteen stakes throughout Dallas and surrounding suburbs. The Church built the Dallas Texas Temple, the first temple in Texas, in the city in 1984.

Dallas has a large Jewish community, many of whom reside in eastern and northern Dallas. Temple Emanu-El, one of the largest synagogues in the South and Southwest, was founded in 1873. The community is led by Rabbi David E. Stern. See the History of the Jews in Dallas, Texas.

Dallas' most significant Muslim community lies in the city's northern and northeastern suburbs, and a strong Hindu community exists in Irving, Plano and other northwestern suburbs.

== Events ==
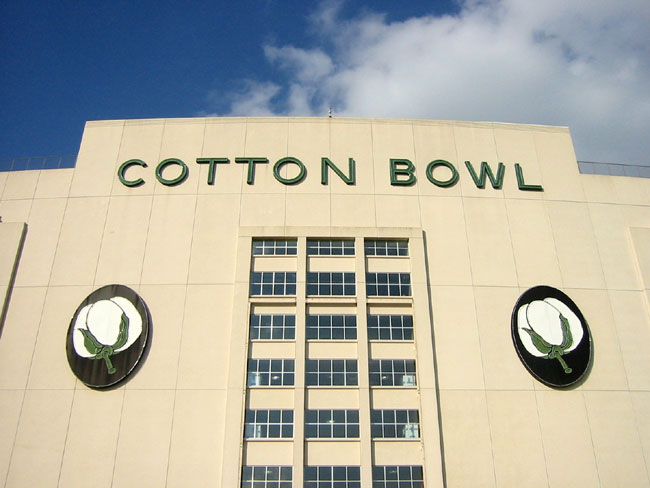
The Cotton Bowl main entrance

The most notable event held in Dallas is the State Fair of Texas, held annually at Fair Park since 1886. The fair is a massive event for the state of Texas and brings an estimated US$350 million to the city's economy annually. The Red River Showdown (UT-OU) game is held at the Cotton Bowl each year, during the fair's run.

Other festivals in the area include Cinco de Mayo festivities hosted by the city's large Mexican population, Saint Patrick's Day parades in Irish communities especially along east Dallas' Lower Greenville Avenue, Juneteenth festivities, the Greek Food Festival of Dallas, and an annual Halloween parade on Oak Lawn Avenue.

== Architecture ==
Most of the notable architecture in Dallas is modernist and postmodernist. Iconic examples of modernist architecture include I. M. Pei's Fountain Place, the Bank of America Plaza, Renaissance Tower, and Reunion Tower. Examples of postmodernist architecture include the JPMorgan Chase Tower and Comerica Bank Tower. Several smaller structures are fashioned in the Gothic Revival and neoclassical styles. One architectural "hotbed" in the city is a stretch of homes along Swiss Avenue, which contains all shades and variants of architecture from Victorian to neoclassical.
