= Fair Park =

- Texas Centennial Exposition Buildings (1936–1937)
- U.S. National Register of Historic Places
- U.S. National Historic Landmark District
- Texas State Antiquities Landmark
- Dallas Landmark Historic District
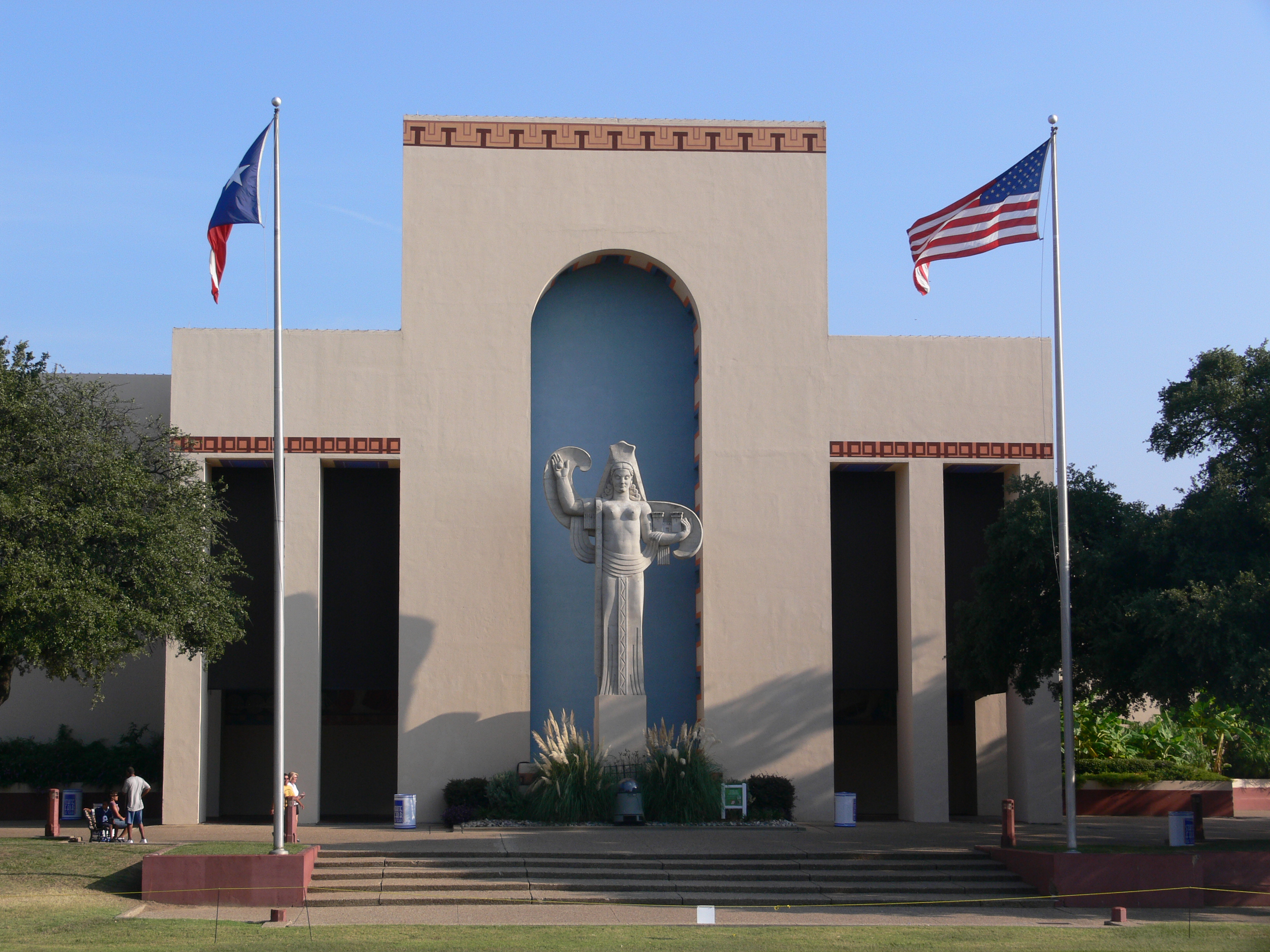
- Centennial Building in Fair Park

- Location within Texas Location within the United States
- Location: Bounded by Texas and Pacific RR, Pennsylvania, Second, and Parry Aves. Dallas, Texas, U.S.
- Coordinates: 32°46′55″N 96°45′56″W
- Area: 277 acres (112 ha)
- Built: 1936; 90 years ago
- Architect: George L. Dahl, et al.
- Architectural style: Art Deco
- Website: Fair Park, TX
- NRHP reference No.: 86003488
- TSAL No.: 8200005923
- DLMKHD No.: H/33

Significant dates
- Added to NRHP: September 24, 1986
- Designated NHLD: September 24, 1986
- Designated TSAL: January 1, 1984
- Designated DLMKHD: March 4, 1987

Fair Park is a recreational and educational complex in Dallas, Texas, United States, located immediately east of downtown. The 277-acre (112 ha) area is registered as a Dallas Landmark and National Historic Landmark; many of the buildings were constructed for the Texas Centennial Exposition in 1936.

Fair Park has been designated a Great Place in America by the American Planning Association.

== History ==
The site was established as an 80-acre (32 ha) fairground on the outskirts of East Dallas for the Dallas State Fair in 1886. After a fire and financial loss by the fair association in 1904, voters approved the "Reardon Plan". It became Dallas' second public park, known as "Fair Park".

An important figure in Fair Park's development was landscape architect and city planner George Kessler. In 1906, he was responsible for the first formal plan for the park influenced by the City Beautiful Movement. The City Beautiful Movement advocated well planned public spaces, tree-lined boulevards, monuments, public art, and fountains which would 'beautify' the city.

A milestone in Fair Park's history was 1936, when the Texas Centennial Exposition was held there. In preparation for the six-month event, the appearance of the park was dramatically altered by architect George Dahl and consulting architect Paul Cret. The park was transformed from an early 20th-century fairground into an Art Deco showcase. While many of the exposition's buildings were meant to be temporary, several have survived and have been restored to some extent. Over the years, the park was expanded to its current 277 acres (112 ha).

Fair Park was declared a National Historic Landmark in 1986 as one of the nation's largest surviving assemblages of buildings related to an exposition. Administration of the park was transferred to the Dallas Parks Department in 1988. Today, the cultural facilities and annual events attract an unsubstantiated estimate of 5 million visitors annually, the bulk of which attend during the 24-day State Fair of Texas.

=== Restoration and future ===
Many of the existing Art Deco buildings have been restored visually to their 1936 appearance and upgraded to modern building standards. In anticipation of the Dallas Area Rapid Transit (DART) light rail service expansion to the area, the historic Parry Avenue entrance gates were restored in 2009. The four cameo reliefs on Centennial Building underwent a professional conservation treatment in 2000 and the Esplanade fountain pylons and six monumental sculptures in 2004. Several sculptures were reconstructed and feature a dramatic light and water show.

In 2003, the Fair Park Comprehensive Development plan was produced by Hargreaves Associates. This comprehensive plan included recommendations for the physical site, park programs, activities, funding options, and management alternatives. The park received a $72 million city bond allocation in 2006 for repairs and improvements.

In September 2014, a blue ribbon task force appointed by Mayor Mike Rawlings submitted a report on the rejuvenation of Fair Park. The Mayor's Task Force plan envisioned a public-private partnership led by a non profit organization to be charged with over arching powers to control the revitalization of Fair Park, including the State Fair of Texas. Architect/City planner Antonio Di Mambro, with international experience in infrastructure planning and neighborhood revitalization, encouraged the Mayor to use the Task Force report as a building block for constructive dialogue with residents, stakeholders and the neighborhoods around Fair Park. Following the presentation of the Task Force Plan, Mayor Mike Rawlings said, "I felt passion by all the council and park board members that they want Fair Park to be all it can be and they're interested in taking this big challenge on".

In March 2015, the State Fair pushed back on any notion of tightening up the footprint of its current operation. Dallas Morning News reporter Robert Wilonsky called the State Fair's response "rather dramatic" The article also quoted Stephen Page of the closed Texas Museum of Automotive History from 2012 as saying, "The City's requirement that tenants vacate the majority of the buildings in Fair Park during the State Fair is the principal reason for Fair Park's ongoing decline." Wilonsky also quoted a 'prominent member of the Mayor's Task Force' as suggesting privately "that the State Fair's presence at Fair Park also needs to be greatly reduced."

On November 18, 2015, Dallas City Council considered Mayor Rawlings' proposal to turn over management of Fair Park to a non-profit corporation headed up by the "Father of DART" Walt Humann. Under the Mayor's plan, the city would still own the 277-acre site, but a non-profit foundation would manage the grounds and assets. In 2016 Mayor Mike Rawlings' proposal to turn the park over to a non-profit corporation headed by Humann was defeated by the Dallas City Attorney and a lack of support by Dallas City Council.

In October 2018, the Dallas City Council voted unanimously to approve a management contract with Fair Park First. According to the plan, Fair Park First would receive $35 million over 10 years and would implement plans to rejuvenate the park and surrounding community. At the time, some within the city parks board expressed concern that a contract between the non-profit Fair Park First and its for-profit subcontractor, Oak View Group, excluded the city from oversight of park operations. Following a whistleblower report in early 2024 about spending irregularities, a review by the city found that more than $5 million in donor-restricted funds had been improperly used for park operations.

== Cultural district ==
Many Dallas cultural institutions call Fair Park home.

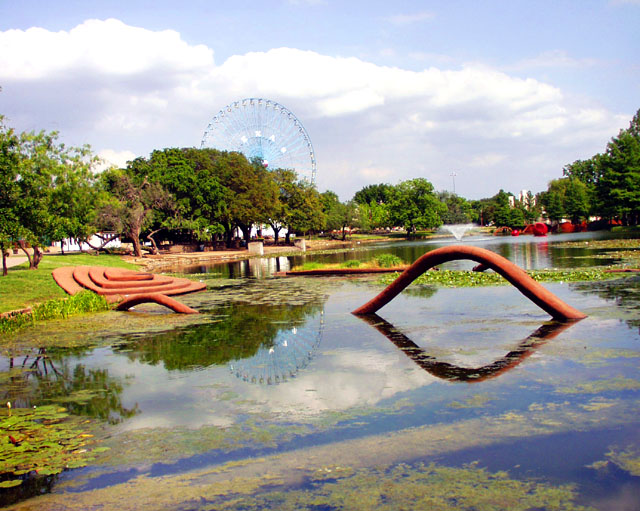
The Leonhardt Lagoon

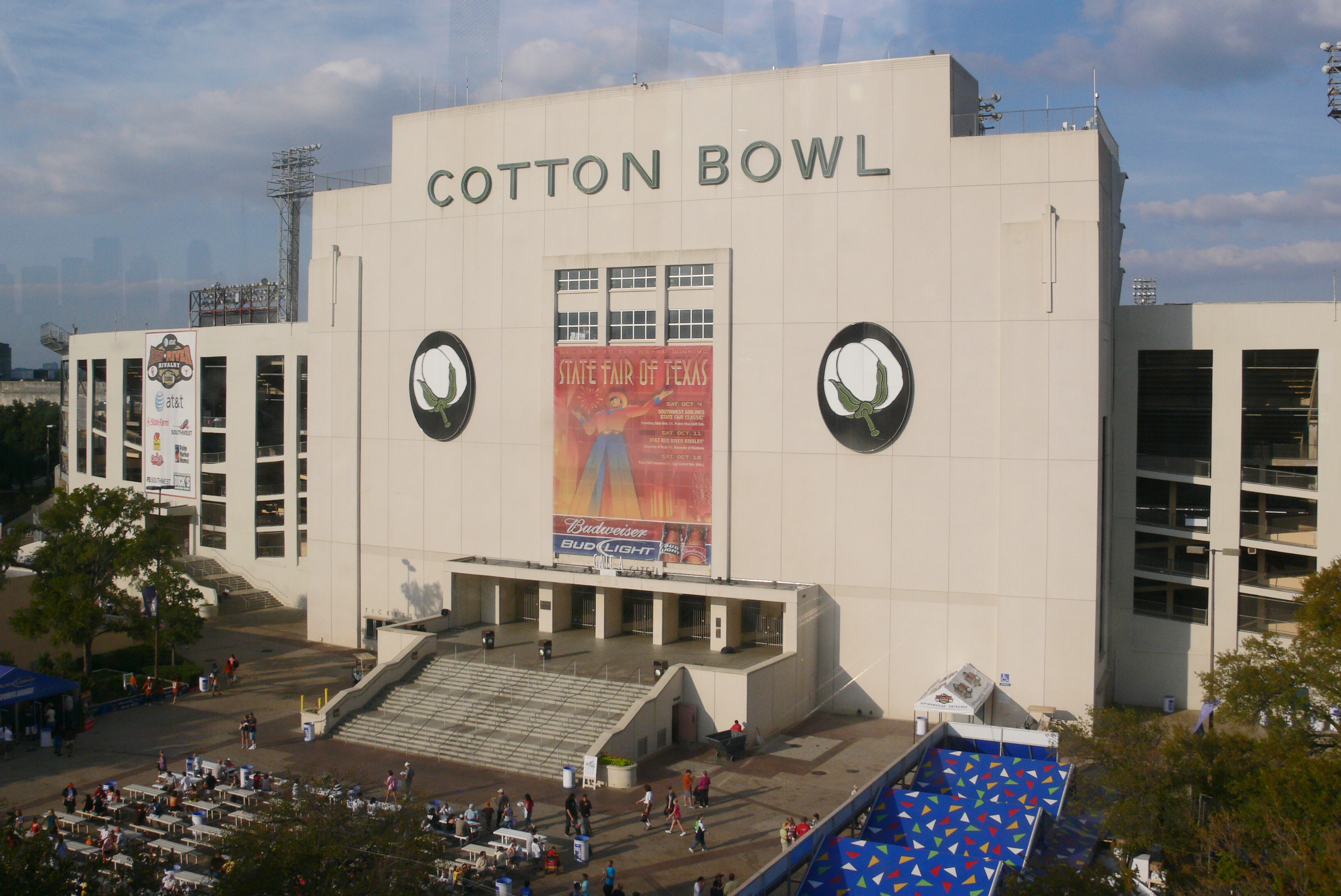
The Cotton Bowl

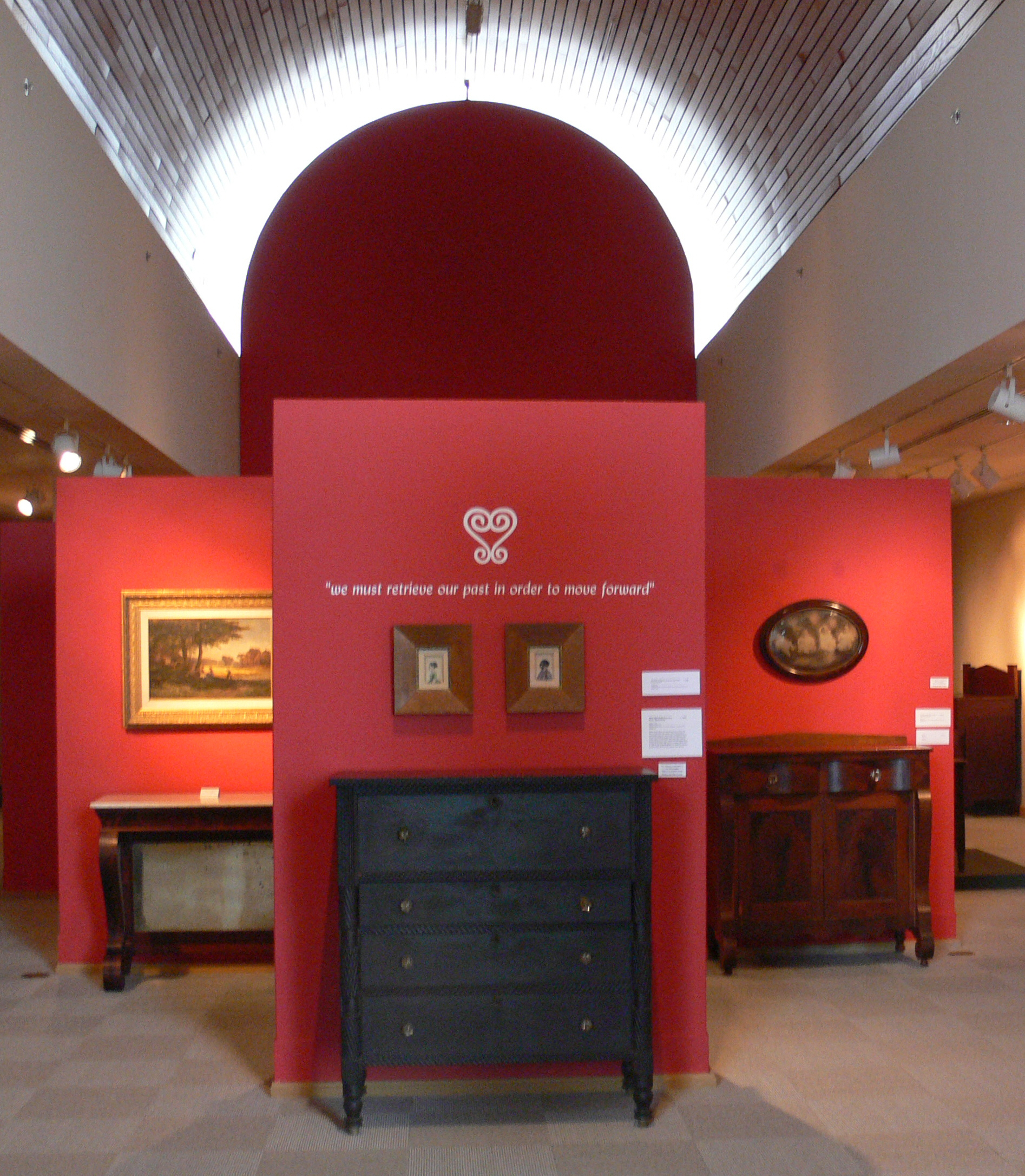
African American Museum

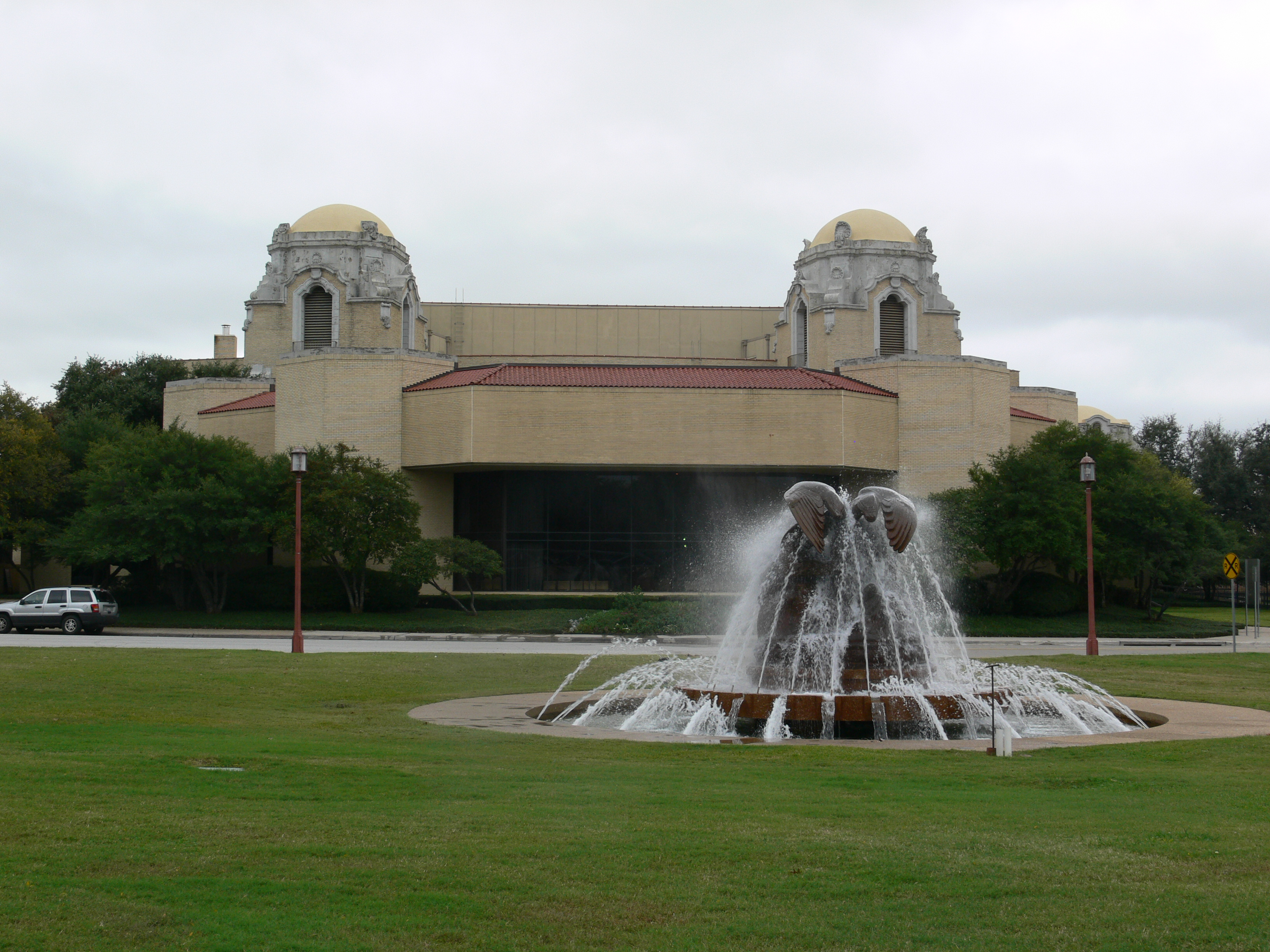
Music Hall at Fair Park

Hall of State

The Hall of State is managed by the Dallas Historical Society, which hosts exhibits inside about Dallas history and culture.

Old Mill Inn

The Old Mill Inn was one of the few Texas Centennial Exposition buildings not to incorporate Art Deco styling. Clad in fieldstone with heavy-timber construction, this was the exhibit building for the flour milling industry. It now sporadically serves Fair Park as a restaurant.

Magnolia Lounge and (former) Hall of Religion

This little-known project by New York architect William Lescaze introduced European Modernism to Texas in 1936. The design of this hospitality lounge for the Magnolia Petroleum Company included elements commonly found in Art Deco architecture. However, the building's overall image was radically different from that of any other structure at the Texas Centennial Exposition.

Site of Theatre '47, the first professional, regional theater company in the United States, the small performing space, the Margo Jones Theatre pays tribute to the visionary founder of America's regional theater movement Margo Jones. Immediately adjacent to the Magnolia Lounge is the former Hall of Religion.

African American Museum

The current museum building occupies virtually the same site as the Texas Centennial Exposition's Hall of Negro Life. It boasts a permanent collection that consists of the works of such highly regarded African American artists as Romare Bearden, Jacob Lawrence, Larry D. Alexander, John T. Biggers, Clementine Hunter, Benny Andrews, Edward Mitchell Bannister and Arthello Beck

The Leonhardt Lagoon

South of the Midway, George Dahl arranged Dallas's future cultural institutions informally around a tranquil lagoon, offering Texas Centennial exposition visitors a peaceful, naturalistic counterpoint to the activity of the exposition.

In 1981, Patricia Johanson was commissioned to redesign and restore the badly degraded lagoon. Since reopening in 1986, the redesigned lagoon has become recognized as a major earth sculpture and one of the earliest examples of art as bioremediation.

Museum of Nature and Science

The Museum of Nature & Science occupied two buildings around the lagoon (one named "The Science Place"), and a planetarium next to the WRR building, before moving most of its operations to the new Perot campus at Victory Park in December 2012. The former History Building remains open on weekends as a secondary campus of the Perot Museum. The IMAX theatre and planetarium at the Fair Park campus are shuttered.

The History Building, once the Museum of Natural History, was designed for the Texas Centennial Exposition as a monolithic, rectangular box. The entrance features three vertical window bays with decorative aluminum mullions. Flanking it are paired pilasters with shell-motif capitals. The rest of the building is clad in limestone. In 1988, the northeast corner of the building was excavated, creating a series of landscaped terraces.

Fair Park Band Shell

The concentric plaster arches of the Band Shell comprise an essentially Art Deco composition. Elements of the Streamline Moderne style are present in the reinforced concrete backstage building. Lighting pylons surround the sloping 5,000-seat amphitheater.

Texas Discovery Gardens

This was the original Horticulture Building for the Texas Centennial Exposition. It has since been altered by exterior renovations and additions, including the minimalist glass Blachly Conservatory. In the gardens behind the main structure is a model home that the Portland Cement Company originally built for the Exposition.

Cotton Bowl

The Cotton Bowl stadium was built in below-grade in 1930, and was originally known as "Fair Park Stadium." Subsequent expansions resulted in a present capacity of 92,200. The Cotton Bowl Classic college football bowl game was played there from 1937 to 2009. Annually during the State Fair of Texas, it hosts the OU–TX game between the University of Oklahoma and the University of Texas, along with the Southwest Airlines State Fair Classic game between Grambling State University (Louisiana) and Prairie View A&M University. It was also the first home of the Dallas Cowboys, from 1960 until their move to Texas Stadium in Irving in 1971.

Music Hall at Fair Park

Music Hall, built in Spanish colonial revival style, was the General Motors Building during the Centennial Exposition. It underwent extensive remodeling in 1972. It was home of the Dallas Opera until 2009 and is the current home for Dallas Summer Musicals.

Women's Building

The Women's building was originally built in 1910 as a park coliseum. It was remodeled as an Art Deco structure for the Centennial Exposition during which it was known as the Hall of Administration. The building was operated as The Women's Museum from 2000 to 2011, but now is only used for special events and exhibits.

== Midway and other structures ==
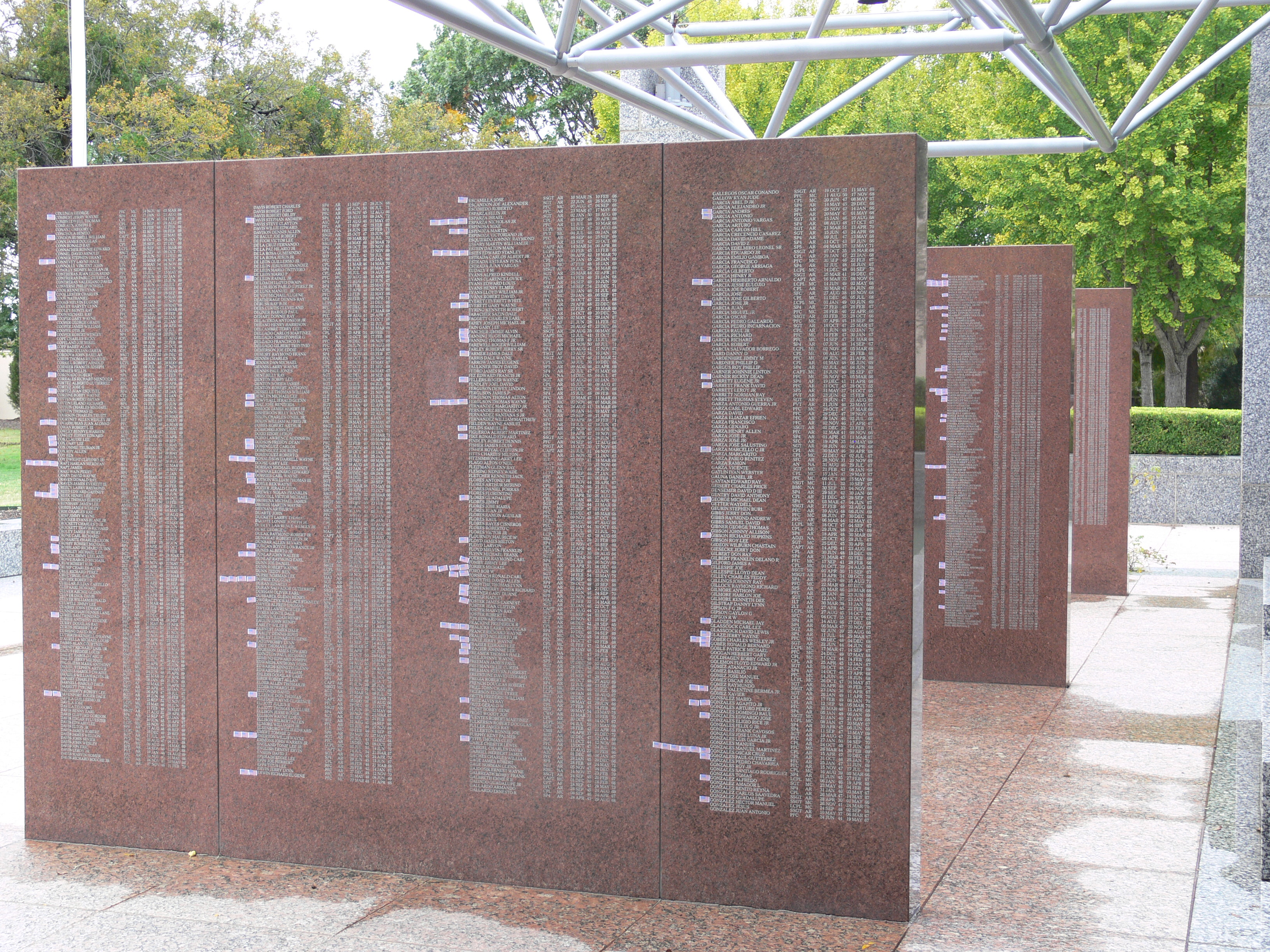
Texas State Vietnam Memorial

- The Texas Star, opened in 1985, is the fourth-largest Ferris wheel in North America.
- Among political infighting, lawsuits and community unrest, Starplex Amphitheatre (f/k/a Smirnoff Music Centre, Coca-Cola Starplex, and Gexa Energy Pavilion, and n/k/a Dos Equis Pavilion) was built. Former Park Board member Jim Graham said the City's agreement with PACE Entertainment "stinks".
- The Texas Skyway, opened in 2007, is an art deco-styled gondola ride that transports visitors 65 feet (20 m) above the ground for a ride that is one-third of a mile.
- The Top o' Texas Tower, opened in 2013, is a 500-foot (150 m) observation tower ride. The tower's base may eventually house a museum devoted to the State Fair and Texas Centennial Exposition collection. At a cost of more than $12,000,000, the Tower was to be the featured ride of the failed Summer Adventures program. Summer Adventures, while planned as an annual event, was open for one year and shuttered, despite a $30,000,000 investment.
- Fair Park is home to the Texas State Vietnam Memorial.

== Annual events ==
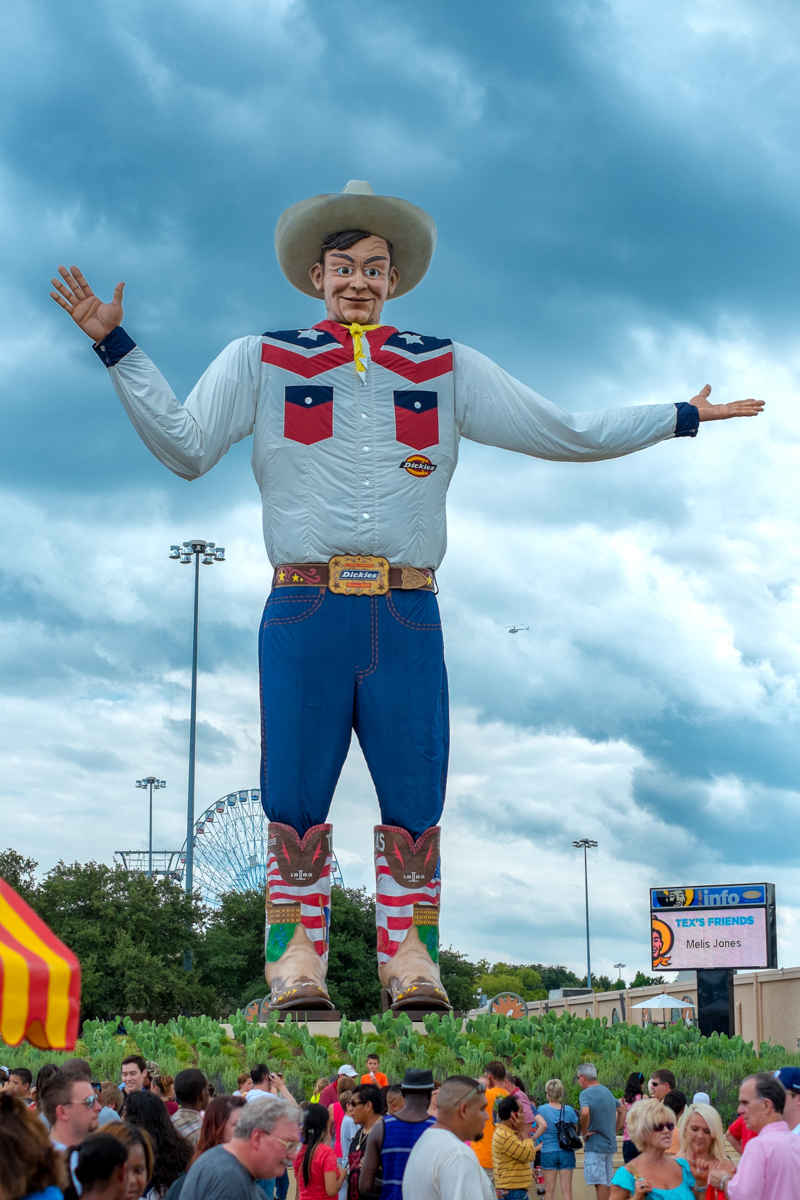
Big Tex, 2013

- The complex's signature event is the annual State Fair of Texas, which has been held there since 1886. It currently lasts 24 days and begins in the last Friday in September and runs to the third Sunday in October.

=== Summer Adventures in Fair Park (initially called Summer Place Park) ===
- The State Fair had plans to unveil Summer Place Park in 2012. These plans would eventually turn into Summer Adventures in Fair Park, a beach-themed amusement park, that operated from May to August 2013. Despite a $30,000,000 investment in Summer Adventures, the event was shuttered after just one season.

=== Other events ===
- The North Texas Irish Festival takes place the first weekend in March each year.
- Earth Day Texas takes place annually in April.
- Fair Park Fourth is the annual Independence Day celebration for the City of Dallas.

== Other notable events ==
Dallas Grand Prix Circuit
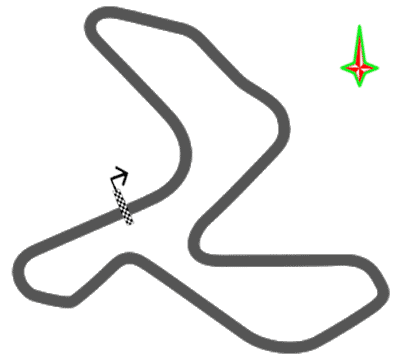
- Trans-Am Circuit (1988)

- Grand Prix Circuit (1984)
- Location: Fair Park, Dallas
- Opened: July 6, 1984; 42 years ago
- Closed: May 1, 1988; 38 years ago
- Major events: Formula One; Dallas Grand Prix (1984); Trans-Am Series (1988); Can-Am (1984)
- Website: https://fairpark.org/index.php/en, https://www.fairparkdallas.com/

Trans-Am Circuit (1988)
- Length: 1.300 mi (2.092 km)
- Turns: 13
- Race lap record: 0:58.269 ( (United States) Hurley Haywood, Audi 200 Quattro, 1988, Trans-Am)

Grand Prix Circuit (1984)
- Length: 2.424 mi (3.901 km)
- Turns: 23
- Race lap record: 1:45.165 ( (Republic of Ireland) Michael Roe, VDS-002, 1984, Can-Am)

- The 1936 film The Big Show, starring Gene Autry, was filmed at Fair Park and much of its architecture is heavily featured.
- In 1961, the musical film State Fair was filmed in Fair Park.
- In July 1984, Fair Park was transformed into a Formula One circuit for a weekend to host the Dallas Grand Prix and Can-Am race. The event was conceived as a way to demonstrate Dallas's status as a "world-class city", but the track was unsuccessful.
- In May 1988, Fair Park also hosted Trans-Am Series race with a different layout.
- On March 8–11, 1990, the Nintendo World Championships were held within the Fair Park's Automobile Building.
- In the early 2000s, Fair Park and many of its cultural institutions (The Science Place, The Dallas Museum of Natural History, Texas Discovery Gardens, and others) were featured heavily on the TV series North Texas Explorer.
- The 18th episode of season 2 of Prison Break has scenes that take place in Fair Park and feature "Jumbo" the mammoth statue, The Women's Museum, the Leonhardt Lagoon, and other attractions.
- In December 2013, the Chanel Paris–Dallas pre-fall show was held at Fair Park.
- In January 2021, Fair Park became a mass COVID-19 vaccination hub operated by Dallas County Health and Human Services. FEMA also opened a hub at the park for vaccinations of 17 underserved zip codes.
- The Dallas FIFA Fan Festival for the 2026 FIFA World Cup was held at the park.

=== Lap records ===
The fastest official race lap records at the Dallas Fair Park Circuit are listed as:

Category	Time	Driver	Vehicle	Event
Trans-Am Circuit (1988): 2.092 km (1.300 mi)
Trans-Am	0:58.269	Hurley Haywood	Audi 200 Quattro	1988 Dallas Trans-Am round
Grand Prix Circuit (1984): 3.901 km (2.424 mi)
Can-Am	1:45.165	Michael Roe	VDS-002	1984 Dallas Can-Am round
Formula One	1:45.353	Niki Lauda	McLaren MP4/2	1984 Dallas Grand Prix

== Transportation ==
- Fair Park is easily accessible from I-30, the major east-west interstate through Dallas.
- Fair Park is served by several bus routes by DART.
- DART's Green Line connects Fair Park to southeast and downtown Dallas with Fair Park station and MLK Jr. station. During the State Fair of Texas DART runs "special event" trains from the Red Line and Blue Line to Fair Park Station.

== Education ==
Irma Rangel Young Women's Leadership School is located in Fair Park.

== See also ==
- List of National Historic Landmarks in Texas
- National Register of Historic Places listings in Dallas County, Texas
- Recorded Texas Historic Landmarks in Dallas County
- List of Dallas Landmarks

== Other sources ==
- Rob Walker (October, 1984). "1st Dallas Grand Prix: Cool Keke". Road & Track, 178-182.
- Mike S. Lang (1992). Grand Prix!: Race-by-race account of Formula 1 World Championship motor racing. Volume 4: 1981 to 1984. Haynes Publishing Group. ISBN 0-85429-733-2
