= Smithfield Fair =

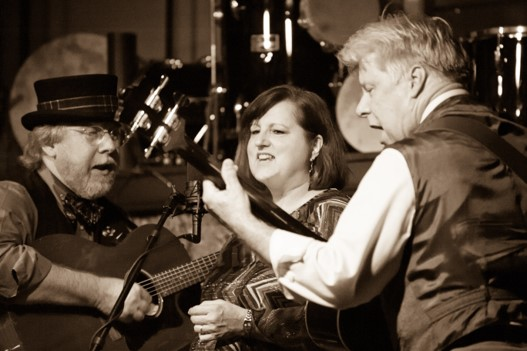
- Smithfield Fair in Baton Rouge, Louisiana, 2019

Background information
- Genres: folk
- Occupations: musicians, songwriters
- Instruments: vocals, guitar, bass, accordion
- Years active: 1973–Present
- Label: Stevenson Productions
- Website: https://smithfieldfair.com/

Smithfield Fair is a group of three musicians from Baton-Rouge, Louisiana. The members are Dudley-Brian Smith on vocals and guitar; Jan Smith, Dudley-Brian's wife on vocals and accordion; and Bobby Smith, Dudley-Brian's brother on vocals and bass.

According to R.U. Eddy in GrisGris Magazine, 2008, "Smithfield Fair, an almost-impossible-to-categorize folk/roots band has mesmerized audiences worldwide over the radio, television, film, clubs and concert halls...has earned praise for its tight arrangements, elegant song selection and some of the most haunting vocal harmonies this side of heaven."

== Career ==
Smithfield Fair began in Pensacola, Florida in 1973 under the name 'Laughter' as a project by Dudley-Brian Smith and Dwight Beebe to promote original songs sung with harmony and backed by acoustic instrumentation. Joined by bassist Tom English, the trio's first recording contract came in 1974 when they worked with famed producer Bud Reneau (songwriter/producer, Dobie Gray and others) in Nashville. Dubbed by one reviewer as “the perfect café band”, Laughter moved home in 1976 to Alexandria, Louisiana where Dudley's brothers Joel and Bob, auxiliary members since the start, joined full-time. The group changed its name to 'Charmer' and released its first single, 'A Place In Your Heart' in 1977 on legendary Floyd Soileau's One Way Records, expanding recognition regionally.

Founding the independent Rapides Records in 1980, they issued their first album, 'Only the Wind' in 1981 followed by ‘Must Be The Gypsy’ in 1982 which boosted them into concert openings for such artists as Louisiana's LeRoux, Zachary Richard and Arlo Guthrie. In 1983, Joel left to pursue other projects, but rejoined in 1985 for a time. Also in 1983 singer/songwriter Jan Dedon Smith joined brothers Dudley-Brian and Bob and the group continued concert appearances with artists such as Jesse Winchester, John Prine, John Fahey, Nancy Griffith; touring the South with New York's The Washington Squares; and appearing at such legendary venues as Storyville Jazz Hall in New Orleans, Rockafella's in Houston, and even the 1984 World's Fair.

By 1989 the group had moved toward the Scottish music of their shared heritage, and the group once more changed its name, this time to 'Smithfield Fair', blending traditional and original songs. They were soon joined by nephew Frank Bladen on bodhran; who remained until late 2008. Smithfield Fair became recognized world-wide as one of the foremost presenters of Scottish music in North America. During this period, the group signed a four-album deal with Centaur World Records, giving them international distribution. Described by critics as “a folksy Supertramp” with a “definite Peter Gabriel vibe”, they continued a busy performance schedule regularly working with a Who's Who of celebrated Celtic performers that included Alasdair Fraser, Eileen Ivers, Brian McNeill, the Battlefield Band, The Tannahill Weavers, Archie Fisher, Andy M. Stewart, and Alex Beaton. For twenty years, they received continual critical praise for the group's strong, seamless pairing of traditional and original songs, and enjoyed international radio and internet airplay. However, the heritage movement began to wind down in the early part of the new millennium, so Smithfield Fair again focused on its original music.

Performances continued at such venues as the Manship Theatre and New Orleans Jazz & Heritage Festival, and Smithfield Fair's music was increasingly used nationally in movies, television and web programs and radio campaigns. Since 2015, the group's original song 'Sweet Sugar Cane' has been licensed by the Louisiana-based American Sugar Cane League and continues as a promotional theme. In 2025 the group was recognized as a "Tradition Bearer", by the Louisiana Folklife Commission and inducted into the Northwestern State University Folklife Center to the Hall of Master Artists. Today, the group's longest-standing line-up of Jan (vocals, accordion, guitar, piano), Bob (vocals, acoustic bass, percussion) and Dudley-Brian Smith (vocals, acoustic guitars, mandolin) continues to actively perform and release new, original music – with album number 36 released in 2025.

In 2025, Smithfield Fair was named a Louisiana "Tradition Bearer" by the Louisiana Folk life Commission and was inducted into the Northwestern State University Folklife Center Hall of Master Folk Artists.

== Discography ==
- 1977: A Place In Your Heart/Crazy With the Wind (One Way 45-2040)
- 1981: Only The Wind (Rapides Records RR01)
- 1982: Must Be The Gypsy (Rapides Records RR002)
- 1983: Dudley-Brian - The Eleventh Hour Tango (Lunatunes LEP01)
- 1983: From the Cradle to the Grave (Lunatunes RR003)
- 1984: Dancing In The Dust (Lunatunes RR004)
- 1985: Retrospect (Lunatunes RR005)
- 1986: Another Southern Summer (Lunatunes RR006)
- 1987: Living In The Mainstreat (Lunatunes RR007)
- 1989: Old Souls & Ancient Hearts (Lunatunes RR008)
- 1990: Old Souls (Reissue, Lunatunes RR008B)
- 1990: From Hebridean Shores (Lunatunes RR009)
- 1992: Moon Over Caledonia (Stevenson Productions RR010)
- 1993: A Long Way From Bonnie Argyll (Stevenson Productions SP73154)
- 1995: Scotland Owns Me (Stevenson Productions SP82853)
- 1997: Scattered Seeds of Scotland (Centaur World CRC5021)
- 1998: Highland Call (Centaur World CRC5023 – 1998/re-issue)
- 2000: Cairdeas/Kinship (Centaur World CRC5024)
- 2001: The Winter Kirk (Stevenson Productions SP122890)
- 2002: Jacobites By Name (Centaur World SP5025)
- 2002: Burns Night Out! (Stevenson Productions SP73154B)
- 2004: Winds of Time (Stevenson Productions SP121873)
- 2005: Swept Away (Stevenson Productions SP122284)
- 2006: Walking Through This World (Stevenson Productions SP81715)
- 2007: Twenty For Twenty (Stevenson Productions SP20420)
- 2008: Charmer: The Perfect Café (Music from the early days of Smithfield Fair) Stevenson Productions SP32956)
- 2009: The Longing (Stevenson Productions SP901919)
- 2010: Scotland, Fair Scotland (Stevenson Productions SP901920)
- 2011: Every New Day (Stevenson Productions SP 901921)
- 2013: Stick, Brick & Mortar (Stevenson Productions SP 901922)
- 2014: Companions (Stevenson Productions SP901923)
- 2015: Marbles: Music for the Little Cinema (Stevenson Productions SP901924)
- 2017: Evermore (Stevenson Productions SP901925)
- 2019: Gospelesque (Stevenson Productions SP901926)
- 2020: In The Air (Stevenson Productions SP901927)
- 2021: Looking For Wonderland (Stevenson Productions SP901928)
- 2022: A Place In Your Heart (Stevenson Productions SP901929)
- 2025: Never Too Late (Stevenson Productions SP901930)

== Festival appearances ==
- New Orleans Jazz & Heritage Festival
- Tom Peyton Memorial Arts Festival (Alexandria, Louisiana)
- Kerrville Folk Festival (Kerrville, Texas)
- Dallas International Festival (Dallas, Texas)
- McPherson Festival of Cultures (McPherson, Kansas)
- Texas Scottish Festival (Decatur, Texas)
- Louisiana Folklife Festival (Natchitoches, Louisiana)
- Celticfest Mississippi (Jackson, Mississippi)
- FestforAll (Baton Rouge, Louisiana)
- Clanjamfry (Memphis, Tennessee)
- Ebb and Flow Festival (Baton Rouge, Louisiana)
- Panama City Scottish Festival (Panama City Beach, Florida)
- The 1984 World's Fair (New Orleans, Louisiana)
- North Texas Irish Festival (Dallas, Texas)
- Northeast Florida Scottish Highland Games and Festival (Jacksonville, Florida)
- Charleston Scottish Games & Highland Gathering (Charleston, South Carolina)
- Houston Highland Games (Houston, Texas)
- Murray State University Highland Faire (Murray, Kentucky)
- Savannah Scottish Games (Savannah, Georgia)
- Virginia Highlands Festival (Abingdon, Virginia)
- Taste of Scotland Festival (Franklin, North Carolina)
