= CMT (American TV channel) =

US television channel

Country Music Television (CMT)
- Logo used since 2017 (Note: Wordmark used since 2004)
- Type: Country music (main); Entertainment
- Country: United States
- Broadcast area: Nationwide
- Headquarters: Los Angeles, California

Programming
- Languages: English; Spanish (via SAP audio track)
- Picture format: 1080i HDTV (downscaled to letterboxed 480i for the SDTV feed)

Ownership
- Owner: Skydance Corporation
- Parent: MTV Entertainment Group
- Sister channels: list of assets owned by Skydance

History
- Launched: March 5, 1983; 43 years ago
- Former names: CMTV (1983)

Links
- Website: CMT.com

Availability

Streaming media
- Affiliated Streaming Service: Paramount+
- Service(s): DirecTV Stream, FuboTV, Hulu + Live TV, Philo, Sling TV, YouTube TV

Country Music Television (CMT) is an American pay TV network that launched on March 5, 1983. It is currently owned by Skydance Corporation through the MTV Entertainment Group unit of its networks division. CMT was the first nationally available channel devoted to country music and country music videos, with its programming also including concerts, specials, and biographies of country music stars.

Over time, the network's programming expanded to incorporate original lifestyle and reality programming, and acquired sitcoms. As of December 2023, CMT is available to approximately 56 million pay television households in the United States; down from its 2011 peak of 93 million households. The channel's headquarters are located at the Paramount Pictures lot in Los Angeles, and has additional offices in Nashville, Tennessee.

== History ==
=== Early years (1983–1997) ===
CMTV, an initialism for Country Music Television, was founded by Glenn D. Daniels, the owner of Video World Productions in Hendersonville, Tennessee. Daniels put together the ownership group of Telestar Corporation and the Blinder Robinson & Company investment bank in a three-way split. Daniels also served as the program director and the first president of the network. The network launched on March 5, 1983, at 6:19 p.m. CT, beating its chief competitor, The Nashville Network, to air by two days. The first video clip to air on CMT was Faron Young's 1971 hit "It's Four in the Morning". The following summer, MTV (which would be acquired by Viacom 16 years later) filed a trademark infringement lawsuit over the initials CMTV, and the network changed its name to simply CMT.

In 1991, Opryland USA and its owner Gaylord Entertainment Company acquired CMT in a $34 million deal. CMT was sold to Music Village USA in 1985 and subsequently to Caribou Communications, under Jim Guercio and Nyhl Henson, in 1986. Opryland USA and owner Gaylord also owned CMT's competitor The Nashville Network. In October 1992, CMT launched its first international channel, CMT Europe, as part of the Sky Multichannels package. In July 1995, CMT launched its Brazilian version in association with Grupo Abril's TVA. By 1998, Gaylord reported $10 million in losses from CMT Europe and decided to cease broadcasting the network on March 31, 1998. Gaylord had planned to emulate the successful model created by E!, by selling large programming blocks to other European channels, but these plans never occurred.

On October 1, 1994, CMT made its first major format change by adding several new music-oriented programs. In 1995, CMT dropped all videos by Canadian artists without U.S. record contracts in response to the network being replaced in Canada by Calgary, Alberta-based New Country Network. By March 1996, CMT had eventually returned the dropped videos to its playlist after reaching an agreement to acquire a 20% ownership of New Country Network, relaunching it as a domestic version of CMT.

=== Under CBS/Viacom (1997–2017) ===
Logo used during 1990s to 2000s

In 1997, both CMT and TNN were sold to Westinghouse, then-owner of CBS, for a reported $1.5 billion. CBS would in-turn be acquired by Viacom in 2000, assuming ownership of CMT and TNN and folding them into the MTV Networks. TNN would phase out country programming to avoid overlap with CMT, changing its full name to "The National Network". (Note: TNN would later relaunch altogether as Spike TV in 2003, and was later rebranded as Paramount Network in 2018. A revival of "The Nashville Network" brand, now known as Heartland, would be launched as a digital broadcast television network in 2012) In-spite of the decrease in music programming, in part due to the rise of internet-based platforms in the 2000s, CMT would experience significant ratings gains in the years' since its acquisition. By 2007, the channel was available in more than 83 million homes.

On April 4, 2012, CMT announced its first adult animated series, Bounty Hunters; and Trinity 911, a 10-episode "workplace docu-comedy". Trinity 911 was later renamed Big Texas Heat and was removed from the schedule after airing four episodes.

On June 10, 2016, CMT announced that they would pick up the ABC series Nashville following its cancellation. The network would order a fifth season of 22 episodes.

=== Restructuring (2017–present) ===
In 2017, as part of Viacom's restructuring plans, CMT would begin a transition back to unscripted programming. As a result, Nashville's sixth season would also be its last.

As part of its shift back to unscripted programming, CMT announced Music City in September 2017, a reality series created by Adam DiVello of The Hills and Laguna Beach fame. Set in Nashville, the show features Bryant Lowry, a drummer in the Nashville pop band Jet Black Alley Cat. The series premiered on March 1, 2018.

In 2019, Viacom acquired Pluto TV, and launched several CMT-branded channels, including a channel focused on Western genre movies (CMT Westerns) and a channel dedicated to Dallas Cowboys Cheerleaders: Making the Team.

In October 2021, CMT picked up the second season of The Last Cowboy—a reality series by Yellowstone co-creator Taylor Sheridan. The program had moved from Paramount Network following abandoned plans to relaunch the outlet as a movie network.

== Programming ==
CMT's current programming consists largely of acquired sitcoms and movies. The channel's daily country music programming consists of a five-hour music video block, seen during the early morning hours. In January 2026, the network's long running flagship show, CMT Hot Twenty Countdown ended after 13 years. It was hosted by Cody Alan and Carissa Culiner, with former hosts and correspondents Katie Cook, Allison DeMarcus, Marley Sherwood, Ashley ShahAhmadi, and Rissi Palmer. Of Paramount's former music channels (not counting its suite of all-music digital channels), CMT has historically been the most devoted to music-related programming and previously set aside at least six hours of its daily schedule for music videos during the overnight and morning hours. In addition, most of CMT's original programming is centered on, or related to, the Culture of Dallas or Nashville, Tennessee, where the network's studios are located.

CMT's music mix is primarily focused on mainstream hit country songs, but also includes occasional videos from crossover, Americana, and alternative acts (dubbed "CMT Edge"). Specials seen on the network include the annual CMT Music Awards (with an "extended version" airing since 2022, when the live telecast moved to CBS), and CMT Crossroads, which pairs country music artists with musicians from other music genres. It also carries simulcasts of MTV and Nickelodeon's own award specials as part of Paramount's common "road block" event programming strategy.

== International and related networks ==
- CMT Europe - Launched in October 1992 and closed in March 1998.
- CMT Brazil - Launched in July 1995 and closed in March 2001. Replaced by MusicCountry.
- CMT Australia - Launched on July 1, 2020, as a replacement for Country Music Channel (CMC). Dedicated to country music videos. Closed in 2025 to relaunch CMC.
- CMT Canada - Canadian version majority-owned by Corus Entertainment with Paramount owning a 10% stake. During the 2010s, the channel drifted away from country-related programming, phased out CMT's original programming (while producing its own programming), and eventually dropped music programming altogether.
- The Nashville Network - A former rival network, TNN became a sibling to CMT in 1997. TNN would eventually shift to a general entertainment format in order to prevent overlap; later relaunching as the male-oriented Spike TV in 2003 and, Paramount Network in 2018.

== CMT Music ==
CMT Music
- Country: United States
- Headquarters: New York

Programming
- Language: English
- Picture format: 480i (SDTV)

Ownership
- Parent: MTV Entertainment Group

History
- Launched: August 1, 1998; 28 years ago
- Former names: VH1 Country (1998–2006); CMT Pure Country (2006–16)

CMT Music (formerly CMT Pure Country) is an American pay television channel and a sister network to CMT. It exclusively carries country music videos in an automated eight-hour programming wheel schedule.

In recent years, CMT Music has lost carriage with the growth of streaming alternatives including its parent company's Paramount+, and has generally been depreciated in current retransmission consent negotiations with cable and streaming providers.

=== History ===
Logo as CMT Pure Country, 2006-2016

The network was first launched as VH1 Country, a country music video-oriented spinoff of VH1, on August 1, 1998; predating the folding of CBS Cable networks TNN and CMT into Viacom. On May 27, 2006, the channel rebranded as CMT Pure Country to realign the CMT brand to solely represent Viacom's country music-related programming.

On January 4, 2016, the network's name was changed to CMT Music. Outside of the addition of full-length video tags throughout videos and new imaging, no major changes came to the channel's programming. In 2015, the network discontinued specific video blocks due to that year's cutbacks throughout Viacom, including music video programmers.

The network has lost carriage throughout time with the growth of streaming video options, being carried solely in standard definition, and CMT no longer being considered a prime network among the former Viacom networks. CMT Music has generally been depreciated by the company in current retransmission consent negotiations with cable and streaming providers for other options including Pluto TV, which provides several CMT and Vevo-branded country music channels, also fully automated. In 2021, Spectrum removed it from their current-day programming packages, with only grandfathered subscribers with older or institutional packages able to view the network.

==== Programming ====
Currently, the network offers an eight-hour wheel of videos, all under the EPG-only title of CMT Music with little theming of video blocks outside promoting special events such as the CMT Music Awards nominees and winners around the ceremony, and using the same video tagging system as CMT, keeping title/artist on screen at all times. As Pure Country, the network featured branded blocks of programming sub-divided by genres and periods of time:

- Pure Vintage featured a mix of classic and vintage country music videos that were filmed and aired prior to 2000, including older performance video clips of songs. The block aired for 30 minutes, twice a day.
- The Edge Bluegrass, neo-traditionalist country, and Americana music videos are featured. Originally branded as Wide Open Country
- Studio 330 Sessions Live sessions recorded at CMT's studios in Nashville (330 refers to CMT's Nashville address of 330 Commerce Street). Segments from the sessions continue to air in the channel's current rotation.
- Pure 12 Pack Countdown As with all of MTV's countdown shows, a limited pool of videos was voted on by fans online and sorted by popularity without industry or recording metrics.
