= 1983 Can-Am season =

16th season of Sports Car Club of America series

Seasons
- ← 1982 1984 →

The 1983 Can Am season was the sixteenth running of the Sports Car Club of America's prototype series and the seventh of the revived series. 1983 marked the second year of Chevrolet having major competition, with Cosworth taking second at Mosport, first at Lime Rock, second at Trois-Rivières, first at the second race at Mosport, and second at Sears Point. Hart would take third at Lime Rock and third at Trois-Rivières. Porsche would get its first podiums this season, with a win at Road America and third at the second race at Mosport. The dominant chassis were Frissbee, Ensign, Lola, VDS, Scandia, and Ralt. Jacques Villeneuve, Sr. was declared champion, with podiums in almost every race. He would, however, become the final major racecar driver to win a Can Am championship.

Bertil Roos won his second straight two liter class championship.

The scoring system was 20-16-14-12-11-10-9-8-7-6-5-4-3-2-1 points for the first fifteen classified drivers. All results counted.

== Results ==
Round	Circuit	Winning driver	Team	Car
1	Mosport	(Canada) Jacques Villeneuve	(Canada) Canadian Tire Racing	Frissbee-Chevrolet
2	Lime Rock	(United Kingdom) Jim Crawford	(United Kingdom) Fernley Racing	Ensign-Cosworth
3	Road America	(United Kingdom) John Fitzpatrick	(United Kingdom) JDavid Racing	Porsche 956
4	Trois-Rivières	(Canada) Jacques Villeneuve	(Canada) Canadian Tire Racing	Frissbee-Chevrolet
5	Mosport	(United Kingdom) Jim Crawford	(United Kingdom) Fernley Racing	Ensign-Cosworth
6	Sears Point	(Canada) Jacques Villeneuve	(Canada) Canadian Tire Racing	Frissbee-Chevrolet
