= Dolls for Darfur =

Dolls for Dafur is a Jewish charity dedicated to making the world take immediate action on the Darfur conflict in Sudan. Dolls for Darfur is facilitated by Rabbi David E. Stern and Temple Emanu-El of Dallas. The organization has made thousands of pins representing the victims of Darfur. These pins, made out of Guatemalan worry dolls, along with programs, have been used to lobby for a sterner American response to the genocide in Darfur. Many youth in the United States have contributed to the project by making pins.
