= Henrik Hagtvedt =

Norwegian-American scholar, artist, and author

Henrik Hagtvedt (born January 6, 1971 in Sandefjord, Norway) is a Norwegian-American scholar, artist, and author. He was initially known as a visual artist, but he later transitioned to a career in academia, and he is currently a marketing professor at Boston College. As a scholar, his main areas of expertise include aesthetics and visual phenomena.

As an artist in the 1990s and early 2000s, Hagtvedt worked predominantly with acrylics and oils, as well as with sculpture, graphics and other media. In the years following his studies at the Accademia di Belle Arti in Florence, Italy, his work had a rapid rise to fame and was exhibited in a number of galleries in both Europe and Asia, ranging from the Museo Montelupo in Italy to the Cultural Foundation (national gallery) in the United Arab Emirates. Although he has painted in a variety of styles, from abstract to photo-realism, Henrik Hagtvedt is most famous for a thickly textured and highly expressive style which gained him a great deal of critical acclaim and media attention early in his career. It was presumably this style that earned him the nickname “The Northern Light,” first given to him in Italy. However, little time elapsed before Hagtvedt began declining exhibitions and distancing himself from the contemporary art scene, thus virtually disappearing from both the public eye and from mainstream art institutions, almost as suddenly as he had appeared upon the scene some years earlier.

Hagtvedt's sudden departure from the mainstream art scene coincided with a decision to pursue business studies, including an MBA and a PhD from the University of Georgia. As a scholar, he has conducted scientific research pertaining to the psychological impact of art and the intersection of art and marketing, as well as aesthetics and visual phenomena more broadly, including topics such as color, logos, product and promotional design, and luxury branding. His research, which appears in academic journals in disciplines such as marketing, psychology, management, and neuroscience, has received substantial attention from the international press. His 2024 book Money and Marketing in the Art World extends that research to a holistic analysis of the art market. Hagtvedt’s other notable contributions include the concept of art infusion, which he introduced along with his collaborator Vanessa M. Patrick in 2008. Art infusion refers to the general influence of artworks on perceptions and evaluations of products and other objects or entities with which the artworks are associated.
