= Toyota Celica Turbo (IMSA GTO racing car) =

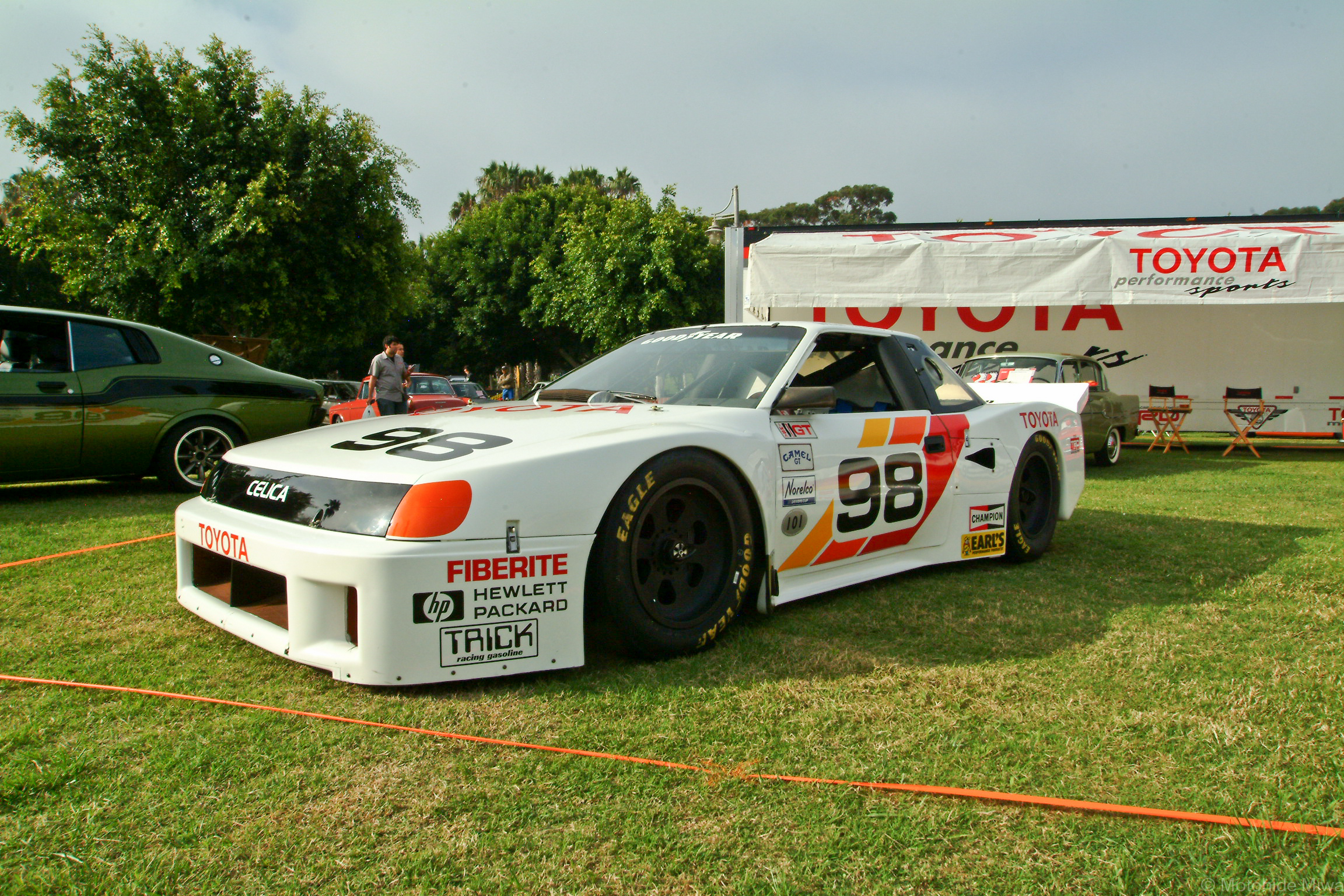
- Category: IMSA GTO
- Constructor: All American Racers
- Designer: Roman Slobodinsky

Technical specifications
- Chassis: Chrome-molybdenum tubular spaceframe, carbon-fiber composite body
- Suspension: Double wishbones, coil springs over shock absorbers, anti-roll bar
- Length: 172 in (436.9 cm)
- Width: 68 in (172.7 cm)
- Height: 45 in (114.3 cm)
- Axle track: 56.5 in (143.5 cm) (front); 56 in (142.2 cm) (rear)
- Wheelbase: 99 in (2,514.6 mm)
- Engine: Toyota 4T-GTE 2,090 cc (127.5 cu in) I4 Turbocharger Front-engined, longitudinally mounted
- Transmission: 5-speed manual transmission
- Weight: 2,110 lb (957.1 kg)
- Tyres: Goodyear

Competition history
- Notable entrants: All American Racers

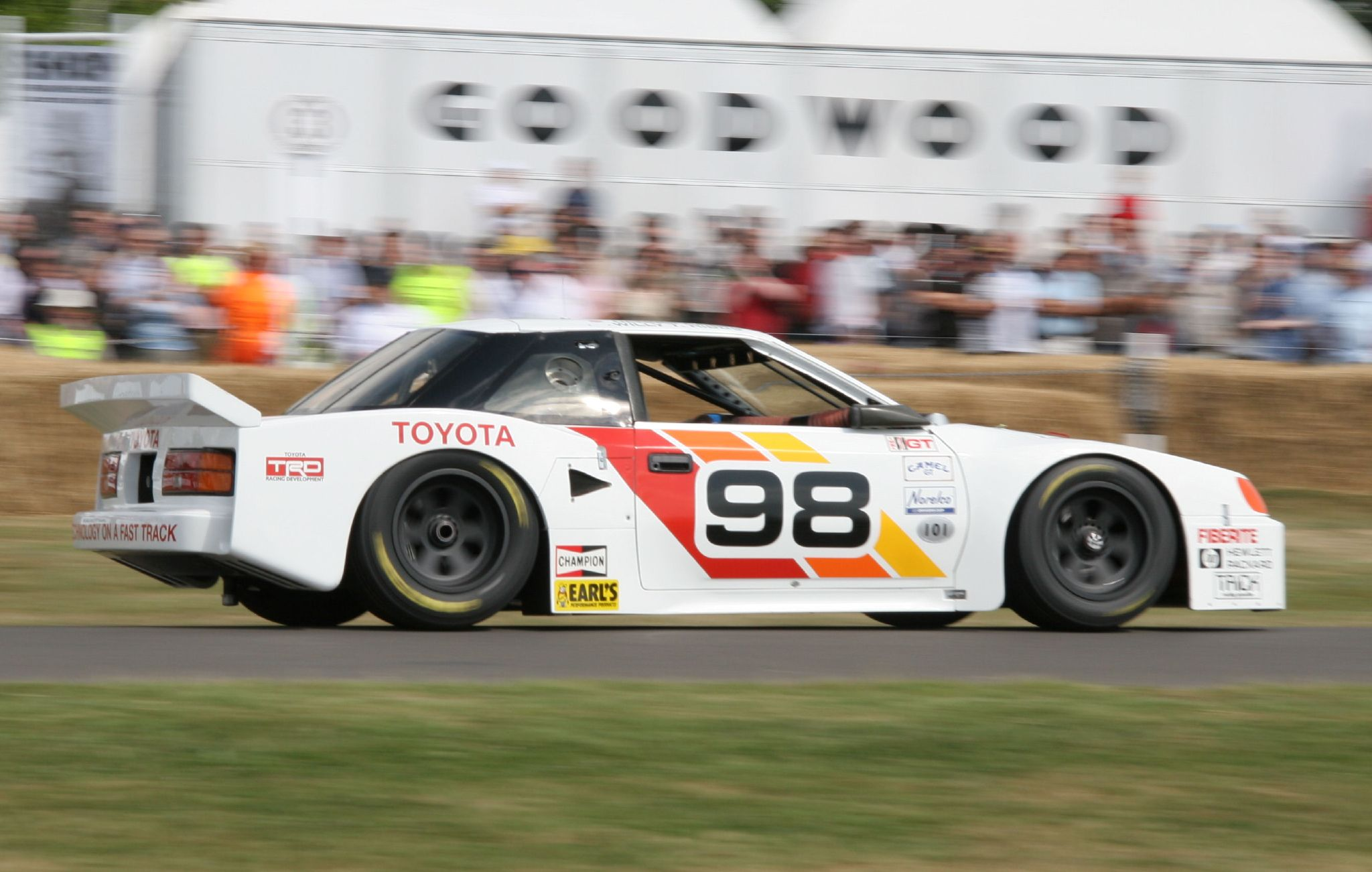
Toyota Celica Turbo IMSA GTO at the 2006 Goodwood Festival of Speed.

The Toyota Celica Turbo is a race car, designed, developed and produced by Toyota, in collaboration and partnership with All-American Racers, for the IMSA GTO class of the IMSA GT Championship, between 1986 and 1988. A total of 3 models were built.
