= David E. Stern =

American rabbi (born 1961)

Rabbi David Eli Stern (born August 1961) is the senior rabbi at Temple Emanu-El of Dallas, the largest synagogue in the South/Southwest United States and the third-largest in the Union for Reform Judaism. He was selected as the 26th most influential rabbi in America by Newsweek magazine in 2008 and the 30th most influential in 2009.

== Education ==
Rabbi Stern graduated with high honors from Dartmouth College, earned his M. A. in Jewish education from the Rhea Hirsch School of Education at HUC-JIR Los Angeles, California in 1988, and was ordained from HUC in 1989.

== Career ==
Rabbi Stern was the 2017-2019 President of CCAR, the Central Conference of American Rabbis, and is known for his efforts on social justice. He is the vice-chair of the Union for Reform Judaism's Joint Commission on Social Action and Chair of the Commission's Task Force on Economic Justice. He has been a fierce advocate in leading Temple Emanu-El and the Jewish community on issues such as Darfur including the creation of the Dolls for Darfur program and visiting Sudanese Refugees in Chad. He is also the past chair of both the Dallas Faith Communities Coalition, the Children's Advisory Board of the Dallas Children's Advocacy Center, and the Rabbinic Association of Greater Dallas. Rabbi Stern serves on the boards of both CHAI (Community Homes for Adults, Inc.) and the Dallas Jewish Coalition for the Homeless. He is also associated with the National Interreligious Leadership Initiative for Peace in the Middle East, and was a signatory on the group's February 28, 2006 National Interreligious Leadership Delegation for Peace in the Middle East Appeal to the President [George W. Bush] to Make Israeli-Palestinian Peace a Priority of U.S. Policy.

Rabbi Stern is also widely regarded for his sermons and adult education. He led at $17.5 million Endowment Campaign in 2002-2003. Temple Emanu-El established the Rabbi David E. Stern Endowed Scholarship in April 2007 in honor of his 18th year as a rabbi and 18th year at Temple Emanu-El. (The number 18 holds significant value in Judaism).

Rabbi Stern is on the editorial board for the CCAR Journal, the journal for the Central Conference of American Rabbis, and also chairs the Governance Task Force of the CCAR. He is on the prestigious HUC-JIR's President's Rabbinic Council.

In March 2017, Rabbi Stern was installed as President of CCAR, the third generation of his family to hold that office.

== Personal life ==
Rabbi Stern is the son of Rabbi Jack Stern, the longtime former rabbi of Westchester Reform Temple and the poet Priscilla Rudin Stern (who is the daughter of Rabbi Jacob Philip Rudin, the longtime Rabbi at Temple Beth-El in Great Neck, New York). He is married to Rabbi Nancy Kasten and has three children.

== See also ==
- History of the Jews in Dallas, Texas
