= Art Infusion =

In marketing, art infusion is the general influence of artworks on perceptions and evaluations of products or other objects and entities with which the artworks are associated.

The term was first introduced in an article in the Journal of Marketing Research in 2008. Henrik Hagtvedt and Vanessa Patrick, the two researchers who authored the article, demonstrated a favorable influence of artworks on consumer evaluations of non-art products that were associated with the artworks via, for instance, advertising or product design. The authors suggested that the creation and appreciation of art has evolved through the millennia of human prehistory, and that the universal human impulse to apply skill and creative effort to express oneself artistically is also reflected in the recognition of the objects thus created as belonging to a special category. This special category has several characteristics, including non-utility. This does not imply that artworks cannot have utility, but that creativity and skill are central to the creation and appreciation of the artwork, irrespective of any other functions, or lack thereof, that the artwork may serve. This non-utilitarian quest for excellence, when associated with other objects, leads to more favorable evaluations of those objects.
