= Bob Fernley =

British motorsport manager (1953–2023)

- Born: Robert George Fernley; 7 January 1953; Stockport, Cheshire, England
- Died: 30 June 2023 (aged 70)
- Known for: Being Deputy Team Principal at Sahara Force India F1 Team

Robert George Fernley (7 January 1953 – 30 June 2023) was a British motorsport manager businessman who served as a chairman of the FIA Single-Seater Commission.

== Career ==
Fernley had a long history of managing racing teams, having owned a lot of equipment in the United States, especially for the IndyCar series. He also had a long association with Vijay Mallya, so when the Indian businessman acquired the Spyker F1 team and turned it into Force India, it did not take long for Fernley to join the new team's board. He was Force India's deputy team principal, and was in charge of the team's operations on race weekends when Mallya—who had not been able to leave the UK in years—did not show up. He also dealt with matters relating to the FIA and Formula 1 organizers. Fernley left Force India after its assets were purchased by a consortium led by Lawrence Stroll in August 2018.

On 15 November 2018, Fernley was announced as president of McLaren's Indianapolis 500 project. He assumed the role as a subordinate of Zak Brown, CEO of McLaren. In May 2019, it was announced that McLaren would not renew Fernley's contract after Fernando Alonso failed to qualify for the 2019 Indianapolis 500.

On 17 December 2020, it was announced that Fernley would replace Stefano Domenicali as chairman of the FIA Single-Seater Commission. He was replaced in April 2022.

Fernley died of bladder cancer on 30 June 2023, at the age of 70.
