= North Texas Irish Festival =

North Texas Irish Festival (locally known as NTIF) is an annual three-day ethnic festival held at Dallas' historic Fair Park the first weekend in March. Started in 1983, the festival is the second oldest Irish festival in the country and the largest in the southwest.

The NTIF is produced by the Southwest Celtic Music Association (SCMA), a non-profit corporation founded in 1984 after the first festival. The mission of SCMA is to increase public awareness of the rich cultural heritage of the Celtic people and its enduring efforts on the culture found in the United States. The SCMA sponsors concerts, music and dance workshops, provides referrals for entertainers, organizes regular sessions, and supports other cultural associations with similar purposes.

The festival headline bands have included Altan, Tommy Makem, Clancy Brothers, Aoife Clancy, Cathie Ryan, Makem Brothers, Dervish, Greenfields of America, Cherish the Ladies, Solas, and Celtic Spring.

Local musicians include many performances from local North Texas pipe and drum bands as well as music from dozens of artists from Texas and surrounding states appearing on nine stages of live music running concurrently.

NTIF celebrated its 27th anniversary in March, 2009 in an expanded location with a record attendance of over 62,000 people.

2021 was the 39th festival, and for the first time, virtual. 2022 resumed live celebrations.
