= 1984 Can-Am season =

Racing season

Seasons
- ← 1983 1985 →

The 1984 Can Am season was the seventeenth running of the Sports Car Club of America's prototype series, and the eighth running of the revived series. 1984 would mark a major downturn in the series, as Juan Manuel Fangio II would become the last major driver to podium in a Can Am Series race, finishing third at Dallas. The dominant manufacturers were Chevrolet, Hart, BMW for the first time with a third-place finish at Brainerd, Cosworth, Lola, Ralt, and March. Dominant chassis were VDS, March, Frissbee-Lola, Ralt, and Williams with their first podium with a third-place finish at Lime Rock. Michael Roe was declared champion, with seven wins. The final race at Green Valley would feature the final truly notable driver in series history, John Andretti.

Kim Campbell won the two liter class in his March BMW.

== Results ==
Round	Circuit	Winning driver	Team	Car
1	Mosport	(Republic of Ireland) Michael Roe	(United States) Dallas Motorsports Inc.	VDS-Chevrolet
2	Dallas	(Republic of Ireland) Michael Roe	(United States) Dallas Motorsports Inc.	VDS-Chevrolet
3	Brainerd	(Republic of Ireland) Michael Roe	(United States) Dallas Motorsports Inc.	VDS-Chevrolet
4	Lime Rock	(Republic of Ireland) Michael Roe	(United States) Dallas Motorsports Inc.	VDS-Chevrolet
5	Road Atlanta	(United Kingdom) Jim Crawford	(United States) RK Racing/United Breweries	March-Chevrolet
6	Trois-Rivières	(United Kingdom) Jim Crawford	(United States) RK Racing/United Breweries	March-Chevrolet
7	Mosport	(Republic of Ireland) Michael Roe	(United States) Dallas Motorsports Inc.	VDS-Chevrolet
8	Sears Point	(Republic of Ireland) Michael Roe	(United States) Dallas Motorsports Inc.	VDS-Chevrolet
9	Riverside	(Republic of Ireland) Michael Roe	(United States) Dallas Motorsports Inc.	VDS-Chevrolet
10	Green Valley	(United Kingdom) Jim Crawford	(United States) RK Racing/United Breweries	March-Chevrolet
