= Michael Roe (racing driver) =

Former Irish racing driver

Michael Roe (born 8 August 1955) is a former racing driver from Naas, Ireland.

Roe began racing in Formula Ford and won the 1978 Formula Ford Festival. The following year he drove in British Formula Three and finished in ninth place in his rookie campaign with two podium finishes for David Clark's team. In 1983, he moved to the United States to compete in the single-seat Can-Am series where he finished eighth in the championship. In 1984, Roe won seven of the ten rounds of the series on his way to dominating the championship, setting a series record for wins in a season as well as poles in a season (all ten rounds). The following year, Roe competed in CART Championship Car racing and made four starts for Hemelgarn Racing with a best finish of seventh at Portland followed up by an eighth-place finish later that month at Meadowlands Racetrack. His two point-scoring finishes placed him 27th in the championship. He also attempted to qualify his Hemelgarn Lola-Cosworth for the Indianapolis 500, but he was bumped from the field.

== Racing record ==
=== PPG Indycar Series ===
(key) (Races in bold indicate pole position)

Year	Team	Chassis	Engine	1	2	3	4	5	6	7	8	9	10	11	12	13	14	15	Rank	Points	Ref
1985	Hemelgarn Racing	Lola T900	Cosworth DFX V8t	LBH; 21	INDY; DNQ	MIL	POR; 7	MEA; 8	CLE; 26	MCH	ROA	POC	MDO	SAN	MCH	LAG	PHX	MIA	**27th**	**11**	

=== 24 Hours of Le Mans results ===
Year	Team	Co-drivers	Car	Class	Laps	Pos.	Class pos.
1989	(United Kingdom) Aston Martin (United Kingdom) Ecurie Ecosse	(Greece) Costas Los (United Kingdom) Brian Redman	Aston Martin AMR1	C1	340	11th	9th
1990	(United States) Nissan Performance Technology Inc.	(United States) Bob Earl (New Zealand) Steve Millen	Nissan R90CK	C1	311	17th	17th

Sporting positions
Preceded by Chico Serra	Formula Ford Festival Winner; 1978	Succeeded by Don MacLeod
Preceded by Jacques Villeneuve	Can-Am Champion; 1984	Succeeded by Rick Miaskiewicz
