= List of 1993 motorsport champions =

1993 motorsport champions
Previous: 1992	Next: 1994

This list of 1993 motorsport champions is a list of national or international auto racing series with a Championship decided by the points or positions earned by a driver from multiple races.

== Dirt oval racing ==
Series	Champion	Refer
World of Outlaws Sprint Car Series	(United States) Steve Kinser	
World of Outlaws Sprint Car Series	Teams: (United States) Karl Kinser Racing	

== Drag racing ==
Series	Champion	Refer
NHRA Winston Drag Racing Series	Top Fuel: (United States) Eddie Hill	1993 NHRA Winston Drag Racing Series
NHRA Winston Drag Racing Series	Funny Car: (United States) John Force	1993 NHRA Winston Drag Racing Series
NHRA Winston Drag Racing Series	Pro Stock: (United States) Warren Johnson	1993 NHRA Winston Drag Racing Series
NHRA Winston Drag Racing Series	Pro Stock Motorcycle: (United States) Dave Schultz	1993 NHRA Winston Drag Racing Series

== Karting ==
Series	Driver	Season article
CIK-FIA Karting World Championship	FSA: (Italy) Nicola Gianniberti	
CIK-FIA Karting World Championship	Formula A: (France) David Terrien	
CIK-FIA Karting World Championship	FC: (Italy) Alessandro Piccini	
CIK-FIA Five Continents Cup Junior A	(Italy) Ennio Gandolfi	
CIK-FIA Karting European Championship	FSA: (Italy) Nicola Gianniberti	
CIK-FIA Karting European Championship	ICC: (Italy) Stefano Marcolin	
CIK-FIA Karting European Championship	FA: (Belgium) Guy de Nies	
CIK-FIA Karting European Championship	ICA: (France) Arnaud Sarrazin	
CIK-FIA Karting European Championship	ICA-J: (Italy) Max Russomando	
CIK-FIA Karting European Championship	Cadet: (Italy) Giorgio Pantano	
World Superkart Championship	(Netherlands) Perry Grondstra	

== Motorcycle racing ==
Series	Rider	Season article
500cc World Championship	(United States) Kevin Schwantz	1993 Grand Prix motorcycle racing season
250cc World Championship	(Japan) Tetsuya Harada	1993 Grand Prix motorcycle racing season
125cc World Championship	(Germany) Dirk Raudies	1993 Grand Prix motorcycle racing season
Superbike World Championship	(United States) Scott Russell	1993 Superbike World Championship season
Speedway World Championship	(United States) Sam Ermolenko	1993 Individual Speedway World Championship
AMA Superbike Championship	(United States) Doug Polen	
Australian Superbike Championship	(Australia) Troy Corser	

== Open wheel racing ==
Series	Driver	Season article
FIA Formula One World Championship	(France) Alain Prost	1993 Formula One World Championship
FIA Formula One World Championship	Constructors: (United Kingdom) Williams-Renault	1993 Formula One World Championship
PPG Indy Car World Series	(United Kingdom) Nigel Mansell	1993 PPG Indy Car World Series
PPG Indy Car World Series	Manufacturers: (United States) Chevrolet	1993 PPG Indy Car World Series
PPG Indy Car World Series	Rookies: (United Kingdom) Nigel Mansell	1993 PPG Indy Car World Series
Indy Lights Series	(United States) Bryan Herta	1993 Indy Lights season
British Formula Two Championship	(Belgium) Philippe Adams	1993 British Formula Two Championship
All-Japan Formula 3000 Championship	(Japan) Kazuyoshi Hoshino	1993 Japanese Formula 3000 Championship
American Indycar Series	(United States) Rick Sutherland	1993 American Indycar Series
Toyota Atlantic Championship	(Canada) David Empringham	1993 Atlantic Championship
Australian Drivers' Championship	(Australia) Mark Skaife	1993 Australian Drivers' Championship
Barber Saab Pro Series	(Sweden) Kenny Bräck	1993 Barber Saab Pro Series
Formula König	(Germany) Jörg Bergmeister	1993 Formula König season
Formula König	Teams: (Germany) Farnbacher Racing	1993 Formula König season
Formula Toyota	(Japan) Mitsuhiro Kinoshita	1993 Formula Toyota season
Formula Toyota	West: (Japan) Eiji Sengoku	1993 Formula Toyota season
SCCA American Continental Championship	(United States) Ernest Sikes	1993 SCCA American Continental Championship
Star Mazda Championship	(United States) Ben Massey	1993 Star Mazda Championship
USAC FF2000 Western Division Championship	(United States) David DeSilva	1993 USAC FF2000 Western Division Championship
USAC FF2000 Eastern Division Championship	(United States) Chris Simmons	1993 USAC FF2000 Eastern Division Championship
Formula Three
All-Japan Formula Three Championship	(Denmark) Tom Kristensen	1993 All-Japan Formula Three Championship
All-Japan Formula Three Championship	Teams: (Japan) TOM'S	1993 All-Japan Formula Three Championship
Austria Formula 3 Cup	(Italy) Massimiliano Angelelli	1993 Austria Formula 3 Cup
Brazilian Formula Three Championship	(Argentina) Fernando Croceri	1993 Brazilian Formula Three Championship
Brazilian Formula Three Championship	Teams: (Brazil) Césario Fórmula	1993 Brazilian Formula Three Championship
British Formula Three Championship	(United Kingdom) Kelvin Burt	1993 British Formula Three Championship
British Formula Three Championship	National: (United Kingdom) Jamie Spence	1993 British Formula Three Championship
Chilean Formula Three Championship	(Chile) Giuseppe Bacigalupo	1993 Chilean Formula Three Championship
French Formula Three Championship	(France) Didier Cottaz	1993 French Formula Three Championship
French Formula Three Championship	Teams: (France) Formula Project Equipe	1993 French Formula Three Championship
German Formula Three Championship	(Netherlands) Jos Verstappen	1993 German Formula Three Championship
German Formula Three Championship	B: (Germany) Patrick Bernhardt	1993 German Formula Three Championship
Italian Formula Three Championship	(Italy) Christian Pescatori	1993 Italian Formula Three Championship
Italian Formula Three Championship	Teams: (Italy) Supercars	1993 Italian Formula Three Championship
Mexican Formula Three Championship	(Mexico) Carlos Guerrero	1993 Mexican Formula Three Championship
Formula 3 Sudamericana	(Argentina) Fernando Croceri	1993 Formula 3 Sudamericana
Formula 3 Sudamericana	National: (Brazil) Milton Sperafico	1993 Formula 3 Sudamericana
Swiss Formula Three Championship	(Switzerland) Rüdi Schurter	1993 Swiss Formula Three Championship
Formula Renault
French Formula Renault Championship	(France) David Dussau	1993 French Formula Renault Championship
Eurocup Formula Renault	(France) Olivier Couvreur	
Eurocup Formula Renault	Teams: (France) Synergie	
Formula Renault Germany	(Germany) Arnd Meier	1993 Formula Renault Germany
Formula Renault Argentina	(Argentina) Juan Manuel Silva	1993 Formula Renault Argentina
Formula Renault Sport UK	(Spain) Ivan Arias	1993 Formula Renault Sport UK
Formula Renault Sport UK	Teams: Racing for Spain-Minister	1993 Formula Renault Sport UK
Spanish Formula Renault Championship	(Spain) David Bosch	1993 Spanish Formula Renault Championship
Formula Ford
Australian Formula Ford Championship	(Australia) Craig Lowndes	1993 Australian Formula Ford Championship
Benelux Formula Ford 1800 Championship	(Belgium) Geoffroy Horion	1993 Benelux Formula Ford 1800 Championship
Benelux Formula Ford 1600 Championship	(Netherlands) Marcel Kooy	1993 Benelux Formula Ford 1600 Championship
British Formula Ford Championship	(Australia) Russell Ingall	1993 British Formula Ford Championship
Danish Formula Ford Championship	(Denmark) Jan Neumann	
Dutch Formula Ford 1800 Championship	(Netherlands) Tom Coronel	1993 Dutch Formula Ford 1800 Championship
Formula Mirage	(Japan) Shoichi Ito	1993 Formula Mirage season
Finnish Formula Ford Championship	(Finland) Sami Lahokoski	
New Zealand Formula Ford Championship	(New Zealand) Ashley Stichbury	
Formula Ford 1600 Nordic Championship	(Finland) Sami Lahokoski	
Portuguese Formula Ford Championship	(Portugal) Gonçalo Gomes	
Spanish Formula Ford Championship	(Spain) Pedro Jorgensen	
Swedish Formula Ford Championship	(Sweden) Magnus Wallinder	

== Rallying ==
Series	Driver/Co-Driver	Season article
World Rally Championship	(Finland) Juha Kankkunen	1993 World Rally Championship
World Rally Championship	Co-Drivers: (France) Daniel Grataloup	1993 World Rally Championship
World Rally Championship	Manufacturer: (Japan) Toyota	1993 World Rally Championship
FIA Cup for Production Cars	(Italy) Alex Fassina	1993 World Rally Championship
African Rally Championship	(Zambia) Satwant Singh	1993 African Rally Championship
Asia-Pacific Rally Championship	(New Zealand) Possum Bourne	1993 Asia-Pacific Rally Championship
Asia-Pacific Rally Championship	Co-Drivers: (New Zealand) Rodger Freeth	1993 Asia-Pacific Rally Championship
Australian Rally Championship	(Australia) Neal Bates	1993 Australian Rally Championship
Australian Rally Championship	Co-Drivers: (Australia) Coral Taylor	1993 Australian Rally Championship
British Rally Championship	(United Kingdom) Richard Burns	1993 British Rally Championship
British Rally Championship	Co-Drivers: (United Kingdom) Robert Reid	1993 British Rally Championship
Canadian Rally Championship	(Canada) Tom McGeer	1993 Canadian Rally Championship
Canadian Rally Championship	Co-Drivers: (Canada) Trish Sparrow	1993 Canadian Rally Championship
Deutsche Rallye Meisterschaft	(Germany) Dieter Depping	
Estonian Rally Championship	(Estonia) Marek Toome	1993 Estonian Rally Championship
Estonian Rally Championship	Co-Drivers: (Estonia) Aleksander Käo	1993 Estonian Rally Championship
European Rally Championship	(France) Pierre-César Baroni	1993 European Rally Championship
European Rally Championship	Co-Drivers: (France) Denis Giraudet	1993 European Rally Championship
Finnish Rally Championship	Group A +2000cc: (Finland) Sebastian Lindholm	1993 Finnish Rally Championship
Finnish Rally Championship	Group N +2000cc: (Finland) Juha Hellman	1993 Finnish Rally Championship
Finnish Rally Championship	Group A -2000cc: (Finland) Timo Niinimäki	1993 Finnish Rally Championship
Finnish Rally Championship	Group N -2000cc: (Finland) Jorma Laakso	1993 Finnish Rally Championship
French Rally Championship	(France) Bernard Béguin	
Hungarian Rally Championship	(Hungary) László Ranga	
Hungarian Rally Championship	Co-Drivers: (Hungary) Ernő Büki	
Indian National Rally Championship	(India) N. Leelakrishnan	
Indian National Rally Championship	Co-Drivers: (India) N. Mahindran	
Italian Rally Championship	(Italy) Gilberto Pianezzola	
Italian Rally Championship	Co-Drivers: (Italy) Loris Roggia	
Italian Rally Championship	Manufacturers: (Italy) Lancia	
Middle East Rally Championship	(Qatar) Hamed Al-Thani	
New Zealand Rally Championship	(New Zealand) Joe McAndrew	1993 New Zealand Rally Championship
New Zealand Rally Championship	Co-Drivers: (New Zealand) Robert Haldane	1993 New Zealand Rally Championship
Polish Rally Championship	(Poland) Paweł Przybylski	
Romanian Rally Championship	(Romania) Ludovic Balint	
Scottish Rally Championship	(United Kingdom) Murray Grierson	
Scottish Rally Championship	Co-Drivers: (United Kingdom) Stewart Merry	
South African National Rally Championship	(Belgium) Serge Damseaux	
South African National Rally Championship	Co-Drivers: (South Africa) Vito Bonafede	
South African National Rally Championship	Manufacturers: (Germany) Volkswagen	
Spanish Rally Championship	(Spain) Mia Bardolet	
Spanish Rally Championship	Co-Drivers: (Spain) Joaquin Muntada	

=== Rallycross ===
Series	Driver	Season article
FIA European Rallycross Championship	Div 1: (Norway) Ludvig Hunsbedt	
FIA European Rallycross Championship	Div 2: (France) Jean-Luc Pailler	
FIA European Rallycross Championship	1400 Cup: (Belgium) Tony Kuypers	
British Rallycross Championship	(United Kingdom) Mike Turpin	

=== Ice racing ===
Series	Driver	Season article
Andros Trophy	(France) Dany Snobeck	1992–93 Andros Trophy

== Sports car and GT ==
Series	Driver	Season article
British GT Championship	Class A: (Australia) Charlie Cox	1993 British GT Championship
British GT Championship	Class B: (United Kingdom) Nigel Barrett	1993 British GT Championship
British GT Championship	Class C: (United Kingdom) John Greasley	1993 British GT Championship
British GT Championship	Class D: (Denmark) Thorkild Thyrring	1993 British GT Championship
IMSA GT Championship	GTP: (Argentina) Juan Manuel Fangio II	1993 IMSA GT Championship
IMSA GT Championship	Lights: (United States) Parker Johnstone	1993 IMSA GT Championship
IMSA GT Championship	GTS: (United States) Tommy Kendall	1993 IMSA GT Championship
IMSA GT Championship	GTO: (United States) Charles Morgan	1993 IMSA GT Championship
IMSA GT Championship	GTU: (United States) Butch Leitzinger	1993 IMSA GT Championship
Porsche Supercup, Porsche Carrera Cup, GT3 Cup Challenge and Porsche Sprint Challenge
Porsche Supercup	(Germany) Altfrid Heger	1993 Porsche Supercup
Porsche Supercup	Teams: (Germany) Porsche Zentrum Koblenz	1993 Porsche Supercup
Porsche Carrera Cup France	(France) Dominique Dupuy	1993 Porsche Carrera Cup France
Porsche Carrera Cup Germany	(Germany) Wolfgang Land	1993 Porsche Carrera Cup Germany
Porsche Carrera Cup Germany	Teams: (Germany) Roock Racing	1993 Porsche Carrera Cup Germany

== Stock car ==
Series	Driver	Season article
NASCAR Winston Cup Series	(United States) Dale Earnhardt	1993 NASCAR Winston Cup Series
NASCAR Winston Cup Series	Manufacturers: (United States) Chevrolet	1993 NASCAR Winston Cup Series
NASCAR Busch Grand National Series	(United States) Steve Grissom	1993 NASCAR Busch Series
NASCAR Busch Grand National Series	Manufacturers: (United States) Chevrolet	1993 NASCAR Busch Series
NASCAR Busch North Series	(United States) Dick McCabe	1993 NASCAR Busch North Series
NASCAR Winston West Series	(United States) Rick Carelli	1993 NASCAR Winston West Series
ARCA Bondo/Mar-Hyde Series	(United States) Tim Steele	1993 ARCA Bondo/Mar-Hyde Series
AUSCAR	(Australia) Brad Jones	1992–93 AUSCAR season
Australian Super Speedway Championship	(Australia) Max Dumesny	1992–93 Australian Super Speedway Championship
Turismo Carretera	(Argentina) Walter Hernández	1993 Turismo Carretera

== Touring car ==
Series	Driver	Season article
Australian Touring Car Championship	(Australia) Glenn Seton	1993 Australian Touring Car Championship
Australian Touring Car Championship	2.0 Litre: (Australia) Peter Doulman	1993 Australian Touring Car Championship
Australian 2.0 Litre Touring Car Championship	(Australia) Peter Doulman	1993 Australian 2.0 Litre Touring Car Championship
British Touring Car Championship	(Germany) Joachim Winkelhock	1993 British Touring Car Championship
British Touring Car Championship	Manufacturers: (Germany) BMW	1993 British Touring Car Championship
British Touring Car Championship	Independent: (United Kingdom) Matt Neal	1993 British Touring Car Championship
Campeonato Brasileiro de Marcas e Pilotos	(Brazil) Andreas Mattheis (Brazil) Paulo Judice	1993 Campeonato Brasileiro de Marcas e Pilotos
Deutsche Tourenwagen Meisterschaft	(Italy) Nicola Larini	1993 Deutsche Tourenwagen Meisterschaft
Europa Cup Renault Clio	(Italy) Salvatore Pirro	1993 Europa Cup Renault Clio
French Supertouring Championship	(Germany) Frank Biela	1993 French Supertouring Championship
French Supertouring Championship	Manufacturers: (Germany) Audi	1993 French Supertouring Championship
Italian Superturismo Championship	(Italy) Roberto Ravaglia	1993 Italian Superturismo Championship
Italian Superturismo Championship	Teams: (Italy) CiBiEmme Engineering	1993 Italian Superturismo Championship
Japanese Touring Car Championship	(Japan) Masahiko Kageyama	1993 Japanese Touring Car Championship
Japanese Touring Car Championship	JTC-2: (United Kingdom) Andrew Gilbert-Scott	1993 Japanese Touring Car Championship
Japanese Touring Car Championship	JTC-3: (Japan) Naoki Hattori	1993 Japanese Touring Car Championship
New Zealand Touring Car Championship	(New Zealand) Ed Lamont	1993 New Zealand Touring Car Championship
Spanish Touring Car Championship	(Spain) Luis Pérez-Sala	1993 Campeonato de España de Turismos
Spanish Touring Car Championship	Manufacturers: (Germany) BMW	1993 Campeonato de España de Turismos
Stock Car Brasil	(Brazil) Ingo Hoffmann	1993 Stock Car Brasil season
TC2000 Championship	(Argentina) Juan María Traverso	1993 TC2000 Championship

== Truck racing ==
Series	Driver	Season article
European Truck Racing Championship	Class A: (France) Gérard Cuynet	1993 European Truck Racing Championship
European Truck Racing Championship	Class B: (Finland) Harri Luostarinen	1993 European Truck Racing Championship
European Truck Racing Championship	Class C: (United Kingdom) Steve Parrish	1993 European Truck Racing Championship

== See also ==
- List of motorsport championships
- Auto racing
