= List of 1996 motorsport champions =

1996 motorsport champions
Previous: 1995	Next: 1997

This list of 1996 motorsport champions is a list of national or international auto racing series with a Championship decided by the points or positions earned by a driver from multiple races.

== Dirt oval racing ==
Series	Champion	Refer
World of Outlaws Sprint Car Series	(United States) Mark Kinser	
World of Outlaws Sprint Car Series	Teams: (United States) Karl Kinser Racing	

== Drag racing ==
Series	Champion	Refer
NHRA Winston Drag Racing Series	Top Fuel: (United States) Kenny Bernstein	1996 NHRA Winston Drag Racing Series
NHRA Winston Drag Racing Series	Funny Car: (United States) John Force	1996 NHRA Winston Drag Racing Series
NHRA Winston Drag Racing Series	Pro Stock: (United States) Jim Yates	1996 NHRA Winston Drag Racing Series
NHRA Winston Drag Racing Series	Pro Stock Motorcycle: (United States) Dave Schultz	1996 NHRA Winston Drag Racing Series

== Karting ==
Series	Driver	Season article
CIK-FIA Karting World Championship	FSA: (Sweden) Johnny Mislijevic	
CIK-FIA Karting World Championship	FC: (Italy) Gianluca Beggio	
CIK-FIA Five Continents Cup Junior A	(Spain) Fernando Alonso	
CIK-FIA Karting European Championship	FSA: (Sweden) Johnny Mislijevic	
CIK-FIA Karting European Championship	ICC: (Italy) Alessandro Piccini	
CIK-FIA Karting European Championship	FA: (Italy) Giorgio Pantano	
CIK-FIA Karting European Championship	ICA: (France) Ludovic Veve	
CIK-FIA Karting European Championship	ICA-J: (Italy) Marino Spinozzi	
CIK-FIA Karting European Championship	Cadet: (Netherlands) Nelson van der Pol	

== Motorcycle ==
Series	Rider	Season article
500cc World Championship	(Australia) Mick Doohan	1996 Grand Prix motorcycle racing season
250cc World Championship	(Italy) Max Biaggi	1996 Grand Prix motorcycle racing season
125cc World Championship	(Japan) Haruchika Aoki	1996 Grand Prix motorcycle racing season
Superbike World Championship	(Australia) Troy Corser	1996 Superbike World Championship season
Speedway World Championship	(United States) Billy Hamill	1996 Speedway Grand Prix
AMA Superbike Championship	(United States) Doug Chandler	
Australian Superbike Championship	(Australia) Peter Goddard	

== Open wheel racing ==
Series	Driver	Season article
FIA Formula One World Championship	(United Kingdom) Damon Hill	1996 Formula One World Championship
FIA Formula One World Championship	Constructors: (United Kingdom) Williams-Renault	1996 Formula One World Championship
FIA International Formula 3000	(Germany) Jörg Müller	1996 International Formula 3000 Championship
PPG Indy Car World Series	(United States) Jimmy Vasser	1996 PPG Indy Car World Series
PPG Indy Car World Series	Manufacturers: (Japan) Honda	1996 PPG Indy Car World Series
PPG Indy Car World Series	Rookies: (Italy) Alex Zanardi	1996 PPG Indy Car World Series
Indy Racing League	(United States) Scott Sharp / (United States) Buzz Calkins (tie)	1996 Indy Racing League
Indy Lights Series	(Canada) David Empringham	1996 Indy Lights season
American Indycar Series	(United States) Ken Petrie	1996 American Indycar Series
Atlantic Championship Series	(Canada) Patrick Carpentier	1996 Atlantic Championship
Australian Drivers' Championship	(Australia) Paul Stokell	1996 Australian Drivers' Championship
Barber Dodge Pro Series	(Sweden) Fredrik Larsson	1996 Barber Dodge Pro Series
British Formula Two Championship	(United Kingdom) Gareth Rees	1996 British Formula Two Championship
British Formula Two Championship	Teams: (United Kingdom) Super Nova Racing	1996 British Formula Two Championship
Formula Nippon Championship	(Germany) Ralf Schumacher	1996 Formula Nippon Championship
Formula Nippon Championship	Teams: X-Japan Le Mans	1996 Formula Nippon Championship
Historic Formula One Championship	(United Kingdom) Michael Schryver	1996 Historic Formula One Championship
BOSS Formula Series	(Sweden) Johan Rajamaki	1996 BOSS Formula Series
BOSS Formula Series	Teams: (Sweden) Rajamaki Racing	1996 BOSS Formula Series
Formula Asia	(India) Narain Karthikeyan	1996 Formula Asia
Formula König	(Germany) Thomas Mühlenz	1996 Formula König season
Formula König	Teams: (Germany) Kern Motorsport	1996 Formula König season
Formula Toyota	(Japan) Yasuhisa Fujiwara	1996 Formula Toyota season
Formula Toyota	West: (Japan) Shinya Kurushima	1996 Formula Toyota season
Russian Formula 1600 Championship	(Russia) Viktor Kozankov	1996 Russian Formula 1600 Championship
Russian Formula 1600 Championship	Teams: (Russia) West Canopus Castrol	1996 Russian Formula 1600 Championship
Star Mazda Championship	(United States) Rich Stephens	1996 Star Mazda Championship
U.S. F2000 National Championship	(United States) Steve Knapp	1996 U.S. F2000 National Championship
Formula Three
All-Japan Formula Three Championship	(Japan) Juichi Wakisaka	1996 All-Japan Formula Three Championship
All-Japan Formula Three Championship	Teams: (Japan) Nakajima Racing	1996 All-Japan Formula Three Championship
Austria Formula 3 Cup	(Austria) Josef Neuhauser	1996 Austria Formula 3 Cup
Austria Formula 3 Cup	Trophy: (Austria) Christian Windhofer	1996 Austria Formula 3 Cup
British Formula 3 Championship	(Republic of Ireland) Ralph Firman	1996 British Formula Three Championship
British Formula 3 Championship	Class B: (New Zealand) Simon Wills	1996 British Formula Three Championship
Chilean Formula Three Championship	(Chile) Ramón Ibarra	1996 Chilean Formula Three Championship
French Formula Three Championship	(France) Soheil Ayari	1996 French Formula Three Championship
French Formula Three Championship	Teams: (France) Graff Racing	1996 French Formula Three Championship
German Formula Three Championship	(Italy) Jarno Trulli	1996 German Formula Three Championship
German Formula Three Championship	Class B: (Sweden) Johan Stureson	1996 German Formula Three Championship
Italian Formula Three Championship	(Italy) Andrea Boldrini	1996 Italian Formula Three Championship
Italian Formula Three Championship	Teams: (Italy) RC Motorsport	1996 Italian Formula Three Championship
Mexican Formula Three Championship	(United Kingdom) Rod MacLeod	1996 Mexican Formula Three Championship
Formula 3 Sudamericana	(Argentina) Gabriel Furlán	1996 Formula 3 Sudamericana
Formula 3 Sudamericana	National: (Argentina) Anibal Zaniratto	1996 Formula 3 Sudamericana
Swiss Formula Three Championship	(Switzerland) Norbert Zehnder	1996 Swiss Formula Three Championship
Formula Renault
French Formula Renault Championship	(France) Sébastien Enjolras	1996 French Formula Renault Championship
Eurocup Formula Renault	(Brazil) Enrique Bernoldi	
Eurocup Formula Renault	Teams: (Italy) JD Motorsport	
Formula Renault Argentina	(Argentina) Martín Basso	1996 Formula Renault Argentina
Formula Renault Sport UK	(United Kingdom) David Cook	1996 Formula Renault Sport UK
Formula Renault Sport UK	Teams: (United Kingdom) DCCook Racing	1996 Formula Renault Sport UK
Formula Renault BARC	(United Kingdom) Ian Astley	1996 Formula Renault BARC
Formula Renault Germany	(Germany) Alexander Müller	1996 Formula Renault Germany
Spanish Formula Renault Championship	(Portugal) Bruno Correia	1996 Spanish Formula Renault Championship
Formula Ford
Australian Formula Ford Championship	(Australia) David Besnard	1996 Australian Formula Ford Championship
Austrian Formula Ford Championship	(Austria) Robert Lechner	
Benelux Formula Ford 1800 Championship	(Netherlands) Sebastiaan Bleekemolen	
Benelux Formula Ford 1600 Championship	(Denmark) Allan Berndt	
British Formula Ford Championship	(Denmark) Kristian Kolby	1996 British Formula Ford Championship
Danish Formula Ford Championship	(Denmark) Tommy Schröter	
Dutch Formula Ford 1800 Championship	(Netherlands) Sebastiaan Bleekemolen	
Dutch Formula Ford 1600 Championship	(Denmark) Allan Berndt	
Finnish Formula Ford Championship	(Finland) Kari Mäenpää	
New Zealand Formula Ford Championship	(New Zealand) Greg Tullett	
Formula Ford 1600 Nordic Championship	(Finland) Janne Koistinen	
Scottish Formula Ford Championship	(United Kingdom) Jim Forsyth	

== Rallying ==
Series	Driver/Co-Driver	Season article
World Rally Championship	(Finland) Tommi Mäkinen	1996 World Rally Championship
World Rally Championship	Co-Drivers: (Finland) Seppo Harjanne	1996 World Rally Championship
World Rally Championship	Manufacturer: (Japan) Subaru	1996 World Rally Championship
FIA Cup for Production Cars	(Uruguay) Gustavo Trelles	1996 World Rally Championship
African Rally Championship	(Zambia) Satwant Singh	1996 African Rally Championship
Asia-Pacific Rally Championship	(Sweden) Kenneth Eriksson	1996 Asia-Pacific Rally Championship
Asia-Pacific Rally Championship	Co-Drivers: (Sweden) Staffan Parmander	1996 Asia-Pacific Rally Championship
Asia-Pacific Rally Championship	Manufacturers: (Japan) Mitsubishi	1996 Asia-Pacific Rally Championship
Asia-Pacific Rally Championship	Group N: (Japan) Yoshihiro Kataoka	1996 Asia-Pacific Rally Championship
Asia-Pacific Rally Championship	2-Litre: (Japan) Nobuhiro Tajima	1996 Asia-Pacific Rally Championship
Australian Rally Championship	(New Zealand) Possum Bourne	1996 Australian Rally Championship
Australian Rally Championship	Co-Drivers: (Australia) Craig Vincent	1996 Australian Rally Championship
British Rally Championship	(United Kingdom) Gwyndaf Evans	1996 British Rally Championship
British Rally Championship	Co-Drivers: (United Kingdom) Howard Davies	1996 British Rally Championship
Canadian Rally Championship	(Canada) Carl Merrill	1996 Canadian Rally Championship
Canadian Rally Championship	Co-Drivers: (Canada) Yorgi Bittner	1996 Canadian Rally Championship
Czech Rally Championship	(Czech Republic) Ladislav Křeček	1996 Czech Rally Championship
Czech Rally Championship	Co-Drivers: (Czech Republic) Jan Krečman	1996 Czech Rally Championship
Deutsche Rallye Meisterschaft	(Germany) Armin Kremer	
Estonian Rally Championship	N 2000+: (Estonia) Ivar Raidam	1996 Estonian Rally Championship
Estonian Rally Championship	N 2000+ Co-Drivers: (Estonia) Margus Karjane	1996 Estonian Rally Championship
Estonian Rally Championship	A>2000: (Estonia) Raido Rüütel	1996 Estonian Rally Championship
Estonian Rally Championship	A>2000 Co-Drivers: (Estonia) Robert Lepikson	1996 Estonian Rally Championship
European Rally Championship	(Germany) Armin Schwarz	1996 European Rally Championship
European Rally Championship	Co-Drivers: (France) Denis Giraudet	1996 European Rally Championship
Finnish Rally Championship	Group A +2000cc: (Finland) Marcus Grönholm	1996 Finnish Rally Championship
Finnish Rally Championship	Group N +2000cc: (Finland) Jouko Puhakka	1996 Finnish Rally Championship
Finnish Rally Championship	Group A -2000cc: (Finland) Tapio Laukkanen	1996 Finnish Rally Championship
Finnish Rally Championship	Group N -2000cc: (Finland) Harri Rämänen	1996 Finnish Rally Championship
French Rally Championship	(France) Gilles Panizzi	
Hungarian Rally Championship	(Hungary) János Tóth	
Hungarian Rally Championship	Co-Drivers: (Hungary) Ferenc Gergely	
Indian National Rally Championship	(India) Hari Singh	
Indian National Rally Championship	Co-Drivers: (India) Gurinder Singh Mann	
Italian Rally Championship	(Italy) Gianfranco Cunico	
Italian Rally Championship	Co-Drivers: (Italy) Pierangelo Scalvini	
Italian Rally Championship	Manufacturers: (United States) Ford	
Middle East Rally Championship	(United Arab Emirates) Mohammed Ben Sulayem	
New Zealand Rally Championship	(New Zealand) Joe McAndrew	1996 New Zealand Rally Championship
New Zealand Rally Championship	Co-Drivers: (New Zealand) Robert Haldane	1996 New Zealand Rally Championship
Polish Rally Championship	(Poland) Krzysztof Hołowczyc	
Romanian Rally Championship	(Romania) George Grigorescu	
Scottish Rally Championship	(United Kingdom) Jimmy Christie	
Scottish Rally Championship	Co-Drivers: (United Kingdom) Murdo Campbell	
Slovak Rally Championship	(Czech Republic) Stanislav Chovanec	
Slovak Rally Championship	Co-Drivers: (Czech Republic) Henrich Kurus	
South African National Rally Championship	(Belgium) Serge Damseaux	
South African National Rally Championship	Co-Drivers: (South Africa) Vito Bonafede	
South African National Rally Championship	Manufacturers: (Germany) Volkswagen	
Spanish Rally Championship	(Spain) Luis Climent	
Spanish Rally Championship	Co-Drivers: (Spain) Alex Romaní	

=== Rallycross ===
Series	Driver	Season article
FIA European Rallycross Championship	Div 1: (Norway) Eivind Opland	
FIA European Rallycross Championship	Div 2: (Sweden) Kenneth Hansen	
FIA European Rallycross Championship	1400 Cup: (Austria) Manfred Beck	
British Rallycross Championship	(United Kingdom) Will Gollop	

=== Ice racing ===
Series	Driver	Season article
Andros Trophy	Elite: (France) Yvan Muller	1995–96 Andros Trophy
Andros Trophy	Promotion: (France) James Ruffier	1995–96 Andros Trophy
Andros Trophy	Dame: (France) Caroline Barclay	1995–96 Andros Trophy

== Sports car ==
Series	Driver	Season article
British GT Championship	GT1: (United Kingdom) Ian Flux; GT1: (United States) Jake Ulrich	1996 British GT Championship
British GT Championship	GT2: (United Kingdom) David Warnock; GT2: (United Kingdom) Robert Schirle	1996 British GT Championship
British GT Championship	GT3: (United Kingdom) Ken Thomson	1996 British GT Championship
IMSA WSC Championship	(South Africa) Wayne Taylor	1996 IMSA GT Championship
IMSA GT Championship	GTS-1: (United States) Irv Hoerr	1996 IMSA GT Championship
IMSA GT Championship	GTS-2: (United States) Larry Schumacher	1996 IMSA GT Championship
BPR Global GT Series	(United Kingdom) Ray Bellm (United Kingdom) James Weaver	1996 BPR Global GT Series season
BPR Global GT Series	Teams: (United Kingdom) GTC Competition	1996 BPR Global GT Series season
Porsche Supercup, Porsche Carrera Cup, GT3 Cup Challenge and Porsche Sprint Challenge
Porsche Supercup	(France) Emmanuel Collard	1996 Porsche Supercup
Porsche Supercup	Teams: (Germany) Oberbayern Motorsport	1996 Porsche Supercup
Porsche Carrera Cup France	(France) Christophe Bouchut	1996 Porsche Carrera Cup France
Porsche Carrera Cup Germany	(Germany) Ralf Kelleners	1996 Porsche Carrera Cup Germany
Porsche Carrera Cup Germany	Teams: (Germany) Porsche Zentrum Koblenz	1996 Porsche Carrera Cup Germany

== Stock car ==
Series	Driver	Season article
NASCAR Winston Cup Series	(United States) Terry Labonte	1996 NASCAR Winston Cup Series
NASCAR Winston Cup Series	Manufacturers: (United States) Chevrolet	1996 NASCAR Winston Cup Series
NASCAR Busch Grand National Series	(United States) Randy LaJoie	1996 NASCAR Busch Series
NASCAR Busch Grand National Series	Manufacturers: (United States) Chevrolet	1996 NASCAR Busch Series
NASCAR Craftsman Truck Series	(United States) Ron Hornaday Jr.	1996 NASCAR Craftsman Truck Series
NASCAR Craftsman Truck Series	Manufacturers: (United States) Chevrolet	1996 NASCAR Craftsman Truck Series
NASCAR Busch North Series	(United States) Dave Dion	1996 NASCAR Busch North Series
NASCAR Winston West Series	(United States) Lance Hooper	1996 NASCAR Winston West Series
ARCA Bondo/Mar-Hyde Series	(United States) Tim Steele	1996 ARCA Bondo/Mar-Hyde Series
AUSCAR	(Australia) Terry Wyhoon	1995–96 AUSCAR season
Australian Super Speedway Championship	(New Zealand) Jim Richards	1995–96 Australian Super Speedway Championship
Turismo Carretera	(Argentina) Juan María Traverso	1996 Turismo Carretera

== Touring car ==
Series	Driver	Season article
ADAC Procar Series	(Germany) Jürgen Hohenester	1996 ADAC Procar Series
ADAC Procar Series	Teams: (Germany) Hohenester Motorsport	1996 ADAC Procar Series
Australian Touring Car Championship	(Australia) Craig Lowndes	1996 Australian Touring Car Championship
Australian Super Touring Championship	(Australia) Brad Jones	1996 Australian Super Touring Championship
Australian Super Touring Championship	Teams: Audi Sport Australia	1996 Australian Super Touring Championship
Australian Super Touring Championship	Manufacturers: (Germany) Audi	1996 Australian Super Touring Championship
Belgian Procar Championship	(Belgium) Jean François Hemroulle	1996 Belgian Procar Championship
Belgian Procar Championship	Manufacturers: (Germany) Audi	1996 Belgian Procar Championship
British Touring Car Championship	(Germany) Frank Biela	1996 British Touring Car Championship
British Touring Car Championship	Teams: (United Kingdom) Audi Sport UK	1996 British Touring Car Championship
British Touring Car Championship	Manufacturers: (Germany) Audi	1996 British Touring Car Championship
British Touring Car Championship	Privateers: (United Kingdom) Lee Brookes	1996 British Touring Car Championship
Finnish Touring Car Championship	(Finland) Toni Rasmus Ruokonen	
French Supertouring Championship	(France) Éric Cayrolle	1996 French Supertouring Championship
French Supertouring Championship	Criterium Trophy: (France) Bruno Hernandez	1996 French Supertouring Championship
International Touring Car Championship	(Germany) Manuel Reuter	1996 International Touring Car Championship
International Touring Car Championship	Manufacturers: (Germany) Opel	1996 International Touring Car Championship
Italian Superturismo Championship	(Italy) Rinaldo Capello	1996 Italian Superturismo Championship
Italian Superturismo Championship	Teams: (Italy) CiBiEmme Engineering	1996 Italian Superturismo Championship
Japanese Touring Car Championship	(Japan) Naoki Hattori	1996 Japanese Touring Car Championship
Japanese Touring Car Championship	Teams: (Japan) Toyota Team TOM's	1996 Japanese Touring Car Championship
New Zealand Touring Car Championship	(New Zealand) Craig Baird	1996 New Zealand Touring Car Championship
North American Touring Car Championship	(United States) Randy Pobst	1996 North American Touring Car Championship
North American Touring Car Championship	Manufacturers: (Japan) Honda	1996 North American Touring Car Championship
Renault Sport Spider Elf Trophy	(France) Franck Lagorce	1996 Renault Sport Spider Elf Trophy
Spanish Supertouring Championship	(Spain) Jordi Gené	1996 Campeonato de España de Superturismos
Spanish Supertouring Championship	Manufacturers: (Germany) Audi	1996 Campeonato de España de Superturismos
Stock Car Brasil	(Brazil) Ingo Hoffmann	1996 Stock Car Brasil season
Swedish Touring Car Championship	(Sweden) Jan Nilsson	1996 Swedish Touring Car Championship
TC2000 Championship	(Argentina) Ernesto Bessone	1996 TC2000 Championship

== Truck racing ==
Series	Driver	Season article
European Truck Racing Championship	Super-Race-Trucks: (United Kingdom) Steve Parrish	1996 European Truck Racing Championship
European Truck Racing Championship	Race-Trucks: (Czech Republic) Martin Koloc	1996 European Truck Racing Championship
Fórmula Truck	(Brazil) Renato Martins	1996 Fórmula Truck
Fórmula Truck	Teams: (Brazil) Marfran	1996 Fórmula Truck

== See also ==
- List of motorsport championships
- Auto racing
