= List of 1992 motorsport champions =

1992 motorsport champions
Previous: 1991	Next: 1993

This list of 1992 motorsport champions is a list of national or international auto racing series with a Championship decided by the points or positions earned by a driver from multiple races.

== Dirt oval racing ==
Series	Champion	Refer
World of Outlaws Sprint Car Series	(United States) Steve Kinser	
World of Outlaws Sprint Car Series	Teams: (United States) Karl Kinser Racing	

== Drag racing ==
Series	Champion	Refer
NHRA Winston Drag Racing Series	Top Fuel: (United States) Joe Amato	1992 NHRA Winston Drag Racing Series
NHRA Winston Drag Racing Series	Funny Car: (United States) Cruz Pedregon	1992 NHRA Winston Drag Racing Series
NHRA Winston Drag Racing Series	Pro Stock: (United States) Warren Johnson	1992 NHRA Winston Drag Racing Series
NHRA Winston Drag Racing Series	Pro Stock Motorcycle: (United States) John Myers	1992 NHRA Winston Drag Racing Series

== Karting ==
Series	Driver	Season article
CIK-FIA Karting World Championship	FK: (Italy) Danilo Rossi	
CIK-FIA Karting World Championship	Formula A: (Italy) Nicola Gianniberti	
CIK-FIA Karting World Championship	FC: (Italy) Danilo Rossi	
CIK-FIA Five Continents Cup Junior A	(Italy) Bruno Balocco	
CIK-FIA Karting European Championship	FK: (Italy) Gianluca Beggio	
CIK-FIA Karting European Championship	ICC: (Italy) Stefano Rodano	
CIK-FIA Karting European Championship	FA: (Italy) Daniele Parrilla	
CIK-FIA Karting European Championship	ICA: (Italy) Oliver Fiorucci	
CIK-FIA Karting European Championship	ICA-J: (Italy) Massimo de Col	
CIK-FIA Karting European Championship	Cadet: (Italy) Ennio Gandolfi	
World Superkart Championship	(United Kingdom) Martin Hines	

== Motorcycle racing ==
Series	Rider	Season article
500cc World Championship	(United States) Wayne Rainey	1992 Grand Prix motorcycle racing season
250cc World Championship	(Italy) Luca Cadalora	1992 Grand Prix motorcycle racing season
125cc World Championship	(Italy) Alessandro Gramigni	1992 Grand Prix motorcycle racing season
Superbike World Championship	(United States) Doug Polen	1992 Superbike World Championship season
Speedway World Championship	(United Kingdom) Gary Havelock	1992 Individual Speedway World Championship
AMA Superbike Championship	(United States) Scott Russell	
Australian Superbike Championship	(Australia) Mat Mladin	

== Open wheel racing ==
Series	Driver	Season article
FIA Formula One World Championship	(United Kingdom) Nigel Mansell	1992 Formula One World Championship
FIA Formula One World Championship	Constructors: (United Kingdom) Williams-Renault	1992 Formula One World Championship
PPG Indy Car World Series	(United States) Bobby Rahal	1992 PPG Indy Car World Series
PPG Indy Car World Series	Manufacturers: (United States) Chevrolet	1992 PPG Indy Car World Series
PPG Indy Car World Series	Rookies: (Sweden) Stefan Johansson	1992 PPG Indy Car World Series
Indy Lights Series	(United States) Robbie Buhl	1992 Indy Lights season
International Formula 3000	(Italy) Luca Badoer	1992 International Formula 3000 season
All-Japan Formula 3000 Championship	(Italy) Mauro Martini	1992 Japanese Formula 3000 Championship
British Formula Two Championship	(France) Yvan Muller	1992 British Formula Two Championship
American Indycar Series	(United States) Rod Bennett	1992 American Indycar Series
Toyota Atlantic Championship	(United States) Chris Smith	1992 Atlantic Championship
Australian Drivers' Championship	(Australia) Mark Skaife	1992 Australian Drivers' Championship
Barber Saab Pro Series	(Sweden) Robert Amren	1992 Barber Saab Pro Series
Formula Crane 45	(Japan) Tetsuji Tamanaka	1992 Formula Crane 45 season
Formula König	(Germany) Marian Hamprecht	1992 Formula König season
Formula König	Teams: (Germany) H&R Spezialfedern	1992 Formula König season
Formula Toyota	(Japan) Tomoyuki Hosono	1992 Formula Toyota season
Formula Toyota	West: (Japan) Masayuki Yamamoto	1992 Formula Toyota season
SCCA American Continental Championship	(United States) Greg Ray	1992 SCCA American Continental Championship
Star Mazda Championship	(United States) Chuck West	1992 Star Mazda Championship
USAC FF2000 Western Division Championship	(Canada) Greg Moore	1992 USAC FF2000 Western Division Championship
USAC FF2000 Eastern Division Championship	(United States) Chris Simmons	1992 USAC FF2000 Eastern Division Championship
Formula Three
All-Japan Formula Three Championship	(United Kingdom) Anthony Reid	1992 All-Japan Formula Three Championship
All-Japan Formula Three Championship	Teams: (Japan) Tomei Sport	1992 All-Japan Formula Three Championship
Austria Formula 3 Cup	(Austria) Philipp Peter	1992 Austria Formula 3 Cup
Brazilian Formula Three Championship	(Brazil) Marcos Gueiros	1992 Brazilian Formula Three Championship
Brazilian Formula Three Championship	Teams: (Brazil) Césario Fórmula	1992 Brazilian Formula Three Championship
British Formula Three Championship	(Brazil) Gil de Ferran	1992 British Formula Three Championship
British Formula Three Championship	National: (United Kingdom) Paul Evans	1992 British Formula Three Championship
Chilean Formula Three Championship	(Chile) Giuseppe Bacigalupo	1992 Chilean Formula Three Championship
French Formula Three Championship	(France) Franck Lagorce	1992 French Formula Three Championship
French Formula Three Championship	Teams: (France) Promatecme	1992 French Formula Three Championship
German Formula Three Championship	(Portugal) Pedro Lamy	1992 German Formula Three Championship
German Formula Three Championship	B: (Germany) Christian Abt	1992 German Formula Three Championship
Italian Formula Three Championship	(Italy) Max Angelelli	1992 Italian Formula Three Championship
Italian Formula Three Championship	Teams: (Italy) RC Motorsport	1992 Italian Formula Three Championship
Mexican Formula Three Championship	(Mexico) César Tiberio Jiménez	1992 Mexican Formula Three Championship
Formula 3 Sudamericana	(Brazil) Marcos Gueiros	1992 Formula 3 Sudamericana
Formula 3 Sudamericana	National: (Brazil) Suzane Carvalho	1992 Formula 3 Sudamericana
Swiss Formula Three Championship	(Switzerland) Jo Zeller	1992 Swiss Formula Three Championship
Formula Renault
French Formula Renault Championship	(France) Jean-Philippe Belloc	1992 French Formula Renault Championship
Formula Renault Argentina	(Argentina) Norberto Della Santina	1992 Formula Renault Argentina
Formula Renault Germany	(Germany) Thomas Wöhrle	1992 Formula Renault Germany
Rencontres Internationales de Formule Renault	(Spain) Pedro de la Rosa	
Rencontres Internationales de Formule Renault	Teams: Racing for Spain	
Formula Renault Sport UK	(Spain) Pedro de la Rosa	1992 Formula Renault Sport UK
Formula Renault Sport UK	Teams: Racing for Spain-Minister	1992 Formula Renault Sport UK
Spanish Formula Renault Championship	(Spain) Ricardo García Galiano	1992 Spanish Formula Renault Championship
Formula Ford
Australian Formula Ford Championship	(Australia) Cameron McConville	1992 Motorcraft Formula Ford Driver to Europe Series
Brazilian Formula Ford Championship	(Brazil) Norio Matsubara	1992 Brazilian Formula Ford Championship
British Formula Ford Championship	(United Kingdom) Jamie Spence	1992 British Formula Ford Championship
Danish Formula Ford Championship	(Denmark) Brian Taulborg	
Dutch Formula Ford 1600 Championship	(Belgium) Kurt Mollekens	1992 Dutch Formula Ford 1600 Championship
Formula Mirage	(Japan) Osamu Hagiwara	
Finnish Formula Ford Championship	(Finland) Kalle Jokinen	
German Formula Ford Championship	(Austria) Alexander Wurz	
New Zealand Formula Ford Championship	(New Zealand) Gary Croft	
Formula Ford 1600 Nordic Championship	(Sweden) Thomas Johansson	
Spanish Formula Ford Championship	(Spain) David Bosch	
Swedish Formula Ford Championship	(Sweden) Peter Åslund	

== Rallying ==
Series	Driver/Co-Driver	Season article
World Rally Championship	(Spain) Carlos Sainz	1992 World Rally Championship
World Rally Championship	Co-Drivers: (Spain) Luis Moya	1992 World Rally Championship
World Rally Championship	Manufacturer: (Italy) Lancia	1992 World Rally Championship
FIA Cup for Production Cars	(Belgium) Grégoire De Mévius	1992 World Rally Championship
African Rally Championship	(Italy) Aldo Riva	1992 African Rally Championship
Asia-Pacific Rally Championship	(Australia) Ross Dunkerton	1992 Asia-Pacific Rally Championship
Asia-Pacific Rally Championship	Co-Drivers: (Lithuania) Fred Gocentas	1992 Asia-Pacific Rally Championship
Australian Rally Championship	(Australia) Robert Herridge	1992 Australian Rally Championship
Australian Rally Championship	Co-Drivers: (Australia) Mark Nelson	1992 Australian Rally Championship
British Rally Championship	(United Kingdom) Colin McRae	1992 British Rally Championship
British Rally Championship	Co-Drivers: (United Kingdom) Derek Ringer	1992 British Rally Championship
Canadian Rally Championship	(Canada) Tom McGeer	1992 Canadian Rally Championship
Canadian Rally Championship	Co-Drivers: (Canada) Trish Sparrow	1992 Canadian Rally Championship
Deutsche Rallye Meisterschaft	(Germany) Dieter Depping	
Estonian Rally Championship	(Estonia) Ivar Raidam	1992 Estonian Rally Championship
Estonian Rally Championship	Co-Drivers: (Estonia) Margus Karjane	1992 Estonian Rally Championship
European Rally Championship	(Germany) Erwin Weber	1992 European Rally Championship
European Rally Championship	Co-Drivers: (Germany) Manfred Hiemer	1992 European Rally Championship
Finnish Rally Championship	Group A +2000cc: (Finland) Esa Saarenpää	1992 Finnish Rally Championship
Finnish Rally Championship	Group N +2000cc: (Finland) Jarmo Kytölehto	1992 Finnish Rally Championship
Finnish Rally Championship	Group A -2000cc: (Finland) Mika Kelkkanen	1992 Finnish Rally Championship
Finnish Rally Championship	Group N -2000cc: (Finland) Jukka Mäenpää	1992 Finnish Rally Championship
French Rally Championship	(France) Bernard Béguin	
Hungarian Rally Championship	(Hungary) László Ranga	
Hungarian Rally Championship	Co-Drivers: (Hungary) Ernő Büki	
Indian National Rally Championship	(India) N. Leelakrishnan	
Indian National Rally Championship	Co-Drivers: (India) N. Mahindran	
Italian Rally Championship	(Italy) Piergiorgio Deila	
Italian Rally Championship	Co-Drivers: (Italy) Pierangelo Scalvini	
Italian Rally Championship	Manufacturers: (Italy) Lancia	
Middle East Rally Championship	(Saudi Arabia) Mamdouh Khayat	
New Zealand Rally Championship	(New Zealand) Neil Allport	1992 New Zealand Rally Championship
New Zealand Rally Championship	Co-Drivers: (New Zealand) Jim Robb	1992 New Zealand Rally Championship
Polish Rally Championship	(Poland) Marian Bublewicz	
Romanian Rally Championship	(Romania) Dorin Toma	
Scottish Rally Championship	(United Kingdom) Raymond Munro	
Scottish Rally Championship	Co-Drivers: (United Kingdom) Neil Ewing	
South African National Rally Championship	(Belgium) Serge Damseaux	
South African National Rally Championship	Co-Drivers: (South Africa) Vito Bonafede	
South African National Rally Championship	Manufacturers: (Germany) Volkswagen	
Spanish Rally Championship	(Spain) Jesús Puras	
Spanish Rally Championship	Co-Drivers: (Spain) José Arrarte	

=== Rallycross ===
Series	Driver	Season article
FIA European Rallycross Championship	Div 1: (Sweden) Kenneth Hansen	
FIA European Rallycross Championship	Div 2: (United Kingdom) Will Gollop	
British Rallycross Championship	(United Kingdom) Denis Biggerstaff	

=== Ice racing ===
Series	Driver	Season article
Andros Trophy	(France) Dany Snobeck	1991–92 Andros Trophy

== Sports car and GT ==
Series	Driver	Season article
World Sportscar Championship	(France) Yannick Dalmas (United Kingdom) Derek Warwick	1992 World Sportscar Championship season
World Sportscar Championship	Teams: (France) Peugeot Talbot Sport	1992 World Sportscar Championship season
FIA Cup	(France) Ferdinand de Lesseps	1992 World Sportscar Championship season
FIA Cup	Teams: (United Kingdom) Chamberlain Engineering	1992 World Sportscar Championship season
IMSA GT Championship	GTP: (Argentina) Juan Manuel Fangio II	1992 IMSA GT Championship season
IMSA GT Championship	Lights: (United States) Parker Johnstone	1992 IMSA GT Championship season
IMSA GT Championship	GTS: (New Zealand) Steve Millen	1992 IMSA GT Championship season
IMSA GT Championship	GTO: (United States) Irv Hoerr	1992 IMSA GT Championship season
IMSA GT Championship	GTU: (United States) David Loring	1992 IMSA GT Championship season
Porsche Supercup, Porsche Carrera Cup, GT3 Cup Challenge and Porsche Sprint Challenge
Porsche Carrera Cup France	(France) Dominique Dupuy	1992 Porsche Carrera Cup France
Porsche Carrera Cup Germany	(Germany) Uwe Alzen	1992 Porsche Carrera Cup Germany
Porsche Carrera Cup Germany	Teams: (Germany) Porsche Zentrum Koblenz	1992 Porsche Carrera Cup Germany

== Stock car racing ==
Series	Driver	Season article
NASCAR Winston Cup Series	(United States) Alan Kulwicki	1992 NASCAR Winston Cup Series
NASCAR Winston Cup Series	Manufacturers: (United States) Ford	1992 NASCAR Winston Cup Series
NASCAR Busch Grand National Series	(United States) Joe Nemechek	1992 NASCAR Busch Series
NASCAR Busch Grand National Series	Manufacturers: (United States) Chevrolet	1992 NASCAR Busch Series
NASCAR Busch North Series	(United States) Dick McCabe	1992 NASCAR Busch North Series
NASCAR Winston West Series	(United States) Bill Sedgwick	1992 NASCAR Winston West Series
ARCA Bondo/Mar-Hyde Series	(United States) Bobby Bowsher	1992 ARCA Bondo/Mar-Hyde Series
International Race of Champions	(United States) Ricky Rudd	IROC XVI
AUSCAR	(Australia) Brad Jones	1991–92 AUSCAR season
Australian Super Speedway Championship	(Australia) George Elliot	1991–92 Australian Super Speedway Championship
Turismo Carretera	(Argentina) Oscar Aventín	1992 Turismo Carretera

== Touring car ==
Series	Driver	Season article
Australian Touring Car Championship	(Australia) Mark Skaife	1992 Australian Touring Car Championship
British Touring Car Championship	(United Kingdom) Tim Harvey	1992 British Touring Car Championship
British Touring Car Championship	Manufacturers: (United Kingdom) Vauxhall	1992 British Touring Car Championship
British Touring Car Championship	Independent: (United Kingdom) James Kaye	1992 British Touring Car Championship
Campeonato Brasileiro de Marcas e Pilotos	(Brazil) Andreas Mattheis (Brazil) Paulo Judice	1992 Campeonato Brasileiro de Marcas e Pilotos
Deutsche Tourenwagen Meisterschaft	(Germany) Klaus Ludwig	1992 Deutsche Tourenwagen Meisterschaft
Europa Cup Renault Clio	(France) Bernard Castagne	1992 Europa Cup Renault Clio
French Supertouring Championship	(France) Marc Sourd	
Italian Superturismo Championship	(Italy) Nicola Larini	1992 Italian Superturismo Championship
Italian Superturismo Championship	Teams: (Italy) Alfa Corse	1992 Italian Superturismo Championship
Japanese Touring Car Championship	(Japan) Masahiro Hasemi	1992 Japanese Touring Car Championship
Japanese Touring Car Championship	JTC-2: (Japan) Kazuo Mogi	1992 Japanese Touring Car Championship
Japanese Touring Car Championship	JTC-3: (Japan) Osamu Nakako	1992 Japanese Touring Car Championship
New Zealand Touring Car Championship	(New Zealand) Graeme Crosby	
Spanish Touring Car Championship	(Spain) Juan Ignacio Villacieros	1992 Campeonato de España de Turismos
Spanish Touring Car Championship	Manufacturers: (Germany) BMW	1992 Campeonato de España de Turismos
Stock Car Brasil	(Brazil) Ingo Hoffmann	1992 Stock Car Brasil season
TC2000 Championship	(Argentina) Juan María Traverso	1992 TC2000 Championship

== Truck racing ==
Series	Driver	Season article
European Truck Racing Championship	Class A: (United Kingdom) Richard Walker	1992 European Truck Racing Championship
European Truck Racing Championship	Class B: (Finland) Jokke Kallio	1992 European Truck Racing Championship
European Truck Racing Championship	Class C: (United Kingdom) Steve Parrish	1992 European Truck Racing Championship

== See also ==
- List of motorsport championships
- Auto racing
