= List of 1995 motorsport champions =

1995 motorsport champions
Previous: 1994	Next: 1996

This list of 1995 motorsport champions is a list of national or international auto racing series with a Championship decided by the points or positions earned by a driver from multiple races.

== Dirt oval racing ==
Series	Champion	Refer
World of Outlaws Sprint Car Series	(United States) Dave Blaney	
World of Outlaws Sprint Car Series	Teams: (United States) Casey Luna Ford Racing	

== Drag racing ==
Series	Champion	Refer
NHRA Winston Drag Racing Series	Top Fuel: (United States) Scott Kalitta	1995 NHRA Winston Drag Racing Series
NHRA Winston Drag Racing Series	Funny Car: (United States) John Force	1995 NHRA Winston Drag Racing Series
NHRA Winston Drag Racing Series	Pro Stock: (United States) Warren Johnson	1995 NHRA Winston Drag Racing Series
NHRA Winston Drag Racing Series	Pro Stock Motorcycle: (United States) John Myers	1995 NHRA Winston Drag Racing Series

== Karting ==
Series	Driver	Season article
CIK-FIA Karting World Championship	FSA: (Italy) Max Orsini	
CIK-FIA Karting World Championship	Formula A: (Brazil) Gastao Fraguas	
CIK-FIA Karting World Championship	FC: (Italy) Gianluca Beggio	
CIK-FIA Five Continents Cup Junior A	(Australia) James Courtney	
CIK-FIA Karting European Championship	FSA: (Italy) Massimiliano Orsini	
CIK-FIA Karting European Championship	ICC: (Italy) Paolo Gagliardini	
CIK-FIA Karting European Championship	FA: (Italy) Giorgio Pantano	
CIK-FIA Karting European Championship	ICA: (France) Arnaud Leconte	
CIK-FIA Karting European Championship	ICA-J: (Netherlands) Willemjan Keijzer	
World Superkart Championship	(United Kingdom) Trevor Roberts	

== Motorcycle ==
Series	Rider	Season article
500cc World Championship	(Australia) Mick Doohan	1995 Grand Prix motorcycle racing season
250cc World Championship	(Italy) Max Biaggi	1995 Grand Prix motorcycle racing season
125cc World Championship	(Japan) Haruchika Aoki	1995 Grand Prix motorcycle racing season
Superbike World Championship	(United Kingdom) Carl Fogarty	1995 Superbike World Championship season
Speedway World Championship	(Denmark) Hans Nielsen	1995 Speedway Grand Prix
AMA Superbike Championship	(Canada) Miguel Duhamel	
Australian Superbike Championship	(Australia) Kirk McCarthy	

== Open wheel racing ==
Series	Driver	Season article
FIA Formula One World Championship	(Germany) Michael Schumacher	1995 Formula One World Championship
FIA Formula One World Championship	Constructors: (United Kingdom) Benetton-Renault	1995 Formula One World Championship
PPG Indy Car World Series	(Canada) Jacques Villeneuve	1995 PPG Indy Car World Series
PPG Indy Car World Series	Manufacturers: (United States) Ford	1995 PPG Indy Car World Series
PPG Indy Car World Series	Rookies: (Brazil) Gil de Ferran	1995 PPG Indy Car World Series
Indy Lights Series	(Canada) Greg Moore	1995 Indy Lights season
International Formula 3000	(Italy) Vincenzo Sospiri	1995 International Formula 3000 season
FIA Historic Formula One Championship	(United Kingdom) Martin Stretton	1995 Historic Formula One Championship
All-Japan Formula 3000 Championship	(Japan) Toshio Suzuki	1995 Japanese Formula 3000 Championship
American Indycar Series	(United States) Bill Tempero	1995 American Indycar Series
Atlantic Championship	(United States) Richie Hearn	1995 Atlantic Championship
Australian Drivers' Championship	(Australia) Paul Stokell	1995 Australian Drivers' Championship
BOSS Formula Series	(Germany) Klaus Panchyrz	1995 BOSS Formula Series
BOSS Formula Series	Teams: (Germany) Mönninghoff Racing	1995 BOSS Formula Series
Barber Dodge Pro Series	(South Africa) Jaki Scheckter	1995 Barber Dodge Pro Series
Formula König	(Australia) Richard McLeod	1995 Formula König season
Formula König	Teams: (Germany) Schlag Rennsport	1995 Formula König season
Formula Toyota	(Japan) Takahiro Fujita	1995 Formula Toyota season
Formula Toyota	West: (Japan) Yuji Tachikawa	1995 Formula Toyota season
Star Mazda Championship	(United States) Mark Rodriguez	1995 Star Mazda Championship
U.S. F2000 National Championship	(United States) Jeret Schroeder	1995 U.S. F2000 National Championship
Formula Three
All-Japan Formula Three Championship	(Spain) Pedro de la Rosa	1995 All-Japan Formula Three Championship
All-Japan Formula Three Championship	Teams: (Japan) TOM'S	1995 All-Japan Formula Three Championship
Austria Formula 3 Cup	(Austria) Josef Neuhauser	1995 Austria Formula 3 Cup
Austria Formula 3 Cup	Trophy: (Austria) Georg Holzer	1995 Austria Formula 3 Cup
Brazilian Formula Three Championship	(Brazil) Ricardo Zonta	1995 Brazilian Formula Three Championship
Brazilian Formula Three Championship	Teams: (Brazil) Césario Fórmula	1995 Brazilian Formula Three Championship
British Formula 3 Championship	(United Kingdom) Oliver Gavin	1995 British Formula 3 Championship
British Formula 3 Championship	National: (United Kingdom) Martin Byford	1995 British Formula 3 Championship
Chilean Formula Three Championship	(Chile) Ramón Ibarra	1995 Chilean Formula Three Championship
French Formula Three Championship	(France) Laurent Redon	1995 French Formula Three Championship
French Formula Three Championship	Teams: (France) Promatecme	1995 French Formula Three Championship
German Formula Three Championship	A: (Argentina) Norberto Fontana	1995 German Formula Three Championship
German Formula Three Championship	B: (Denmark) Jakob Sund	1995 German Formula Three Championship
Italian Formula Three Championship	(Italy) Luca Rangoni	1995 Italian Formula Three Championship
Italian Formula Three Championship	Teams: (Italy) EF Project	1995 Italian Formula Three Championship
Mexican Formula Three Championship	(Republic of Ireland) Derek Higgins	1995 Mexican Formula Three Championship
Formula 3 Sudamericana	(Brazil) Ricardo Zonta	1995 Formula 3 Sudamericana
Formula 3 Sudamericana	National: (Argentina) Emiliano Spataro	1995 Formula 3 Sudamericana
Swiss Formula Three Championship	(Switzerland) Jo Zeller	1995 Swiss Formula Three Championship
Formula Renault
French Formula Renault Championship	(France) Cyrille Sauvage	1995 French Formula Renault Championship
Eurocup Formula Renault	(France) Cyrille Sauvage	
Eurocup Formula Renault	Teams: (France) Mygale	
Formula Renault Argentina	(Argentina) Brian Smith	1995 Formula Renault Argentina
Formula Renault Sport UK	(United Kingdom) Guy Smith	1995 Formula Renault Sport UK
Formula Renault Sport UK	Teams: (United Kingdom) Manor Motorsport	1995 Formula Renault Sport UK
Formula Renault BARC	(United Kingdom) David Henderson	1995 Formula Renault BARC
Formula Renault Germany	(Germany) Ralf Druckenmüller	1995 Formula Renault Germany
Formula Renault Netherlands	(Netherlands) Sandor Van Es	1995 Formula Renault Netherlands
Spanish Formula Renault Championship	(Spain) Javier Díaz	1995 Spanish Formula Renault Championship
Formula Ford
Australian Formula Ford Championship	(Australia) Jason Bright	1995 Australian Formula Ford Championship
Benelux Formula Ford 1600 Championship	(Netherlands) Marijn van Kalmthout	1995 Benelux Formula Ford 1600 Championship
British Formula Ford Championship	(Belgium) Bas Leinders	1995 British Formula Ford Championship
Danish Formula Ford Championship	(Denmark) Svend Hansen	
Dutch Formula Ford 1800 Championship	(Netherlands) Sepp Koster	1995 Dutch Formula Ford 1800 Championship
Finnish Formula Ford Championship	(Finland) Janne Koistinen	
Formula Mirage	(Japan) Tsuyoshi Shimizu	
New Zealand Formula Ford Championship	(New Zealand) Shane Drake	
Formula Ford 1600 Nordic Championship	(Finland) Topi Serjala	
Scottish Formula Ford Championship	(United Kingdom) Ricki Steedman	

== Rallying ==
Series	Driver/Co-Driver	Season article
World Rally Championship	(United Kingdom) Colin McRae	1995 World Rally Championship
World Rally Championship	Co-Drivers: (United Kingdom) Derek Ringer	1995 World Rally Championship
World Rally Championship	Manufacturers: (Japan) Subaru	1995 World Rally Championship
FIA Cup for Production Cars	(Portugal) Rui Madeira	1995 World Rally Championship
African Rally Championship	(Namibia) Fritz Flachberger	1995 African Rally Championship
Asia-Pacific Rally Championship	(Sweden) Kenneth Eriksson	1995 Asia-Pacific Rally Championship
Asia-Pacific Rally Championship	Co-Drivers: (Sweden) Staffan Parmander	1995 Asia-Pacific Rally Championship
Australian Rally Championship	(Australia) Neal Bates	1995 Australian Rally Championship
Australian Rally Championship	Co-Drivers: (Australia) Coral Taylor	1995 Australian Rally Championship
British Rally Championship	(United Kingdom) Alister McRae	1995 British Rally Championship
British Rally Championship	Co-Drivers: (United Kingdom) David Senior	1995 British Rally Championship
Canadian Rally Championship	(Canada) Frank Sprongl	1995 Canadian Rally Championship
Canadian Rally Championship	Co-Drivers: (Canada) Mike Koch	1995 Canadian Rally Championship
Czech Rally Championship	(Italy) Enrico Bertone	1995 Czech Rally Championship
Czech Rally Championship	Co-Drivers: (Italy) Massimo Chiapponi	1995 Czech Rally Championship
Deutsche Rallye Meisterschaft	(Germany) Hermann Gassner Sr.	
Estonian Rally Championship	N 2000+: (Estonia) Ivar Raidam	1995 Estonian Rally Championship
Estonian Rally Championship	N 2000+ Co-Drivers: (Estonia) Margus Karjane	1995 Estonian Rally Championship
Estonian Rally Championship	A>2000: (Estonia) Raido Rüütel	1995 Estonian Rally Championship
Estonian Rally Championship	A>2000 Co-Drivers: (Estonia) Robert Lepikson	1995 Estonian Rally Championship
European Rally Championship	(Italy) Enrico Bertone	1995 European Rally Championship
European Rally Championship	Co-Drivers: (Italy) Massimo Chiapponi	1995 European Rally Championship
Finnish Rally Championship	Group A +2000cc: (Finland) Sebastian Lindholm	1995 Finnish Rally Championship
Finnish Rally Championship	Group N +2000cc: (Finland) Mika Korhonen	1995 Finnish Rally Championship
Finnish Rally Championship	Group A -2000cc: (Finland) Harri Rovanperä	1995 Finnish Rally Championship
Finnish Rally Championship	Group N -2000cc: (Finland) Jorma Laakso	1995 Finnish Rally Championship
French Rally Championship	(France) Patrick Bernardini	
Hungarian Rally Championship	(Hungary) János Tóth	
Hungarian Rally Championship	Co-Drivers: (Hungary) Ferenc Gergely	
Indian National Rally Championship	(India) Hari Singh	
Indian National Rally Championship	Co-Drivers: (India) Gurinder Singh Mann	
Italian Rally Championship	(Italy) Gianfranco Cunico	
Italian Rally Championship	Co-Drivers: (Italy) Stefano Evangelisti	
Italian Rally Championship	Manufacturers: (United States) Ford	
Middle East Rally Championship	(Saudi Arabia) Abdullah Bakhashab	
New Zealand Rally Championship	(New Zealand) Reece Jones	1995 New Zealand Rally Championship
New Zealand Rally Championship	Co-Drivers: (New Zealand) Leo Bult	1995 New Zealand Rally Championship
Polish Rally Championship	(Poland) Krzysztof Hołowczyc	
Romanian Rally Championship	(Romania) Constantin Aur	
Scottish Rally Championship	(United Kingdom) David Gillanders	
Scottish Rally Championship	Co-Drivers: (United Kingdom) Martin Forrest	
Slovak Rally Championship	(Slovakia) Jozef Béreš	
Slovak Rally Championship	Co-Drivers: (Slovakia) Michal Kočí	
South African National Rally Championship	(Belgium) Serge Damseaux	
South African National Rally Championship	Co-Drivers: (South Africa) Vito Bonafede	
South African National Rally Championship	Manufacturers: (Japan) Toyota	
Spanish Rally Championship	(Spain) Jesús Puras	
Spanish Rally Championship	Co-Drivers: (Spain) Alex Romaní	

=== Rallycross ===
Series	Driver	Season article
FIA European Rallycross Championship	Div 1: (Norway) Eivind Opland	
FIA European Rallycross Championship	Div 2: (Norway) Martin Schanche	
FIA European Rallycross Championship	1400 Cup: (Netherlands) Ko Kasse	
British Rallycross Championship	(United Kingdom) Dermot Carnegie	

=== Ice racing ===
Series	Driver	Season article
Andros Trophy	Elite: (France) François Chauche	1994–95 Andros Trophy
Andros Trophy	Promotion: (France) James Ruffier	1994–95 Andros Trophy
Andros Trophy	Dame: (France) Michèle Mouton	1994–95 Andros Trophy

== Sports car ==
Series	Driver	Season article
British GT Championship	GT1: (Denmark) Thorkild Thyrring	1995 British GT Championship
British GT Championship	GT2: (United Kingdom) Chris Hodgetts	1995 British GT Championship
IMSA WSC Championship	(Spain) Fermín Vélez	1995 IMSA GT Championship season
IMSA GT Championship	GTS-1: (United States) Irv Hoerr	1995 IMSA GT Championship season
IMSA GT Championship	GTS-2: (Costa Rica) Jorge Trejos	1995 IMSA GT Championship season
BPR Global GT Series	(Germany) Thomas Bscher (Denmark) John Nielsen	1995 BPR Global GT Series season
BPR Global GT Series	Teams: (United Kingdom) David Price Racing	1995 BPR Global GT Series season
Porsche Supercup, Porsche Carrera Cup, GT3 Cup Challenge and Porsche Sprint Challenge
Porsche Supercup	(France) Jean-Pierre Malcher	1995 Porsche Supercup
Porsche Supercup	Teams: (France) JMB Competition	1995 Porsche Supercup
Porsche Carrera Cup France	(France) Christophe Bouchut	1995 Porsche Carrera Cup France
Porsche Carrera Cup Germany	(Germany) Harald Grohs	1995 Porsche Carrera Cup Germany
Porsche Carrera Cup Germany	Teams: (Germany) Oberbayern Motorsport	1995 Porsche Carrera Cup Germany

== Stock car ==
Series	Driver	Season article
NASCAR Winston Cup Series	(United States) Jeff Gordon	1995 NASCAR Winston Cup Series
NASCAR Winston Cup Series	Manufacturers: (United States) Chevrolet	1995 NASCAR Winston Cup Series
NASCAR Busch Grand National Series	(United States) Johnny Benson Jr.	1995 NASCAR Busch Series
NASCAR Busch Grand National Series	Manufacturers: (United States) Ford	1995 NASCAR Busch Series
NASCAR SuperTruck Series	(United States) Mike Skinner	1995 NASCAR SuperTruck Series
NASCAR SuperTruck Series	Manufacturers: (United States) Chevrolet	1995 NASCAR SuperTruck Series
NASCAR Busch North Series	(United States) Kelly Moore	1995 NASCAR Busch North Series
NASCAR Winston West Series	(United States) Doug George	1995 NASCAR Winston West Series
ARCA Bondo/Mar-Hyde Series	(United States) Andy Hillenburg	1995 ARCA Bondo/Mar-Hyde Series
AUSCAR	(Australia) Marshall J. Brewer	1994–95 AUSCAR season
Australian Super Speedway Championship	(Australia) Brad Jones	1994–95 Australian Super Speedway Championship
Turismo Carretera	(Argentina) Juan María Traverso	1995 Turismo Carretera

== Touring car ==
Series	Driver	Season article
ADAC Procar Series	(Germany) Mario Hebler	1995 ADAC Procar Series
ADAC Procar Series	Teams: (Germany) Arkenau Motorsport	1995 ADAC Procar Series
Australian Touring Car Championship	(Australia) John Bowe	1995 Australian Touring Car Championship
Australian Touring Car Championship	Prviateers Cup: (Australia) David Attard	1995 Australian Touring Car Championship
Australian Super Touring Championship	(Australia) Paul Morris	1995 Australian Super Touring Championship
Australian Super Touring Championship	Manufacturers': BMW	1995 Australian Super Touring Championship
Australian Super Touring Championship	Teams: BMW Motorsport	1995 Australian Super Touring Championship
Australian Suzuki Swift Series	(Australia) Adam Clarke	1995 Australian Suzuki Swift Series
Belgian Procar Championship	(Belgium) Thierry Tassin	1995 Belgian Procar Championship
Belgian Procar Championship	Manufacturers: (Germany) BMW	1995 Belgian Procar Championship
British Touring Car Championship	(United Kingdom) John Cleland	1995 British Touring Car Championship
British Touring Car Championship	Teams: (United Kingdom) Vauxhall Sport	1995 British Touring Car Championship
British Touring Car Championship	Manufacturers: (France) Renault	1995 British Touring Car Championship
British Touring Car Championship	Independent: (United Kingdom) Matt Neal	1995 British Touring Car Championship
Deutsche Tourenwagen Meisterschaft	(Germany) Bernd Schneider	1995 Deutsche Tourenwagen Meisterschaft
Deutsche Tourenwagen Meisterschaft	Manufacturers: (Germany) Mercedes-Benz	1995 Deutsche Tourenwagen Meisterschaft
International Touring Car Series	(Germany) Bernd Schneider	1995 Deutsche Tourenwagen Meisterschaft
International Touring Car Series	Manufacturers: (Germany) Mercedes-Benz	1995 Deutsche Tourenwagen Meisterschaft
Europa Cup Renault Clio	(Switzerland) Marcel Kläy	1995 Europa Cup Renault Clio
French Supertouring Championship	(France) Yvan Muller	1995 French Supertouring Championship
French Supertouring Championship	Manufacturers: (Germany) Opel	1995 French Supertouring Championship
French Supertouring Championship	Independents: (Monaco) Stéphane Ortelli	1995 French Supertouring Championship
Italian Superturismo Championship	(Italy) Emanuele Pirro	1995 Italian Superturismo Championship
Italian Superturismo Championship	Teams: (Italy) Audi Sport Italia	1995 Italian Superturismo Championship
Japanese Touring Car Championship	(United Kingdom) Steve Soper	1995 Japanese Touring Car Championship
Japanese Touring Car Championship	Teams: (Germany) Schnitzer Motorsport	1995 Japanese Touring Car Championship
New Zealand Touring Car Championship	(New Zealand) Craig Baird	1995 New Zealand Touring Car Championship
Spanish Supertouring Championship	(Spain) Luis Villamil	1995 Campeonato de España de Superturismos
Spanish Supertouring Championship	Manufacturers: (Italy) Alfa Romeo	1995 Campeonato de España de Superturismos
Stock Car Brasil	(Brazil) Paulo Gomes	1995 Stock Car Brasil season
Super Tourenwagen Cup	(Germany) Joachim Winkelhock	1995 Super Tourenwagen Cup season
TC2000 Championship	(Argentina) Juan María Traverso	1995 TC2000 Championship

== Truck racing ==
Series	Driver	Season article
European Truck Racing Championship	Super-Race-Trucks: (Sweden) Slim Borgudd	1995 European Truck Racing Championship
European Truck Racing Championship	Race-Trucks: (Czech Republic) Martin Koloc	1995 European Truck Racing Championship

== See also ==
- List of motorsport championships
- Auto racing
