= List of 1997 motorsport champions =

1997 motorsport champions
Previous: 1996	Next: 1998

This list of 1997 motorsport champions is a list of national or international auto racing series with a Championship decided by the points or positions earned by a driver from multiple races.

== Dirt oval racing ==
Series	Champion	Refer
World of Outlaws Sprint Car Series	(United States) Sammy Swindell	
World of Outlaws Sprint Car Series	Teams: (United States) Swindell Motorsports	

== Drag racing ==
Series	Champion	Refer
NHRA Winston Drag Racing Series	Top Fuel: (United States) Gary Scelzi	1997 NHRA Winston Drag Racing Series
NHRA Winston Drag Racing Series	Funny Car: (United States) John Force	1997 NHRA Winston Drag Racing Series
NHRA Winston Drag Racing Series	Pro Stock: (United States) Jim Yates	1997 NHRA Winston Drag Racing Series
NHRA Winston Drag Racing Series	Pro Stock Motorcycle: (United States) Matt Hines	1997 NHRA Winston Drag Racing Series

== Karting ==
Series	Driver	Season article
CIK-FIA Karting World Championship	FSA: (Italy) Danilo Rossi	
CIK-FIA Karting World Championship	FC: (Italy) Gianluca Beggio	
CIK-FIA Karting European Championship	FSA: (United Kingdom) Jenson Button	
CIK-FIA Karting European Championship	FC: (Italy) Gianluca Beggio	
CIK-FIA Karting European Championship	FA: (Spain) Antonio García	
CIK-FIA Karting European Championship	ICA: (Italy) Alessandro Balzan	
CIK-FIA Karting European Championship	ICA-J: (Netherlands) Nelson van der Pol	
CIK-FIA Karting European Championship	Cadet: (Netherlands) Michael Koel	

== Motorcycle ==
Series	Rider	Season article
500cc World Championship	(Australia) Mick Doohan	1997 Grand Prix motorcycle racing season
500cc World Championship	Manufacturers: (Japan) Honda	1997 Grand Prix motorcycle racing season
250cc World Championship	(Italy) Max Biaggi	1997 Grand Prix motorcycle racing season
250cc World Championship	Manufacturers: (Japan) Honda	1997 Grand Prix motorcycle racing season
125cc World Championship	(Italy) Valentino Rossi	1997 Grand Prix motorcycle racing season
125cc World Championship	Manufacturers: (Italy) Aprilia	1997 Grand Prix motorcycle racing season
Superbike World Championship	(United States) John Kocinski	1997 Superbike World Championship
Superbike World Championship	Manufacturers: (Japan) Honda	1997 Superbike World Championship
Supersport World Series	(Italy) Paolo Casoli	
Speedway World Championship	(United States) Greg Hancock	1997 Speedway Grand Prix
AMA Superbike Championship	(United States) Doug Chandler	
Australian Superbike Championship	(Australia) Martin Craggill	

== Open wheel racing ==
Series	Driver	Season article
FIA Formula One World Championship	(Canada) Jacques Villeneuve	1997 Formula One World Championship
FIA Formula One World Championship	Constructors: (United Kingdom) Williams-Renault	1997 Formula One World Championship
FIA International Formula 3000	(Brazil) Ricardo Zonta	1997 International Formula 3000 Championship
FIA International Formula 3000	Teams: (United Kingdom) Super Nova Racing	1997 International Formula 3000 Championship
CART PPG World Series	(Italy) Alex Zanardi	1997 CART PPG World Series
CART PPG World Series	Manufacturers: (Germany) Mercedes	1997 CART PPG World Series
CART PPG World Series	Rookies: (Canada) Patrick Carpentier	1997 CART PPG World Series
Indy Racing League	(United States) Tony Stewart	1996–1997 Indy Racing League
Indy Racing League	Manufacturers: (United States) Oldsmobile	1996–1997 Indy Racing League
Indy Racing League	Rookies: (United States) Jim Guthrie	1996–1997 Indy Racing League
Indy Lights Series	(Brazil) Tony Kanaan	1997 Indy Lights season
American Indycar Series	(United States) Ken Petrie	1997 American Indycar Series
Atlantic Championship	(United States) Alex Barron	1997 Atlantic Championship
Australian Drivers' Championship	(Australia) Jason Bright	1997 Australian Drivers' Championship
Barber Dodge Pro Series	(United States) Derek Hill	1997 Barber Dodge Pro Series
Formula Nippon Championship	(Spain) Pedro de la Rosa	1997 Formula Nippon Championship
Formula Nippon Championship	Teams: (Japan) Shionogi Team Nova	1997 Formula Nippon Championship
Historic Formula One Championship	(United Kingdom) Bob Berridge	1997 Historic Formula One Championship
BOSS Formula Series	(United Kingdom) Nigel Greensall	1997 BOSS Formula Series
BOSS Formula Series	Teams: (United Kingdom) European Aviation	1997 BOSS Formula Series
Formula Asia	(Indonesia) Bagoes Hermanto	1997 Formula Asia
JAF Japan Formula 4	(Japan) Akihiro Asai	1997 JAF Japan Formula 4
Formula König	(Germany) Thomas Mühlenz	1997 Formula König season
Formula Toyota	(Argentina) Rubén Derfler	1997 Formula Toyota season
Formula Toyota	West: (Japan) Shinichi Takagi	1997 Formula Toyota season
Russian Formula 1600 Championship	(Russia) Alexander Potekhin	1997 Russian Formula 1600 Championship
Russian Formula 1600 Championship	Teams: (Russia) West Canopus Castrol	1997 Russian Formula 1600 Championship
Russian Formula 1600 Championship	ASPAS Cup: (Russia) Viktor Kozankov	1997 Russian Formula 1600 Championship
Russian Formula 1600 Championship	ASPAS Cup Teams: (Russia) West Canopus Castrol	1997 Russian Formula 1600 Championship
Star Mazda Championship	(United States) Tony Buffomante	1997 Star Mazda Championship
Formula Three
All-Japan Formula Three Championship	(Netherlands) Tom Coronel	1997 All-Japan Formula Three Championship
All-Japan Formula Three Championship	Teams: (Japan) TOM'S	1997 All-Japan Formula Three Championship
Austria Formula 3 Cup	(Czech Republic) Petr Krizan	1997 Austria Formula 3 Cup
Austria Formula 3 Cup	Trophy: (Austria) Georg Holzer	1997 Austria Formula 3 Cup
British Formula 3 Championship	(United Kingdom) Jonny Kane	1997 British Formula Three Championship
British Formula 3 Championship	National: (United Kingdom) Martin O'Connell	1997 British Formula Three Championship
Chilean Formula Three Championship	(Chile) Ramón Ibarra	1997 Chilean Formula Three Championship
French Formula Three Championship	(France) Patrice Gay	1997 French Formula Three Championship
German Formula Three Championship	(Germany) Nick Heidfeld	1997 German Formula Three Championship
German Formula Three Championship	Class B: (Czech Republic) Jaroslav Kostelecký	1997 German Formula Three Championship
German Formula Three Championship	Rookie: (Germany) Timo Scheider	1997 German Formula Three Championship
Italian Formula Three Championship	(Italy) Oliver Martini	1997 Italian Formula Three Championship
Mexican Formula Three Championship	(Republic of Ireland) Derek Higgins	1997 Mexican Formula Three Championship
Formula 3 Sudamericana	(Brazil) Bruno Junqueira	1997 Formula 3 Sudamericana
Formula 3 Sudamericana	National: (Argentina) Diego Chiozzi	1997 Formula 3 Sudamericana
Russian Formula Three Championship	(Russia) Viktor Kozankov	1997 Russian Formula Three Championship
Russian Formula Three Championship	ASPAS Cup: (Italy) Alberto Pedemonte	1997 Russian Formula Three Championship
Swiss Formula Three Championship	(Switzerland) Norbert Zehnder	1997 Swiss Formula Three Championship
Formula Renault
French Formula Renault Championship	(France) Jonathan Cochet	1997 French Formula Renault Championship
Eurocup Formula Renault	(Belgium) Jeffrey van Hooydonk	
Eurocup Formula Renault	Teams: (Italy) Tatuus JD Motorsport	
Formula Renault Argentina	(Argentina) Mauro Fartuszek	1997 Formula Renault Argentina
Formula Renault Sport UK	(United Kingdom) Marc Hynes	1997 Formula Renault Sport UK
Formula Renault Sport UK	Teams: (United Kingdom) Manor Motorsport	1997 Formula Renault Sport UK
Formula Renault BARC	(United Kingdom) Peter Clarke	1997 Formula Renault BARC
Formula Renault Germany	(Austria) Robert Lechner	1997 Formula Renault Germany
Spanish Formula Renault Championship	(Spain) Polo Villaamil	1997 Spanish Formula Renault Championship
Formula Ford
Australian Formula Ford Championship	(Australia) Garth Tander	1997 Australian Formula Ford Championship
Benelux Formula Ford 1600 Championship	(Netherlands) Patrick Koel	
British Formula Ford Championship	(Netherlands) Jacky van der Ende	1997 British Formula Ford Championship
Danish Formula Ford Championship	(Denmark) Tommy Schröter	
Dutch Formula Ford 1800 Championship	(Netherlands) Christijan Albers	
New Zealand Formula Ford Championship	(New Zealand) Scott Dixon	
Formula Ford 1600 Nordic Championship	(Sweden) John Stambeck	
Portuguese Formula Ford Championship	(Portugal) José Pedro Fontes	
Scottish Formula Ford Championship	(United Kingdom) Stewart Roden	
U.S. F2000 National Championship	(Brazil) Zak Morioka	1997 U.S. F2000 National Championship

== Rallying ==
Series	Driver/Co-Driver	Season article
FIA World Rally Championship	(Finland) Tommi Mäkinen	1997 World Rally Championship
FIA World Rally Championship	Co-Drivers: (Finland) Seppo Harjanne	1997 World Rally Championship
FIA World Rally Championship	Manufacturers: (Japan) Subaru	1997 World Rally Championship
FIA World Rally Championship	Group N Cup: (Uruguay) Gustavo Trelles	1997 World Rally Championship
African Rally Championship	(Zambia) Satwant Singh	1997 African Rally Championship
Asia-Pacific Rally Championship	(Sweden) Kenneth Eriksson	1997 Asia-Pacific Rally Championship
Asia-Pacific Rally Championship	Co-Drivers: (Sweden) Staffan Parmander	1997 Asia-Pacific Rally Championship
Asia-Pacific Rally Championship	Manufacturers: (Japan) Subaru	1997 Asia-Pacific Rally Championship
Asia-Pacific Rally Championship	Group N: (Malaysia) Karamjit Singh	1997 Asia-Pacific Rally Championship
Asia-Pacific Rally Championship	2-Litre: (Japan) Nobuhiro Tajima	1997 Asia-Pacific Rally Championship
Australian Rally Championship	(New Zealand) Possum Bourne	1997 Australian Rally Championship
Australian Rally Championship	Co-Drivers: (Australia) Craig Vincent	1997 Australian Rally Championship
British Rally Championship	(United Kingdom) Mark Higgins	1997 British Rally Championship
British Rally Championship	Manufacturers: (Germany) Volkswagen	1997 British Rally Championship
Canadian Rally Championship	(Canada) Frank Sprongl	1997 Canadian Rally Championship
Canadian Rally Championship	Co-Drivers: (Canada) Dan Sprongl	1997 Canadian Rally Championship
Czech Rally Championship	(Czech Republic) Milan Dolák	1997 Czech Rally Championship
Czech Rally Championship	Co-Drivers: (Czech Republic) Jaroslav Palivec	1997 Czech Rally Championship
Deutsche Rallye Meisterschaft	(Germany) Matthias Kahle	
Estonian Rally Championship	N 2000+: (Estonia) Ivar Raidam	1997 Estonian Rally Championship
Estonian Rally Championship	N 2000+ Co-Drivers: (Estonia) Margus Karjane	1997 Estonian Rally Championship
Estonian Rally Championship	A>2000: (Estonia) Markko Märtin	1997 Estonian Rally Championship
Estonian Rally Championship	A>2000 Co-Drivers: (Estonia) Toomas Kitsing	1997 Estonian Rally Championship
European Rally Championship	(Poland) Krzysztof Hołowczyc	1997 European Rally Championship
European Rally Championship	Co-Drivers: (Poland) Maciej Wisławski	1997 European Rally Championship
Finnish Rally Championship	Group A +2000cc: (Finland) Marcus Grönholm	1997 Finnish Rally Championship
Finnish Rally Championship	Group N +2000cc: (Finland) Jouko Puhakka	1997 Finnish Rally Championship
Finnish Rally Championship	Group A -2000cc: (Finland) Toni Gardemeister	1997 Finnish Rally Championship
Finnish Rally Championship	Group N -2000cc: (Finland) Jani Pirttinen	1997 Finnish Rally Championship
French Rally Championship	(France) Gilles Panizzi	
Hungarian Rally Championship	(Hungary) János Tóth	
Hungarian Rally Championship	Co-Drivers: (Hungary) Ferenc Gergely	
Indian National Rally Championship	(India) Hari Singh	
Indian National Rally Championship	Co-Drivers: (India) Gurinder Singh Mann	
Italian Rally Championship	(Italy) Andrea Dallavilla	
Italian Rally Championship	Co-Drivers: (Italy) Danilo Fappani	
Italian Rally Championship	Manufacturers: (Japan) Subaru	
Middle East Rally Championship	(United Arab Emirates) Mohammed Ben Sulayem	
New Zealand Rally Championship	(New Zealand) Reece Jones	1997 New Zealand Rally Championship
New Zealand Rally Championship	Co-Drivers: (New Zealand) Leo Bult	1997 New Zealand Rally Championship
Polish Rally Championship	(Poland) Janusz Kulig	
Romanian Rally Championship	(Romania) Constantin Aur	
Scottish Rally Championship	(United Kingdom) Brian Lyall	1997 Scottish Rally Championship
Scottish Rally Championship	Co-Drivers: (United Kingdom) John Bennie	1997 Scottish Rally Championship
Slovak Rally Championship	(Slovakia) Igor Drotár	
Slovak Rally Championship	Co-Drivers: (Slovakia) Vladimír Bánoci	
South African National Rally Championship	(South Africa) Jan Habig	
South African National Rally Championship	Co-Drivers: (South Africa) Douglas Judd	
South African National Rally Championship	Manufacturers: (Germany) Volkswagen	
Spanish Rally Championship	(Spain) Jesús Puras	
Spanish Rally Championship	Co-Drivers: (Spain) Carlos del Barrio	

=== Rallycross ===
Series	Driver	Season article
FIA European Rallycross Championship	Div 1: (Norway) Ludvig Hunsbedt	
FIA European Rallycross Championship	Div 2: (Norway) Eivind Opland	
FIA European Rallycross Championship	1400 Cup: (Czech Republic) Jaroslav Kalný	
British Rallycross Championship	(United Kingdom) Will Gollop	

=== Ice racing ===
Series	Driver	Season article
Andros Trophy	Elite: (France) Yvan Muller	1996–97 Andros Trophy
Andros Trophy	Promotion: (France) Frédéric Morel	1996–97 Andros Trophy
Andros Trophy	Dame: (France) Florence Duez	1996–97 Andros Trophy

== Sports car ==
Series	Driver	Season article
FIA GT Championship	GT1: (Germany) Bernd Schneider	1997 FIA GT Championship
FIA GT Championship	GT1 Teams: (Germany) AMG-Mercedes	1997 FIA GT Championship
FIA GT Championship	GT2: (United Kingdom) Justin Bell	1997 FIA GT Championship
FIA GT Championship	GT2 Teams: (France) Viper Team Oreca	1997 FIA GT Championship
British GT Championship	GT1: (United Kingdom) John Morrison; GT1: (United Kingdom) John Greasley	1997 British GT Championship
British GT Championship	GT2: (United Kingdom) Steve O'Rourke; GT2: (United Kingdom) Tim Sugden	1997 British GT Championship
British GT Championship	GT3: (United Kingdom) Simon Tate	1997 British GT Championship
IMSA GT Championship	GTS-1: (United States) Andy Pilgrim	1997 IMSA GT Championship
IMSA GT Championship	GTS-2: (United States) Larry Schumacher	1997 IMSA GT Championship
IMSA WSC Championship	(United States) Butch Leitzinger	1997 IMSA GT Championship
Trans-Am Series	(United States) Tommy Kendall	1997 Trans-Am Series
Porsche Supercup, Porsche Carrera Cup, GT3 Cup Challenge and Porsche Sprint Challenge
Porsche Supercup	(Netherlands) Patrick Huisman	1997 Porsche Supercup
Porsche Supercup	Teams: (Germany) Olaf Manthey Racing	1997 Porsche Supercup
Porsche Carrera Cup France	(France) Dominique Dupuy	1997 Porsche Carrera Cup France
Porsche Carrera Cup Germany	(Germany) Wolfgang Land	1997 Porsche Carrera Cup Germany
Porsche Carrera Cup Germany	Teams: (Germany) Porsche Zentrum Freiburg/Eichin Racing	1997 Porsche Carrera Cup Germany

== Stock car ==
Series	Driver	Season article
NASCAR Winston Cup Series	(United States) Jeff Gordon	1997 NASCAR Winston Cup Series
NASCAR Winston Cup Series	Manufacturers: (United States) Ford	1997 NASCAR Winston Cup Series
NASCAR Busch Grand National Series	(United States) Randy LaJoie	1997 NASCAR Busch Series
NASCAR Busch Grand National Series	Manufacturers: (United States) Chevrolet	1997 NASCAR Busch Series
NASCAR Craftsman Truck Series	(United States) Jack Sprague	1997 NASCAR Craftsman Truck Series
NASCAR Craftsman Truck Series	Manufacturers: (United States) Chevrolet	1997 NASCAR Craftsman Truck Series
NASCAR Busch North Series	(United States) Mike Stefanik	1997 NASCAR Busch North Series
NASCAR Winston West Series	(United States) Butch Gilliland	1997 NASCAR Winston West Series
ARCA Bondo/Mar-Hyde Series	(United States) Tim Steele	1997 ARCA Bondo/Mar-Hyde Series
AUSCAR	(Australia) Matthew White	1996–97 AUSCAR season
Australian Super Speedway Championship	(Australia) Kim Jane	1996–97 Australian Super Speedway Championship
Turismo Carretera	(Argentina) Juan María Traverso	1997 Turismo Carretera

== Touring car ==
Series	Driver	Season article
ADAC Procar Series	(Germany) Jürgen Hohenester	1997 ADAC Procar Series
ADAC Procar Series	Teams: (Germany) Hohenester Motorsport	1997 ADAC Procar Series
AMSCAR	(Australia) Mal Rose	1997 ARDC AMSCAR series
Australian Touring Car Championship	(Australia) Glenn Seton	1997 Australian Touring Car Championship
Australian Touring Car Championship	Privateers Cup: (New Zealand) John Faulkner	1997 Australian Touring Car Championship
Australian Super Touring Championship	(Australia) Paul Morris	1997 Australian Super Touring Championship
Australian Super Touring Championship	Teams: (Australia) BMW Motorsport	1997 Australian Super Touring Championship
Australian Super Touring Championship	Manufacturers: (Germany) BMW	1997 Australian Super Touring Championship
British Touring Car Championship	(Switzerland) Alain Menu	1997 British Touring Car Championship
British Touring Car Championship	Teams: (United Kingdom) Williams Renault Dealer Team	1997 British Touring Car Championship
British Touring Car Championship	Manufacturers: (France) Renault	1997 British Touring Car Championship
British Touring Car Championship	Privateers: (United Kingdom) Robb Gravett	1997 British Touring Car Championship
Finnish Touring Car Championship	(Finland) Heikki Salmenautio	
French Supertouring Championship	(France) Éric Cayrolle	
Italian Superturismo Championship	(Italy) Emanuele Naspetti	1997 Italian Superturismo Championship
Italian Superturismo Championship	Manufacturers: (Germany) BMW	1997 Italian Superturismo Championship
Italian Superturismo Championship	Privateers: (Italy) Massimo Pigoli	1997 Italian Superturismo Championship
Japanese Touring Car Championship	(Japan) Osamu Nakako	1997 Japanese Touring Car Championship
Japanese Touring Car Championship	Teams: (Japan) Mugen Motorsports	1997 Japanese Touring Car Championship
New Zealand Touring Car Championship	(New Zealand) Craig Baird	1997 New Zealand Touring Car Championship
New Zealand V8 Championship	(New Zealand) Greg Taylor	1996–97 New Zealand V8 season
North American Touring Car Championship	(United States) David Donohue	1997 North American Touring Car Championship season
North American Touring Car Championship	Manufacturers: (Japan) Honda	1997 North American Touring Car Championship season
Renault Sport Spider Elf Trophy	(Norway) Tommy Rustad	1997 Renault Sport Spider Elf Trophy
Spanish Supertouring Championship	(Italy) Fabrizio Giovanardi	1997 Campeonato de España de Superturismos
Spanish Supertouring Championship	Manufacturers: (Italy) Alfa Romeo	1997 Campeonato de España de Superturismos
Stock Car Brasil	(Brazil) Ingo Hoffmann	1997 Stock Car Brasil season
Super Tourenwagen Cup	(France) Laurent Aïello	1997 Super Tourenwagen Cup
Super Tourenwagen Cup	Teams: (France) ROC Auto/A.Z.K.	1997 Super Tourenwagen Cup
Super Tourenwagen Cup	Manufacturers: (Germany) BMW	1997 Super Tourenwagen Cup
Swedish Touring Car Championship	(Sweden) Jan Nilsson	1997 Swedish Touring Car Championship
TC2000 Championship	(Argentina) Henry Martin	1997 TC2000 Championship

== Truck racing ==
Series	Driver	Season article
European Truck Racing Championship	Super-Race-Trucks: (Finland) Harri Luostarinen	1997 European Truck Racing Championship
European Truck Racing Championship	Race-Trucks: (Germany) Heinz-Werner Lenz	1997 European Truck Racing Championship
Fórmula Truck	(Brazil) Oswaldo Drugovich Jr.	1997 Fórmula Truck
Fórmula Truck	Teams: (Brazil) Drugovich Auto Peças	1997 Fórmula Truck

== See also ==
- List of motorsport championships
- Auto racing
