= List of 1994 motorsport champions =

1994 motorsport champions
Previous: 1993	Next: 1995

This list of 1994 motorsport champions is a list of national or international auto racing series with a Championship decided by the points or positions earned by a driver from multiple races.

== Dirt oval racing ==
Series	Champion	Refer
World of Outlaws Sprint Car Series	(United States) Steve Kinser	
World of Outlaws Sprint Car Series	Teams: (United States) Karl Kinser Racing	

== Drag racing ==
Series	Champion	Refer
NHRA Winston Drag Racing Series	Top Fuel: (United States) Scott Kalitta	1994 NHRA Winston Drag Racing Series
NHRA Winston Drag Racing Series	Funny Car: (United States) John Force	1994 NHRA Winston Drag Racing Series
NHRA Winston Drag Racing Series	Pro Stock: (United States) Darrell Alderman	1994 NHRA Winston Drag Racing Series
NHRA Winston Drag Racing Series	Pro Stock Motorcycle: (United States) Dave Schultz	1994 NHRA Winston Drag Racing Series

== Karting ==
Series	Driver	Season article
CIK-FIA Karting World Championship	FSA: (Italy) Alessandro Manetti	
CIK-FIA Karting World Championship	Formula A: (Italy) Marco Barindelli	
CIK-FIA Karting World Championship	FC: (Italy) Jarno Trulli	
CIK-FIA Five Continents Cup Junior A	(Italy) Giorgio Pantano	
CIK-FIA Karting European Championship	FSA: (Italy) Jarno Trulli	
CIK-FIA Karting European Championship	ICC: (Italy) Vincenzo Azzolina	
CIK-FIA Karting European Championship	FA: (Italy) Davide Forè	
CIK-FIA Karting European Championship	ICA: (Belgium) Narcis Callens	
CIK-FIA Karting European Championship	ICA-J: (Belgium) Philip Cloostermans	
World Superkart Championship	(Netherlands) Perry Grondstra	

== Motorcycle ==
Series	Rider	Season article
500cc World Championship	(Australia) Michael Doohan	1994 Grand Prix motorcycle racing season
250cc World Championship	(Italy) Max Biaggi	1994 Grand Prix motorcycle racing season
125cc World Championship	(Japan) Kazuto Sakata	1994 Grand Prix motorcycle racing season
Superbike World Championship	(United Kingdom) Carl Fogarty	1994 Superbike World Championship season
Speedway World Championship	(Sweden) Tony Rickardsson	1994 Individual Speedway World Championship
AMA Superbike Championship	(Australia) Troy Corser	
Australian Superbike Championship	(Australia) Anthony Gobert	

== Open wheel racing ==
Series	Driver	Season article
FIA Formula One World Championship	(Germany) Michael Schumacher	1994 Formula One World Championship
FIA Formula One World Championship	Constructors: (United Kingdom) Williams-Renault	1994 Formula One World Championship
PPG Indy Car World Series	(United States) Al Unser Jr.	1994 PPG Indy Car World Series
PPG Indy Car World Series	Manufacturers: (United Kingdom) Ilmor	1994 PPG Indy Car World Series
PPG Indy Car World Series	Rookies: (Canada) Jacques Villeneuve	1994 PPG Indy Car World Series
Indy Lights Series	(United Kingdom) Steve Robertson	1994 Indy Lights season
International Formula 3000	(France) Jean-Christophe Boullion	1994 International Formula 3000 season
All-Japan Formula 3000 Championship	(Italy) Marco Apicella	1994 Japanese Formula 3000 Championship
British Formula Two Championship	(Argentina) José Luis Di Palma	1994 British Formula Two Championship
American Indycar Series	(United States) Bill Tempero	1994 American Indycar Series
Toyota Atlantic Championship	(Canada) David Empringham	1994 Atlantic Championship
Australian Drivers' Championship	(Australia) Paul Stokell	1994 Australian Drivers' Championship
Barber Saab Pro Series	(Colombia) Diego Guzman	1994 Barber Saab Pro Series
Formula König	(Germany) Bernd Friedrich	1994 Formula König season
Formula König	Teams: (Germany) Lohmann Motorsport	1994 Formula König season
Formula Toyota	(Japan) Shigeaki Hattori	1994 Formula Toyota season
Formula Toyota	West: (Japan) Jiro Nakatani	1994 Formula Toyota season
Star Mazda Championship	(United States) Brad Loehner	1994 Star Mazda Championship
SCCA American Continental Championship	(United States) Mike Borkowski	1994 SCCA American Continental Championship
USAC FF2000 National Championship	(United States) Clay Collier	1994 USAC FF2000 National Championshipp
Formula Three
All-Japan Formula Three Championship	(Germany) Michael Krumm	1994 All-Japan Formula Three Championship
All-Japan Formula Three Championship	Teams: (Japan) TOM'S	1994 All-Japan Formula Three Championship
Austria Formula 3 Cup	(Austria) Alexander Wurz	1994 Austria Formula 3 Cup
Austria Formula 3 Cup	Trophy: (Austria) Ewald Kapferer	1994 Austria Formula 3 Cup
Brazilian Formula Three Championship	(Brazil) Cristiano da Matta	1994 Brazilian Formula Three Championship
Brazilian Formula Three Championship	Teams: (Brazil) Césario Fórmula	1994 Brazilian Formula Three Championship
British Formula 3 Championship	(Denmark) Jan Magnussen	1994 British Formula Three Championship
British Formula 3 Championship	National: (United Kingdom) Duncan Vercoe	1994 British Formula Three Championship
Chilean Formula Three Championship	(Chile) Ramón Ibarra	1994 Chilean Formula Three Championship
French Formula Three Championship	(France) Jean-Philippe Belloc	1994 French Formula Three Championship
French Formula Three Championship	Teams: (France) Winfield Racing School	1994 French Formula Three Championship
German Formula Three Championship	(Germany) Jörg Müller	1994 German Formula Three Championship
German Formula Three Championship	B: (Germany) Arnd Meier	1994 German Formula Three Championship
Italian Formula Three Championship	(Italy) Giancarlo Fisichella	1994 Italian Formula Three Championship
Italian Formula Three Championship	Teams: (Italy) RC Motorsport	1994 Italian Formula Three Championship
Mexican Formula Three Championship	(Mexico) Carlos Guerrero	1994 Mexican Formula Three Championship
Formula Three Sudamericana	(Argentina) Gabriel Furlán	1994 Formula 3 Sudamericana
Swiss Formula Three Championship	(Switzerland) Rüdi Schurter	1994 Swiss Formula Three Championship
Formula Renault
French Formula Renault Championship	(France) Stéphane Sarrazin	1994 French Formula Renault Championship
Eurocup Formula Renault	(United Kingdom) James Matthews	
Eurocup Formula Renault	Teams: (United Kingdom) Manor Motorsport	
Formula Renault Argentina	(Argentina) Guillermo Di Giacinti	1994 Formula Renault Argentina
Formula Renault Germany	(Germany) Marcel Tiemann	1994 Formula Renault Germany
Formula Renault Sport UK	(United Kingdom) James Matthews	1994 Formula Renault Sport UK
Formula Renault Sport UK	Teams: (United Kingdom) Manor Motorsport	1994 Formula Renault Sport UK
Spanish Formula Renault Championship	(Spain) Javier Díaz	1994 Spanish Formula Renault Championship
Formula Ford
Australian Formula Ford Championship	(New Zealand) Steven Richards	1994 Australian Formula Ford Championship
Benelux Formula Ford 1800 Championship	(Belgium) Bas Leinders	
Benelux Formula Ford 1600 Championship	(Netherlands) Ron Swart	
British Formula Ford Championship	(Denmark) Jason Watt	1994 British Formula Ford Championship
Danish Formula Ford Championship	(Denmark) Steffen Nielsen	
Dutch Formula Ford 1600 Championship	(Netherlands) Ron Swart	
Finnish Formula Ford Championship	(Finland) Joonas Salmimäki	
Formula Mirage	(Japan) Takeshi Asami	1994 Formula Mirage season
German Formula Ford Championship	(Germany) Nick Heidfeld	
New Zealand Formula Ford Championship	(New Zealand) Ashley Stichbury	
Formula Ford 1600 Nordic Championship	(Finland) Joonas Salmimäki	

== Rallying ==
Series	Driver/Co-Driver	Season article
World Rally Championship	(France) Didier Auriol	1994 World Rally Championship
World Rally Championship	Co-Drivers: (Finland) Bernard Occelli	1994 World Rally Championship
World Rally Championship	Manufacturers: (Japan) Toyota	1994 World Rally Championship
FIA Cup for Production Cars	(Spain) Jesús Puras	1994 World Rally Championship
African Rally Championship	(Zimbabwe) Abe Smit	1994 African Rally Championship
Asia-Pacific Rally Championship	(New Zealand) Possum Bourne	1994 Asia-Pacific Rally Championship
Asia-Pacific Rally Championship	Co-Drivers: (New Zealand) Tony Sircombe	1994 Asia-Pacific Rally Championship
Australian Rally Championship	(Australia) Neal Bates	1994 Australian Rally Championship
Australian Rally Championship	Co-Drivers: (Australia) Coral Taylor	1994 Australian Rally Championship
British Rally Championship	(United Kingdom) Malcolm Wilson	1994 British Rally Championship
British Rally Championship	Co-Drivers: (United Kingdom) Bryan Thomas	1994 British Rally Championship
Canadian Rally Championship	(Canada) Frank Sprongl	1994 Canadian Rally Championship
Canadian Rally Championship	Co-Drivers: (Canada) Dan Sprongl	1994 Canadian Rally Championship
Czech Rally Championship	(Italy) Piergiorgio Deila	1994 Czech Rally Championship
Czech Rally Championship	Co-Drivers: (Italy) Pierangelo Scalvini	1994 Czech Rally Championship
Deutsche Rallye Meisterschaft	(Germany) Dieter Depping	
Estonian Rally Championship	(Estonia) Ivar Raidam	1994 Estonian Rally Championship
Estonian Rally Championship	Co-Drivers: (Estonia) Margus Karjane	1994 Estonian Rally Championship
European Rally Championship	(Belgium) Patrick Snijers	1994 European Rally Championship
European Rally Championship	Co-Drivers: (Belgium) Dany Colebunders	1994 European Rally Championship
Finnish Rally Championship	Group A +2000cc: (Finland) Marcus Grönholm	1994 Finnish Rally Championship
Finnish Rally Championship	Group N +2000cc: (Finland) Jari Latvala	1994 Finnish Rally Championship
Finnish Rally Championship	Group A -2000cc: (Finland) Heikki Westerlund	1994 Finnish Rally Championship
Finnish Rally Championship	Group N -2000cc: (Finland) Jorma Laakso	1994 Finnish Rally Championship
French Rally Championship	(France) Patrick Bernardini	
Hungarian Rally Championship	(Hungary) László Ranga	
Hungarian Rally Championship	Co-Drivers: (Hungary) Ernő Büki	
Indian National Rally Championship	(India) Hari Singh	
Indian National Rally Championship	Co-Drivers: (India) Gurinder Singh Mann	
Italian Rally Championship	(Italy) Gianfranco Cunico	
Italian Rally Championship	Co-Drivers: (Italy) Stefano Evangelisti	
Italian Rally Championship	Manufacturers: (United States) Ford	
Middle East Rally Championship	(United Arab Emirates) Mohammed Ben Sulayem	
New Zealand Rally Championship	(New Zealand) Joe McAndrew	1994 New Zealand Rally Championship
New Zealand Rally Championship	Co-Drivers: (New Zealand) Robert Haldane	1994 New Zealand Rally Championship
Polish Rally Championship	(Poland) Paweł Przybylski	
Romanian Rally Championship	(Romania) Heinz Goellner	
Scottish Rally Championship	(United Kingdom) Michael Horne	
Scottish Rally Championship	Co-Drivers: (United Kingdom) Monty Pearson	
Slovak Rally Championship	(Slovakia) Jozef Béreš	
Slovak Rally Championship	Co-Drivers: (Slovakia) Michal Kočí	
South African National Rally Championship	(Belgium) Serge Damseaux	
South African National Rally Championship	Co-Drivers: (South Africa) Vito Bonafede	
South African National Rally Championship	Manufacturers: (Germany) Volkswagen	
Spanish Rally Championship	(Spain) Oriol Gómez	
Spanish Rally Championship	Co-Drivers: (Spain) Marc Martí	

=== Rallycross ===
Series	Driver	Season article
FIA European Rallycross Championship	Div 1: (United Kingdom) Richard Hutton	1994 European Rallycross Championship
FIA European Rallycross Championship	Div 2: (Sweden) Kenneth Hansen	1994 European Rallycross Championship
FIA European Rallycross Championship	1400 Cup: (Sweden) Susann Bergvall	1994 European Rallycross Championship
British Rallycross Championship	(United Kingdom) Dermot Carnegie	

=== Ice racing ===
Series	Driver	Season article
Andros Trophy	Elite: (France) François Chauche	1993–94 Andros Trophy
Andros Trophy	Promotion: (France) Eric Arpin	1993–94 Andros Trophy
Andros Trophy	Dame: (France) Patricia Bertapelle	1993–94 Andros Trophy

== Sports car ==
Series	Driver	Season article
British GT Championship	Class A: (United Kingdom) Ross Hyett	1994 British GT Championship
British GT Championship	Class B: (Denmark) Thorkild Thyrring	1994 British GT Championship
British GT Championship	Class C: (United Kingdom) Nigel Barrett	1994 British GT Championship
IMSA WSC Championship	(South Africa) Wayne Taylor	1994 IMSA GT Championship
IMSA GT Championship	GTS: (New Zealand) Steve Millen	1994 IMSA GT Championship
IMSA GT Championship	GTO: (United States) Joe Pezza	1994 IMSA GT Championship
IMSA GT Championship	GTU: (United States) Jim Pace	1994 IMSA GT Championship
Porsche Supercup, Porsche Carrera Cup, GT3 Cup Challenge and Porsche Sprint Challenge
Porsche Supercup	(Germany) Uwe Alzen	1994 Porsche Supercup
Porsche Supercup	Teams: (Germany) Porsche Zentrum Koblenz	1994 Porsche Supercup
Porsche Carrera Cup France	(France) Christophe Bouchut	1994 Porsche Carrera Cup France
Porsche Carrera Cup Germany	(Germany) Bernd Mayländer	1994 Porsche Carrera Cup Germany
Porsche Carrera Cup Germany	Teams: (Germany) Porsche Zentrum Koblenz	1994 Porsche Carrera Cup Germany

== Stock car ==
Series	Driver	Season article
NASCAR Winston Cup Series	(United States) Dale Earnhardt	1994 NASCAR Winston Cup Series
NASCAR Winston Cup Series	Manufacturers: (United States) Ford	1994 NASCAR Winston Cup Series
NASCAR Busch Grand National Series	(United States) David Green	1994 NASCAR Busch Series
NASCAR Busch Grand National Series	Manufacturers: (United States) Chevrolet	1994 NASCAR Busch Series
NASCAR Busch North Series	(United States) Dale Shaw	1994 NASCAR Busch North Series
NASCAR Winston West Series	(United States) Mike Chase	1994 NASCAR Winston West Series
ARCA Bondo/Mar-Hyde Series	(United States) Bobby Bowsher	1994 ARCA Bondo/Mar-Hyde Series
AUSCAR	(Australia) Brad Jones	1993–94 AUSCAR season
Australian Super Speedway Championship	(Australia) Barry Graham	1993–94 Australian Super Speedway Championship
Turismo Carretera	(Argentina) Eduardo Ramos	1994 Turismo Carretera

== Touring car ==
Series	Driver	Season article
Asia-Pacific Touring Car Championship	(Germany) Joachim Winkelhock	1994 Asia-Pacific Touring Car Championship
Australian Touring Car Championship	(Australia) Mark Skaife	1994 Australian Touring Car Championship
Australian Touring Car Championship	Privateers Cup: (Australia) Bob Jones	1994 Australian Touring Car Championship
Australian Super Touring Championship	(Australia) Tony Longhurst	1994 Australian Manufacturers' Championship
Australian Super Touring Championship	Manufacturers': BMW	1994 Australian Manufacturers' Championship
British Touring Car Championship	(Italy) Gabriele Tarquini	1994 British Touring Car Championship
British Touring Car Championship	Manufacturers: (Italy) Alfa Romeo	1994 British Touring Car Championship
British Touring Car Championship	Independent: (United Kingdom) James Kaye	1994 British Touring Car Championship
Campeonato Brasileiro de Marcas e Pilotos	(Brazil) Egon Herzfield (Brazil) Vicente Daudt	1994 Campeonato Brasileiro de Marcas e Pilotos
Deutsche Tourenwagen Meisterschaft	(Germany) Klaus Ludwig	1994 Deutsche Tourenwagen Meisterschaft
Europa Cup Renault Clio	(France) Bernard Castagne	1994 Europa Cup Renault Clio
French Supertouring Championship	(France) Laurent Aïello	1994 French Supertouring Championship
French Supertouring Championship	Manufacturers: (France) Peugeot	1994 French Supertouring Championship
French Supertouring Championship	Privateers: (France) Michel Bandura	1994 French Supertouring Championship
Italian Superturismo Championship	(Italy) Emanuele Pirro	1994 Italian Superturismo Championship
Italian Superturismo Championship	Teams: (Italy) Audi Sport Italia	1994 Italian Superturismo Championship
Japanese Touring Car Championship	(Japan) Masanori Sekiya	1994 Japanese Touring Car Championship
Japanese Touring Car Championship	Teams: (Germany) Schnitzer Motorsport	1994 Japanese Touring Car Championship
New Zealand Touring Car Championship	(New Zealand) Craig Baird	1994 New Zealand Touring Car Championship
Spanish Supertouring Championship	(Spain) Adrián Campos	1994 Campeonato de España de Superturismos
Spanish Supertouring Championship	Manufacturers: (Germany) BMW	1994 Campeonato de España de Superturismos
Stock Car Brasil	(Brazil) Ingo Hoffmann	1994 Stock Car Brasil season
TC2000 Championship	(Argentina) Guillermo Maldonado	1994 TC2000 Championship

== Truck racing ==
Series	Driver	Season article
European Truck Racing Championship	Super-Race-Trucks: (United Kingdom) Steve Parrish	1994 European Truck Racing Championship
European Truck Racing Championship	Race-Trucks: (Sweden) Boije Ovebrink	1994 European Truck Racing Championship

== See also ==
- List of motorsport championships
- Auto racing
