= 1994 in motorsport =

The following is an overview of the events of 1994 in motorsport including the major racing events, motorsport venues that were opened and closed during a year, championships and non-championship events that were established and disestablished in a year, and births and deaths of racing drivers and other motorsport people.

== Annual events ==
The calendar includes only annual major non-championship events or annual events that had significance separate from the championship. For the dates of the championship events see related season articles.

Date	Event	Ref
28 December-16 January	16th Dakar Rally	
5–6 February	32nd 24 Hours of Daytona	
20 February	36th Daytona 500	
19 March	42nd 12 Hours of Sebring	
1 May	25th Winston Select 500	
15 May	52nd Monaco Grand Prix	
29 May	78th Indianapolis 500	
29 May	35th Coca-Cola 600	
4–5 June	22nd 24 Hours of Nurburgring	
30 May-10 June	77th Isle of Man TT	
18–19 June	62nd 24 Hours of Le Mans	
23–24 July	46th 24 Hours of Spa	
31 July	17th Suzuka 8 Hours	
7 August	4th Masters of Formula 3	
4 September	45th Mountain Dew Southern 500	
2 October	35th Tooheys 1000	
20 November	41st Macau Grand Prix	
3–4 December	7th Race of Champions	

== Deaths ==
Date	Month	Name	Age	Nationality	Occupation	Note	Ref
11	February	Neil Bonnett	47	American	Racing driver	NASCAR Cup Series winner of 3 crown jewel races (1981 Southern 500, 1982 and 1983 World 600)	
14	February	Rodney Orr	31	American	Racing Driver	NASCAR Goody's Dash Series champion (1993)	
30	April	Roland Ratzenberger	34	Austria	Racing driver	Class winner of the 24 Hours of Le Mans (1993)	
1	May	Ayrton Senna	34	Brazilian	Racing driver	Formula One World Champion (1988, 1990, 1991); Winner of the Monaco Grand Prix (1987, 1989, 1990, 1991, 1992, 1993)	
13	May	Duncan Hamilton	74	British	Racing driver	Overall winner of the 24 Hours of Le Mans (1953).	
27	June	Sam Hanks	79	American	Racing driver	Winner of the Indianapolis 500 (1957); IndyCar Series Champion (1953)	
17	August	Luigi Chinetti	93	Italian-American	Racing driver	Overall winner of the 24 Hours of Le Mans (1932, 1934 and 1949)	

== See also ==
- List of 1994 motorsport champions
