= Bruno Correia =

Portuguese racing driver (born 1977)

- Nationality: Portuguese
- Born: Bruno Ricardo Sobreiro Correia; 16 November 1977 (age 48)
- Retired: 2006

Previous series
- 2005 1997 1995–1996 1994: Brazilian Supertouring Championship; Barber Dodge Pro Series; Spanish Formula Renault Championship; Formula Ford 1600 Portugal

Championship titles
- 1996 1994: Spanish Formula Renault Championship; Formula Ford 1600 Portugal

Bruno Ricardo Sobreiro Correia (born 16 November 1977) is a Portuguese former racing driver. He is currently the safety car driver for FIA Formula E and shares duties with Karl Reindler as the Medical Car driver for Formula One.

After a career in karting, Correia started his autoracing career in 1994 in his domestic Formula Ford championship. Correia competed in the Formula Ford 1600 class. The Portuguese driver won the title in the last season the class was contested. The following season, Correia moved into the Spanish Formula Renault Championship. The Portuguese driver won the Junior championship in 1995 and the overall championship in 1996. In 1997, Correia moved to the United States of America to race in the Skip Barber Formula Dodge. He also competed in Barber Dodge Pro Series races. After not being able to secure a drive for 1998, Correia built a successful hotel at the beach in Cumbuco, Brazil.

Correia returned to the racing circuits in 2005 for a single season. He achieved the runner-up position in the Brazilian Supertouring Championship. After working as a driver trainer for several years, Correia was appointed as the official World Touring Car Championship safety car driver. After the 2009 FIA WTCC Race of France in which racing driver Franz Engstler hit the inexperienced safety car drivers (employed by the French ASN, rather than the FIA), the FIA decided to employ a permanent safety car driver. After his first test race weekend at Brno Circuit, Correia was appointed as the safety car driver for the WTCC and its support classes.

For 2012, Correia also joined the European Touring Car Cup as the official safety car driver. For 2014, the Portuguese driver was appointed as the official safety car driver for the inaugural FIA Formula E championship. He drove the electric powered BMW i8 at every event. On 7 October 2021, it was announced that Correia would serve as the Formula One medical car driver at the 2021 Turkish Grand Prix, standing in for Alan van der Merwe who failed a COVID-19 test prior to that event.

== Gallery ==
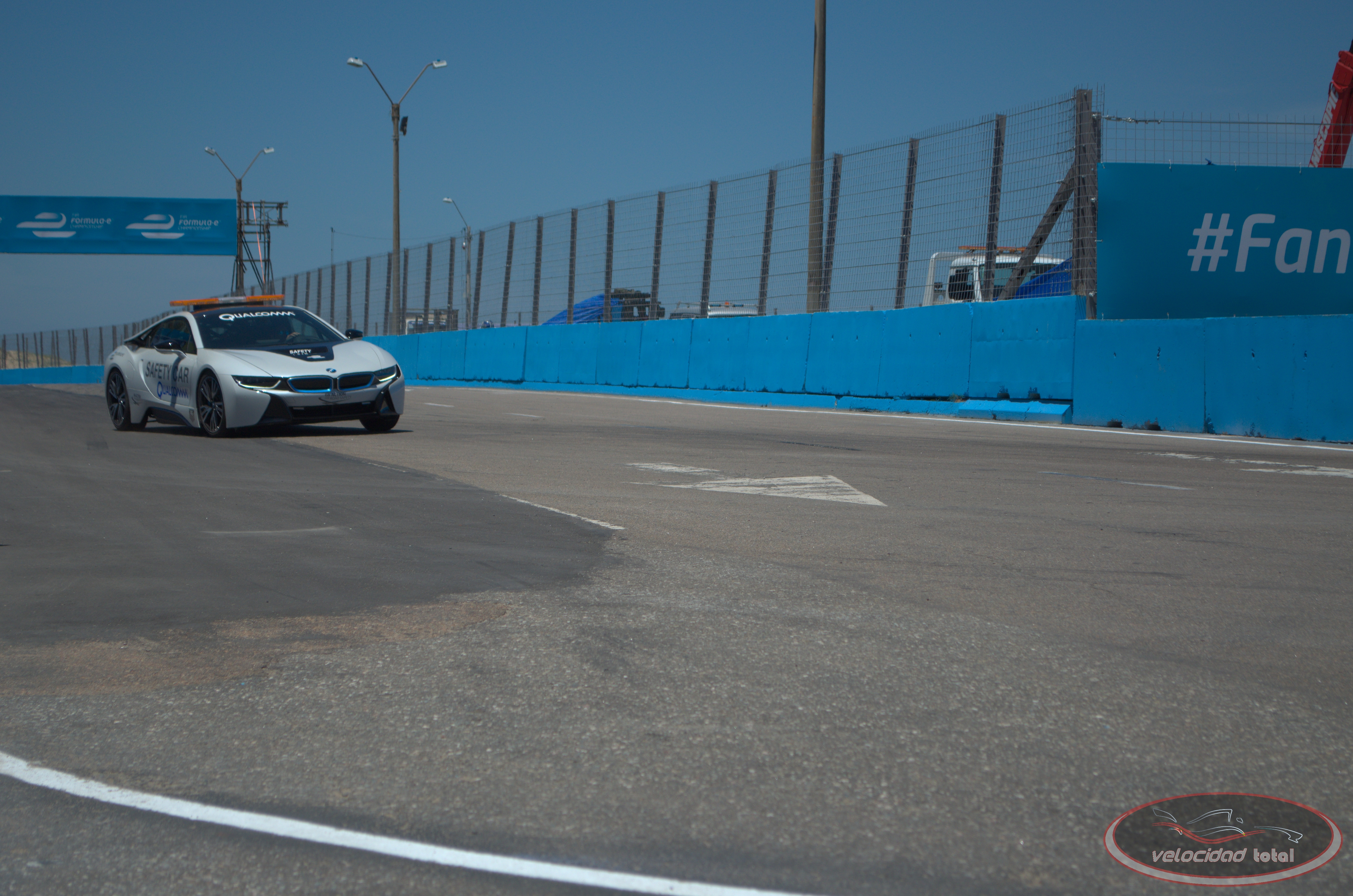
Correia driving the FIA Formula E safety car during the 2014 Punta del Este ePrix weekend.

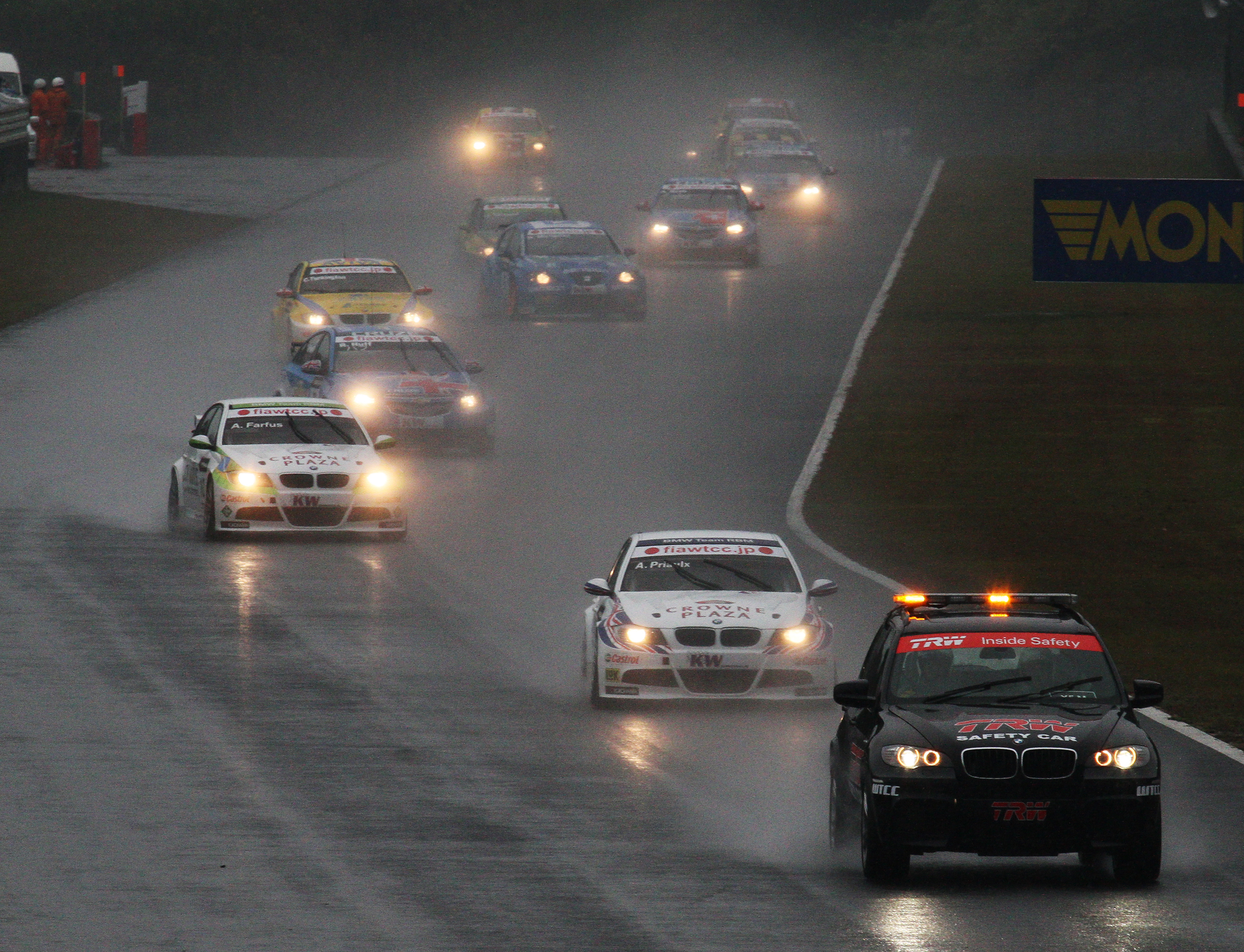
Correia driving the FIA WTCC safety car at the start of the 2010 FIA WTCC Race of Japan race 1.

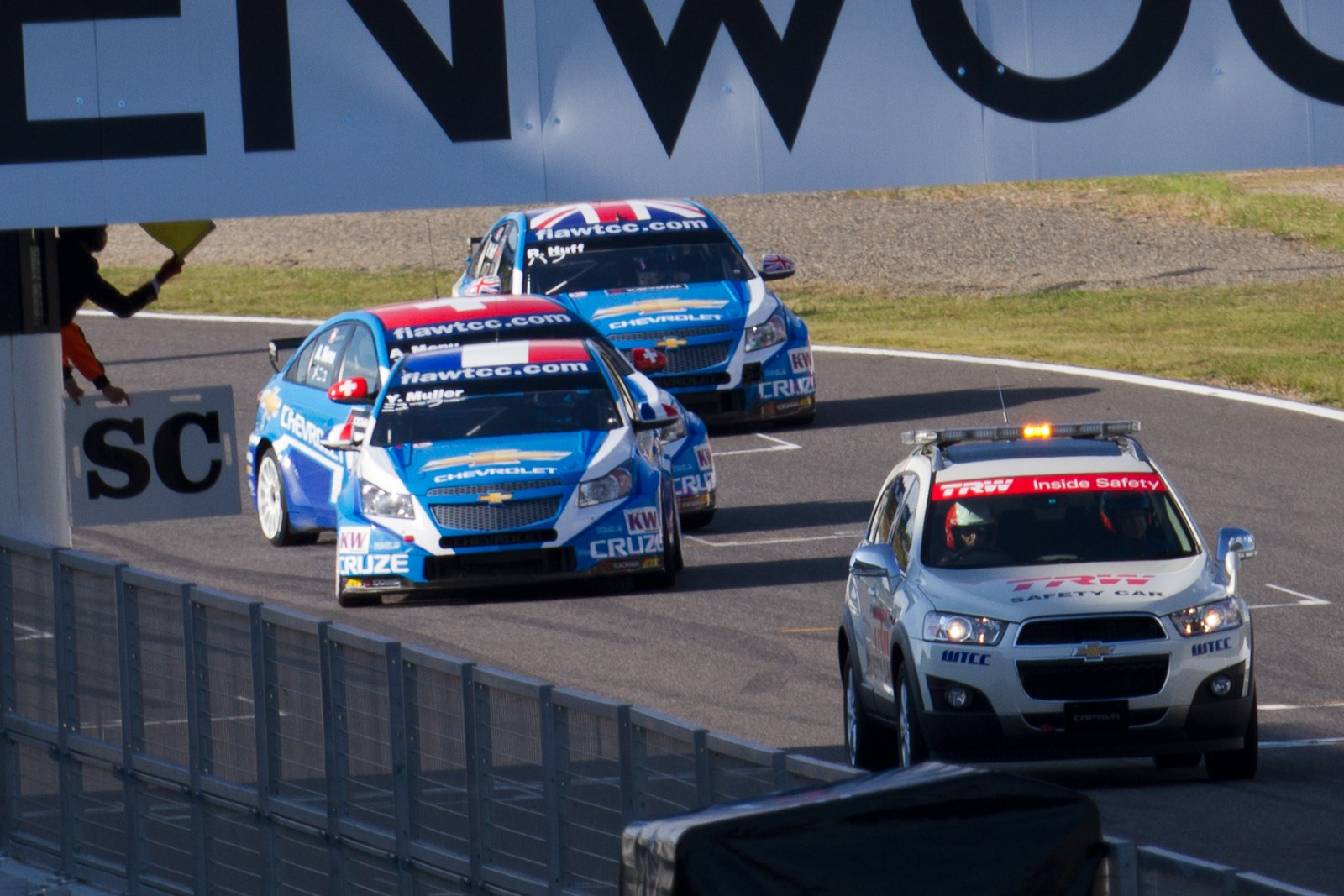
Correia driving the FIA WTCC safety car at the start of the 2011 FIA WTCC Race of Japan race 1.
