= Formula Mirage =

Shimizu Cup Formule Mirage Series
- Category: Single seaters
- Country: Japan
- Inaugural season: 1990
- Folded: 1995
- Constructors: Van Diemen; Reynard
- Engine suppliers: Mitsubishi
- Last Drivers' champion: Tsuyoshi Shimizu
- Last Constructors' champion: Reynard

The Formula Mirage was a racing class supported by the Japan Automobile Federation and Mitsubishi. This racing class was started in the same year as the more successful Formula Toyota and lasted for six years between 1990 and 1995.

== The cars ==
Formula Mirage was an open chassis class, open for all manufacturers. Only Van Diemen and Reynard Motorsports entered the series using converted Formula Ford 2000 chassis. All competitors had to use the same engine, the 2-liter, DOHC, 4-valve, Mitsubishi 4G63 engine. Despite the series name, the 4G63 engine was never used in a Mirage model, although the Mitsubishi Lancer Evolution series of cars which used the engines were based on the Mirage platform at the time the series ran.

== Champions ==
Year	Driver	Car
1990	Keiichi Tsuchiya	Van Diemen
1991	Eiji Yamada	Van Diemen
1992	Osamu Hagiwara	Van Diemen
1993	Shoichi Ito	Reynard MW001
1994	Takeshi Asami	Reynard MW001
1995	Tsuyoshi Shimizu	Reynard MW001

== All-time win list ==
Driver	1990	1991	1992	1993	1994	1995	Total
Takeshi Asami		1	1		4		6
Keiichi Tsuchiya	3						3
Osamu Hagiwara		1	2				3
Shoichi Ito				3			3
Shinichi Yamaji		2					2
Eiji Yamada		2					2
Hidetoshi Mitsusada			2				2
Takeshi Tsuchiya				2			2
Kenshi Yamamoto					1	1	2
Kono Taro						2	2
Tsuyoshi Shimizu						2	2
Hisashi Wada	1						1
Hashimoto Motokokorozashi	1						1
Sakae Obata				1			1
Hiroyuki Enomoto					1		1
Yasushi Oki						1	1
