= Formula König =

Racing series active from 1988 to 2004

- Category: Single-seaters
- Country: Germany
- Inaugural season: 1988
- Folded: 1 March 2005
- Engine suppliers: Fiat (1988–1989); Volkswagen (1990–2004)
- Tyre suppliers: Bridgestone
- Last Drivers' champion: (Germany) Ronny Wechselberger
- Last Teams' champion: (Germany) Böhm Motorsport

Formula König was a formula racing series based in Germany that ran from 1988 to 2004 as a one-design single-seater feeder series. It was founded by Richard König in 1987 and factory-backed by Volkswagen from 1997 to 2003.

In order to be eligible to compete in the series during its final season in 2004, drivers had to be at least 16 years old and complete its own training programme, with one of the goals of the series being to provide its participants with an opportunity to race in a single-seater series at a lower cost in comparison with the German Formula Three Championship and other feeder series at a comparable level.

The series built its own cars that, as of 2004, were powered by slightly modified production engines from Volkswagen and allowed to use the available sets of slick and wet-weather tyres from Bridgestone. It supplied the teams with all the cars and engines, managing all the spare parts and aerodynamic kits, and not allowing the teams to make any changes to the supplied cars and engines on their own.

The folding of the series was announced on 1 March 2005, before it could start what would have been its 18th season.

== History ==
Formula König was founded in 1987 by Richard König, a businessman from Baden-Württemberg and the owner of König Komfort- und Rennsitze GmbH, a company producing seats for road vehicles and sports cars.

The series' inaugural season took place in 1988 and featured ten races. The original cars were powered by a 1.0-litre engine produced by Fiat and the gearbox also came from the Italian manufacturer. The series' first champion was future seven-time Formula One world champion Michael Schumacher, who won nine of the ten races during the inaugural season.

For the 1989 season, the gearbox from Fiat was replaced by one from Hewland, which was purpose-built for race cars and hence believed to be better suited to the demands of auto racing than the previous season's gearbox that was largely identical to one used in the production model of the Fiat Panda at the time. In order to further adapt the series to the demands of auto racing, a new engine was chosen for the 1990 season, when the cars were powered by a 1.3-litre engine from Volkswagen, based on one available for the brand's most powerful production model of the Polo GT at the time and modified to produce 100 PS (74 kW), as opposed to 75 PS (55 kW) in its standard version.

The series was sponsored by the Automobilclub von Deutschland (AvD) from 1991 to 1995, whilst Dekra sponsored it from 1993 to 1995. After that, it was sponsored by the Deutscher Motorsport Verband (DMV) from 1996 until its final season in 2004. In the 1990s, the series ran in support of the German Grand Prix at the Hockenheimring on two occasions.

The original cars were redesigned and updated in 1996 and, with slight modifications in the following seasons, the new model remained in use until the series' final season in 2004. Ahead of the 1997 season, Volkswagen entered the series as its official sponsor and engine supplier, leading to the introduction of a new 1.4-litre 16-valve petrol engine that was largely identical to one of the engines that were available for the brand's production model of the Polo at the time, as it was only modified to make it suitable for single-seaters and had its output increased to 88 kW (120 PS), as opposed to 74 kW (101 PS) in its standard version.

After competing in the series early in their careers, some of its participants went on to drive in other formulae, such as the German Formula Three Championship, Formula Opel, Formula Renault and Formula Volkswagen. Others went on to compete in the Porsche Carrera Cup or become factory drivers for various German automotive brands. Apart from Schumacher, some of the most notable drivers to graduate from the series include Dirk Müller and Markus Winkelhock, who finished runners-up in 1993 and 1998, respectively.

Between 2000 and 2002, the series was at its peak, featuring around 30 drivers per season. Following Volkswagen's departure as its official sponsor and engine supplier at the conclusion of the 2003 season, the series continued to use the manufacturer's existing engines throughout the 2004 season and was seeking a new official engine supplier for the 2005 season. On 1 March 2005, however, it announced its folding, attributing its decision to a reduced number of participants and the financial difficulties that had emerged in the aftermath of Volkswagen's withdrawal as its sponsor. During the 2004 season, only 15 drivers competed in the series, including part-time entries, as opposed to 22 drivers during the 2003 season.

The series' final two seasons in 2003 and 2004 were each contested over 14 races held over seven weekends. The venues included permanent circuits in Germany (Hockenheimring, Nürburgring, Lausitzring, Motorsport Arena Oschersleben) and other European countries, including Austria (A1-Ring, Salzburgring), Belgium (Circuit Zolder) and the Czech Republic (Autodrom Most).

== Champions ==
Season	Champion	Team Champion
1988	(Germany) Michael Schumacher	(Germany) Hoecker Sportwagenservice
1989	(Germany) Thomas Winkelhock	(Germany) König Motorsport
1990	(Germany) Herbert Füngeling	(Germany) König Motorsport
1991	(Germany) Dirk Kisters	(Germany) Clever Automobil Club
1992	(Germany) Marian Hamprecht	(Germany) H&R Spezialfedern
1993	(Germany) Jörg Bergmeister	(Germany) Farnbacher Racing
1994	(Germany) Bernd Friedrich	(Germany) Lohmann Motorsport
1995	(Australia) Richard L. McLeod	(Germany) Schlag Rennsport
1996	(Germany) Thomas Mühlenz	(Germany) Kern Motorsport
1997	(Germany) Thomas Mühlenz	no data
1998	(Netherlands) Elran Nijenhuis	no data
1999	(Belgium) Benoit Allart	(Germany) Böhm Motorsport
2000	(Austria) Bernhard Auinger	(Germany) Motopark Academy
2001	(Germany) Thomas Westarp	(Germany) Kern Motorsport
2002	(Germany) Jochen Nerpel	(Germany) RS Racing Team
2003	(Austria) Franz Kuncic	(Germany) Kern Motorsport
2004	(Germany) Ronny Wechselberger	(Germany) Böhm Motorsport

== See also ==
- German Formula Three Championship
- ADAC Formel Masters
- ADAC Volkswagen Polo Cup
