= Spanish Formula Renault Championship =

Former Single-Seater Racing Championship

- Category: Formula Renault
- Country: Spain
- Inaugural season: 1991
- Folded: 1997
- Engine suppliers: Renault
- Last Drivers' champion: (Spain) Polo Villaamil

The Campeonato de España de Fórmula Renault was a Formula Renault racing series based in Spain. It ran from 1991 to 1997. In 1998, the series ended and became the World Series by Nissan, later by Renault.

== Champions ==
Season	Champion
1991	(Spain) Antonio Albacete
1992	(Spain) Ricardo García Galiano
1993	(Spain) David Bosch
1994	(Spain) Javier Díaz
1995	(Spain) Javier Díaz
1996	(Portugal) Bruno Correia
1997	(Spain) Polo Villaamil

== See also ==
- Formula 3.5 V8
- Formula Renault
