= List of Dutch & Benelux Formula Ford champions =

This article contains a list of champions in the Dutch and Benelux Formula Ford championship. (See talk)

== 1970-'92: 1600cc engine ==
Year	Dutch Formula Ford 1600	Team	Chassis
1970	(Netherlands) Huub Vermeulen		Lotus 61M
1971	(Netherlands) Huub Vermeulen		Lotus 69F
1972	(Netherlands) Roelof Wunderink		
1973	(Netherlands) Roelof Wunderink		
1974	(Netherlands) Boy Hayje		
1975	(Netherlands) Jim Vermeulen		
1976	(Netherlands) Michael Bleekemolen		
1977	(Netherlands) Roelof Wunderink		
1978	(Netherlands) Roelof Wunderink		
1979	(Netherlands) Boy Hayje		
1980	(Netherlands) Jim Vermeulen		
1981	(Netherlands) Cor Euser		Royale RP29
1982	(Netherlands) Gerrit van Kouwen		Van Diemen RF82
1983	(Netherlands) Gerrit van Kouwen		Van Diemen RF83
1984	(Netherlands) Maartin Bottelier		Lola
1985	(Netherlands) Maartin Bottelier		
1986	(Netherlands) Jaap Boekhoeven		Reynard 86F
1987	(Netherlands) Piet Bouwmeister		Mondiale M86S
1988	(Netherlands) Frank Eglem		Van Diemen RF88
1989	(Netherlands) Marcel Albers		
1990	(Netherlands) Frank ten Wolde		
1991	(Belgium) Vincent Radermecker		
1992	(Belgium) Kurt Mollekens		

== 1993-'97: 1800cc and 1600cc engines ==
The year 1993 saw the introduction of the 1800cc Zetec engine to the Dutch and Benelux championship. It had a slow start so the older 1600cc Kent engine was maintained to keep competition numbers up.

Year	Dutch Formula Ford 1800	Team	Chassis	Benelux Formula Ford 1800	Team	Chassis	Dutch Formula Ford 1600	Team	Chassis	Benelux Formula Ford 1600	Team	Chassis
1993	(Netherlands) Tom Coronel	Fresh Racing	Vector TF93	(Belgium) Geoffroy Horion	MB Racing	Van Diemen RF93				(Netherlands) Marcel Kooy	Fresh Racing	
1994				(Belgium) Bas Leinders	MB Racing	Van Diemen RF94	(Netherlands) Ron Swart	GEVA Racing		(Netherlands) Ron Swart	GEVA Racing	
1995	(Netherlands) Sepp Koster									(Netherlands) Marijn van Kalmthout	GEVA Racing	
1996	(Netherlands) Sebastiaan Bleekemolen	GEVA Racing		(Netherlands) Sebastiaan Bleekemolen	GEVA Racing		(Denmark) Allan Berndt	Pennzoil Racing	Van Diemen RF92	(Denmark) Allan Berndt	Pennzoil Racing	Van Diemen RF92
1997	(Netherlands) Christijan Albers									(Netherlands) Patrick Koel	GEVA Racing	

== 1998-2006: Zetec engines ==
Since 1998, in both the Dutch and Benelux championships the rules state that participants should use an 1800 cc engine. The first division championship mentioned in this list is a subchampionship, for participants with cars of two years and older of age.

Year	Dutch Champion	Team	Chassis	First Division Champion	Team	Chassis	Benelux Champion	Team	Chassis	First Division Champion	Team	Chassis
1998	(Netherlands) Jeroen Bleekemolen	GEVA Racing		(Netherlands) Isaac van der Slik			(Netherlands) Jeroen Bleekemolen	GEVA Racing		(Belgium) André van Hoof		
1999	(Netherlands) Vincent van der Valk	Team Dbr					(Republic of Ireland) Peter Walsh	Van Kalmthout Racing		(Belgium) André van Hoof		
2000	(Netherlands) Patrick Koel	MP Motorsport		(Netherlands) Stefan de Groot			(Belgium) Mike den Tandt			(Netherlands) Stefan de Groot		
2001	(Netherlands) Stefan de Groot	GEVA Racing		(Belgium) Olivier Muytjens			(Netherlands) Jaap van Lagen			(Belgium) Olivier Muytjens		
2002	(Netherlands) Jaap van Lagen	MP Motorsport		(Netherlands) Marijn van Kalmthout			(Netherlands) Jaap van Lagen	MP Motorsport		(Netherlands) Marijn van Kalmthout		
2003	(Netherlands) Nelson van der Pol	GEVA Racing	Mygale SJ03	(Netherlands) Helmert-Jan van der Slik	GEVA Racing	Mygale SJ00	(Netherlands) Michel Florie	Private	Mygale SJ01	(Netherlands) Helmert-Jan van der Slik	GEVA Racing	SJ00
2004	(Netherlands) Michel Florie	Private	Mygale SJ01	(Netherlands) Dennis Retera	GEVA racing	Mygale SJ00	(Netherlands) Helmert-Jan van der Slik	SL Racing	Mygale SJ03	(Netherlands) Dennis Retera	GEVA Racing	Mygale SJ00
2005	(Netherlands) Dennis Retera	GEVA racing	Mygale SJ05	(Netherlands) Jan Paul van Dongen	Race2Win	Van Diemen RF00	(Netherlands) Dennis Retera	GEVA Racing	Mygale SJ05	(Netherlands) Jan Paul van Dongen	Race2Win	Van Diemen RF00
2006	(Netherlands) Michel Florie	Private	Mygale SJ01	(Netherlands) Nicky Catsburg	GEVA Racing	Mygale SJ00	(Netherlands) Michel Florie	Private	Mygale SJ01	(Netherlands) Nicky Catsburg	GEVA Racing	Mygale SJ00

== 2007: Introduction of the Duratec engines ==
In 2007 a new brand of engines was attracted to the championship. The 1600cc Duratec engines were 30 kilos lighter than the old 1800cc Zetec engines but also more powerful. Cars with the new Duratec engines formed the A-class while cars with the old Zetec engines formed the First Division class.

Year	Dutch A-Class Champion	Team	Chassis	Dutch First Division Champion	Team	Chassis	Benelux A-Class Champion	Team	Chassis	Benelux First Division Champion	Team	Chassis
2007	(Netherlands) Franceso Pastorelli	GEVA Racing	Mygale SJ07	(Netherlands) Auke Genemans	GEVA Racing	Mygale SJ04	(Netherlands) Franceso Pastorelli	GEVA Racing	Mygale SJ07	(Netherlands) Auke Genemans	GEVA Racing	Mygale SJ04
2008	(Netherlands) Simon Knap	KTG Racing	Mygale SJ07	(Netherlands) Arthur van Uitert								
2009	(Netherlands) Melroy Heemskerk	Geva Racing	Mygale SJ07	(Netherlands) Arthur van Uitert								
2010	(Netherlands) Rogier Jongejans	Geva Racing	Mygale SJ07									
2011	(Netherlands) Joey van Splunteren	Provily Racing	Mygale SJ08									
2012	(Netherlands) Michel Florie	Geva Racing	Mygale SJ09									
