= New Zealand Touring Car Championship =

- Category: Touring car racing
- Country: New Zealand
- Inaugural season: 1984
- Folded: 2002
- Last Drivers' champion: Barrie Thomlinson

The New Zealand Touring Car Championship was a motor racing title which was contested in New Zealand from 1984 to 2002.

== Results ==
| Season | Champion | Vehicle |
|---|---|---|
| 1984 | Gary Sprague | Ford XD Falcon |
| 1985 | Kent Baigent | BMW 635 CSi |
| 1986 | Graeme Bowkett | Holden VK Commodore |
| 1987 | Glenn McIntyre | BMW 635 CSi |
| 1988 | Trevor Crowe | BMW M3 |
| 1989 | Robbie Francevic | Ford Sierra RS500 |
| 1990 | Robbie Francevic | Ford Sierra RS500 |
| 1991 | Brett Riley | BMW M3 |
| 1992 | Graeme Crosby | Ford Sierra RS500 |
| 1993 | Ed Lamont | Holden VP Commodore |
| 1994 | Craig Baird | BMW 325i |
| 1995 | Craig Baird | BMW 325i |
| 1996 | Craig Baird | BMW 325i |
| 1997 | Craig Baird | BMW 320i |
| 1998 | Brett Riley | BMW 325i |
| 1999 | Jason Richards | BMW 325i |
| 2000 | Jason Richards | BMW 325i |
| 2001 | Jason Richards | Nissan Primera |
| 2002 | Barrie Thomlinson | Toyota Altezza |

== See also ==
- NZ Touring Cars championship
