= 2006 British Formula 3 International Series =

56th annual British Formula 3 season

Seasons
- ← 2005 2007 →

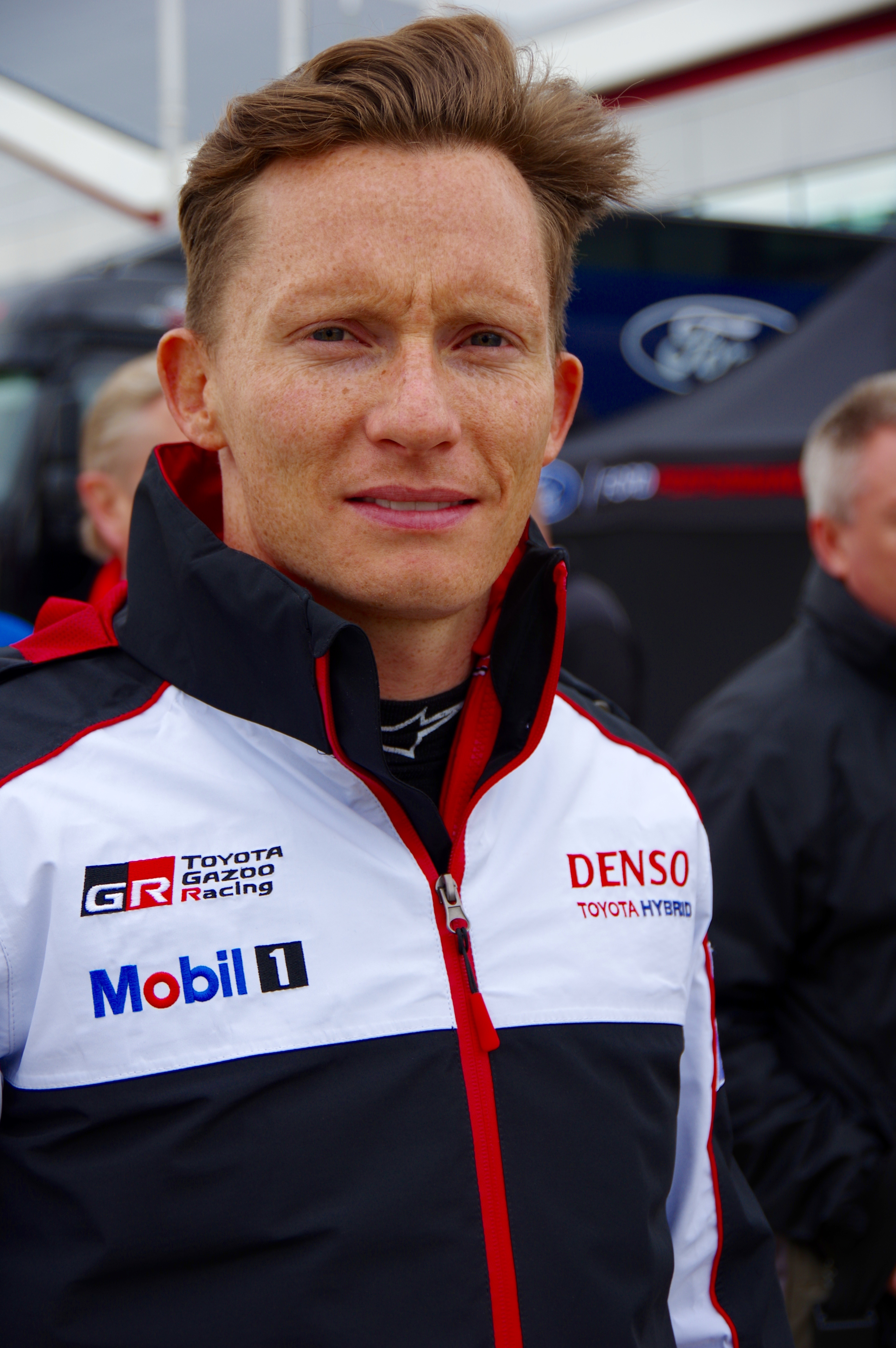
2006 Championship Class champion, Mike Conway

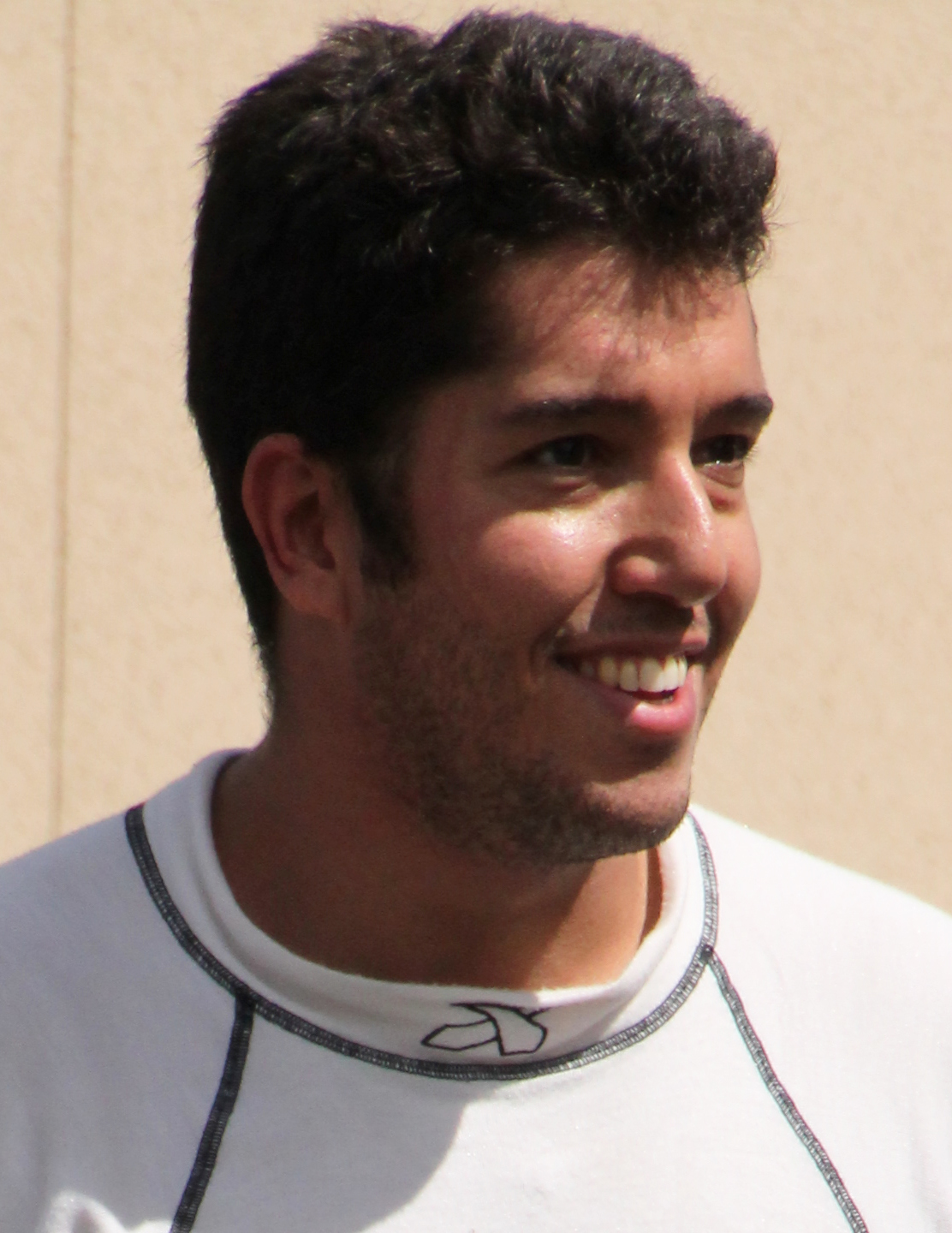
2006 National Class champion, Rodolfo González

The 2006 British Formula 3 International Series was the 56th British Formula 3 International Series season. It commenced on 17 April 2006 and ended on 1 October after twenty-two races.

The scoring system was 20-15-12-10-8-6-4-3-2-1 points awarded to the first ten finishers, with one extra point added to the driver who set the fastest lap of the race. If a Class B driver or a guest driver finished among the top finishers, he would not score points for the main championship, and the points would be awarded to the next driver in the standings.

The season finale was at Thruxton on the weekend of 30 September 2006.

== Drivers and teams ==
The following teams and drivers were competitors in the 2006 British Formula 3 International Series. The National class is for year-old Formula Three cars. Teams in the Invitation class are not series regulars, and do not compete for championship points.

Team	Chassis	Engine	No	Driver	Rounds
Championship Class
(United Kingdom) Carlin Motorsport	Dallara F306	Mugen-Honda	1	(Denmark) Christian Bakkerud	All
(United Kingdom) Carlin Motorsport	Dallara F306	Mugen-Honda	2	(United Kingdom) Oliver Jarvis	All
(United Kingdom) Carlin Motorsport	Dallara F306	Mugen-Honda	11	(Japan) Keiko Ihara	All
(United Kingdom) Carlin Motorsport	Dallara F306	Mugen-Honda	12	(Germany) Maro Engel	All
(United Kingdom) Fortec Motorsport	Dallara F306	Mercedes HWA	3	(Netherlands) Yelmer Buurman	All
(United Kingdom) Fortec Motorsport	Dallara F306	Mercedes HWA	4	(United Kingdom) Stuart Hall	1-5
(United Kingdom) Fortec Motorsport	Dallara F306	Mercedes HWA	14	(United Kingdom) Charlie Hollings	1-4
(United Kingdom) Hitech Racing	Dallara F306	Mercedes HWA	5	(Mexico) Salvador Durán	1-10
(United Kingdom) Hitech Racing	Dallara F306	Mercedes HWA	6	(United Kingdom) James Jakes	All
(United Kingdom) Hitech Racing	Dallara F306	Mercedes HWA	15	(United Kingdom) James Walker	All
(United Kingdom) T-Sport	Dallara F306	Mugen-Honda	7	(Netherlands) Dennis Retera	1-3
(United Kingdom) T-Sport	Dallara F306	Mugen-Honda	7	(United Kingdom) Stuart Hall	7-11
(United Kingdom) Promatecme	Lola B05-30	Mugen-Honda	8	(Lebanon) Alexander Khateeb	6-7
(United Kingdom) Alan Docking Racing	Dallara F306	Mugen-Honda	9	(United Kingdom) Jonathan Kennard	All
(United Kingdom) Alan Docking Racing	Dallara F306	Mugen-Honda	10	(Australia) Karl Reindler	2-10
(Brazil) Cesário Formula UK	Dallara F306	Mugen-Honda	16	(Brazil) Alberto Valerio	All
(United Kingdom) Räikkönen Robertson Racing	Dallara F306	Mercedes HWA	21	(Brazil) Bruno Senna	All
(United Kingdom) Räikkönen Robertson Racing	Dallara F306	Mercedes HWA	22	(United Kingdom) Stephen Jelley	All
(United Kingdom) Räikkönen Robertson Racing	Dallara F306	Mercedes HWA	26	(United Kingdom) Mike Conway	All
National Class
(United Kingdom) T-Sport	Dallara F304	Mugen-Honda	32	(Venezuela) Rodolfo González	All
(United Kingdom) Promatecme	Dallara F304	Mugen-Honda	33	(Lebanon) Alexander Khateeb	2-5
(United Kingdom) Promatecme	Dallara F304	Mugen-Honda	33	(United Kingdom) Alex Waters	8-11
(United Kingdom) Carlin Motorsport	Dallara F304	Mugen-Honda	34	(Angola) Ricardo Teixeira	1-2
(United Kingdom) Fluid Motorsport	Lola-Dome F105	Mugen-Honda	35	(Sweden) Martin Kudzak	1-3, 5-8
(United Kingdom) Fluid Motorsport	Lola-Dome F105	Mugen-Honda	37	(South Africa) Cristiano Morgado	All
(Sweden) Performance Racing Europe	Dallara F304	Mugen-Honda	38	(Macau) Rodolfo Ávila	All
(Sweden) Performance Racing Europe	Dallara F304	Mugen-Honda	39	(Finland) Juho Annala	All
(Sweden) Performance Racing Europe	Dallara F304	Mugen-Honda	40	(Angola) Ricardo Teixeira	3-7
Invitation Entries
(United Kingdom) Fortec Motorsport	Dallara F306	Mercedes HWA	44	(United Kingdom) Leo Mansell	11
(United Kingdom) Fortec Motorsport	Dallara F306	Mercedes HWA	50	(United Kingdom) Greg Mansell	11
(France) Signature-Plus	Dallara F306	Mercedes	62	(United States) Charlie Kimball	3
(France) Signature-Plus	Dallara F306	Mercedes	63	(France) Romain Grosjean	3
(France) Signature-Plus	Dallara F306	Mercedes	64	(France) Guillaume Moreau	3
(Belgium) Bas Leinders Racing	Dallara F306	Mercedes HWA	65	(Belgium) Michael Herck	6
(United Kingdom) Carlin Motorsport	Dallara F304	Mugen-Honda	66	(Brazil) Mario Moraes	6-7
(United Kingdom) Räikkönen Robertson Racing	Dallara F306	Mercedes HWA	68	(United Kingdom) Danny Watts	11
(United Kingdom) Comtec F3	Dallara F304	Mugen-Honda	77	(Lebanon) Basil Shaaban	6-8
(Italy) Passoli Racing	Dallara F304	Opel Spiess	80	(Italy) Mauro Massironi	9
(Italy) Corbetta Competizioni	Dallara F304	Opel Spiess	82	(Italy) Fabrizio Crestani	9
(United Kingdom) Team Loctite	Dallara F304	Mugen-Honda	84	(United Kingdom) Oliver Turvey	11

== Results ==
Round	Circuit	Date	Pole position	Fastest lap	Winning driver	Winning team	National Class Winner
1	(United Kingdom) Oulton Park	17 April	(Brazil) Bruno Senna	(United Kingdom) Stephen Jelley	(Brazil) Bruno Senna	(United Kingdom) Räikkönen Robertson Racing	(Venezuela) Rodolfo González
2	(United Kingdom) Oulton Park	17 April	(United Kingdom) Mike Conway	(Brazil) Bruno Senna	(Brazil) Bruno Senna	(United Kingdom) Räikkönen Robertson Racing	(Venezuela) Rodolfo González
3	(United Kingdom) Donington Park	21 May	(United Kingdom) Mike Conway	(United Kingdom) Stephen Jelley	(Brazil) Bruno Senna	(United Kingdom) Räikkönen Robertson Racing	(Venezuela) Rodolfo González
4	(United Kingdom) Donington Park	21 May	(United Kingdom) Mike Conway	(Brazil) Bruno Senna	(United Kingdom) Mike Conway	(United Kingdom) Räikkönen Robertson Racing	(Venezuela) Rodolfo González
5	(France) Pau Circuit	5 June	(France) Romain Grosjean	(United Kingdom) Mike Conway^{1}	(France) Romain Grosjean	(France) Signature-Plus	(Venezuela) Rodolfo González
6	(France) Pau Circuit	5 June	(France) Guillaume Moreau	(United Kingdom) Mike Conway^{1}	(France) Romain Grosjean	(France) Signature-Plus	(Finland) Juho Annala
7	(Republic of Ireland) Mondello Park	25 June	(Brazil) Bruno Senna	(Brazil) Bruno Senna	(Brazil) Bruno Senna	(United Kingdom) Räikkönen Robertson Racing	(Venezuela) Rodolfo González
8	(Republic of Ireland) Mondello Park	25 June	(United Kingdom) Oliver Jarvis	(United Kingdom) Oliver Jarvis	(United Kingdom) Oliver Jarvis	(United Kingdom) Carlin Motorsport	(Venezuela) Rodolfo González
9	(United Kingdom) Snetterton Motor Racing Circuit	16 July	(United Kingdom) Mike Conway	(United Kingdom) Mike Conway	(United Kingdom) Mike Conway	(United Kingdom) Räikkönen Robertson Racing	(Venezuela) Rodolfo González
10	(United Kingdom) Snetterton Motor Racing Circuit	16 July	(United Kingdom) Oliver Jarvis	(United Kingdom) Oliver Jarvis	(United Kingdom) Mike Conway	(United Kingdom) Räikkönen Robertson Racing	(Finland) Juho Annala
11	(Belgium) Circuit de Spa-Francorchamps	28 July	(Germany) Maro Engel	(United Kingdom) James Jakes	(Netherlands) Yelmer Buurman	(United Kingdom) Fortec Motorsport	(Venezuela) Rodolfo González
12	(Belgium) Circuit de Spa-Francorchamps	29 July	(Germany) Maro Engel	(Germany) Maro Engel	(Germany) Maro Engel	(United Kingdom) Carlin Motorsport	(Venezuela) Rodolfo González
13	(United Kingdom) Silverstone Circuit	13 August	(Brazil) Bruno Senna	(Brazil) Bruno Senna	(United Kingdom) Mike Conway	(United Kingdom) Räikkönen Robertson Racing	(Sweden) Martin Kudzak
14	(United Kingdom) Silverstone Circuit	13 August	(United Kingdom) Mike Conway	(Denmark) Christian Bakkerud	(United Kingdom) Mike Conway	(United Kingdom) Räikkönen Robertson Racing	(Venezuela) Rodolfo González
15	(United Kingdom) Brands Hatch	27 August	(United Kingdom) Mike Conway	(Germany) Maro Engel	(United Kingdom) Mike Conway	(United Kingdom) Räikkönen Robertson Racing	(Venezuela) Rodolfo González
16	(United Kingdom) Brands Hatch	27 August	(United Kingdom) Oliver Jarvis	(United Kingdom) Oliver Jarvis	(United Kingdom) Oliver Jarvis	(United Kingdom) Carlin Motorsport	(South Africa) Cristiano Morgado
17	(Italy) Mugello	16 September	(United Kingdom) Oliver Jarvis	(Denmark) Christian Bakkerud	(Denmark) Christian Bakkerud	(United Kingdom) Carlin Motorsport	(Venezuela) Rodolfo González
18	(Italy) Mugello	17 September	(United Kingdom) Oliver Jarvis	(Brazil) Bruno Senna	(Brazil) Bruno Senna	(United Kingdom) Räikkönen Robertson Racing	(South Africa) Cristiano Morgado
19	(United Kingdom) Silverstone	24 September	(United Kingdom) Mike Conway	(United Kingdom) Mike Conway	(United Kingdom) Mike Conway	(United Kingdom) Räikkönen Robertson Racing	(South Africa) Cristiano Morgado
20	(United Kingdom) Silverstone	24 September	(United Kingdom) Mike Conway	(United Kingdom) Mike Conway	(United Kingdom) Mike Conway	(United Kingdom) Räikkönen Robertson Racing	(Finland) Juho Annala
21	(United Kingdom) Thruxton	1 October	(United Kingdom) Danny Watts	(Denmark) Christian Bakkerud	(United Kingdom) Danny Watts	(United Kingdom) Räikkönen Robertson Racing	(Venezuela) Rodolfo González
22	(United Kingdom) Thruxton	1 October	(Germany) Maro Engel	(Brazil) Alberto Valerio	(Netherlands) Yelmer Buurman	(United Kingdom) Fortec Motorsport	(South Africa) Cristiano Morgado

- ^{1} Fastest lap recorded by Romain Grosjean, but he was ineligible to score the fastest lap point.

== Standings ==
=== Championship Class ===
Pos	Driver	OUL (United Kingdom)		DON (United Kingdom)		PAU (France)		MON (Republic of Ireland)		SNE (United Kingdom)		SPA (Belgium)		SIL (United Kingdom)		BRH (United Kingdom)		MUG (Italy)		SIL (United Kingdom)		THR (United Kingdom)		Pts
1	(United Kingdom) Mike Conway	5	3	7	1	2	3	2	3	1	1	4	2	1	1	1	3	6	3	1	1	Ret	4	321
2	(United Kingdom) Oliver Jarvis	3	4	4	Ret	3	7	4	1	4	2	5	12	4	3	4	1	Ret	2	2	3	2	3	250
3	(Brazil) Bruno Senna	1	1	1	4	11	10	1	5	Ret	DNS	3	3	2	8	7	5	10	1	4	2	4	6	229
4	(Netherlands) Yelmer Buurman	6	9	5	3	7	4	6	7	5	6	1	6	3	Ret	3	4	4	Ret	5	4	Ret	1	186
5	(Germany) Maro Engel	4	5	Ret	2	5	5	5	8	Ret	3	2	1	10	5	2	2	Ret	4	9	9	9	Ret	174
6	(Denmark) Christian Bakkerud	7	2	9	Ret	Ret	12	11	4	Ret	7	7	Ret	12	2	10	9	1	6	3	7	5	2	129
7	(United Kingdom) Stephen Jelley	2	11	3	Ret	Ret	9	3	12	7	4	11	8	7	13	5	8	2	9	6	16	3	5	126
8	(United Kingdom) James Jakes	8	Ret	12	9	8	13	10	6	2	5	8	14	8	10	6	7	5	5	8	5	12	8	96
9	(United Kingdom) James Walker	Ret	DNS	2	Ret	9	Ret	13	2	3	8	6	10	5	7	9	6	8	Ret	7	6	NC	11	92
10	(Mexico) Salvador Durán	Ret	18	6	Ret	Ret	8	Ret	DNS	6	Ret	13	5	6	4	11	12	7	7	10	10			54
11	(Brazil) Alberto Valerio	Ret	7	Ret	Ret	13	11	8	16	9	Ret	Ret	21	20	11	12	Ret	3	8	14	12	6	7	42
12	(United Kingdom) Jonathan Kennard	10	Ret	8	10	10	14	7	Ret	Ret	9	9	4	11	6	20	11	Ret	Ret	11	11	Ret	9	36
13	(United Kingdom) Stuart Hall	9	6	10	Ret	Ret	DNS	Ret	9	8	10			9	12	8	10	Ret	10	12	8	7	10	32
14	(Australia) Karl Reindler			16	6	Ret	Ret	9	10	10	11	10	7	Ret	9	16	13	11	12	13	Ret			18
15	(Netherlands) Dennis Retera	Ret	12	11	5	Ret	18																	8
16	(United Kingdom) Charlie Hollings	12	10	14	8	Ret	DNS	12	11															6
17	(Japan) Keiko Ihara	Ret	19	20	11	16	Ret	18	15	14	18	12	17	Ret	17	17	Ret	12	19	16	13	17	15	2
	(Lebanon) Alexander Khateeb											Ret	Ret	Ret	Ret									0
Guest drivers ineligible for points
	(France) Romain Grosjean					1	1																	0
	(United Kingdom) Danny Watts																					1	DNS	0
	(France) Guillaume Moreau					6	2																	0
	(United States) Charlie Kimball					4	6																	0
	(United Kingdom) Greg Mansell																					8	18	0
	(Belgium) Michael Herck											DNS	9											0
	(United Kingdom) Leo Mansell																					14	13	0
National Class
1	(Venezuela) Rodolfo González	11	8	13	7	12	Ret	14	13	11	14	14	13	19	14	13	16	9	13	18	Ret	10	Ret	355
2	(South Africa) Cristiano Morgado	13	13	15	13	17	DNS	16	14	12	13	16	15	16	16	15	14	17	11	15	Ret	13	12	300
3	(Finland) Juho Annala	14	16	Ret	Ret	14	15	15	17	13	12	17	16	15	18	14	15	Ret	16	17	14	11	Ret	258
4	(Macau) Rodolfo Ávila	Ret	15	18	14	Ret	16	17	19	15	16	20	Ret	17	19	18	Ret	16	18	20	15	18	17	182
5	(Sweden) Martin Kudzak	16	14	19	12	Ret	EX			16	17	19	18	14	20	DNS	DNS							105
6	(United Kingdom) Alex Waters															19	17	13	17	19	Ret	16	14	78
7	(Angola) Ricardo Teixeira	15	17	17	Ret	15	Ret	19	Ret	17	Ret	21	20	Ret	21									74
8	(Lebanon) Alexander Khateeb			Ret	Ret	Ret	17	20	18	18	15													42
Guest drivers ineligible for points
	(Brazil) Mario Moraes											15	11	13	15									0
	(Italy) Mauro Massironi																	14	15					0
	(Italy) Fabrizio Crestani																	15	14					0
	(United Kingdom) Oliver Turvey																					15	16	0
	(Lebanon) Basil Shaaban											18	19	18	Ret	DNS	DNS							0
Pos	Driver	OUL (United Kingdom)		DON (United Kingdom)		PAU (France)		MON (Republic of Ireland)		SNE (United Kingdom)		SPA (Belgium)		SIL (United Kingdom)		BRH (United Kingdom)		MUG (Italy)		SIL (United Kingdom)		THR (United Kingdom)		Pts

Colour	Result
Gold	Winner
Silver	Second place
Bronze	Third place
Green	Points classification
Blue	Non-points classification
Blue	Non-classified finish (NC)
Purple	Retired, not classified (Ret)
Red	Did not qualify (DNQ)
Red	Did not pre-qualify (DNPQ)
Black	Disqualified (DSQ)
White	Did not start (DNS)
White	Withdrew (WD)
White	Race cancelled (C)
Blank	Did not practice (DNP)
Blank	Did not arrive (DNA)
Blank	Excluded (EX)
