= Basil Shaaban =

Lebanese racing driver (born 1980)

- Nationality: (Lebanon) Lebanese
- Born: 27 March 1980 (age 46) Beirut, Lebanon
- Debut season: 2007
- Current team: Prema Powerteam

F3 Euroseries
- Car number: 5
- Former teams: HBR Motorsport
- Starts: 60
- Wins: 0
- Poles: 0
- Fastest laps: 0
- Best finish: 17th in 2009

Previous series
- 2005 2005 2005–06, 2006–07 2006, 2008: Italian F3; 3000 Pro Series; A1 Grand Prix; British F3

Basil Shaaban (born 27 March 1980 in Beirut) is a Lebanese racing driver.

== Early racing ==
Shaaban began racing in Lebanon at the age of 14 at the Circuit des Champions karting center near Brummana. Eventually, he worked his way up to driving 16 horsepower (12 kW) 100 cc 2-stroke karts.

== Racing in university ==
While a student at University of California, Berkeley, Shaaban bought a 23 horsepower (17 kW) 100 cc kart from Trackmagic and began racing in the Northern California region alongside his studies. Over the next few years he won several races. Shaaban graduated with a bachelor degree in astrophysics from Berkeley.

== Entry into formula cars ==
After graduating from Berkeley, in 2004, Shaaban began racing in Formula Renault 2000 in the USA and Formula Ford 1800 in the United Kingdom. He became the first Arab to win a Formula Ford 1800 race in Europe.

== A1 Grand Prix ==
Shaaban was one of A1 Team Lebanon's drivers for the inaugural 2005–06 season of the series, alongside Khalil Beschir and American Graham Rahal. None of the drivers scored any points. However, Shaaban scored Lebanon's highest finishing position of the season in the feature race in Estoril, finishing 11th out of 24.

Shaaban inaugurated A1 Team Lebanon's second season when he raced at the A1GP 2006–07 season opener in Zandvoort, the Netherlands.

== Formula Three Euroseries ==
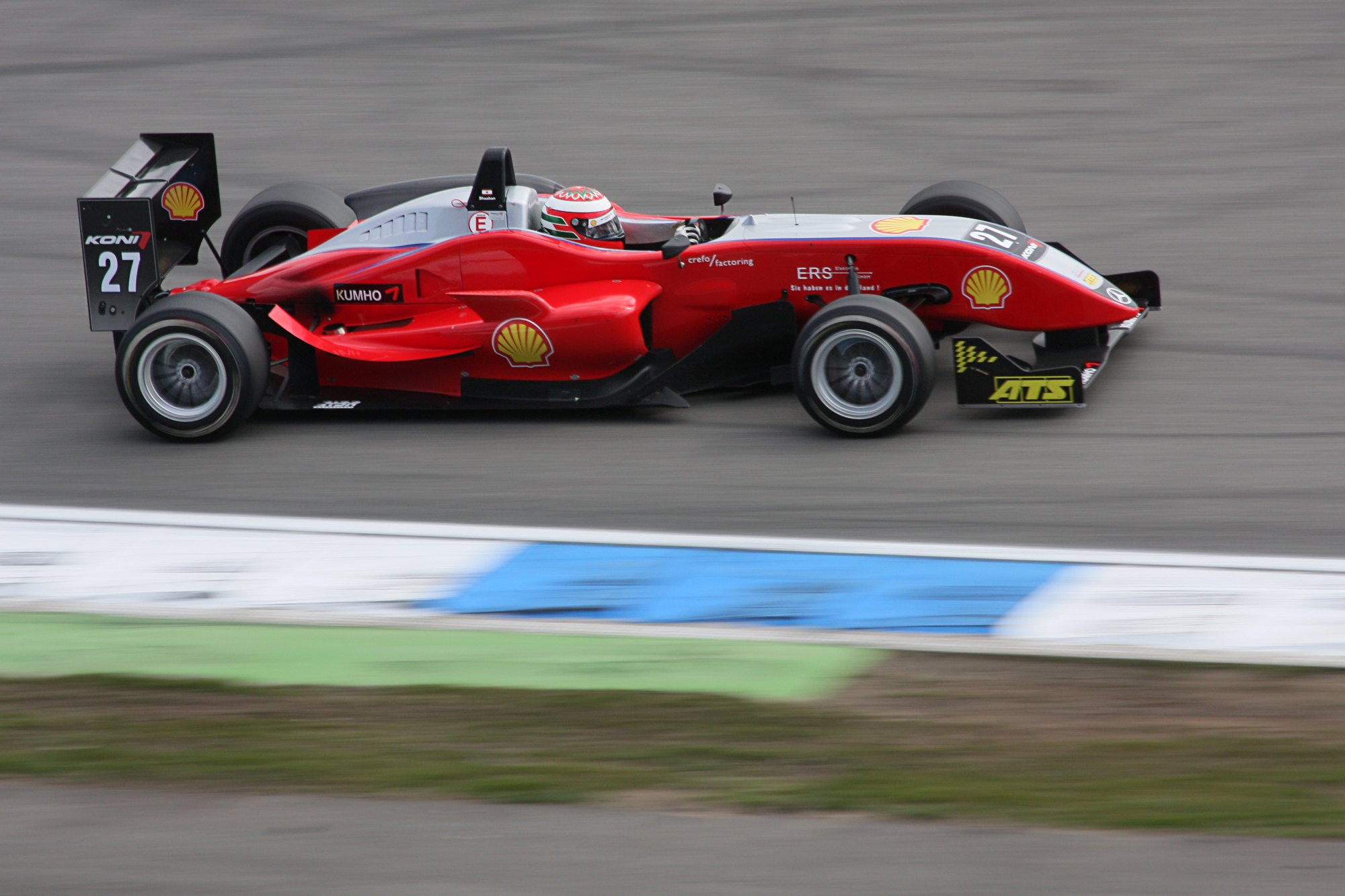
Shaaban during the opening round of the 2009 Formula Three Euroseries season at Hockenheim.

Shaaban competed in the Formula Three Euroseries beginning in 2007, which was his first full season of car racing. He spent his first two seasons (2007-2008) at HBR Motorsport, before moving to Prema Powerteam for the 2009 season. In his 55th race, Shaaban took both his first top-ten finish and his first Euroseries points (seventh) in Barcelona. In the second race, he started from the front row due to the series' reverse-grid system for the top eight finishers in the first race. Although he was passed by Alexander Sims, Shaaban finished third. In 2009, he finished 12th in the Masters of F3 at Zandvoort.

== Complete A1 Grand Prix results ==
(key) (Races in bold indicate pole position) (Races in italics indicate fastest lap)

| Year | Entrant | 1 | 2 | 3 | 4 | 5 | 6 | 7 | 8 | 9 | 10 | 11 | 12 | 13 | 14 | 15 | 16 | 17 | 18 | 19 | 20 | 21 | 22 | DC | Points |
|---|---|---|---|---|---|---|---|---|---|---|---|---|---|---|---|---|---|---|---|---|---|---|---|---|---|
| 2005–06 | Lebanon | GBR; SPR; PO | GBR; FEA; PO | GER; SPR | GER; FEA | POR; SPR; 18 | POR; FEA; 11 | AUS; SPR; Ret | AUS; FEA; 12 | MYS; SPR | MYS; FEA | UAE; SPR; Ret | UAE; FEA; 16 | RSA; SPR; 17 | RSA; FEA; Ret | IDN; SPR; 17 | IDN; FEA; Ret | MEX; SPR | MEX; FEA | USA; SPR | USA; FEA | CHN; SPR | CHN; FEA | **23rd** | **0** |
| 2006–07 | Lebanon | NED; SPR; 16 | NED; FEA; Ret | CZE; SPR | CZE; FEA | CHN; SPR; 19 | CHN; FEA; 13 | MYS; SPR | MYS; FEA | IDN; SPR; 19 | IDN; FEA; Ret | NZL; SPR | NZL; FEA | AUS; SPR | AUS; FEA | RSA; SPR | RSA; FEA | MEX; SPR | MEX; FEA | CHN; SPR | CHN; FEA | GBR; SPR | GBR; SPR | **23rd** | **0** |
