= Mike Conway =

British racing driver (born 1983)

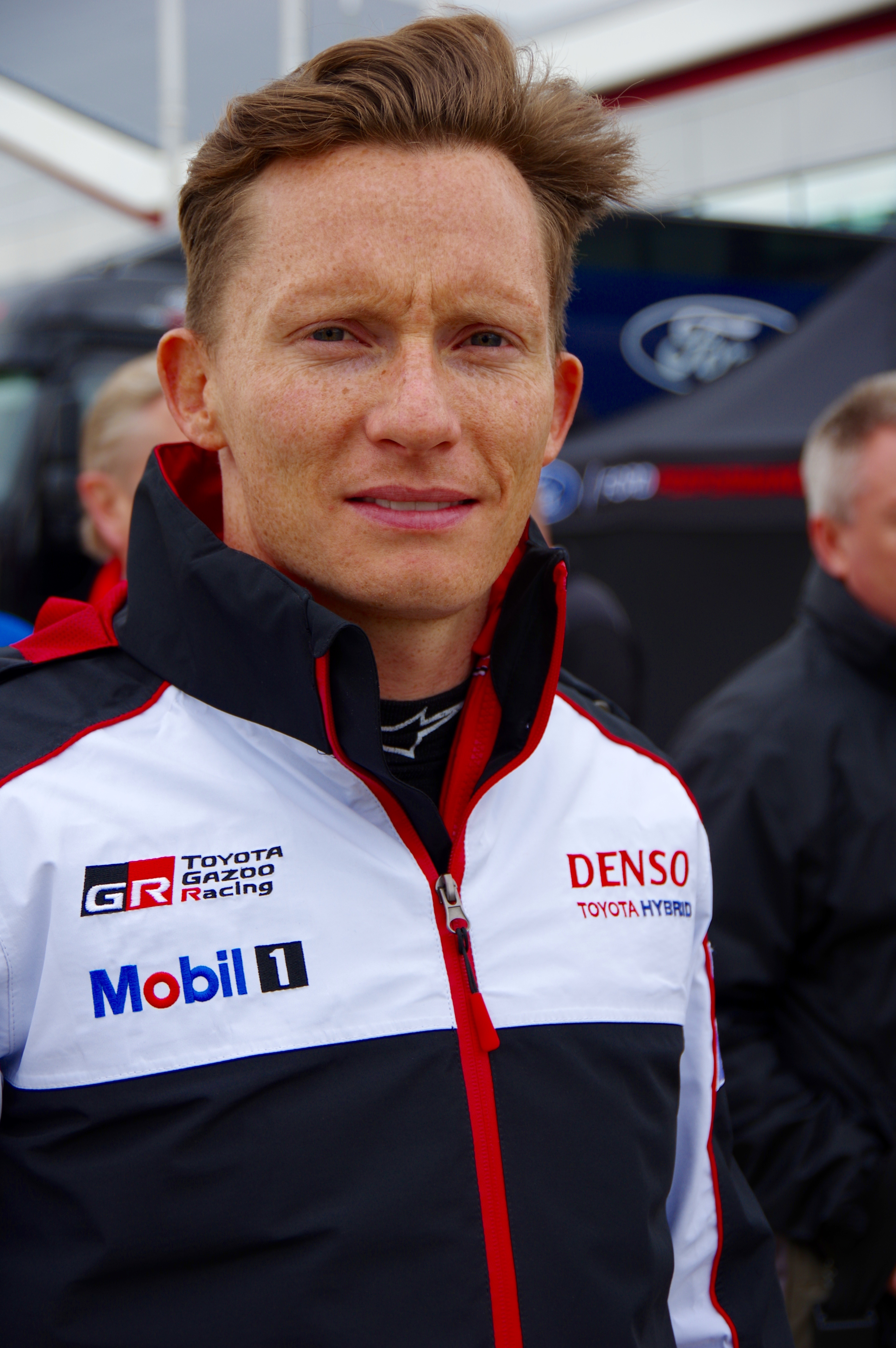
- Conway at the 2016 6 Hours of Silverstone
- Nationality: (United Kingdom) British
- Born: Michael Robert Conway; 19 August 1983 (age 43) Bromley, London, England

FIA World Endurance Championship career
- Debut season: 2013
- Current team: Toyota Gazoo Racing
- Categorisation: FIA Platinum
- Car number: 7
- Former teams: G-Drive Racing (2013)
- Starts: 94
- Wins: 24
- Poles: 24
- Fastest laps: 13
- Best finish: 1st in 2019–20, 2021

Previous series
- 2001 2001 2002 2003–04 2003 2005–06 2006–08 2009–2014: UK FFord Winter Series; UK Junior FFord; UK FFord Championship; Formula Renault UK; Formula Renault UK Winter Series; British F3 Championship; GP2 Series; IndyCar

Championship titles
- 2019–20, 2021 2006 2004: FIA World Endurance Championship; British Formula 3 Championship; Formula Renault UK

Awards
- 2006: National Driver of the Year

Michael Robert Conway (born 19 August 1983) is a British former racing driver who last competed in the FIA World Endurance Championship with Toyota Racing.

In endurance racing, Conway was a Toyota factory driver between 2014 and 2026. He won two FIA World Endurance Championship titles in 2019–20 and 2021, as well as the 24 Hours of Le Mans in 2021 and 2026. In formula racing, Conway was test driver for Honda in Formula One, won the Macau Grand Prix in 2006, and multiple IndyCar Series races between 2009 and 2014. He also briefly raced in Formula E.

== Early career ==
Conway who was born in Bromley, London, attended Sevenoaks Prep School from 1986 to 1996.

=== Karting to F3 ===
Conway began racing in karting at the age of eight at Rye House in Hertfordshire. After that, he went on to be the Formula A British Karting Champion, then raced in Formula Ford with Van Diemen. He was the Formula Renault UK Champion in 2004 and then entered the British F3 International Series in 2005, with the same Fortec Motorsport team with which he had competed in Formula Renault UK.

In British F3, Conway was the highest placed rookie and finished third behind Alvaro Parente and Charlie Kimball, as well as managing 13th in the BP Ultimate Masters at Zandvoort, having started 16th. At the Macau Grand Prix, Conway ended up fourth in both the qualifying and the qualifying race around the Circuito da Guia, before a problematic Grand Prix saw him retire with engine failure, but classified 14th.

Following that success, Conway was signed by 2MB Sports Management run by former Grand Prix drivers Martin Brundle and Mark Blundell, and signed for the Räikkönen Robertson Racing team, owned by then McLaren driver Kimi Räikkönen and his race-manager Steve Robertson. In the 2006 season, Conway dominated the British F3 International Series, and clinched the title with three races remaining, as well as finishing first of the British F3 drivers in Race Two of the prestigious Pau Grand Prix, in France, a round of the British F3 International Series for 2006 - Romain Grosjean won the race. While at the Macau Grand Prix, after qualifying 11th, he finished seventh in the qualifying race, before becoming the first British driver to win the Grand Prix since Darren Manning in 1999.

=== GP2 ===
==== 2006 ====
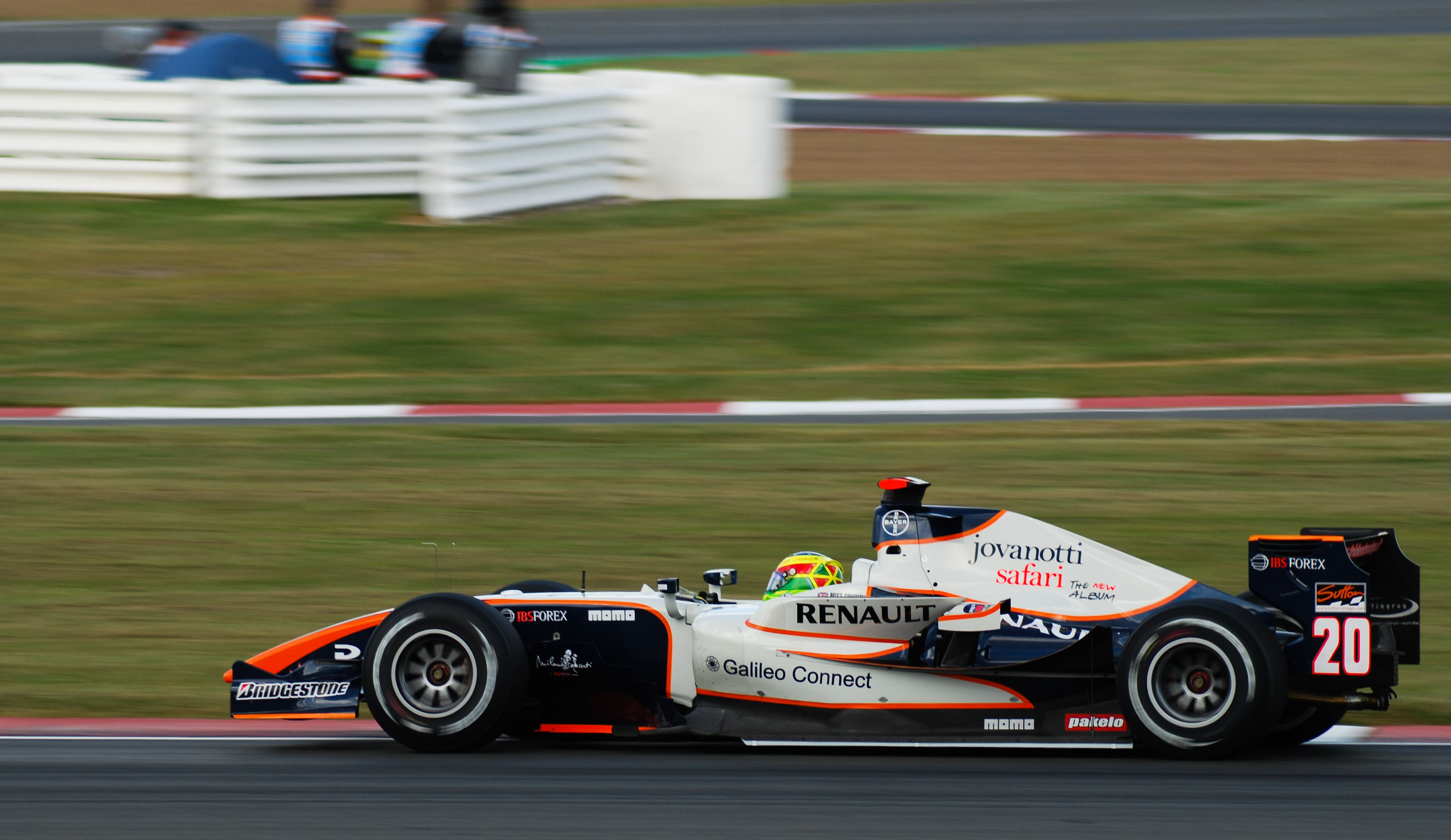
Conway driving for Trident Racing at the Silverstone round of the 2008 GP2 Series season

Conway made his GP2 debut at Silverstone in June 2006, when he replaced the injured Olivier Pla in a DPR Direxiv car. Having stalled at the start of race one, he battled to 11th place. In race two, he also finished 11th.

Conway won the National Racing Driver of the Year Award at the 2006 McLaren Autosport Awards.

==== 2007 ====
Conway then signed to drive a full season for Super Nova Racing in the 2007 GP2 Series, taking a podium finish at Silverstone, and signed as a test driver with the Honda Racing F1 Team . He remained in the series for 2008, having signed for the Trident Racing team, after testing for several other teams . At Monaco, he took his first GP2 series win (and first 2008 podium) in the sprint race, earning pole position by finishing eighth in the feature race, in which he ran third before being hit by backmarker Javier Villa on the final lap . At Magny-Cours, he finished eighth in the feature race, but faded to finish sixth in a wet sprint race. He eventually finished twelfth in the drivers' championship, an improvement of two positions on the previous year.

== IndyCar career ==
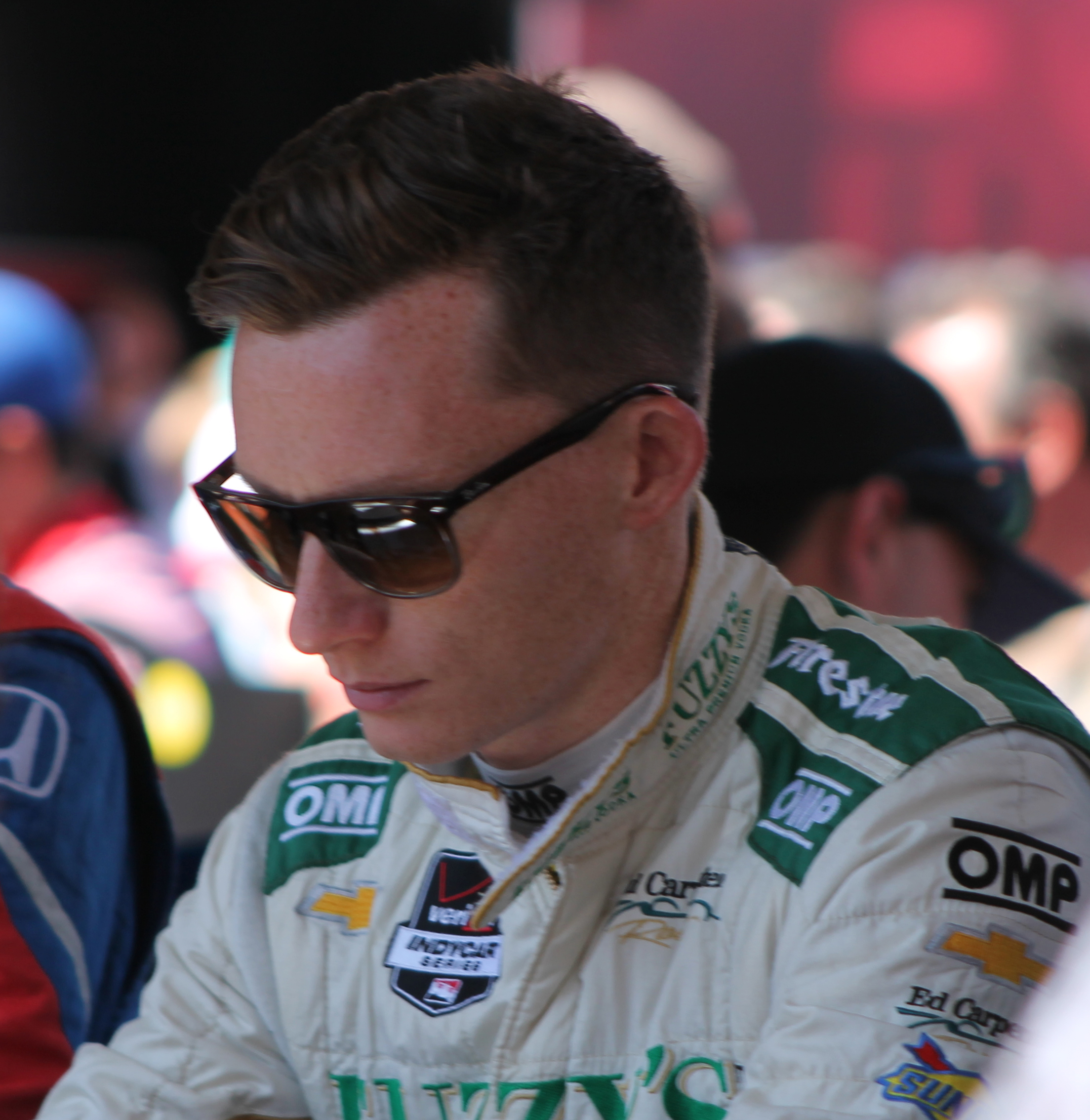
Conway at Sonoma Raceway in 2014

During 2008, Conway was given an opportunity to test an IndyCar Series car at Infineon Raceway and surprised several series regulars by being top of the times during one session. Conway signed with Dreyer & Reinbold Racing to compete in the IndyCar Series full-time in 2009.

On the final lap of the 2010 Indianapolis 500, Conway was battling side by side with Ryan Hunter-Reay when the two cars became entangled as Hunter-Reay's Dallara ran low on fuel and stuttered between turns 3 and 4, resulting in Conway's Dallara-Honda being launched into the air. Conway suffered a broken leg during the crash and was flown straight to the Methodist Hospital of Indianapolis. Conway also received a compression fracture of one of his thoracic vertebrae and was fitted with a back brace. The injuries effectively ended his participation in the rest of the season.

On 1 February 2011, Andretti Autosport announced that Conway had been signed to a full-time ride for the 2011 IndyCar season. He won his first IndyCar race at Long Beach on 17 April 2011, but the remainder of the year was disappointing, as Conway only managed to score three more top-ten finishes and failed to qualify for the Indianapolis 500; he finished 17th in the championship.

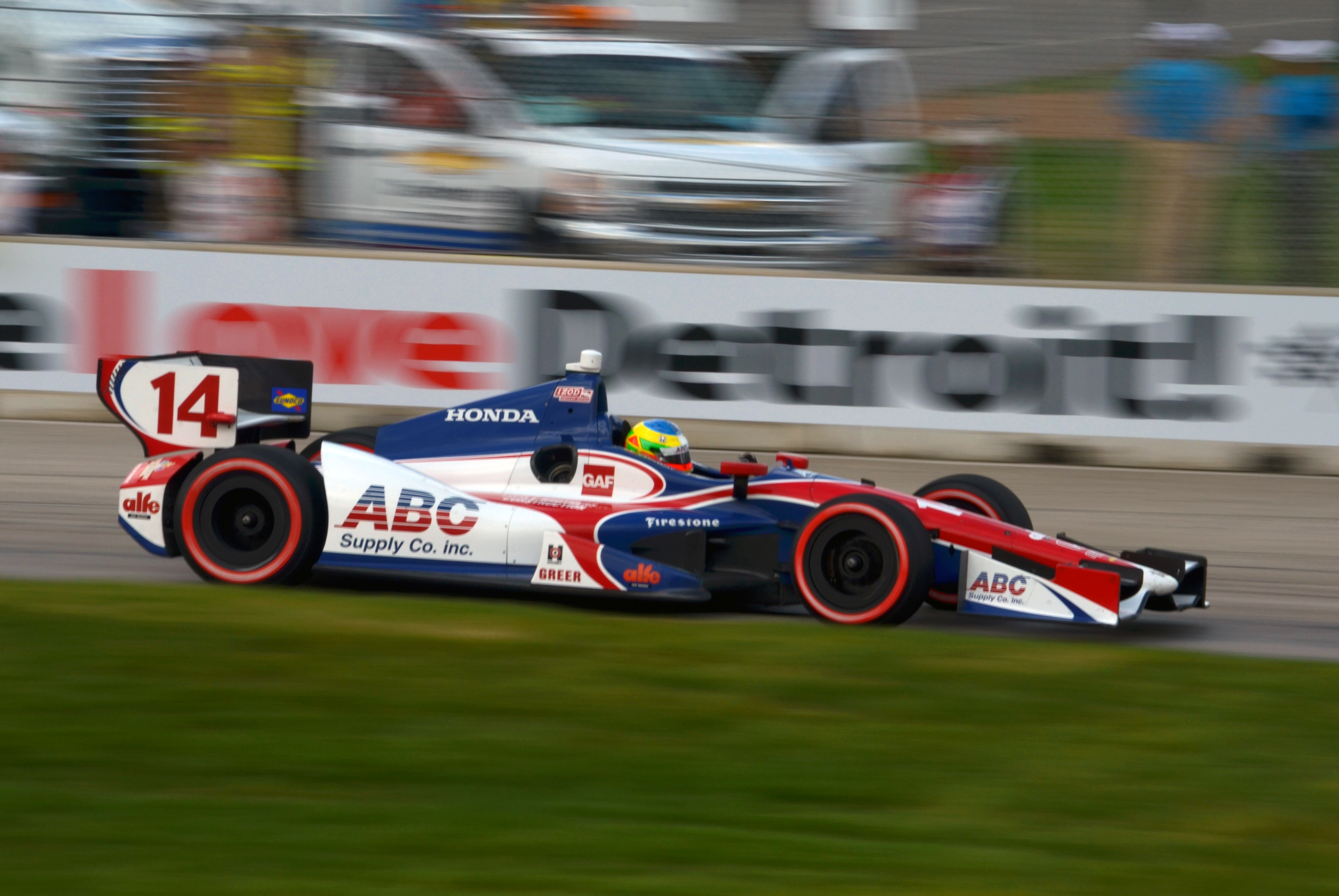
Conway driving in the 2012 Detroit Grand Prix

Conway moved to the A. J. Foyt Enterprises team for the 2012 season. He also made his racing return to the Indianapolis 500, having failed to qualify the year before. He qualified near the back but appeared to have a strong car coming up several positions during the race. On lap 79, Conway entered the pits during a scheduled green flag pit stop period. He made contact with one of his crew members damaging his front wing but not injuring the crew member. The damage went unnoticed by the crew who hurried up the pit stop to keep Conway in contention. A few laps later, Conway lost control of his car, spinning in front of Will Power and making contact with Power causing him to hit the inside wall. At the same time, Conway's car turned around backwards and flew airborne into the fence topside first. Conway was uninjured in the incident, but due to damage he was unable to finish the race and was scored in 29th position. He later finished in third place in Toronto, his best result of the season.

In the week leading up to the final race of the 2012 season—held at the Fontana superspeedway—Conway informed the Foyt team that he no longer felt comfortable competing on oval tracks, and asked not to race. He was replaced by Wade Cunningham. Conway's decision stemmed from injuries after a crash at the 2010 Indianapolis 500 and the debate over IndyCar competing on oval tracks after the October 2011 death of Dan Wheldon.

In 2013, Conway ran a one race deal with Rahal-Letterman-Lanigan Racing at Long Beach finishing 25th with an electrical issue, then signed with Dale Coyne Racing for the doubleheader events of the year, winning his first race out at the Belle Isle Park Course. In 2014, he ran only the road courses and street circuits for Ed Carpenter Racing winning both the Toyota Grand Prix of Long Beach as well as the Honda Indy Toronto Doubleheader.

== Sportscar career ==
=== 2013 ===
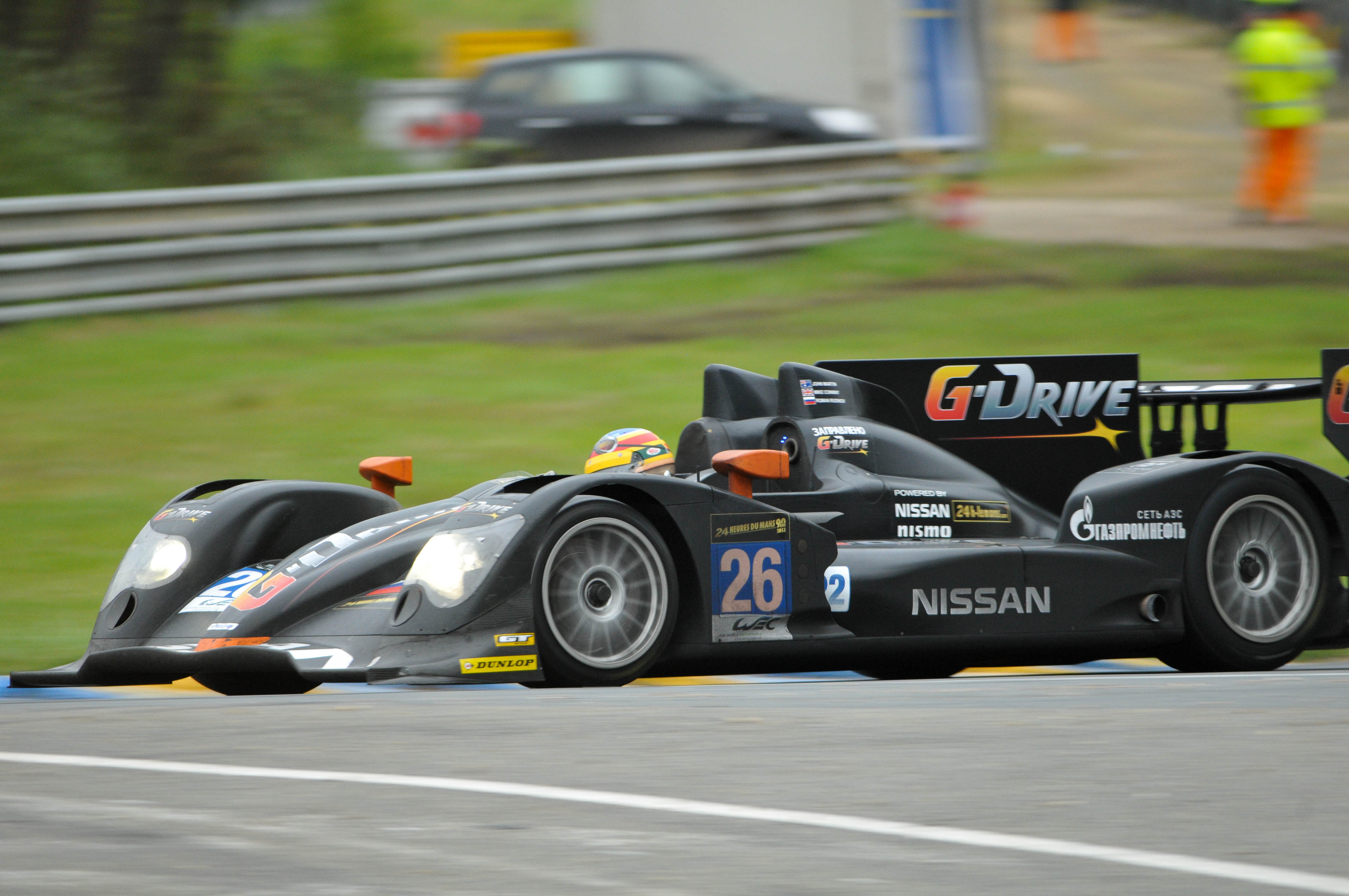
Conway driving the No. 26 Oreca 03 at the 2013 24 Hours of Le Mans, where they would be disqualified from the final classification

In 2013, Conway decided to enter sports car racing to supplement his IndyCar career, becoming a full-time driver for G-Drive Racing in the LMP2 class of the FIA World Endurance Championship. Having started the campaign with two points finishes, Conway and co-drivers John Martin and Roman Rusinov were excluded from a third place at Le Mans due to a fuel tank infraction. They then found form, dominantly winning from pole at São Paulo and Austin. After finishing second in Japan, the trio won the final two races to finish third in the category standings.

=== 2014 ===
The following year, Conway joined LMP1 outfit Toyota Gazoo Racing as a test and reserve driver in the WEC, driving for the team in three races besides his IndyCar commitments. He would score his first overall win in sportscars at Bahrain, beating the Porsche entries on pace during the middle of the contest. In addition to his duties in sportscars and IndyCar, Conway was announced as one of Dragon Racing's drivers for the inaugural Formula E season in July, though he left the team on 5 September before the first round.

=== 2015–2016 ===
Conway would become a full-time driver at Toyota for the 2015 season, racing with the experienced pairing of Stéphane Sarrazin and Alexander Wurz. Over the course of the year, Toyota was unable to keep up with its rivals, as Conway and his teammates finished sixth in the standings, level on points with the sister car. With the retirement of Wurz, Conway and Sarrazin were joined by Kamui Kobayashi ahead of 2016. After being promoted to second at Silverstone due to a disqualification for Audi, Conway made a mistake at Spa, hitting the No. 37 LMP2 entry and being forced to serve a drive-through penalty. The car was later retired due to an engine failure. Conway began the Le Mans 24 Hours well by overtaking the Porsches of Timo Bernhard and Neel Jani to take the lead in the opening hour. He lost the lead to Jani during the night but emerged ahead due to a superior strategy in the morning; a chance of victory went begging however when the No. 6 had to enter the garage to fix floor damage, thus losing a place to the No. 2 Porsche and eventually ending up second after the No. 5's retirement on the final lap. From the middle part of the campaign the No. 6 would become a constant on the podium, finishing third in Mexico and America before winning its home race at Fuji after a strong performance by Kobayashi. The trio finished second in Shanghai despite suffering two punctures but lost out on the title in the final round, eventually finishing third overall.

=== 2017 ===
In 2017, Conway's teammates changed again, as he and Kobayashi were now partnering José María López in the No. 7. An early lead battle at the season opener was ended when López crashed heavily, though the team bounced back to claim second at Spa. Drama followed at Le Mans: Conway had re-taken a lead he had lost during the second hour, which later became substantial because of reliability struggles for the entire LMP1 field. The No. 7 would not be spared however, as the car's clutch broke during the night and forced them to retire. Over the rest of the campaign, Conway and his teammates only scored two more podiums and finished last of the four full-time LMP1 entries in the standings.

=== 2018–19 ===
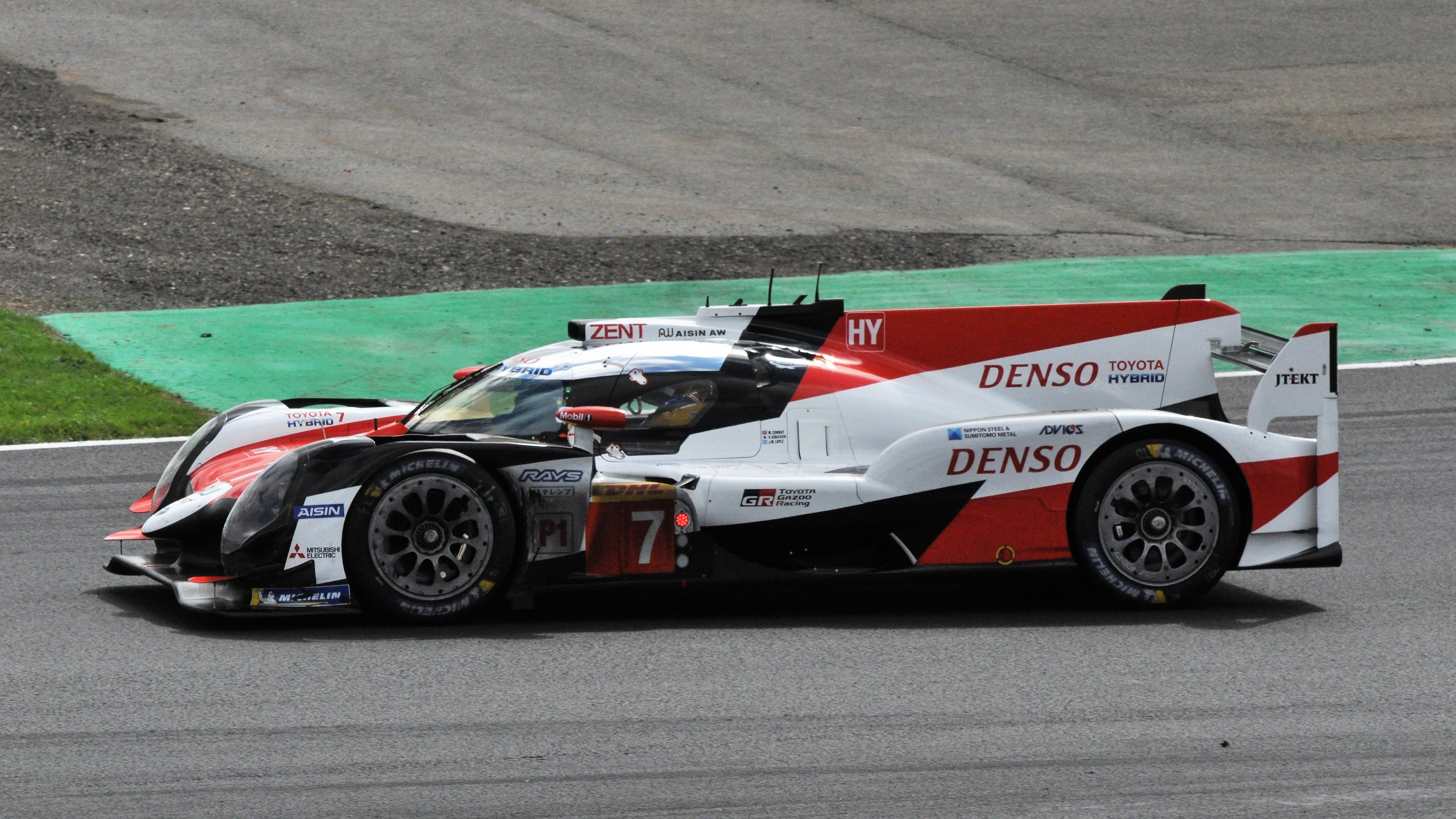
Conway driving in the 2018 6 Hours of Silverstone

With the absence of any manufacturers outside of Toyota in the top class for the 2018–19 season, Conway, Kobayashi, and López would be battling the sister car throughout the year. Their dominance showed at round one, where Conway made his way through all other classes within the first hour despite starting from the back of the grid and later narrowly lost out on victory to Fernando Alonso in the No. 8. The No. 7 finished second to the sister car at Le Mans and once again lost out at Silverstone despite a pole from Conway and López, though both cars would be disqualified post-race. Fuji proved to be a standout race for Conway, who took the lead from teammate Sébastien Buemi in the pits at the halfway mark and extended it to almost fifteen seconds, resulting in his first win of the year. Another victory followed at Shanghai, where Conway held on to first place in spite of the pressure created by the quicker Kazuki Nakajima in the closing laps. However, this would be the last win for the No. 7 that season, as they were held back by a collision with a GT entry at Sebring and issues at Spa, where a qualifying lap record by Conway and Kobayashi was undone by a sensor failure which lost them the chance of a podium. A win at the 2019 Le Mans race was scuppered within the final hour, as the outfit suffered a puncture which put them behind the sister car. Regardless of the Le Mans outcome, the No. 7 came second in the standings, 41 points behind the #8.

=== 2019–20 ===
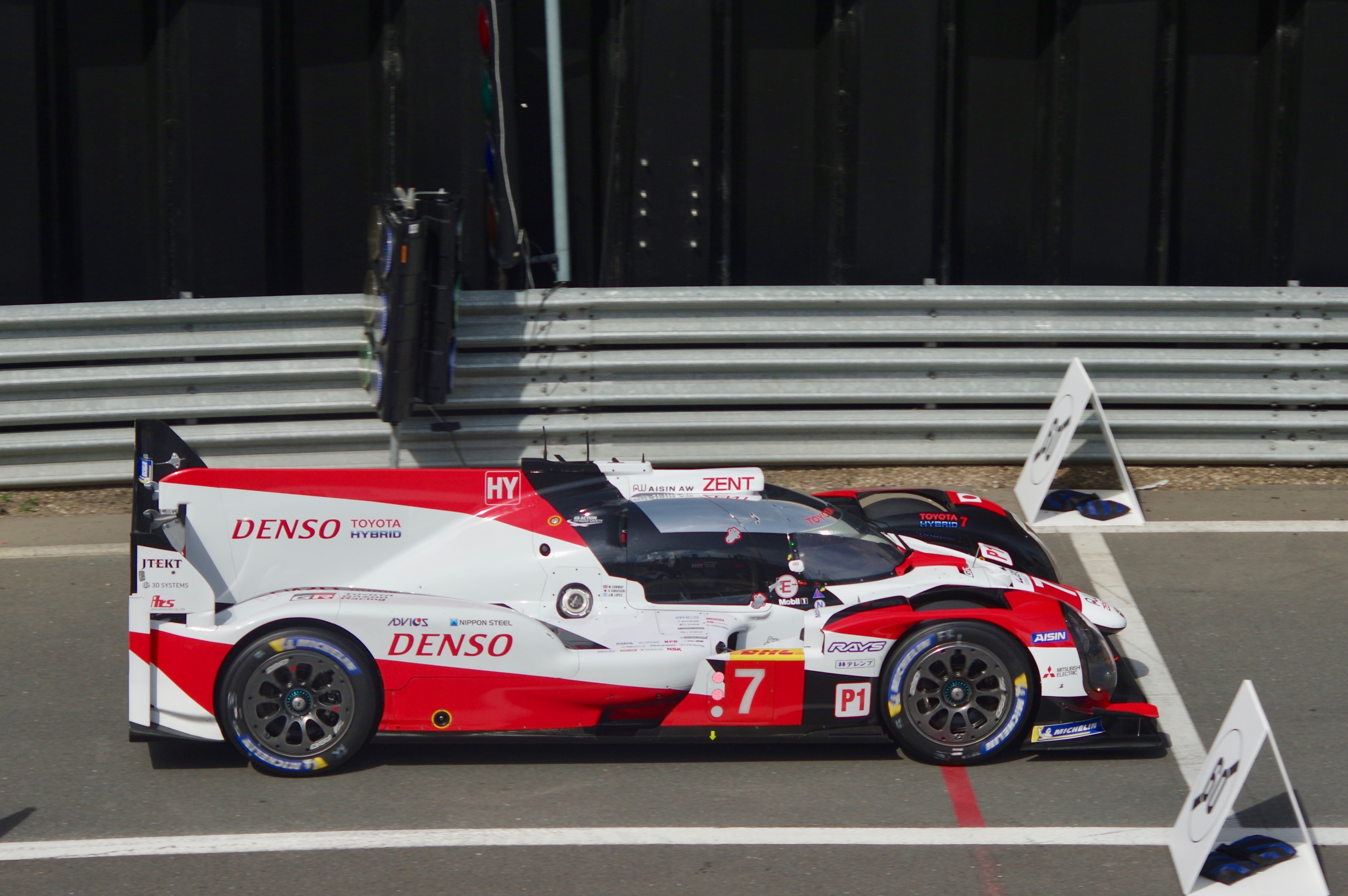
The race-winning No. 7 car in Silverstone

For the fifth full season in succession, Conway returned to Toyota in 2019–20. The final season of LMP1 regulations began well, as Conway and Kobayashi combined for pole at Silverstone before winning the race along with López. A second place at Fuji and third place to the sister car and the winning Rebellion Racing entry in China preceded the team's second victory at the 2019 8 Hours of Bahrain, where Conway was able to avoid the first lap chaos to establish an early advantage. The No. 7 would retain the championship, as they followed a third place in the United States with a commanding win at Spa after the COVID-induced break. However, they once again lost out on a Le Mans victory by finishing second to the sister crew; they lost the lead this time thanks to a loss of power caused by a fracture in an exhaust manifold during the early hours of Sunday. Consolation would come at the final round in Bahrain, where a pole position from Conway and López led to a victory and, eventually, the WEC title.

=== 2021 ===
In 2021, the new Le Mans Hypercar formula would be introduced, forcing Conway and his teammates to pilot the new Toyota GR010 Hybrid in the WEC. Having experienced a troubled run at Spa which relegated the No. 7 to third behind the grandfathered LMP1 of Alpine and finished second at Portimão, the trio drove an untroubled Monza race and won following a short battle with the Alpine. At Le Mans, Kobayashi qualified the car on pole. Conway then went on to take a dominant lead after the #8 suffered a crash on the first safety car restart; the No. 7 team experienced few troubles and won, giving Conway, Kobayashi, and López their first respective victories at the 24 Hours. The championship lead they had gained would be solidified at the first Bahrain event where the #7 outpaced the #8 to win for the third time running. Despite losing first place to the sister car at the season finale, Conway and his teammates ended up retaining the World Championship with a second-place finish, therefore becoming the first titlists in the Hypercar era.

=== 2022 ===
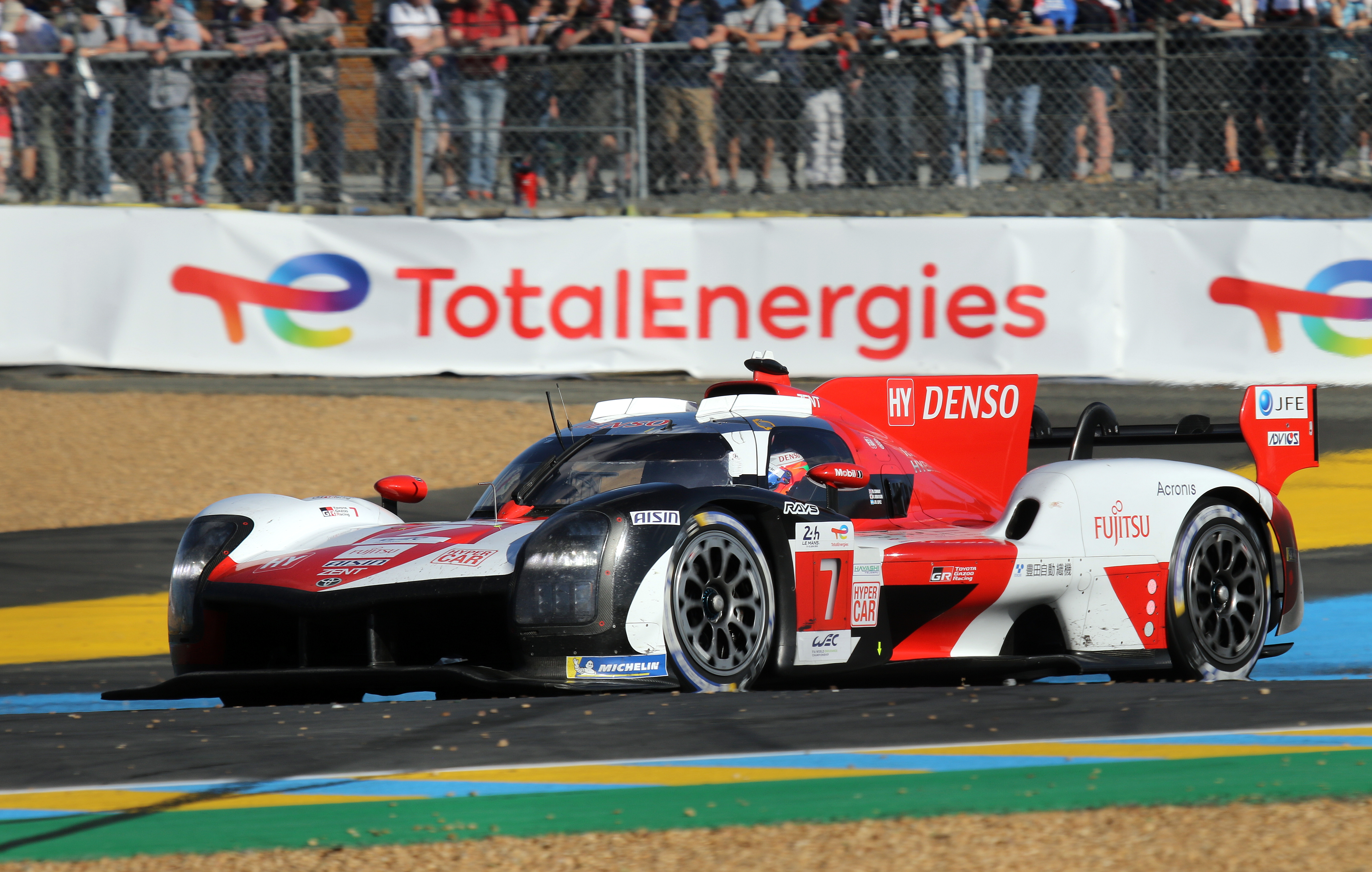
Conway piloting the No. 7 GR010 Hybrid at the 2022 24 Hours of Le Mans

The 2022 season proved to be more difficult: the team suffered a heavy crash at Sebring at the hands of López, though they bounced back to win at Spa amidst race-ending issues for the No. 8. Conway had multiple fights for the lead with Buemi at Le Mans, but the team was forced to settle for second after encountering a front-axle motor–generator issue during the morning hours. The No. 7 then finished third at Monza, where a fight with the Alpine resulted in a collision, a penalty for Kobayashi, and a third-place finish. Despite Kobayashi's pole at Fuji the team was unable to keep up with the sister car and came second; Conway and his teammates finished the season on a positive note by winning in Bahrain, where Conway's pace allowed the team to issue orders to Brendon Hartley to let the Brit past. The No. 7's drivers finished third in the overall table, sixteen points behind their teammates.

=== 2023 ===
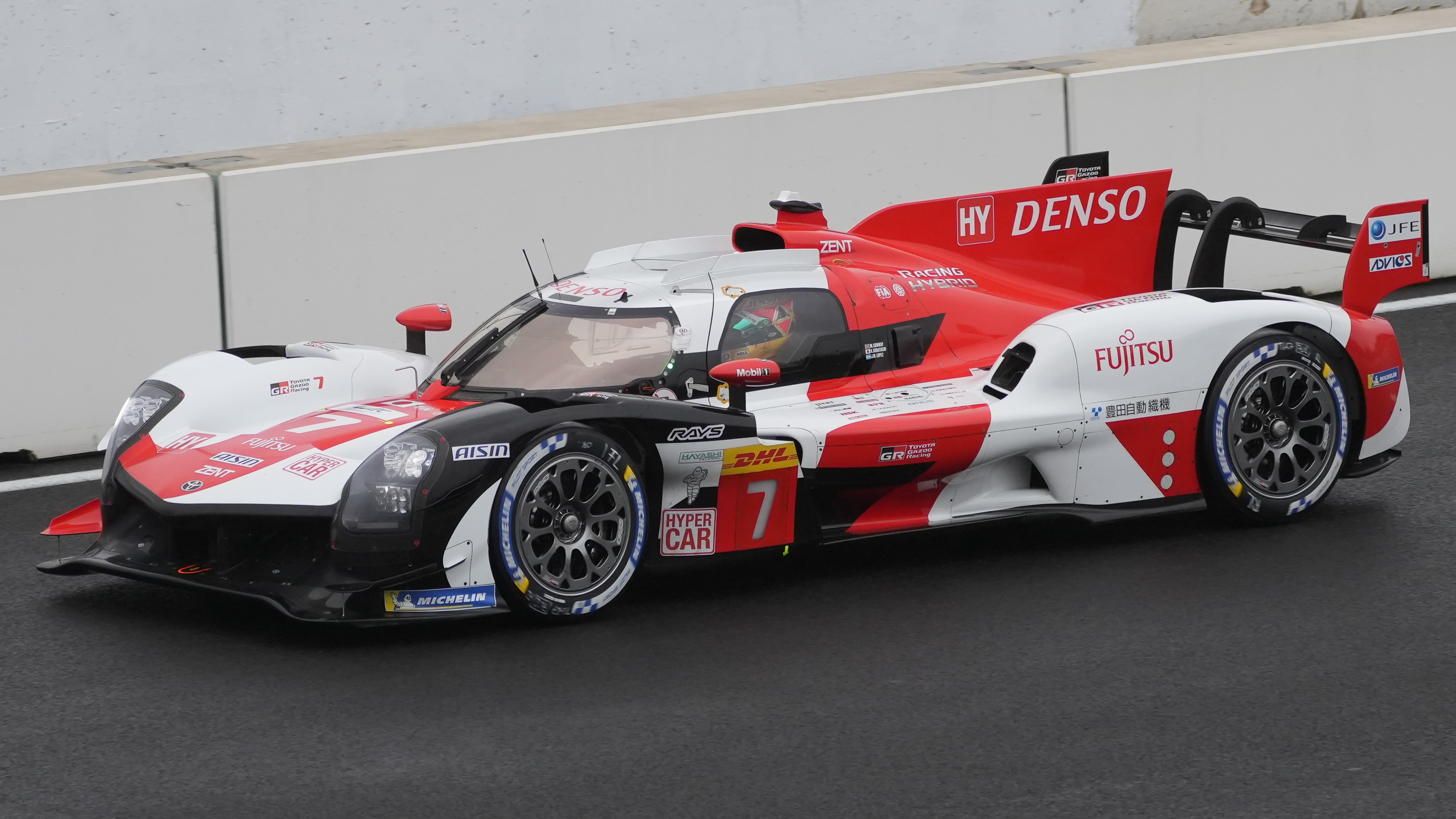
Conway and his No. 7 teammates took victory in Spa-Francorchamps

With an influx of new manufacturers, 2023 would bring stronger opposition for Toyota. Still, the team managed to start well, as Conway and the No. 7 won the opening round in Sebring. Portimão however brought problems, with a failure of a torque sensor necessitating a swap of the left-side driveshaft and resulting in ninth place at the flag. A victory at Spa was followed up by a retirement at Le Mans, where Kobayashi had to retire at midnight following a crash caused by an LMP2 car. Despite the virtual impossibility of winning the title at that point, the #7 crew persevered, coming out on top in a lead battle with the No. 50 Ferrari at Monza. They also triumphed at Fuji, once again winning from pole but this time after a long chase of the No. 6 Porsche. A runner-up spot at Bahrain was enough for Conway and his teammates to finish second, though they lost out on both the race win and the championship to the No. 8.

=== 2024 ===
Toyota made a change to its driver lineup for the 2024 campaign: López left the team, with Conway and Kobayashi now partnering former reserve driver Nyck de Vries. However, Conway would be forced to miss Le Mans after he fractured his ribs and collarbone in a cycling accident a day before the race. José María López replaced Conway for the Le Mans weekend. Conway returned at São Paulo and controlled the race's early stages, before dropping off the lead lap with a fuel pressure monitor problem. They eventually recovered to fourth by the flag. The team then finished second at Lone Star Le Mans, battling for the race lead against the No. 83 AF Corse car throughout but losing out due to a drive-through penalty for Kobayashi. Following the race, Conway described the penalty as "bizarre". The season ended discretely: at Fuji, a collision between Kobayashi and Matt Campbell forced Toyota out of the race. Though Conway went up to third in the opening hour of the Bahrain season finale, the No. 7 retired from the lead in hour 5 with a fuel pump issue.

=== 2025 ===
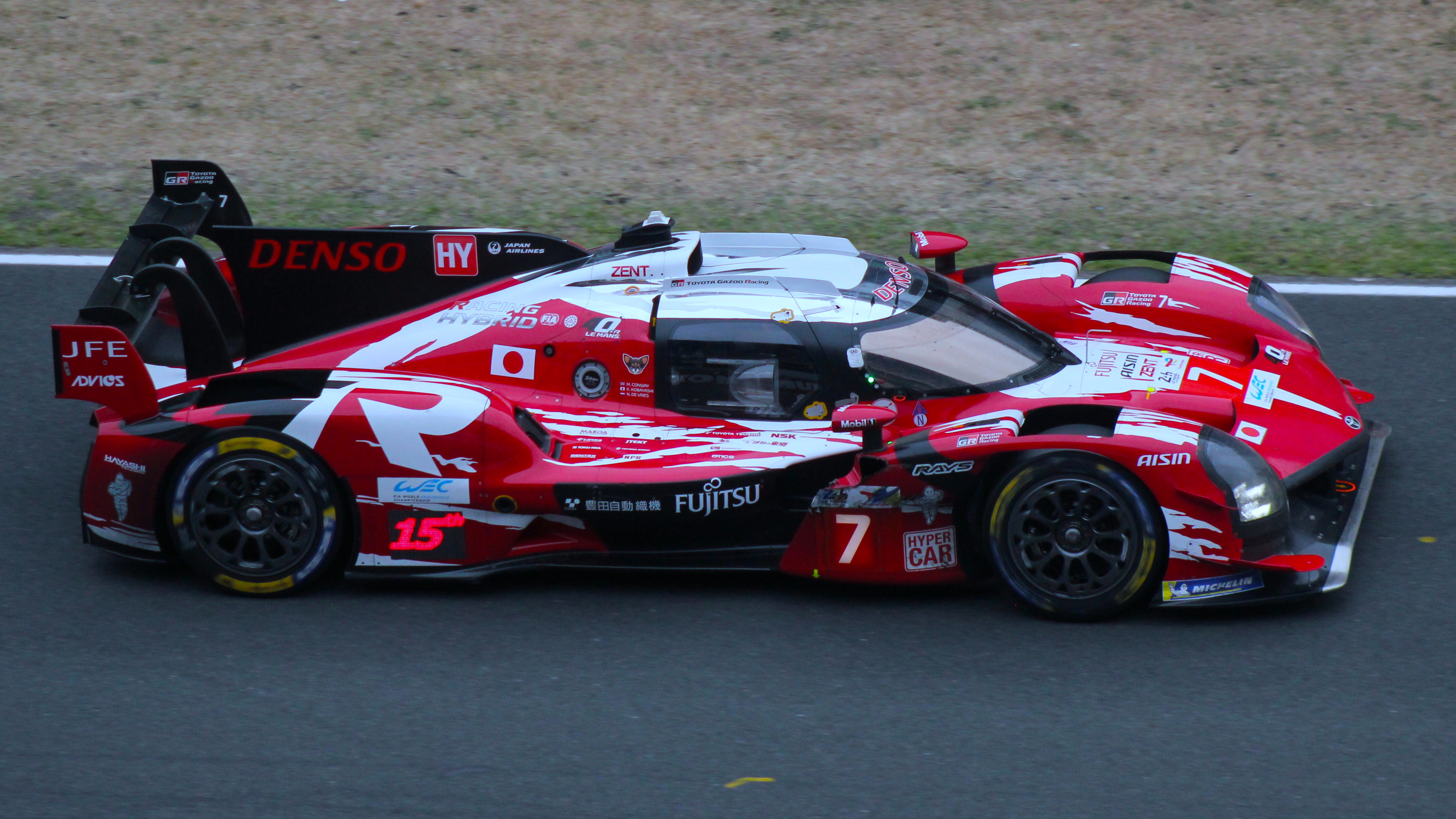
Conway's No. 7 car at the 2025 24 Hours of Le Mans

Conway and his teammates remained unchanged in 2025. Sixth in Qatar was followed by seventh in Imola, where Conway damaged the car after a collision with René Rast. At Spa, Conway recovered to sixth during the first hour after suffering a puncture; the team eventually finished seventh. Conway and his teammates then ended up sixth at Le Mans, being the last car on the lead lap, before being promoted to fifth following a penalty to Ferrari's No. 50. A slump in performance followed at São Paulo, where both Toyotas finished outside of the points. After suffering a collar bone injury in another bike crash, Conway was ruled out of the Lone Star Le Mans weekend, once again being replaced by former teammate López. Having tempered expectations for the teams performance ahead of his return in Fuji, Conway finished the race in eighth. At the final round in Bahrain, Conway held the lead for the majority of the first two hours, paving the way for a comfortable victory for the No. 7 crew.

=== 2026 ===
In 2026, Conway remained with Toyota, driving the updated TR010 chassis. The No. 7 team finished third at the season opener in Imola before claiming fifth at Spa. At Le Mans, Conway and his teammates claimed victory ahead of the No. 20 BMW, making it the second time Conway and Kobayashi had won the 24 Hours. The team lost the championship lead by finishing 12th at São Paulo, before a late technical issue denied the No. 7 crew the win at Austin. Despite a drive-through penalty suffered by Kobayashi, the team finished eighth at Fuji, thus retaining second in the standings. Ahead of the final two rounds of the season, Conway announced his retirement from racing following the conclusion of the 2026 season.

== Racing record ==
=== Career summary ===
Season	Series	Team	Races	Wins	Poles	F/laps	Podiums	Points	Position
2001	British Junior Formula Ford Championship	Martin Donnelly Racing	?	1	0	?	2	150	6th
2002	British Formula Ford Championship	Duckhams Racing with Van Diemen	18	0	0	3	6	319	4th
2003	Formula Renault UK	Fortec Motorsport	17	1	1	4	5	312	4th
2003	Formula Renault UK Winter Series	Fortec Motorsport	3	1	1	1	2	29	8th
2003	Formula Renault 2000 Masters	Fortec Motorsport	1	0	0	0	0	0	NC
2004	Formula Renault UK	Fortec Motorsport	18	8	9	11	16	518	**1st**
2004	Formula Renault 2000 Eurocup	Fortec Motorsport	2	1	0	0	1	0	NC†
2005	British Formula 3 International Series	Fortec Motorsport	22	1	0	1	7	192	**3rd**
2005	Masters of Formula 3	Fortec Motorsport	1	0	0	0	0	N/A	13th
2005	Macau Grand Prix	Manor Motorsport	1	0	0	0	0	N/A	14th
2006	British Formula 3 International Series	Räikkönen Robertson Racing	20	8	8	3	17	311	**1st**
2006	Masters of Formula 3	Räikkönen Robertson Racing	1	0	0	0	0	N/A	36th
2006	Macau Grand Prix	Räikkönen Robertson Racing	1	0	0	0	0	N/A	**1st**
2006	GP2 Series	DPR Direxiv	2	0	0	0	0	0	29th
2007	GP2 Series	Super Nova Racing	21	0	0	1	1	19	14th
2007	Formula One	Honda Racing F1 Team	Test driver						
2008	GP2 Series	Trident Racing	20	1	0	1	1	20	12th
2008	Formula One	Honda Racing F1 Team	Test driver						
2009	IndyCar Series	Dreyer & Reinbold Racing	17	0	0	1	1	261	17th
2010	IndyCar Series	Dreyer & Reinbold Racing	6	0	0	0	0	110	25th
2011	IndyCar Series	Andretti Autosport	17	1	0	0	1	260	17th
2012	IndyCar Series	A. J. Foyt Enterprises	14	0	0	0	1	233	21st
2012	International V8 Supercars Championship	Lucas Dumbrell Motorsport	2	0	0	0	0	0	NC†
2013	IndyCar Series	Rahal Letterman Lanigan Racing	1	0	0	0	0	185	23rd
2013	IndyCar Series	Dale Coyne Racing	6	1	1	2	2	185	23rd
2013	FIA World Endurance Championship - LMP2	G-Drive Racing	8	4	3	4	5	132	**3rd**
2013	24 Hours of Le Mans - LMP2	G-Drive Racing	1	0	0	0	0	N/A	EX
2014	IndyCar Series	Ed Carpenter Racing	12	2	0	0	2	252	23rd
2014	FIA World Endurance Championship	Toyota Racing	3	1	0	0	1	45	11th
2015	FIA World Endurance Championship	Toyota Racing	8	0	0	0	1	79	6th
2015	24 Hours of Le Mans	Toyota Racing	1	0	0	0	0	N/A	6th
2015–16	Formula E	Venturi GP	7	0	0	0	0	7	16th
2016	FIA World Endurance Championship	Toyota Gazoo Racing	9	1	0	0	6	145	**3rd**
2016	24 Hours of Le Mans	Toyota Gazoo Racing	1	0	0	0	1	N/A	**2nd**
2016	European Le Mans Series - LMP2	Thiriet by TDS Racing	1	1	1	1	1	26	14th
2016–17	Formula E	Faraday Future Dragon Racing	1	0	0	0	0	0	24th
2017	FIA World Endurance Championship	Toyota Gazoo Racing	9	0	4	1	3	103.5	5th
2017	24 Hours of Le Mans	Toyota Gazoo Racing	1	0	1	0	0	N/A	DNF
2017	IMSA SportsCar Championship - Prototype	Whelen Engineering Racing	3	0	0	1	2	88	18th
2018	IMSA SportsCar Championship - Prototype	Whelen Engineering Racing	3	0	0	1	2	86	25th
2018	24 Hours of Le Mans	Toyota Gazoo Racing	1	0	0	0	1	N/A	**2nd**
2018–19	FIA World Endurance Championship	Toyota Gazoo Racing	8	2	4	3	6	157	**2nd**
2019	IMSA SportsCar Championship - DPi	Mustang Sampling Racing	2	0	0	0	0	49	24th
2019	24 Hours of Le Mans	Toyota Gazoo Racing	1	0	1	1	1	N/A	**2nd**
2019–20	FIA World Endurance Championship	Toyota Gazoo Racing	8	4	3	1	8	207	**1st**
2020	IMSA SportsCar Championship - DPi	Whelen Engineering Racing	1	0	0	0	0	24	26th
2020	24 Hours of Le Mans	Toyota Gazoo Racing	1	0	1	0	1	N/A	**3rd**
2021	FIA World Endurance Championship - Hypercar	Toyota Gazoo Racing	6	3	4	2	6	173	**1st**
2021	24 Hours of Le Mans - Hypercar	Toyota Gazoo Racing	1	1	1	0	1	N/A	**1st**
2021	IMSA SportsCar Championship - DPi	Whelen Engineering Racing	4	0	3	2	1	1231	11th
2022	FIA World Endurance Championship - Hypercar	Toyota Gazoo Racing	6	2	1	0	5	133	**3rd**
2022	24 Hours of Le Mans - Hypercar	Toyota Gazoo Racing	1	0	0	1	1	N/A	**2nd**
2022	IMSA SportsCar Championship - DPi	Whelen Engineering Racing	4	0	0	1	2	1266	10th
2023	FIA World Endurance Championship - Hypercar	Toyota Gazoo Racing	7	4	3	1	5	145	**2nd**
2023	24 Hours of Le Mans - Hypercar	Toyota Gazoo Racing	1	0	0	0	0	N/A	DNF
2023	IMSA SportsCar Championship - GTD Pro	Vasser Sullivan Racing	1	0	0	0	1	330	23rd
2024	FIA World Endurance Championship - Hypercar	Toyota Gazoo Racing	7	1	1	1	2	77	6th
2024	IMSA SportsCar Championship - GTD Pro	Vasser Sullivan	1	0	0	0	0	232	41st
2025	FIA World Endurance Championship - Hypercar	Toyota Gazoo Racing	7	1	1	0	1	89	6th
2025	24 Hours of Le Mans - Hypercar	Toyota Gazoo Racing	1	0	0	0	0	N/A	6th
2026	FIA World Endurance Championship - Hypercar	Toyota Racing	8	1	0	0	3	97	**2nd**

† – As Conway was a guest driver, he was ineligible to score points.

=== Complete British Formula Ford Championship results ===
(key) (Races in bold indicate pole position) (Races in italics indicate fastest lap)

Year	Entrant	Chassis	1	2	3	4	5	6	7	8	9	10	11	12	13	14	15	16	17	18	DC	Points
2002	Duckhams Racing with Van Diemen	Van Diemen RF02	BHGP; 3	OUL; 1; 3	OUL; 2 Ret	THR; 1; 2	THR; 2; 2	SIL; 1 Ret	SIL; 2; 6	MON; 1; 3	MON; 2; 4	CRO; 1; 4	CRO; 2; 4	SNE; 1; 5	SNE; 2 Ret	KNO; 1; 4	KNO; 2 Ret	BHI; 3	DON; 1; 5	DON; 2; 7	4th	319

=== Complete Formula Renault 2.0 UK Championship results ===
(key) (Races in bold indicate pole position) (Races in italics indicate fastest lap)

Year	Entrant	1	2	3	4	5	6	7	8	9	10	11	12	13	14	15	16	17	18	19	20	DC	Points
2003	Fortec Motorsport	SNE; 1; 1	**SNE**; **2**; 2	BRH; 3	THR; 4	SIL; 11	ROC; 8	CRO; 1; 7	CRO; 2; 7	DON; 1; 11	DON; 2; 5	SNE; 23	BRH; 1; 5	BRH; 2; 5	DON; 1; 6	DON; 2; 23	OUL; 1; 2	OUL; 2; 3				4th	312
2004	Fortec Motorsport	**THR**; **1**; 1	**THR**; **2**; 1	BRH; 1; 4	**BRH**; **2**; 2	SIL; 1; 3	**SIL**; **2**; 1	OUL; 1; 2	**OUL**; **2**; 2	THR; 1; 2	THR; 2; 1	**CRO**; **1**; 1	**CRO**; **2**; 1	KNO; 1; 2	KNO; 2; 4	BRH; 1; 3	BRH; 2; 2	**SNE**; **1**; 1	**SNE**; **2**; 1	DON; 1	DON; 2	1st	518

=== Complete British Formula Three Championship results ===
(key) (Races in bold indicate pole position) (Races in italics indicate fastest lap)

Year	Entrant	Chassis	Engine	1	2	3	4	5	6	7	8	9	10	11	12	13	14	15	16	17	18	19	20	21	22	23	24	DC	Points
2005	Fortec Motorsport	Dallara F305	Opel	DON; 1; 2	DON; 2; 3	SPA; 1 C	SPA; 2 C	CRO; 1; 1	CRO; 2; 14	KNO; 1; 3	KNO; 2 Ret	THR; 1; 4	THR; 2; 5	CAS; 1; 6	CAS; 2; 7	MNZ; 1; 4	MNZ; 2; 4	MNZ; 3; 21	SIL; 1; 6	SIL; 2; 3	SIL; 3 Ret	NÜR; 1; 2	NÜR; 2; 4	MON; 1; 2	MON; 2; 5	SIL; 1; 5	SIL; 2; 4	3rd	192
2006	Räikkönen Robertson Racing	Dallara F306	Mercedes HWA	OUL; 1; 5	**OUL**; **2**; 3	**DON**; **1**; 7	**DON**; **2**; 1	**PAU**; **1**; 2	**PAU**; **2**; 3	MON; 1; 2	MON; 2; 3	**SNE**; **1**; 1	SNE; 2; 1	SPA; 1; 4	SPA; 2; 2	SIL; 1; 1	**SIL**; **2**; 1	**BRH**; **1**; 1	BRH; 2; 3	MUG; 1; 6	MUG; 2; 3	**SIL**; **1**; 1	**SIL**; **2**; 1	THR; 1 Ret	THR; 2; 4			1st	321

=== Complete GP2 Series results ===
(key) (Races in bold indicate pole position) (Races in italics indicate fastest lap)

Year	Entrant	1	2	3	4	5	6	7	8	9	10	11	12	13	14	15	16	17	18	19	20	21	DC	Points
2006	DPR Direxiv	VAL; FEA	VAL; SPR	IMO; FEA	IMO; SPR	NÜR; FEA	NÜR; SPR	CAT; FEA	CAT; SPR	MON; FEA	SIL; FEA; 11	SIL; SPR; 11	MAG; FEA	MAG; SPR	HOC; FEA	HOC; SPR	HUN; FEA	HUN; SPR	IST; FEA	IST; SPR	MNZ; FEA	MNZ; SPR	29th	0
2007	Super Nova International	BHR; FEA; Ret	BHR; SPR; 5	CAT; FEA; Ret	CAT; SPR; 12	MON; FEA; Ret	MAG; FEA; 9	MAG; SPR; Ret	SIL; FEA; 2	SIL; SPR; 5	NÜR; FEA; 18	NÜR; SPR; 15	HUN; FEA; Ret	HUN; SPR; 8	IST; FEA; Ret	IST; SPR; Ret	MNZ; FEA; Ret	MNZ; SPR; 9	SPA; FEA; 5	SPA; SPR; 5	VAL; FEA; 16	VAL; SPR; 9	14th	19
2008	Trident Racing	CAT; FEA; Ret	CAT; SPR; 8	IST; FEA; 9	IST; SPR; 5	MON; FEA; 8	MON; SPR; 1	MAG; FEA; 8	MAG; SPR; 6	SIL; FEA; 14	SIL; SPR; 4	HOC; FEA; Ret	HOC; SPR; 9	HUN; FEA; 6	HUN; SPR; 11	VAL; FEA; Ret	VAL; SPR; 8	SPA; FEA; 7	SPA; SPR; Ret	MNZ; FEA; 13	MNZ; SPR; Ret		12th	20

=== Complete IndyCar Series results ===
(key) (Races in bold indicate pole position. Races in italics indicate fastest lap)

Year	Team	No.	Chassis	Engine	1	2	3	4	5	6	7	8	9	10	11	12	13	14	15	16	17	18	19	Rank	Points	Ref
2009	Dreyer & Reinbold Racing	24	Dallara	Honda	STP; 22	LBH; 21	KAN; 19	INDY; 18	MIL; 20	TXS; 19	IOW; 8	RIR; 18	WGL; 6	TOR; 22	EDM; 20	KTY; 17	MDO; 20	SNM; 3	CHI; 16	MOT; 22	HMS; 15			17th	261	
2010	Dreyer & Reinbold Racing	24	Dallara	Honda	SAO; 8	STP; 19	ALA; 9	LBH; 10	KAN; 14	INDY; 19	TXS	IOW	WGL	TOR	EDM	MDO	SNM	CHI	KTY	MOT	HMS			25th	110	
2011	Andretti Autosport	27	Dallara	Honda	STP; 23	ALA; 22	LBH; 1	SAO; 6	INDY; DNQ	TXS; 24	TXS; 17	MIL; 12	IOW; 24	TOR; 22	EDM; 8	MDO; 26	NHM; 25	SNM; 16	BAL; 23	MOT; 9	KTY; 18	LVS^{1} C		17th	260	
2012	A. J. Foyt Enterprises	14	Dallara DW12	Honda	STP; 20	ALA; 7	LBH; 22	SAO; 19	INDY; 29	DET; 9	TXS; 16	MIL; 16	IOW; 20	TOR; 3	EDM; 11	MDO; 21	SNM; 14	BAL; 16	FON					21st	233	
2013	Rahal Letterman Lanigan Racing	17	Dallara DW12	Honda	STP	ALA	LBH; 25	SAO	INDY															23rd	185	
2013	Dale Coyne Racing	18	Dallara DW12	Honda						DET; 1	**DET**; 3	TXS	MIL	IOW	POC	TOR; 7	TOR; 7	MDO	SNM	BAL	HOU; 16	HOU; 9	FON	23rd	185	
2014	Ed Carpenter Racing	20	Dallara DW12	Chevrolet	STP; 16	LBH; 1	ALA; 14	IMS; 19	INDY	DET; 21	DET; 11	TXS	HOU; 17	HOU; 13	POC	IOW	TOR; 15	TOR; 1	MDO; 13	MIL	SNM; 14	FON		23rd	252	

^{1} The Las Vegas Indy 300 was abandoned after Dan Wheldon died from injuries sustained in a 15-car crash on lap 11.

Years	Teams	Races	Poles	Wins	Podiums (Non-win)	Top 10s (Non-podium)	Indianapolis 500 wins	Championships
6	6	71	1	4	3	13	0	0

==== Indianapolis 500 ====
Year	Chassis	Engine	Start	Finish	Team	Note
2009	Dallara IR-05	Honda HI7R V8	27	18	Dreyer & Reinbold Racing	Completed every lap
2010	Dallara IR-05	Honda HI7R V8	15	19	Dreyer & Reinbold Racing	Accident
2011	Dallara IR-05	Honda HI7R V8	DNQ		Andretti Autosport	Did not qualify
2012	Dallara DW12	Honda HI12TT V6 t	29	29	A. J. Foyt Enterprises	Accident

=== Complete V8 Supercar results ===
Year	Team	No.	Car	1	2	3	4	5	6	7	8	9	10	11	12	13	14	15	16	17	18	19	20	21	22	23	24	25	26	27	28	29	30	31	Final pos	Points
2012	Lucas Dumbrell Motorsport	30	Holden VE Commodore	ADE; R1	ADE; R2	SYM; R3	SYM; R4	HAM; R5	HAM; R6	BAR; R7	BAR; R8	BAR; R9	PHI; R10	PHI; R11	HID; R12	HID; R13	TOW; R14	TOW; R15	QLD; R16	QLD; R17	SMP; R18	SMP; R19	SAN; Q	SAN; R20	BAT; R21	SUR; R22; 14	SUR; R23; 16	YMC; R24	YMC; R25	YMC; R26	WIN; R27	WIN; R28	SYD; R29	SYD; R30	NC	0 †

† Not Eligible for points

=== Complete FIA World Endurance Championship results ===
Year	Entrant	Class	Car	Engine	1	2	3	4	5	6	7	8	9	Rank	Points
2013	G-Drive Racing	LMP2	Oreca 03	Nissan VK45DE 4.5 L V8	SIL; 6	SPA; 4	LMS; EX	**SÃO**; 1	**COA**; 1	FUJ; 2	**SHA**; 1	BHR; 1		3rd	132
2014	Toyota Racing	LMP1	Toyota TS040 Hybrid	Toyota RV8KLM 3.7 L V8 (Hybrid)	SIL	SPA	LMS	COA; 6	FUJ	SHA	BHR; 1	SÃO; 4		11th	45
2015	Toyota Racing	LMP1	Toyota TS040 Hybrid	Toyota RV8KLM 3.7 L V8 (Hybrid)	SIL; 4	SPA; 5	LMS; 6	NÜR; 6	COA; Ret	FUJ; 6	SHA; 5	BHR; 3		6th	79
2016	Toyota Gazoo Racing	LMP1	Toyota TS050 Hybrid	Toyota H8909 2.4 L Turbo V6 (Hybrid)	SIL; 2	SPA; Ret	LMS; 2	NÜR; 6	MEX; 3	COA; 3	FUJ; 1	SHA; 2	BHR; 5	3rd	145
2017	Toyota Gazoo Racing	LMP1	Toyota TS050 Hybrid	Toyota H8909 2.4 L Turbo V6 (Hybrid)	**SIL**; 13	SPA; 2	**LMS**; Ret	**NÜR**; 3	MEX; 4	COA; 4	FUJ; 2	**SHA**; 4	BHR; 4	5th	103.5
2018–19	Toyota Gazoo Racing	LMP1	Toyota TS050 Hybrid	Toyota H8909 2.4 L Turbo V6 (Hybrid)	SPA; 2	LMS; 2	**SIL**; DSQ	FUJ; 1	**SHA**; 1	SEB; 2	**SPA**; 6	**LMS**; 2		2nd	157
2019–20	Toyota Gazoo Racing	LMP1	Toyota TS050 Hybrid	Toyota H8909 2.4 L Turbo V6 (Hybrid)	**SIL**; 1	FUJ; 2	SHA; 3	BHR; 1	COA; 3	SPA; 1	**LMS**; 3	**BHR**; 1		1st	207
2021	Toyota Gazoo Racing	Hypercar	Toyota GR010 Hybrid	Toyota H8909 3.5 L Turbo V6 (Hybrid)	**SPA**; 3	ALG; 2	**MNZ**; 1	**LMS**; 1	BHR; 1	**BHR**; 2				1st	173
2022	Toyota Gazoo Racing	Hypercar	Toyota GR010 Hybrid	Toyota H8909 3.5 L Turbo V6 (Hybrid)	SEB; Ret	SPA; 1	LMS; 2	MNZ; 3	**FUJ**; 2	BHR; 1				3rd	133
2023	Toyota Gazoo Racing	Hypercar	Toyota GR010 Hybrid	Toyota H8909 3.5 L Turbo V6 (Hybrid)	SEB; 1	ALG; 9	**SPA**; 1	LMS; Ret	**MNZ**; 1	**FUJ**; 1	BHR; 2			2nd	145
2024	Toyota Gazoo Racing	Hypercar	Toyota GR010 Hybrid	Toyota H8909 3.5 L Turbo V6 (Hybrid)	QAT; 5	IMO; 1	SPA; 7	LMS	**SÃO**; 4	COA; 2	FUJ; Ret	BHR; Ret		6th	77
2025	Toyota Gazoo Racing	Hypercar	Toyota GR010 Hybrid	Toyota H8909 3.5 L Turbo V6 (Hybrid)	QAT; 6	IMO; 7	SPA; 7	LMS; 5	SÃO; 14	COA	FUJ; 7	**BHR**; 1		6th	89
2026	Toyota Racing	Hypercar	Toyota TR010 Hybrid	Toyota H8909 3.5 L Turbo V6 (Hybrid)	IMO; 3	SPA; 5	LMS; 1	SÃO; 12	COA; Ret	FUJ; 8	CAT; 2	MNZ; 11		2nd	97

=== Complete 24 Hours of Le Mans results ===
Year	Team	Co-drivers	Car	Class	Laps	Pos.	Class pos.
2013	(Russia) G-Drive Racing	(Australia) John Martin (Russia) Roman Rusinov	Oreca 03-Nissan	LMP2	327	EX	EX
2015	(Japan) Toyota Racing	(Austria) Alexander Wurz (France) Stéphane Sarrazin	Toyota TS040 Hybrid	LMP1	387	6th	6th
2016	(Japan) Toyota Gazoo Racing	(Japan) Kamui Kobayashi (France) Stéphane Sarrazin	Toyota TS050 Hybrid	LMP1	381	**2nd**	**2nd**
2017	(Japan) Toyota Gazoo Racing	(Japan) Kamui Kobayashi (France) Stéphane Sarrazin	Toyota TS050 Hybrid	LMP1	154	DNF	DNF
2018	(Japan) Toyota Gazoo Racing	(Japan) Kamui Kobayashi (Argentina) José María López	Toyota TS050 Hybrid	LMP1	386	**2nd**	**2nd**
2019	(Japan) Toyota Gazoo Racing	(Japan) Kamui Kobayashi (Argentina) José María López	Toyota TS050 Hybrid	LMP1	385	**2nd**	**2nd**
2020	(Japan) Toyota Gazoo Racing	(Japan) Kamui Kobayashi (Argentina) José María López	Toyota TS050 Hybrid	LMP1	381	**3rd**	**3rd**
2021	(Japan) Toyota Gazoo Racing	(Japan) Kamui Kobayashi (Argentina) José María López	Toyota GR010 Hybrid	Hypercar	371	**1st**	**1st**
2022	(Japan) Toyota Gazoo Racing	(Japan) Kamui Kobayashi (Argentina) José María López	Toyota GR010 Hybrid	Hypercar	380	**2nd**	**2nd**
2023	(Japan) Toyota Gazoo Racing	(Japan) Kamui Kobayashi (Argentina) José María López	Toyota GR010 Hybrid	Hypercar	103	DNF	DNF
2025	(Japan) Toyota Gazoo Racing	(Japan) Kamui Kobayashi (Netherlands) Nyck de Vries	Toyota GR010 Hybrid	Hypercar	386	5th	5th
2026	(Japan) Toyota Racing	(Japan) Kamui Kobayashi (Netherlands) Nyck de Vries	Toyota TR010 Hybrid	Hypercar	381	**1st**	**1st**

=== Complete Formula E results ===
(key) (Races in bold indicate pole position; races in italics indicate fastest lap)

Year	Team	Chassis	Powertrain	1	2	3	4	5	6	7	8	9	10	11	12	Pos	Points
2015–16	Venturi Formula E Team	Spark SRT01-e	Venturi VM200-FE-01	BEI	PUT	PDE	BUE; 15	MEX; 12	LBH; 10	PAR; 14	BER; 8	LDN; 9	LDN; 13			16th	7
2016–17	Faraday Future Dragon Racing	Spark SRT01-e	Penske 701-EV	HKG	MRK	BUE	MEX	MCO	PAR; 14	BER	BER	NYC	NYC	MTL	MTL	24th	0

=== Complete European Le Mans Series results ===
Year	Entrant	Class	Chassis	Engine	1	2	3	4	5	6	Rank	Points
2016	Thiriet by TDS Racing	LMP2	Oreca 05	Nissan VK45DE 4.5 L V8	SIL	IMO	RBR	**LEC**; 1	SPA	EST	14th	26

=== Complete IMSA SportsCar Championship results ===
Year	Entrant	No.	Class	Engine	Chassis	1	2	3	4	5	6	7	8	9	10	11	Rank	Points
2017	Whelen Engineering Racing	31	P	Cadillac DPi-V.R	Cadillac 6.2 L V8	DAY; 6	SEB; 3	LBH	COA	DET	WGL	MOS	ELK	LGA	PET; 2		18th	88
2018	Whelen Engineering Racing	31	P	Cadillac DPi-V.R	Cadillac 5.5 L V8	DAY; 2	SEB; 3	LBH	MDO	DET	WGL; 7	MOS	ELK	LGA	PET		25th	86
2019	Mustang Sampling Racing	5	DPi	Cadillac DPi-V.R	Cadillac 5.5 L V8	DAY	SEB	LBH	MDO	DET	WGL; 6	MOS	ELK	LGA	PET; 7		24th	49
2020	Whelen Engineering Racing	31	DPi	Cadillac DPi-V.R	Cadillac 5.5 L V8	DAY; 7	DAY	SEB	ELK	ATL	MDO	PET	LGA	SEB			26th	24
2021	Whelen Engineering Racing	31	DPi	Cadillac DPi-V.R	Cadillac 5.5 L V8	**DAY**; 6	**SEB**; 6	MDO	DET	WGL; 4	WGL	ELK	LGA	LBH	**PET**; 2		11th	1231
2022	Whelen Engineering Racing	31	DPi	Cadillac DPi-V.R	Cadillac 5.5 L V8	DAY; 4	SEB; 3	LBH	LGA	MDO	DET	WGL; 5	MOS	ELK	PET; 2		10th	1266
2023	Vasser Sullivan Racing	14	GTD Pro	Lexus RC F GT3	Toyota 2UR 5.0 L V8	DAY; 3	SEB	LBH	LGA	WGL	MOS	LIM	ELK	VIR	IMS	PET	23rd	330
2024	VasserSullivan	14	GTD Pro	Lexus RC F GT3	Toyota 2UR 5.0 L V8	DAY; 11	SEB	LGA	DET	WGL	MOS	ELK	VIR	IMS	PET		41st	232

=== Complete 24 Hours of Daytona results ===
Year	Team	Co-drivers	Car	Class	Laps	Pos.	Class pos.
2017	(United States) Whelen Engineering Racing	(United States) Dane Cameron (United States) Eric Curran (United Kingdom) Seb Morris	Cadillac DPi-V.R	P	639	14th	6th
2018	(United States) Whelen Engineering Racing	(United States) Eric Curran (United Kingdom) Stuart Middleton (Brazil) Felipe Nasr	Cadillac DPi-V.R	P	808	**2nd**	**2nd**
2020	(United States) Whelen Engineering Racing	(Portugal) Filipe Albuquerque (Brazil) Pipo Derani (Brazil) Felipe Nasr	Cadillac DPi-V.R	DPi	822	7th	7th
2021	(United States) Whelen Engineering Racing	(Brazil) Pipo Derani (United States) Chase Elliott (Brazil) Felipe Nasr	Cadillac DPi-V.R	DPi	783	8th	6th
2022	(United States) Whelen Engineering Racing	(Brazil) Pipo Derani (United States) Tristan Nunez	Cadillac DPi-V.R	DPi	761	4th	4th
2023	(United States) Vasser Sullivan Racing	(United Kingdom) Ben Barnicoat (United Kingdom) Jack Hawksworth	Lexus RC F GT3	GTD Pro	729	20th	**3rd**

Sporting positions
Preceded by Lewis Hamilton	Formula Renault UK; Champion; 2004	Succeeded by Oliver Jarvis
Preceded by Álvaro Parente	British Formula Three Champion; 2006	Succeeded by Marko Asmer
Preceded by Lucas di Grassi	Macau Grand Prix; Winner; 2006	Succeeded by Oliver Jarvis
Preceded by Sébastien Buemi; Kazuki Nakajima; Fernando Alonso	World Endurance Drivers Champion; 2019–20, 2021; With: Kamui Kobayashi & José María López	Succeeded by Sébastien Buemi; Brendon Hartley; Ryō Hirakawa
Preceded by Sébastien Buemi; Brendon Hartley; Kazuki Nakajima	Winner of the 24 Hours of Le Mans; 2021; With: Kamui Kobayashi & José María López	Succeeded by Sébastien Buemi; Brendon Hartley; Ryō Hirakawa
Preceded by Phil Hanson; Robert Kubica; Yifei Ye	Winner of the 24 Hours of Le Mans; 2026; With: Kamui Kobayashi & Nyck de Vries	Succeeded by Incumbent
Awards and achievements
Preceded by Matt Neal	Autosport; National Racing Driver of the Year; 2006	Succeeded by Jason Plato
