= Rotax Max Challenge =

Kart racing series

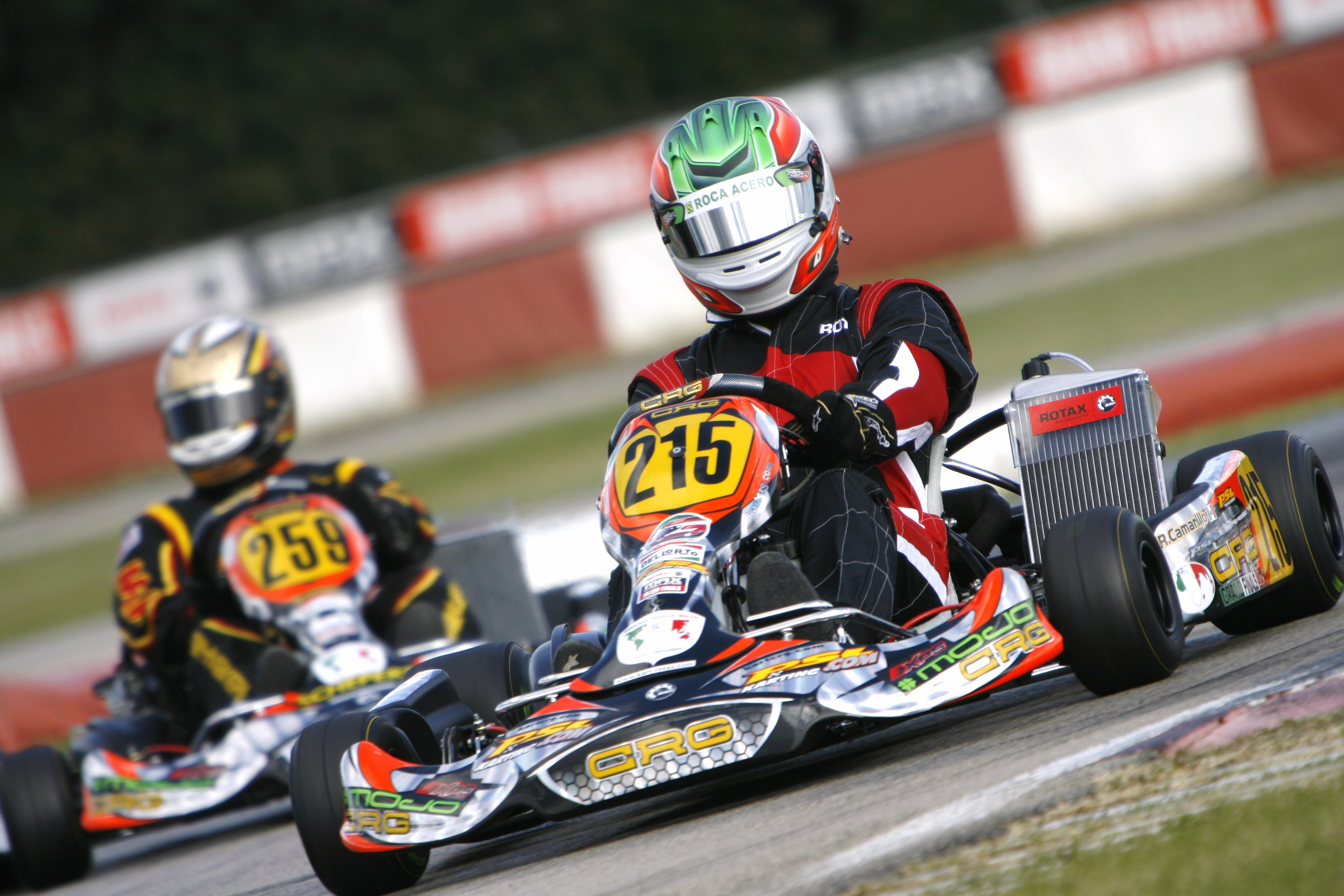
Rotax Max DD2 karts

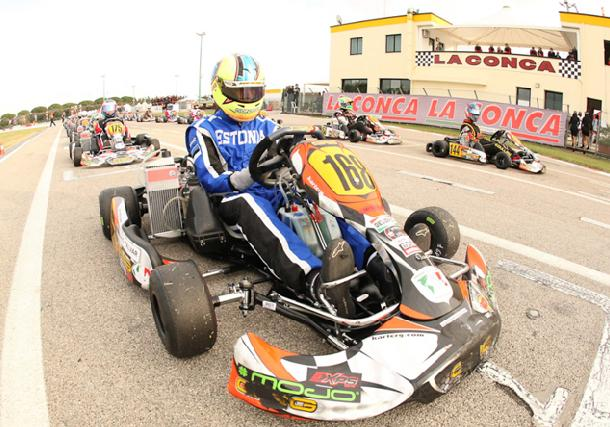
Racing kart

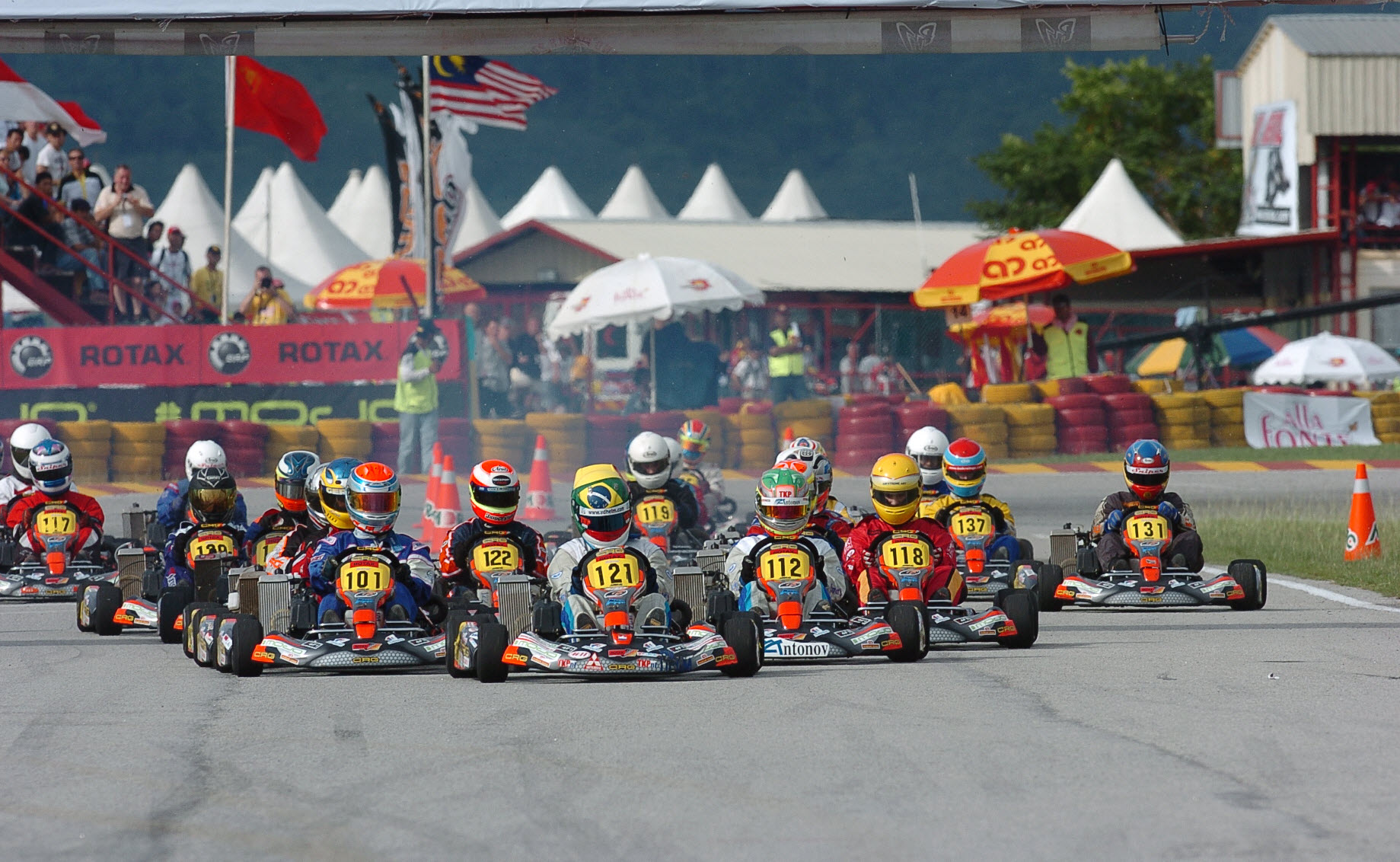
The start of the race

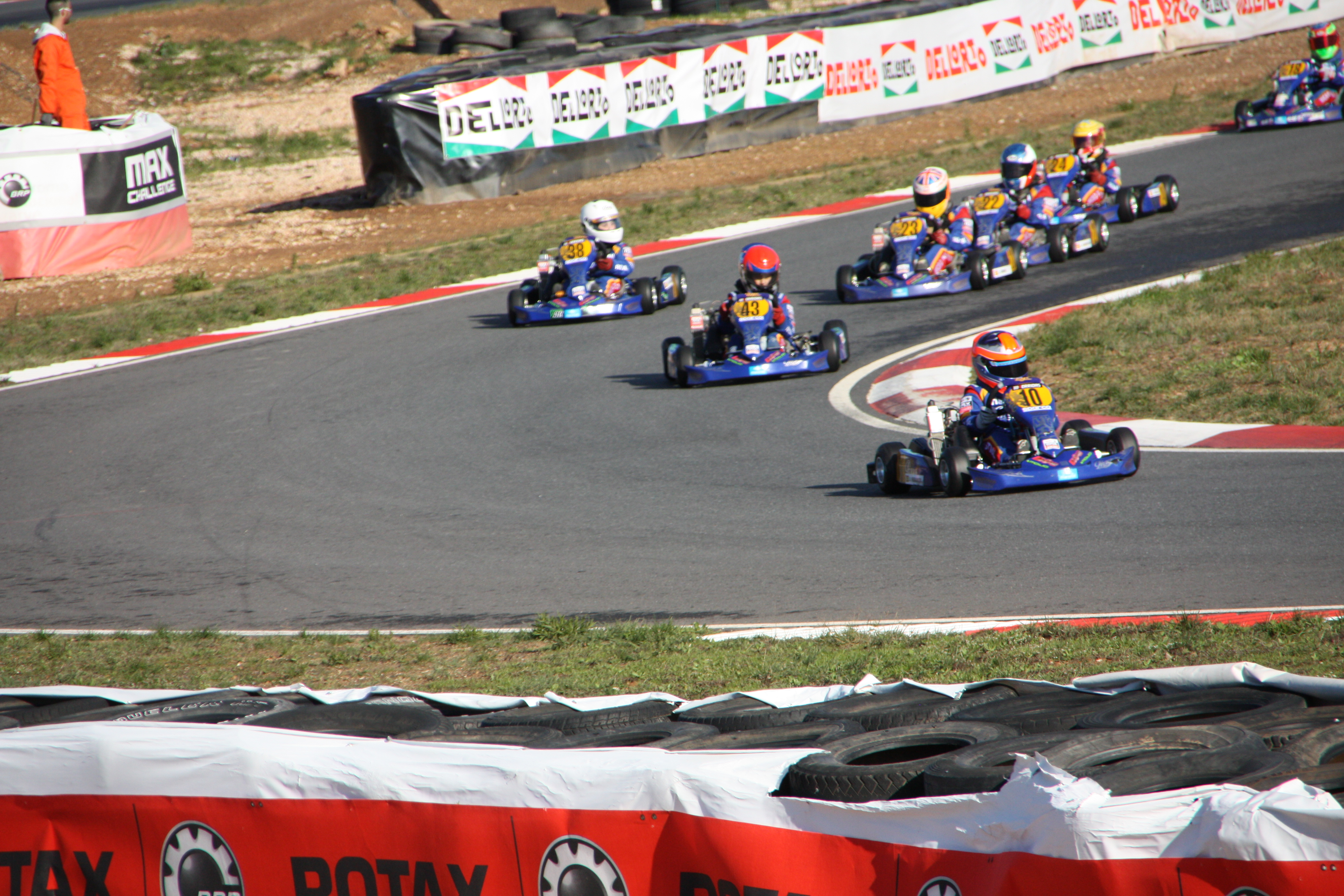
On the track

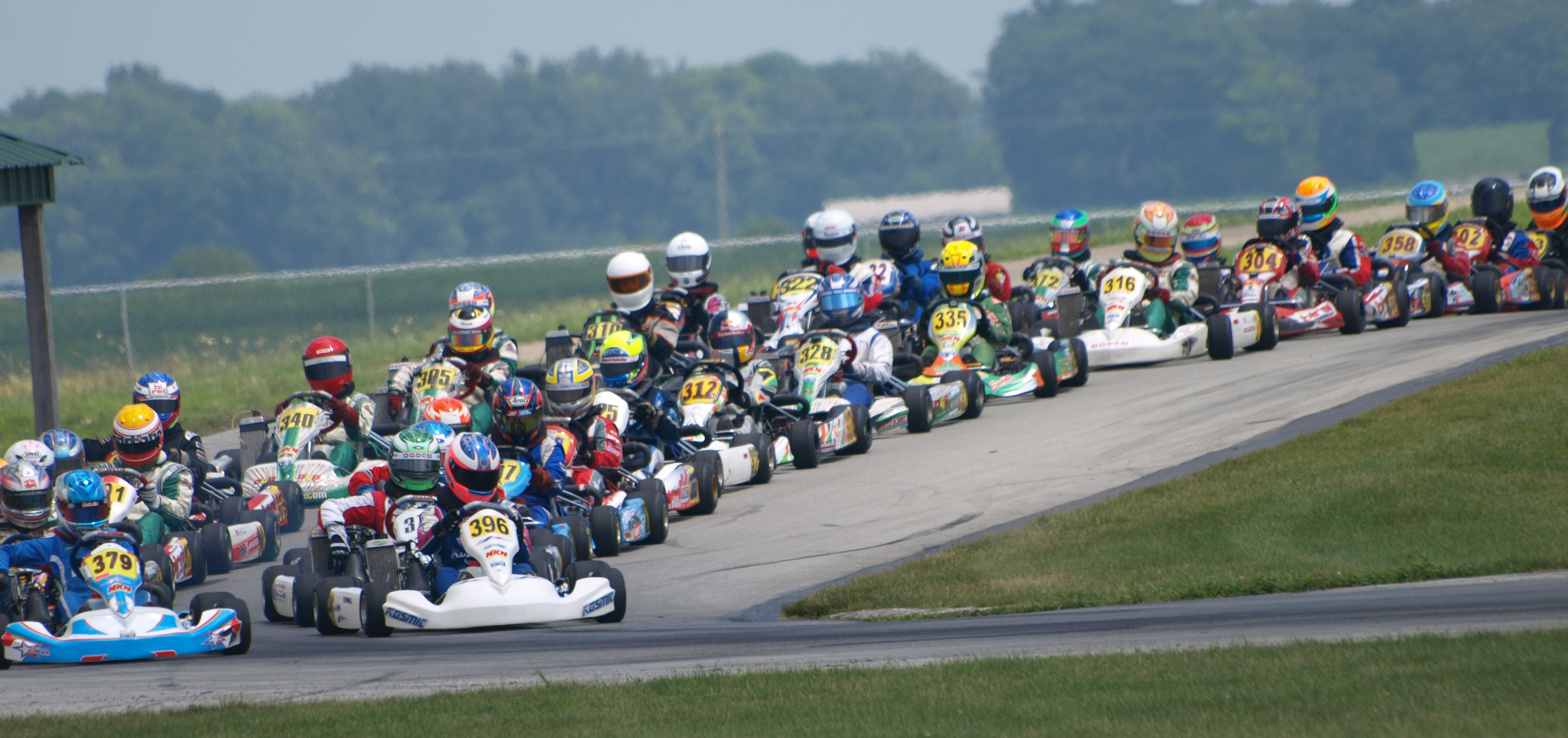
Jr Rotax - 2010 US Grand Nationals

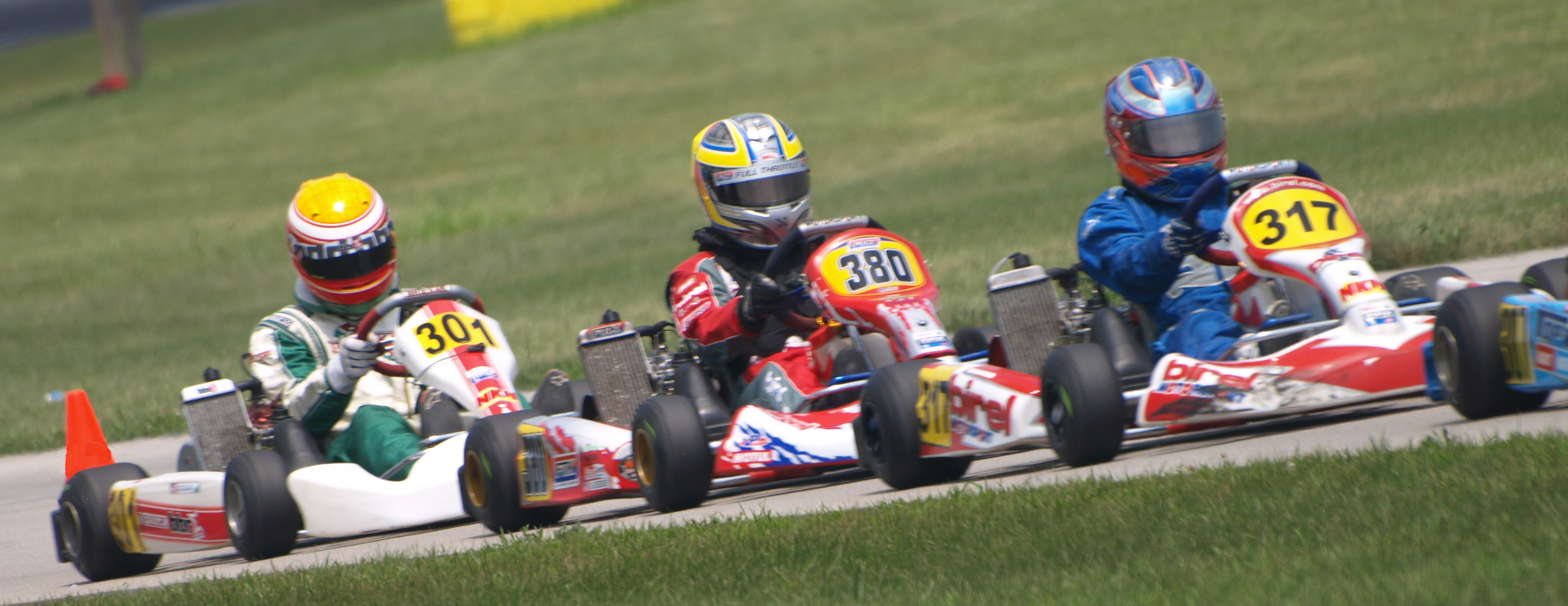
Jr Rotax

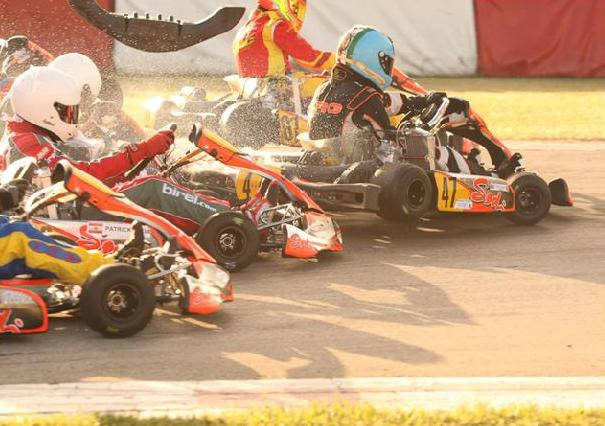
Accident at the race

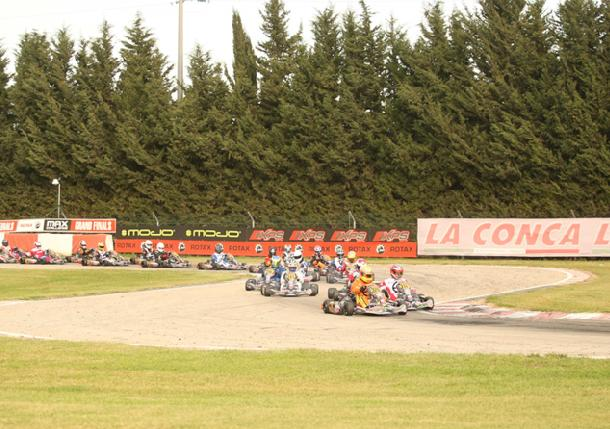
On the track in Italy

The Rotax Max Challenge (RMC) is a kart racing series owned and organized worldwide by BRP-Rotax and its distributors, approved and in compliance with CIK-FIA. Competition takes place on a club, national and international level which culminates in the Grand Finals once a year.

== Concept ==
The RMC follows a "one-make-engine" formula: only Rotax Max kart engines are allowed. The success in the competition is mainly up to the skills of the driver and that driver's experience in the set up of the engine and the chassis.

Three race classes are recognized for international competition:

Class	Power	Age
Junior MAX	17 kW (23 hp)	10–16 years of age
MAX	22 kW (30 hp)	13 years and older
DD2, 2 speed shifter class	25 kW (34 hp)	13 years and older

Competition at the national level can include additional classes at the discretion of each national RMC. For example, the US RMC includes the following classes:

Class	Power	Age
Micro MAX	6 kW (8 hp)	7–10 years of age
Mini MAX	11 kW (15 hp)	9–12 years of age
Junior MAX	17 kW (23 hp)	13–16 years of age
Senior MAX	22 kW (30 hp)	15 years and older
Masters MAX	22 kW (30 hp)	32 years and older
DD2 MAX, 2 speed shifter class	25 kW (34 hp)	Senior: 15 years and older/ Masters: 32 years and older

Authorised distributors of Rotax kart products offer their customers a national RMC programme according to the “Rotax Sporting and Technical Regulations” defined by BRP-Rotax. This results in a fair competition between kart racers that share the same interests.

National Rotax Max Challenge:

- nearly 7,500 active Rotax MAX drivers in the RMC programme as well as another 7,500 active drivers in race series following the RMC idea.
- competing in around 60 countries on all 5 continents around the globe

International / Continental Rotax Max Challenge competitions:

- Rotax MAX Euro Challenge (over 150 drivers participating)
- Rotax MAX Asia Challenge (Indonesia, Malaysia, Philippines, Thailand, China)
- Rotax MAX US Open

Out of all national as well as continental and international series, drivers qualify for the annual RMC Grand Finals, which is an invitational race. BRP-Powertrain and its partners supply all engines and karts for the event.

== RMC Grand Finals ==
The Grand Finals of the RMC is an international CIK event. Drivers can qualify for the RMC Grand Final via the national Challenge of their home country and the international RMC. The season's winners of each class of all national RMCs and of the international RMC participate free of cost.

The Rotax MAX Challenge Grand Finals is by far the fairest, most international kart sporting event in the world – since all drivers have the same controlled and sealed engines, chassis, tyres and fuel – leaving only the drivers skill to determine the winner of the competition. Every year, competitors from around 60 countries, from five continents, can qualify for the annual Grand Finals of the Rotax Max Challenge.

=== History ===
The first edition of the Grand Finals took place in 2000 on the island of Puerto Rico with 66 drivers representing 19 countries.

In 2001, finalists were invited to the tropical island of Langkawi in Malaysia. That year, 68 drivers from 29 countries compete for the RMC "world champion" title.

South Africa hosted the Grand Finals in 2002, on a track just outside Pretoria. Drivers from 33 nations were vying for the gold.

In 2003, the Rotax Max Challenge Grand Finals moved to Egypt. That year, the Junior category was introduced. It was also the company's first time cooperating with a chassis manufacturer in order to supply comparable karts to the competitors. The Junior category raced on a 'single make' chassis supplied by CRG while the seniors raced on their private chassis. This move increased the number of participants to almost 100, representing close to 40 countries.

The volcanic island of Lanzarote in Spain welcomed the 5th Grand Finals in 2004. That event saw for the first time all competitors racing on supplied 'single make' chassis provided by CRG for the Junior category and by BRP-Rotax for the Senior category. Another milestone was the first use by the senior category of the Rotax RM1 chassis with the new 2-speed shifter engine–the 125 MAX DD2.

The Grand Finals returned to Malaysia in 2005. This time, BRP-Rotax presented an even larger event by running three categories: Junior MAX, Senior MAX and the RM1 shifter (now DD2). The event attracted 140 drivers from 43 nations.

Viana do Castelo in Portugal was the host of the 2006 edition of the RMC Grand Finals and reached a record 186 participants from about 50 countries.

In 2007, the 8th RMC Grand Finals took place at the Al Ain Raceway, a modern and brand new kart racing facility in Al Ain, United Arab Emirates operated by Pro Motorsports / Al Ain Sportplex.

In 2008, the racing event moved to the track of La Conca in Muro Leccese, Italy, with 216 drivers. The circuit is located 80 km south of Brindisi and close to the city of Otranto in Apulia.

The 2009 edition took place in December on the desert track of Ghibli Raceway Sharm el-Sheikh, Egypt.

For 2010 the event is heading towards the south of Italy again. At this event the first time 252 drivers will participate as a new category the 125 DD2 MASTERS was added, which is a category for the +32 years old.

2011 was the 12th edition of the Rotax Max Challenge Grand Finals at Al Ain/United Arab Emirates with 265 drivers from over 60 countries.

2012 Portugal hosted the Rotax MAX Challenge Grand Finals for the second time. 276 drivers participated.

In 2013 the Grand Finals took place in New Orleans/United States and thus it is the first time for the RMCGF to be hosted on American turf. 360 drivers participated in the race.

2014 was the 15th edition of the RMCGF and was hosted in Valencia/Spain. This was the third time that the Grand Finals take place on the Iberian Peninsula after Portugal in 2006 and 2012.

The 2015 Rotax MAX Challenge Grand Finals (RMCGF) were held at the Kartódromo Internacional do Algarve. At the conclusion of the event, the United States won the Nations Cup.

The 17th edition of the Rotax MAX Challenge Grand Finals (RMCGF) will take place at the Circuito Internazionale di Napoli in Sarno, Italy from October 16 to 22, 2016. This event also saw the Micro and Mini classes count as official titles for the first time, having been held as support races for several years, meaning that this edition featured the largest RMCGF entry in its history.

The 2020 edition was originally scheduled to be contested at Sarno, however it was cancelled due to the COVID-19 Pandemic. A replacement race, named the International Trophy, was organised at Portimao.

=== Winners ===
Year	Driver	Class	Event Location
2000	(South Africa) Gavin Cronje	MAX	Puerto Rico
2001	(South Africa) Claudio Piazza-Musso	MAX	Malaysia
2002	(South Africa) Mark Cronje	MAX	South Africa
2003	(South Africa) Cristiano Morgado	MAX	Egypt
2003	(Spain) Omar Martin	Junior	Egypt
2004	(South Africa) Wesleigh Orr	RM1	Spain
2004	(France) Sam Ghalleb	MAX Masters	Spain
2004	(France) Benjamin Salvatore	Junior	Spain
2005	(South Africa) Wesleigh Orr	RM1	Malaysia
2005	(Netherlands) Luuk Glansdorp	MAX	Malaysia
2005	(Indonesia) Satya Rasa	MAX Masters	Malaysia
2005	(Estonia) Kenneth Hildebrand	Junior	Malaysia
2006	(Australia) Ben George	DD2	Portugal
2006	(Netherlands) Ricardo Romkema	MAX	Portugal
2006	(Canada) Luc Sauriol	MAX Masters	Portugal
2006	(Netherlands) Jorrit Pex	Junior	Portugal
2006	United Kingdom	Nations Cup	Portugal
2007	(Canada) Pier-Luc Ouellette	DD2	United Arab Emirates
2007	(Belgium) Christophe Adams	DD2 Masters	United Arab Emirates
2007	(United Kingdom) Benjy Russell	MAX	United Arab Emirates
2007	(United Kingdom) Colin Davis	MAX Masters	United Arab Emirates
2007	(Estonia) Kevin Korjus	Junior	United Arab Emirates
2007	Canada	Nations Cup	United Arab Emirates
2008	(South Africa) Leeroy Poulter	DD2	Italy
2008	(Netherlands) Dennis Kroes	DD2 Masters	Italy
2008	(United Kingdom) Ben Cooper	MAX	Italy
2008	(Republic of Ireland) Martin Pierce	MAX Masters	Italy
2008	(Argentina) Facundo Chapur	Junior	Italy
2008	United Kingdom	Nations Cup	Italy
2009	(South Africa) Caleb Williams	DD2	Egypt
2009	(Spain) Perez J. Santander	DD2 Masters	Egypt
2009	(United Kingdom) Luke Varley	MAX	Egypt
2009	(Belgium) Christophe Adams	MAX Masters	Egypt
2009	(Japan) Ukyo Sasahara	Junior	Egypt
2009	United Kingdom	Nations Cup	Egypt
2010	(Canada) Daniel Morad	DD2	Italy
2010	(Canada) Scott Cambell	DD2 Masters	Italy
2010	(South Africa) Caleb Williams	MAX	Italy
2010	(Estonia) Martin Rump	Junior	Italy
2010	Spain	Nations Cup	Italy
2011	(Canada) Pier-Luc Ouellette	DD2	United Arab Emirates
2011	(South Africa) Cristiano Morgado	DD2 Masters	United Arab Emirates
2011	(United Kingdom) Ben Cooper	MAX	United Arab Emirates
2011	(Japan) Ukyo Sasahara	Junior	United Arab Emirates
2011	Australia	Nations Cup	United Arab Emirates
2012	(United Kingdom) Ben Cooper	DD2	Portugal
2012	(South Africa) Cristiano Morgado	DD2 Masters	Portugal
2012	(Republic of Ireland) Charlie Eastwood	MAX	Portugal
2012	(United Kingdom) Harry Webb	Junior	Portugal
2012	United Kingdom	Nations Cup	Portugal
2013	(Lithuania) Simas Juodvirsis	DD2	United States
2013	(South Africa) Cristiano Morgado	DD2 Masters	United States
2013	(United Kingdom) Oliver Hodgson	MAX	United States
2013	(United States) Juan Manuel Correa	Junior	United States
2013	United States	Nations Cup	United States
2014	(United Kingdom) Sean Babington	DD2	Spain
2014	(Finland) Mikko Laine	DD2 Masters	Spain
2014	(Spain) Carlos Gil	Senior	Spain
2014	(Estonia) Jüri Vips	Junior	Spain
2014	South Africa	Nations Cup	Spain
2015	(Hungary) Ferenc Kancsar	DD2	Portugal
2015	(New Zealand) Ryan Urban	DD2 Masters	Portugal
2015	(Italy) Alex Irlando	Senior	Portugal
2015	(France) Florian Venturi	Junior	Portugal
2015	United States	Nations Cup	Portugal
2016	(Hungary) Ferenc Kancsar	DD2	Italy
2016	(Australia) Lee Mitchener	DD2 Masters	Italy
2016	(Russia) Denis Mavlanov	Senior	Italy
2016	(United Kingdom) Mark Kimber	Junior	Italy
2016	(South Africa) Jayden Els	Mini	Italy
2016	(United States) Diego Laroque	Micro	Italy
2016	Canada	Nations Cup	Italy
2017	(Australia) Cody Gillis	DD2	Portugal
2017	(Australia) Troy Woolston	DD2 Masters	Portugal
2017	(United Kingdom) Brett Ward	Senior	Portugal
2017	(Netherlands) Tijmen van der Helm	Junior	Portugal
2017	(France) Marcus Amand	Mini	Portugal
2017	(France) Louis Iglésias	Micro	Portugal
2017	Australia	Nations Cup	Portugal
2018	(France) Paolo Besancenez	DD2	Brazil
2018	(South Africa) Cristiano Morgado	DD2 Masters	Brazil
2018	(Netherlands) Senna van Walstijn	Senior	Brazil
2018	(Netherlands) Robert de Haan	Junior	Brazil
2018	(Germany) Farin Megger	Mini	Brazil
2018	(United States) Brent Crews	Micro	Brazil
2018	Brazil	Nations Cup	Brazil
2019	(Czech Republic) Petr Bezel	DD2	Italy
2019	(Austria) Robert Pesevski	DD2 Masters	Italy
2019	(Finland) Axel Saarniala	Senior	Italy
2019	(New Zealand) Clay Osborne	Junior	Italy
2019	(France) Jolan Raccamier	Mini	Italy
2019	(New Zealand) Jay Urwin	Micro	Italy
2019	France	Nations Cup	Italy
2020	(Belgium) Xander Przybylak	DD2	Portugal
2020	(Latvia) Henrijs Grube	DD2 Masters	Portugal
2020	(United Kingdom) Morgan Porter	Senior	Portugal
2020	(United Kingdom) Daniel Guinchard	Junior	Portugal
2020	(Latvia) Alexander Skjelten	Mini	Portugal
2020	(Lebanon) Christopher El Feghali	Micro	Portugal
2021	(Netherlands) Martijn van Leeuwen	DD2	Bahrain
2021	(France) Morgan Riche	DD2 Masters	Bahrain
2021	(United Kingdom) Mark Kimber	Senior	Bahrain
2021	(Latvia) Tomass Štolcermanis	Junior	Bahrain
2021	(Japan) Arata Endo	Mini	Bahrain
2021	(Estonia) Nikita Ljubimov	Micro	Bahrain
2021	France	Nations Cup	Bahrain
2022	(United Kingdom) Mark Kimber	DD2	Portugal
2022	(Latvia) Kristaps Gasparovics	DD2 Masters	Portugal
2022	(United Kingdom) Callum Bradshaw	Senior	Portugal
2022	(United Kingdom) Scott Marsh	Junior	Portugal
2022	(Lebanon) Christopher El Feghali	Mini	Portugal
2022	(Portugal) Martim Marques	Micro	Portugal
2022	(United Kingdom) Great Britain	Nations Cup	Portugal
2023	(Estonia) Ragnar Veerus	DD2	Bahrain
2023	(Canada) Ben Cooper	DD2 Masters	Bahrain
2023	(Serbia) Andrej Petrović	Senior	Bahrain
2023	(United Kingdom) Timo Jüngling	Junior	Bahrain
2023	(United Kingdom) Rory Armstrong	Mini	Bahrain
2023	(United Kingdom) Jenson Chalk	Micro	Bahrain
2023	(United Kingdom) Great Britain	Nations Cup	Bahrain
2024	(Slovenia) Xen De Ruwe	DD2	Italy
2024	(France) Nicolas Picot	DD2 Masters	Italy
2024	(Belgium) Vic Stevens	Senior	Italy
2024	(United Kingdom) Jacob Ashcroft	Junior	Italy
2024	(Czech Republic) Zdenek Babicek	Mini	Italy
2024	(United Kingdom) Joshua Cooke	Micro	Italy
2024	(United Kingdom) Great Britain	Nations Cup	Italy
2025	(Netherlands) Sam Knopjes	DD2	Bahrain
2025	(Lithuania) Martynus Tankevicius	DD2 Masters	Bahrain
2025	(United Kingdom) Macauley Bishop	Senior	Bahrain
2025	(Lithuania) Majus Mazinas	Junior	Bahrain
2025	(United Kingdom) Tom Read	Mini	Bahrain
2025	(United Arab Emirates) Benjamin Karajkovic	Micro	Bahrain
2025	(United Kingdom) Great Britain	Nations Cup	Bahrain
