= Cristiano Morgado =

South African racing driver

- Nationality: (South Africa) South African (Portugal) Portuguese
- Born: 27 August 1979 (age 47) Johannesburg (South Africa)

Championship titles
- 2011, 2012, 2013, 2018: Rotax Max Challenge Grand Finals (DD2 Masters) World Champion

Awards
- Protea Colours

Cristiano Morgado (born 27 August 1979) is a South African racing driver of Portuguese descent who is a five-time Rotax Max Challenge World Champion. He is the first and only driver to have won five Rotax world titles, establishing him as one of the most successful drivers in the competition's history. His achievements in the sport have been profiled in international publications such as Vroom International Karting Magazine. In addition to his karting career, Morgado has competed in single-seater car racing, achieving success in the British Formula 3 International Series and Formula Volkswagen South Africa. He also represented A1 Team South Africa in the A1 Grand Prix.

== Career ==
=== Karting and early single-seaters ===
Morgado began his international career in karting, winning his first Rotax Max Challenge World Championship in 2004. He followed this by winning the European Championship in the RM1 class the next year. The same year as his first world title, Morgado transitioned to car racing, making an immediate impact by securing pole position for the prestigious Formula Ford Festival at Brands Hatch.

=== British Formula 3 and A1 Grand Prix ===
In 2006, Morgado competed in the National Class of the British Formula 3 International Series, where he achieved four wins and finished the season as the championship runner-up. His achievements in motorsport led to him being awarded Protea Colours, a high honour for South African sportspeople. Morgado returned to South Africa in 2008 to compete in the inaugural Formula Volkswagen South Africa Championship, where he dominated the season with eight race wins. His success earned him a call-up to A1 Team South Africa for the 2008–09 A1 Grand Prix season. He served as the team's test driver in Taupō, New Zealand, before being selected for the final race weekends of the season in Portimão, Portugal, and Brands Hatch, England.

=== Return to Karting and Record-Breaking Dominance ===
Morgado is best known for his record-breaking success in the Rotax Max Challenge Grand Finals, an annual event considered the "Olympics of karting," where competitors gain entry by winning a national or international championship rather than by paying. After returning to competitive karting, Morgado won the World Championship in the DD2 Masters class in 2011. He successfully defended his title in 2012 and secured a third consecutive championship in 2013 in New Orleans, USA. In 2018, competing in Brazil, he won his fifth Rotax world title. He secured pole position, won every heat, and led the final from start to finish, becoming the only driver in history to achieve this feat. His continued competitiveness at the national level secured his qualification for subsequent world finals, as he sought a potential sixth world crown.

=== Legacy and academy ===
Morgado's legacy in the sport was recognized by the Fédération Internationale de l'Automobile. In 2022, an initiative to develop the next generation of motorsport talent in Africa was officially named the ATCM Karting Academy Cristiano Morgado.
