= Formula Ford Festival =

UK motor race meeting

- Brands Hatch: the current host of the Festival
- Category: Single-seaters (Formula Ford)
- Country: United Kingdom
- Inaugural season: 1972
- Classes: Kent
- Engine suppliers: Ford Kent 1600
- Drivers' champion: (Republic of Ireland) Jason Smyth
- Official website: Formula Ford Festival

The Formula Ford Festival is an annual meeting of Ford-powered single-seat racing cars which is held at the end of the British racing season, at the Brands Hatch motor racing circuit in the county of Kent, in Southern England. The events are held over the course of a weekend and although various classes of past and present Formula Fords are present, the high point for many is the championship in which young but skilled drivers from Ford competitions in Europe and beyond race against one another. Often it is a rare chance to compare the skills of drivers who take part in different Ford competitions around the world. Many winners of the festival have gone on to enjoy professional careers in various branches of motorsport - including fourteen who have raced in Formula One.

The event is administered by the British Racing and Sports Car Club.

== History ==
=== Inception ===
The inaugural season in 1972 took place at Snetterton, where the festival was held until 1975. It then moved to Brands Hatch where it has stayed to date.

=== The Kent years ===
The Kent engine was the lead engine in early Formula Ford, and so from the first festival in 1972 until the Zetec was introduced in 1993.

=== The Zetec years ===
The 1800 cc Zetec engine was the leading engine from 1993 until the Duratec took over in 2006. Zetec remained an engine sub-class until 2014.

=== The Duratec engine ===
The 1600 cc Duratec engine is currently used in the leading races although the Zetec and Kent engines are still used in junior and classic classes of racing. Duratec remained the Festival champion class until 2014.

=== Loss of prominence ===
For many years the festival was the highlight of the Formula Ford season. Entries of several hundred cars from all over the Formula Ford world were common into the 1990s, with racers competing in knockout heats to decide the grid for a grand final. Entries have been declining and recent Festivals have struggled to attract more than 40-50 cars, enough for two heats and a final. Support races from other classes e.g. Caterham, Club F3, and Historic Sports 2000 have also been included in the program. This is because although the event still has the atmosphere of past years its position as a rite of passage for young drivers has largely been usurped by other junior formulae, mostly by the FIA backed Formula 4 and karting.

More "historic" FF1600 cars have been turning up for the supporting races than contemporary Zetecs, however, in 2006, the Festival saw the Duratec engine for the first time thereby having a final for all 3 marques at one meeting for the first time. The Walter Hayes Trophy now recognises the continuing interest in 1600cc 'Kent' Formula Ford and attracted over 150 entries in 2006, including several drivers more commonly seen in much more senior formulae, including current two-time IndyCar Series champion Josef Newgarden, who won the 2008 Kent class, the most recent prominent champion to have raced in this festival.

From 2015 the Festival became exclusively for Kent engined cars, restoring the Festival to its pre-1993 format.

=== Resurgence ===
In recent years the festival has seen an increase in entries across all classes notably helped by the success of the BRSCC SuperClassic Pre '99 Formula Ford Championship and the addition of stand alone races for Pre '82 machinery. The 54th running of the event saw 84 entries with 4 returning Champions and some competitors even travelling from Australia to take part in the famous event. iRacing has also partnered with the event running a virtual version on their ever popular racing simulator platform, increasing exposure to global audiences.

== Winners ==
Below is a list of overall festival winners. Since 1993, a secondary festival was run alongside for older specification cars running the Ford Kent engine. Since 2009, a third event has also been held for cars using the Ford Zetec engine.

* denotes later raced in Formula One

Year	Circuit	Overall Festival Winner			Kent Festival		Zetec Festival	
Year	Circuit	Driver	Chassis	Engine	Driver	Chassis	Driver	Chassis
1972	Snetterton	(United Kingdom) Ian Taylor	Dulon LD9	Ford Kent engine	Not Held		Not Held	
1973	Snetterton	(United Kingdom) Donald Macleod	Van Diemen FA73	Ford Kent engine	Not Held		Not Held	
1974	Snetterton	(United Kingdom) Richard Morgan	Crossle 25F	Ford Kent engine	Not Held		Not Held	
1975	Snetterton	(United Kingdom) Geoff Lees *	Royale RP21	Ford Kent engine	Not Held		Not Held	
1976	Brands Hatch	(Republic of Ireland) Derek Daly *	Hawke DL17	Ford Kent engine	Not Held		Not Held	
1977	Brands Hatch	(Brazil) Chico Serra *	Van Diemen RF77	Ford Kent engine	Not Held		Not Held	
1978	Brands Hatch	(Republic of Ireland) Michael Roe	Van Diemen RF78	Ford Kent engine	Not Held		Not Held	
1979	Brands Hatch	(United Kingdom) Donald Macleod	Sark 1	Ford Kent engine	Not Held		Not Held	
1980	Brands Hatch	(Brazil) Roberto Moreno *	Van Diemen RF80	Ford Kent engine	Not Held		Not Held	
1981	Brands Hatch	(Republic of Ireland) Tommy Byrne *	Van Diemen RF81	Ford Kent engine	Not Held		Not Held	
1982	Brands Hatch	(United Kingdom) Julian Bailey *	Lola T640E	Ford Kent engine	Not Held		Not Held	
1983	Brands Hatch	(United Kingdom) Andrew Gilbert-Scott	Reynard 83F	Ford Kent engine	Not Held		Not Held	
1984	Brands Hatch	(Netherlands) Gerrit van Kouwen	Lola T644E	Ford Kent engine	Not Held		Not Held	
1985	Brands Hatch	(United Kingdom) Johnny Herbert *	Quest FF85	Ford Kent engine	Not Held		Not Held	
1986	Brands Hatch	(Austria) Roland Ratzenberger *	Van Diemen RF86	Ford Kent engine	Not Held		Not Held	
1987	Brands Hatch	(United Kingdom) Eddie Irvine *	Van Diemen RF87	Ford Kent engine	Not Held		Not Held	
1988	Brands Hatch	(Italy) Vincenzo Sospiri *	Van Diemen RF88	Ford Kent engine	Not Held		Not Held	
1989	Brands Hatch	(Brazil) Niko Palhares	Van Diemen RF89	Ford Kent engine	Not Held		Not Held	
1990	Brands Hatch	(United Kingdom) Dave Coyne	Swift FB90	Ford Kent engine	Not Held		Not Held	
1991	Brands Hatch	(Belgium) Marc Goossens	Van Diemen RF91	Ford Kent engine	Not Held		Not Held	
1992	Brands Hatch	(Denmark) Jan Magnussen *	Van Diemen RF92	Ford Kent engine	Not Held		Not Held	
1993	Brands Hatch	(Australia) Russell Ingall	Van Diemen RF93	Ford Zetec engine	(United Kingdom) Andrew MacAuley	Reynard 92FF	Not Held	
1994	Brands Hatch	(Denmark) Jason Watt	Vector TF94	Ford Zetec engine	(United Kingdom) Gavin Wills	Swift SC92F	Not Held	
1995	Brands Hatch	(United Kingdom) Kevin McGarrity	Van Diemen RF95	Ford Zetec engine	(Finland) Topi Serjala	Swift SC95F	Not Held	
1996	Brands Hatch	(Australia) Mark Webber *	Van Diemen RF96	Ford Zetec engine	(United Kingdom) Mark Marchant	Jamun M96	Not Held	
1997	Brands Hatch	(Netherlands) Jacky van der Ende	Van Diemen RF97	Ford Zetec engine	Not Held		Not Held	
1998	Brands Hatch	(United Kingdom) Jenson Button *	Mygale SJ98	Ford Zetec engine	Not Held		Not Held	
1999	Brands Hatch	(Netherlands) Ricardo van der Ende	Van Diemen RF99	Ford Zetec engine	Not Held		Not Held	
2000	Brands Hatch	(United Kingdom) Anthony Davidson *	Mygale SJ00	Ford Zetec engine	Not Held		Not Held	
2001	Brands Hatch	(South Africa) Alan van der Merwe	Mygale SJ01	Ford Zetec engine	Not Held		Not Held	
2002	Brands Hatch	(Belgium) Jan Heylen	Van Diemen RF02	Ford Zetec engine	(United Kingdom) Dave Fricker	Reynard 89FF	Not Held	
2003	Brands Hatch	(United Kingdom) Joey Foster	Van Diemen RF03	Ford Zetec engine	(United Kingdom) Matthew Gilmore	Van Diemen RF92	Not Held	
2004	Brands Hatch	(United Kingdom) Dan Clarke	Van Diemen RF04	Ford Zetec engine	(United Kingdom) Joey Foster	Reynard 89FF	Not Held	
2005	Brands Hatch	(United Kingdom) Duncan Tappy	Mygale SJ04	Ford Zetec engine	(United Kingdom) Gavin Wills	Van Diemen RF00	Not Held	
2006	Brands Hatch	(United Kingdom) Richard Tannahill	Van Diemen RF06	Ford Duratec engine	(Republic of Ireland) Noel Dunne	Van Diemen RF92	Not Held	
2007	Brands Hatch	(United Kingdom) Nick Tandy	Ray GRS07	Ford Duratec engine	(Republic of Ireland) Keith Dempsey	Ray GRS07	Not Held	
2008	Brands Hatch	(United Kingdom) Wayne Boyd	Mygale SJ08	Ford Duratec engine	(United States) Josef Newgarden	Ray GRS08	Not Held	
2009	Brands Hatch	(United Kingdom) Chrissy Palmer	Mygale SJ09	Ford Duratec engine	(United Kingdom) Rory Butcher	Van Diemen RF90	(United Kingdom) Neil Tofts	Mygale SJ04
2010	Brands Hatch	(Denmark) Dennis Lind	Van Diemen LA08	Ford Duratec engine	(Republic of Ireland) Neville Smyth	Ray GRS09	(United Kingdom) Julian Hoskins	Vector TF93
2011	Brands Hatch	(United Kingdom) Scott Malvern	Mygale SJ10	Ford Duratec engine	(United Kingdom) Ivor McCullough	Van Diemen RF00	(United Kingdom) Neil Tofts	Mygale SJ04
2012	Brands Hatch	(Finland) Antti Buri	Mygale SJ11	Ford Duratec engine	(United Kingdom) Ivor McCullough	Van Diemen RF00	(France) Xavier Michel	Van Diemen
Year	Circuit	Overall Festival Winner - Kent			Duratec Festival		Zetec Festival	
Year	Circuit	Driver	Chassis	Engine Builder	Driver	Chassis	Driver	Chassis
2013	Brands Hatch	(Republic of Ireland) Niall Murray	Van Diemen RF99	MCP	(Netherlands) Bart van Os	Mygale SJ10	(United Kingdom) Julian Hoskins	Vector TF93
Year	Circuit	Overall Festival Winner - Kent			Duratec-Zetec Festival			
Year	Circuit	Driver	Chassis	Engine Builder	Driver		Chassis	
2014	Brands Hatch	(United Kingdom) James Raven	Ray GR13/14	Bold	(France) Thomas Craincourt		Mygale Duratec	
Year	Circuit	Overall Festival Winner - Kent			Pre-1990 Winner		Pre-1982 Winner	
Year	Circuit	Driver	Chassis	Engine Builder	Driver	Chassis	Driver	Chassis
2015	Brands Hatch	(United Kingdom) Wayne Boyd	Van Diemen MS13K	Bold	(United Kingdom) Matthew Cowley	Reynard FF88	(United Kingdom) Stuart Kestenbaum	Van Diemen RF79
2016	Brands Hatch	(Republic of Ireland) Niall Murray	Van Diemen RF99	MCP	(Netherlands) Job van Uitert	Van Diemen RF89		
2017	Brands Hatch	(United Kingdom) Joey Foster	Ray GR08	Bold				
2018	Brands Hatch	(United Kingdom) Joshua Smith	Van Diemen JL13	Barnett				
2019	Brands Hatch	(Republic of Ireland) Jonathan Browne	Ray GR18	Bold	(United Kingdom) Alan Davidson	Mondiale M89S		
2020	Brands Hatch	(United Kingdom) Rory Smith	Medina JL18	MCP	(United Kingdom) Peter Daly	Van Diemen RF88		
2021	Brands Hatch	(United Kingdom) Jamie Sharp	Medina JL17	MCP	(United Kingdom) Matt Rivett	Van Diemen RF91		
2022	Brands Hatch	(United States) Max Esterson	Ray GR18	FMS	(United Kingdom) Cameron Jackson	Van Diemen RF90		
2023	Brands Hatch	(United Kingdom) Rory Smith	Medina Sport JL18	MCP	(United Kingdom) Richard Higgins	Van Diemen RF91		
2024	Brands Hatch	(United Kingdom) Joshua Smith	Van Diemen JL13	O.R.E.	(United Kingdom) Darwin Smith	Van Diemen RF90		
2025	Brands Hatch	(Republic of Ireland) (Philippines) Jason Smyth	Van Diemen RF00/JL12	Scholar	(United Kingdom) Callum Grant	Van Diemen RF91		

== See also ==
- Formula Ford
- Snetterton Motor Racing Circuit
- Brands Hatch

== Sources ==
- BRSCC Calendar
- Motor Sport Vision (Owners of Brands Hatch)
- Johnny Herbert
- Club Formula Ford
- Historics
