= 1989 Motorcraft Formula Ford Driver to Europe Series =

The 1989 Motorcraft Formula Ford Driver to Europe Series was an Australian motor racing competition open to Formula Ford racing cars. It was the 20th Australian Formula Ford Series.

The series was won by Mark Larkham driving a Van Diemen RF89.

== Calendar ==
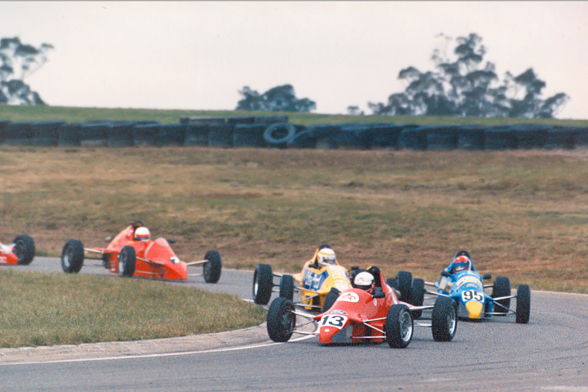
Russell Ingall leads Troy Dunstan, Mark Larkham and Michael Mortimer on his way to winning the Oran Park round.

The series was contested over seven rounds with one race per round.

| Round | Circuit | Date | Round winner | Car |
| 1 | Amaroo Park | 5 March | Mark Larkham | Van Diemen RF89 |
| 2 | Lakeside | 16 April | Mark Larkham | Van Diemen RF89 |
| 3 | Mallala | 7 May | Mark Larkham | Van Diemen RF89 |
| 4 | Sandown | 21 May | Michael Mortimer | Swift FB89 |
| 5 | Winton | 4 June | Russell Ingall | Van Diemen RF89 |
| 6 | Oran Park | 9 July | Russell Ingall | Van Diemen RF89 |
| 7 | Amaroo Park | 6 August | Mark Larkham | Van Diemen RF89 |

== Points system ==
Points were awarded on a 20-15-12-10-8-6-4-3-2-1 basis for the first ten places at each round.

== Series standings ==
| Position | Driver | No. | Car | Entrant | Ama | Lak | Mal | San | Win | Ora | Ama | Total |
| 1 | Mark Larkham | 5 | Van Diemen RF89 | Coffey Ford Motorsport | 20 | 10 | 20 | - | 15 | - | 20 | 85 |
| 2 | Russell Ingall | 13 | Van Diemen RF89 | Russell Ingall | 12 | 5 | 15 | - | 20 | 20 | - | 72 |
| 3 | Michael Mortimer | 7 | Swift FB89 | Belgrave Industries | - | 4 | 12 | 20 | - | 15 | - | 51 |
| 4 | Troy Dunstan | 95 | Van Diemen RF89 | Troy Dunstan | 8 | 6 | 8 | 15 | 8 | - | 1 | 46 |
| 5 | Paul Morris | 94 | Van Diemen RF89 | Paul Morris | 6 | 2 | 6 | 12 | - | 4 | 8 | 38 |
| 6 | Brett Peters | 15 | Swift FB88 & Van Diemen RF89 & Swift FB89 | Brett Peters | 2 | 3 | 2 | 2 | 6 | 10 | 10 | 35 |
| 7 | Glen Zampatti | 12 & 10 | Van Diemen RF86 & RF89 | Phoenix Motorsport | 1 | 1.5 | - | 4 | 10 | 6 | 12 | 34.5 |
| 8 | Peter Salminen | 8 | Swift FB89 | Lithoteam | - | 7.5 | 10 | - | 2 | 12 | - | 31.5 |
| 9 | Michael Dutton | 25 | Van Diemen RF85 | Mercparts | - | 1 | 4 | 3 | 12 | 1 | - | 21 |
| 10 | Russell Becker | 18 | Van Diemen RF86 | | 3 | - | - | - | - | - | 15 | 18 |
| 11 | Paul Stokell | 26 | Elwyn | | 15 | - | - | - | - | - | - | 15 |
| 12 | Andrew Clifford | 22 | Swift FB88 & FB89 | Andrew Clifford | - | 0.5 | 3 | 10 | 1 | - | - | 14.5 |
| 13 | John Vernon | 17 | Van Diemen RF88 | Sommerlad Fasteners Racing | - | - | - | 6 | - | 8 | - | 14 |
| 14 | Garry Jones | 6 | Van Diemen & Swift FB89 | Garry Jones | 10 | - | - | - | - | - | 2 | 12 |
| 15 | Michael Geoghegan | 104 | Van Diemen RF89 | 2 Day FM Australia Racing Pty Ltd | - | - | 1 | - | 3 | - | 6 | 10 |
| 16 | John Blanchard | 38 | Van Diemen RF88 | | - | - | - | - | 4 | 2 | 3 | 9 |
| 17 | Michael Walsh | 21 | Reynard 88FF | Eastern Motorsport | - | - | - | 8 | - | - | - | 8 |
| 18 | Ian Allen | 91 | Lola | | 4 | - | - | - | - | - | - | 4 |
| = | Peter Forster | 31 | Van Diemen RF88 | Peter David Porster | - | - | - | - | - | - | 4 | 4 |
| 20 | Glen Clarke | 91 | Van Diemen RF86 | | - | - | - | - | - | 3 | - | 3 |
| 21 | Stephen Moody | 12 | Van Diemen RF86 | | - | - | - | 1 | - | - | - | 1 |

- 1989 Australian Formula Ford regulations mandated the use of a 1600cc Ford cross flow engine.
- Half points were awarded for the Lakeside round due to the race distance being reduced as a result of scheduling issues.
