= List of Formula Renault cars =

This is a list of cars used in various Formula Renault classes raced in the World Series by Renault and its predecessor Formula Renault and Formula France.

Brand	Chassis	Engine	Year	Applications	Notes
ABC	75	1,6L Renault 12 Gordini R	1975	Formula Renault	
AGS	JH5	1,3L Renault 8	1970	Formula France	
AGS	JH9	1,6L Renault 12 Gordini R	1973	Formula Renault	
AGS	JH11	1,6L Renault 12 Gordini R	1975	Formula Renault	
AGS	JH14	1,6L Renault 12 Gordini R	1979	Formula Renault	
Alpa	FR89	1,7L Renault F2N	1989	Formula Renault	
Alpa	FR90	1,7L Renault F2N	1990	Formula Renault	
Alpa	FR91	1,7L Renault F2N	1991	Formula Renault	
Alpa	FR92	1,7L Renault F2N	1992	Formula Renault	
Alpa	FR93	1,7L Renault F2N	1993	Formula Renault	
Alpa	FR94	1,7L Renault F2N	1994	Formula Renault	
Alpa	FR95	2,0L Renault F3R	1995	Formula Renault	
Alpine	A340	1,3L Renault 8	1968	Formula France	
Alpine	A360	1,3L Renault 8	1969	Formula France	
Alpine	A361	1,3L Renault 8	1970	Formula France	
Alpine	A362	1,3L Renault 8	1971	Formula Renault	
Alpine	A364	1,6L Renault 12 Gordini R	1972	Formula Renault	
Alpine	A364	1,6L Renault 12 Gordini R	1973	Formula Renault	
Alpine	A364	1,6L Renault 12 Gordini R	1975	Formula Renault	
ARC	MF4	1,6L Renault 12 Gordini R	1979	Formula Renault	
Astrel	FR02	1,6L Renault 18	1983	Formula Renault Turbo	
Barazi-Epsilon	FR2.0-10	2,0L Renault F4R 832	2010	Formula Renault 2.0	Spec car used as between 2010 and 2013 only in the Formula Renault 2.0 European and North European Championships, but in the ALPS champion championship and in the other championships, the Tatuus chassis was still in use
BBM	X11	1,6L Renault 12 Gordini R	1975	Formula Renault	
BBM	X14	1,6L Renault 12 Gordini R	1977	Formula Renault	
Coloni	CN1/98	2,0L Nissan SR20	1998	World Series by Renault	Spec car used between 1998 and 2000
Cosna	70	1,3L Renault 8	1968	Formula France	
Cusson	D2	1,3L Renault 8	1971	Formula Renault	
Cusson	Type D	1,6L Renault 12 Gordini R	1975	Formula Renault	
Dallara	SN01	3,5L Nissan VQ30	2002	World Series by Renault	Spec car used between 2002 and 2004
Dallara	WSL3	3,0L AER P14	2002	World Series Lights	Spec car in 2002, 2003 and 2004
Dallara	T05	3,5L Nissan VQ30	2005	World Series by Renault	Spec car used between 2005 and 2007
Dallara	T08	3,5L Nissan VQ35	2008	World Series by Renault	Spec car used between 2008 and 2011
Dallara	T12	3,5L Zytek	2012	World Series by Renault	Spec car as off 2012
Duqueine		1,6L Renault 12 Gordini R	1976	Formula Renault	
Duqueine	VG1	1,6L Renault 12 Gordini R	1977	Formula Renault	
Duqueine	VG6	1,7L Renault F2N	1989	Formula Renault	
Elden	Mk29	1,7L Renault F2N	1989	Formula Renault	2 built
Elden	Mk32	1,7L Renault F2N	1990	Formula Renault	2 built
Elden	Mk34	1,7L Renault F2N	1991	Formula Renault	1 built
Elina	68	1,3L Renault 8	1968	Formula France	
Elina	SS	1,3L Renault 8	1970	Formula France	
Elise	001	1,6L Renault 18	1987	Formula Renault Turbo	
Elise	002	1,6L Renault 18	1988	Formula Renault Turbo	
Ermolli	FR94	1,7L Renault F2N	1994	Formula Renault	
Ermolli	FR95	2,0L Renault F3R	1995	Formula Renault	
Ermolli	FR96	2,0L Renault F3R	1996	Formula Renault	
Ermolli	FR97	2,0L Renault F3R	1997	Formula Renault	
Ermolli	FR98	2,0L Renault F3R	1998	Formula Renault	
Gerca	68	1,3L Renault 8	1968	Formula France	
GRAC	MT5	1,3L Renault 8	1968	Formula France	
GRAC	MT6	1,3L Renault 8	1969	Formula France	
GRAC	MT10	1,3L Renault 8	1970	Formula France	
GRAC	MT30	1,6L Renault 12 Gordini R	1979	Formula Renault	
Griffon	FR-0014	1.6L Renault 12 Gordini Kit FRE	1977	Formula Renault Europe	only one built
Hallton	001FR	2,0L Renault F3R	1996	Formula Renault	
Hampe	8	1,3L Renault 8	1968	Formula France	
Hampe	FR72	1,6L Renault 12 Gordini R	1972	Formula Renault	
Hampe	FR75	1,6L Renault 12 Gordini R	1975	Formula Renault	
Hema	CT01	1,6L Renault 18	1984	Formula Renault Turbo	
Hema	CT02	1,6L Renault 18	1985	Formula Renault Turbo	
Hrubron	T69	1,3L Renault 8	1969	Formula France	
Jefa	FF06	1,3L Renault 8	1970	Formula France	
JPE	377	1,6L Renault 12 Gordini R	1977	Formula Renault	
JPE	378	1,6L Renault 12 Gordini R	1978	Formula Renault	
JPE	381	1,6L Renault 12 Gordini R	1981	Formula Renault	
JSM		1,6L Renault 12 Gordini R	1973	Formula Renault	
JSM	75	1,6L Renault 12 Gordini R	1975	Formula Renault	
Lamoureux	PSR	1,6L Renault 12 Gordini R	1976	Formula Renault	
Lamoureux	PSR3	1,6L Renault 12 Gordini R	1977	Formula Renault	
Le Gallen	LLG9	1,6L Renault 12 Gordini R	1975	Formula Renault	
Le Gallen	LLG10	1,6L Renault 12 Gordini R	1976	Formula Renault	
Le Gallen	LLG12	1,6L Renault 12 Gordini R	1977	Formula Renault	
Le Gallen	LLG15	1,6L Renault 12 Gordini R	1978	Formula Renault	
Lilas	F03	1,7L Renault F2N	1993	Formula Renault	
Lola	T510	1,6L Renault 12 Gordini R	1977	Formula Renault	
Marcadier	AM75	1,6L Renault 12 Gordini R	1975	Formula Renault	
Marcadier	AM76	1,6L Renault 12 Gordini R	1976	Formula Renault	
March	75R	1,6L Renault 12 Gordini R	1975	Formula Renault	8 built
Martini
Martini	MW2	1,3L Renault 8	1969	Formula France	
Martini	MK 4	1,3L Renault 8	1970	Formula France	
Martini	MK 6	1,3L Renault 8	1971	Formula Renault	
Martini	MK 8	1,6L Renault 12 Gordini R	1972	Formula Renault	
Martini	MK 11	1,6L Renault 12 Gordini R	1973	Formula Renault	
Martini	MK 14	1,6L Renault 12 Gordini R	1974	Formula Renault	
Martini	MK 15N	1,6L Renault 12 Gordini R	1975	Formula Renault	
Martini	MK 15E	1,6L Renault 12 Gordini R	1976	Formula Renault Europe	
Martini	MK 17	1,6L Renault 12 Gordini R	1976	Formula Renault	
Martini	MK 18	1,6L Renault 12 Gordini R	1976	Formula Renault Europe	
Martini	MK 20N	1,6L Renault 12 Gordini R	1977	Formula Renault	
Martini	MK 20E	1,6L Renault 12 Gordini R	1976	Formula Renault Europe	
Martini	MK 24	1,6L Renault 12 Gordini R	1978	Formula Renault	
Martini	MK 26	1,6L Renault 12 Gordini R	1979	Formula Renault	
Martini	MK 30	1,6L Renault 12 Gordini R	1980	Formula Renault	
Martini	Mk. 33	1,6L Renault 12 Gordini R	1981	Formula Renault	
Martini	MK 36	1,6L Renault 18	1982	Formula Renault Turbo	
Martini	MK 38	1,6L Renault 18	1983	Formula Renault Turbo	
Martini	MK 41	1,6L Renault 18	1984	Formula Renault Turbo	
Martini	MK 44	1,6L Renault 18	1985	Formula Renault Turbo	
Martini	MK 48	1,6L Renault 18	1986	Formula Renault Turbo	
Martini	MK 51	1,6L Renault 18	1987	Formula Renault Turbo	
Martini	MK 54	1,6L Renault 18	1988	Formula Renault Turbo	
Martini	MK 57	1,7L Renault F2N	1989	Formula Renault	
Martini	MK 59	1,7L Renault F2N	1990	Formula Renault	
Martini	MK 61	1,7L Renault F2N	1991	Formula Renault	
Martini	MK 63	1,7L Renault F2N	1992	Formula Renault	
Martini	MK 65	1,7L Renault F2N	1993	Formula Renault	
Martini	MK 71	2,0L Renault F3R	1995	Formula Renault	
Martini	MK 72	2,0L Renault F3R	1996	Formula Renault	
Martini	MK 76	2,0L Renault F3R	1997	Formula Renault	
Martini	MK 78	2,0L Renault F3R	1998	Formula Renault	
Merlin	MP89	1,7L Renault F2N	1989	Formula Renault	
Micoud	MN01	1,6L Renault 18	1985	Formula Renault Turbo	
Mousquetaire	AM2	1,6L Renault 18	1986	Formula Renault Turbo	
Mygale	FR95	2,0L Renault F3R	1995	Formula Renault	
Mygale	FR96	2,0L Renault F3R	1996	Formula Renault	
Mygale	FR97	2,0L Renault F3R	1997	Formula Renault	
Mygale	FR98	2,0L Renault F3R	1998	Formula Renault	
Mygale	FR99	2,0L Renault F3R	1999	Formula Renault	
Mygale	Formula Campus	1,6L Renault K4M	2000	Formula Renault Campus	
Narval	JC2	1,6L Renault 12 Gordini R	1972	Formula Renault	
Orion	FR81	1,6L Renault 12 Gordini R	1981	Formula Renault	
Orion	FR82	1,6L Renault 18	1982	Formula Renault Turbo	
Orion	FR83	1,6L Renault 18	1983	Formula Renault Turbo	
Orion	FR84	1,6L Renault 18	1984	Formula Renault Turbo	
Orion	FR85	1,6L Renault 18	1985	Formula Renault Turbo	
Orion	FR86	1,6L Renault 18	1986	Formula Renault Turbo	
Orion	FR88	1,6L Renault 18	1988	Formula Renault Turbo	
Orion	FR89	1,7L Renault F2N	1989	Formula Renault	
Orion	FR90	1,7L Renault F2N	1990	Formula Renault	
Orion	FR91	1,7L Renault F2N	1991	Formula Renault	
Orion	FR92	1,7L Renault F2N	1992	Formula Renault	
Orion	FR93	1,7L Renault F2N	1993	Formula Renault	
Pygmée	FF/68	1,3L Renault 8	1968	Formula Renault	
Pygmée	MDB14	1,3L Renault 8	1969	Formula France	
Races-GD	111	1,6L Renault 12 Gordini R	1975	Formula Renault	
Ray	95	2,0L Renault F3R	1995	Formula Renault	
Reynard	89FREN	1,7L Renault F2N	1989	Formula Renault	5 built, in conjunction with Fulmar Competition Services
Reynard	90FREN	1,7L Renault F2N	1990	Formula Renault	6 built, in conjunction with Fulmar Competition Services
Reynard	91FREN	1,7L Renault F2N	1991	Formula Renault	3 built, in conjunction with Fulmar Competition Services
Sarta	M584	1,7L Renault F2N	1990	Formula Renault	
Selex	ST 4	1,6L Renault 12 Gordini R	1973	Formula Renault	
Serem	V89	1,7L Renault F2N	1989	Formula Renault	
Signatech		1,6L Renault K4M	2008	Formula Renault 1.6	Spec car since 2008
Solution F	CM10	1,7L Renault F2N	1989	Formula Renault	
Stryx	BD96	2,0L Renault F3R	1996	Formula Renault	
Swift	FR89	1,7L Renault F2N	1989	Formula Renault	
Swift	FR90	1,7L Renault F2N	1990	Formula Renault	
Swift	FR91	1,7L Renault F2N	1991	Formula Renault	
Swift	FR92	1,7L Renault F2N	1992	Formula Renault	
Swift	FR93	1,7L Renault F2N	1993	Formula Renault	
Swift	FR94	1,7L Renault F2N	1994	Formula Renault	
Swift	FR95	2,0L Renault F3R	1995	Formula Renault	
Tatuus	RC95	2,0L Renault F3R	1995	Formula Renault	
Tatuus	RC96	2,0L Renault F3R	1996	Formula Renault	
Tatuus	RC97	2,0L Renault F3R	1997	Formula Renault	
Tatuus	RC98	2,0L Renault F3R	1998	Formula Renault	
Tatuus	RC99	2,0L Renault F3R	1999	Formula Renault	
Tatuus	FR2000	2,0L Renault F4R 832	2000	Formula Renault 2.0	Spec car used between 2000 and 2007, 850 built
Tatuus	FR1600	1,6L Renault K4M	2002	Formula Renault 1.6	Spec car used between 2002 and 2007, 130 built
Tatuus	FRV6	3,5L Renault V4Y RS	2003	Formula Renault V6	Spec car in the Eurocup (2003-2004) and Asian championship (2006-2009), 30 built
Tatuus	FR2.0-13	2,0L Renault F4R 832	2013	Formula Renault 2.0	Spec car used as of 2013
Tecno	FP 100	1,3L Renault 8	1970	Formula France	
Tecno	FP 120	1,3L Renault 8	1971	Formula Renault	
Van Diemen	FR89	1,7L Renault F2N	1989	Formula Renault	
Van Diemen	FR90	1,7L Renault F2N	1990	Formula Renault	
Van Diemen	FR91	1,7L Renault F2N	1991	Formula Renault	
Van Diemen	FR92	1,7L Renault F2N	1992	Formula Renault	
Van Diemen	FR93	1,7L Renault F2N	1993	Formula Renault	
Van Diemen	FR94	1,7L Renault F2N	1994	Formula Renault	
Van Diemen	FR95	2,0L Renault F3R	1995	Formula Renault	
Van Diemen	FR96	2,0L Renault F3R	1996	Formula Renault	
Venturin	V840	1,6L Renault 18	1986	Formula Renault Turbo	
