= 1992 Motorcraft Formula Ford Driver to Europe Series =

The 1992 Motorcraft Formula Ford Driver to Europe Series was an Australian motor racing competition for Formula Ford racing cars. It was the 23rd Australian national series for Formula Fords.

The series was won by Cameron McConville driving a Van Diemen RF92.

== Schedule ==
The series was contested over eight rounds with one race per round.

| Round | Circuit | Date | Winning driver | Winning car |
| 1 | Amaroo Park | 23 February | Stephen White | Swift SC92F |
| 2 | Symmons Plains | 15 March | John Blanchard | Swift SC92F |
| 3 | Winton | 5 April | John Blanchard | Swift SC92F |
| 4 | Lakeside | 3 May | Cameron McConville | Van Diemen RF92 |
| 5 | Mallala | 31 May | Michael Dutton | Swift SC92F |
| 6 | Wanneroo | 7 June | Cameron McConville | Van Diemen RF92 |
| 7 | Oran Park | 21 June | Cameron McConville | Van Diemen RF92 |
| 8 | Eastern Creek | 3 August | Cameron McConville | Van Diemen RF92 |

== Points system ==
Series points were awarded on a 20-15-12-10-8-6-4-3-2-1 basis for the first ten places at each round.

== Series standings ==
Championship points were awarded at each race on the following basis:

| Position | 1st | 2nd | 3rd | 4th | 5th | 6th | 7th | 8th | 9th | 10th |
|---|---|---|---|---|---|---|---|---|---|---|
| Points | 20 | 16 | 14 | 12 | 10 | 8 | 6 | 4 | 2 | 1 |

| Pos | Driver | No. | Car | Entrant | (New South Wales) AMA | (Tasmania) SYM | (Victoria (state)) WIN | (Queensland) LAK | (South Australia) MAL | (Victoria (state)) WAN | (New South Wales) ORA | (New South Wales) EAS | Pts |
|---|---|---|---|---|---|---|---|---|---|---|---|---|---|
| 1 | (Australia) Cameron McConville | 8 | Van Diemen RF92 | Anderson Consulting | 12 | 12 | 12 | 20 | 15 | 20 | 20 | 20 | 131 |
| 2 | (Australia) John Blanchard | 2 | Swift SC92F | Palm Air Racing | - | 20 | 20 | 12 | 12 | 12 | 10 | 12 | 98 |
| 3 | (Australia) Michael Dutton | 6 | Swift SC92F | Michael Dutton | - | 15 | 15 | 15 | 20 | 15 | - | 8 | 88 |
| 4 | (Australia) Stephen White | 15 | Swift SC92F | Clipsal | 20 | 4 | 8 | 10 | 10 | 6 | - | 4 | 62 |
| 5 | (Australia) Craig Lowndes | 16 | Van Diemen RF85; Reynard FF89 | Northern Tuning Service | 15 | - | 3 | 8 | 3 | 3 | 12 | 6 | 50 |
| 6 | (Australia) Ron Searle | 7 | Van Diemen RF91 | Eastern Creek Raceway | - | 8 | 4 | 6 | 8 | 8 | - | 15 | 49 |
| 7 | (New Zealand) Steven Richards | 31 | Van Diemen RF91 | Steven Richards | 1 | 6 | 6 | - | 6 | - | 15 | 10 | 44 |
| 8 | (New Zealand) Garry Croft | | Swift SC92F | | 10 | 10 | - | - | - | - | - | - | 20 |
| 9 | (Australia) Garry Gosatti | 17 | Van Diemen RF91 | Eastern Creek Raceway | - | - | - | - | 1 | 10 | 6 | - | 17 |
| 10 | (Australia) Gavin Monaghan | | Van Diemen RF91 | | 2 | - | - | 3 | - | - | 8 | 1 | 14 |
| 11 | (Australia) Scott Rowe | 51 | Swift FB91F | Palm Air Racing | 4 | 3 | 1 | - | - | - | 4 | - | 12 |
| 12 | (Australia) Adrian Mastronardo | | Swift SB91F | | - | - | 10 | - | - | - | 1 | - | 11 |
| 13 | (Australia) Cameron Partington | 70 | Van Diemen RF91 | Shell Agriculture Racing | 8 | - | - | 2 | - | - | - | - | 10 |
| 14 | (Australia) Darren Edwards | 38 | Van Diemen RF91 | Darren Edwards | - | - | 2 | - | 4 | - | - | 3 | 9 |
| 15 | (Australia) Steven Ellery | 64 | Van Diemen RF91 | Chelgrave Racing | 6 | - | - | - | - | - | - | - | 6 |
| 16 | (Australia) Clive Peasey | | Van Diemen RF91 | | - | - | - | 4 | - | - | - | - | 4 |
| 16 | (Australia) Mark Noske | 35 | Van Diemen RF91 | Mark Noske | - | - | - | - | - | 4 | - | - | 4 |
| 18 | (Australia) Geoffrey Full | | Reynard FF89 | | 3 | - | - | - | - | - | - | - | 3 |
| 18 | (Australia) Wayne Boatwright | | Van Diemen RF89 | | - | - | - | - | - | - | 3 | - | 3 |
| 18 | (Australia) Tim Wood | 32 | Swift FB89 | TJ Wood | - | - | - | 1 | - | - | - | 2 | 3 |
| 21 | (Australia) Con Toparis | | Reynard FF90 | | - | 2 | - | - | - | - | - | - | 2 |
| 21 | (Australia) Neil Richardson | 41 | Van Diemen RF89 | Neil Richardson | - | - | - | - | 2 | - | - | - | 2 |
| 21 | (Australia) Glen Zampatti | | Van Diemen RF90 | | - | - | - | - | - | 2 | - | - | 2 |
| 21 | (Australia) Leif Corben | | Van Diemen RF90 | | - | - | - | - | - | - | 2 | - | 2 |
| 25 | (Australia) Gerard Manion | | Swift FB89 | | - | 1 | - | - | - | - | - | - | 1 |
| 25 | (Australia) Shaun Walker | | Van Diemen RF90 | | - | - | - | - | - | 1 | - | - | 1 |
| Pos | Driver | No. | Car | Entrant | (New South Wales) AMA | (Tasmania) SYM | (Victoria (state)) WIN | (Queensland) LAK | (South Australia) MAL | (Victoria (state)) WAN | (New South Wales) ORA | (New South Wales) EAS | Pts |

Note: All cars were powered by a 1600cc Ford Kent engine.
