= 1990 Motorcraft Formula Ford Driver to Europe Series =

The 1990 Motorcraft Formula Ford Driver to Europe Series was an Australian motor racing competition open to Formula Ford cars. It was the 21st Australian national series for Formula Fords.

The series was won by Russell Ingall driving a Van Diemen RF90.

== Schedule ==
The series was contested over seven rounds with one race per round.

Round	Circuit	Date	Round winner	Car
1	Amaroo Park	25 February	Russell Ingall	Van Diemen RF90
2	Symmons Plains	11 March	Paul Stokell	Reynard FF89
3	Phillip Island	25 March	Russell Ingall	Van Diemen RF90
4	Winton	8 April	Russell Ingall	Van Diemen RF90
5	Lakeside	6 May	Troy Dunstan	Van Diemen RF89
6	Mallala	10 June	Russell Ingall	Van Diemen RF90
7	Oran Park	15 July	Paul Stokell	Swift FB90

== Points system ==
Series points were awarded on a 20-15-12-10-8-6-4-3-2-1 basis for the first ten positions at each round.

== Series standings ==
Position	Driver	No.	Car	Entrant	Ama	Sym	Phi	Win	Lak	Mal	Ora	Total
1	Russell Ingall	2	Van Diemen RF90	Coffey Ford	20	12	20	20	15	20	-	107
2	Paul Stokell	11	Reynard FF88; Reynard FF89; Swift FB90	Phoenix Motorsport	10	20	15	12	4	-	20	81
3	Paul Morris	5	Van Diemen RF89	Speedtech	12	10	-	3	12	12	8	57
=4	John Blanchard	16	Swift FB89; Swift FB90	Palmair Racing	-	15	-	15	1	4	15	50
=4	Russell Becker	10	Reynard FF89	Transtar Express	-	8	4	10	8	10	10	50
6	Troy Dunstan	4	Van Diemen RF89	Speedtech	6	-	-	8	20	15	-	49
7	Ron Searle	29	Reynard FF89; Reynard FF90	Transtar Express	15	6	3	-	6	6	6	42
8	Brett Peters	6	Swift FB89; Swift FB90	Olympus Cameras	8	-	12	4	10	3	4	41
9	Michael Dutton	9	Van Diemen RF90	Michael Dutton	1	-	-	6	-	8	12	27
10	John Vernon	13	Swift FB89; Swift FB5	Sommerlad Fasterners Racing Team	4	-	8	-	3	2	3	20
11	Michael Mortimer		Swift		-	-	10	-	-	-	-	10
12	Michael Geoghegan	15	Van Diemen RF89	Michael Geoghegan	2	-	6	-	-	-	-	8
=13	Jamie McHugh		Van Diemen RF86		3	1	-	-	-	-	-	4
=13	Glen Zampatti		Reynard	Phoenix Motorsport	-	4	-	-	-	-	-	4
=13	Peter Forster	19	Swift FB90	Peter Forster	-	-	2	-	2	-	-	4
=13	Andrew Reid	92	Van Diemen RF89	Andrew Reid	-	-	1	2	-	1	-	4
=13	David Ratcliff	78	Reynard FF88	Phoenix Motorsport	-	2	-	-	-	-	2	4
18	Sean Turnbull		Van Diemen RF86		-	3	-	-	-	-	-	3
=19	Tim Wood		Van Diemen	Phoenix Motorsport	-	-	-	1	-	-	-	1
=19	Geoff Full		Reynard FF88		-	-	-	-	-	-	1	1
