= 1991 Motorcraft Formula Ford Driver to Europe Series =

The 1991 Motorcraft Formula Ford Driver to Europe Series was an Australian motor racing competition for Formula Ford cars. It was the 22nd Australian national series for Formula Fords.

The series was won by Troy Dunstan driving a Van Diemen RF91.

== Schedule ==
The series was contested over seven rounds with one race per round.

Round	Circuit	Date	Winning driver	Car
1	Sandown Park	24 February	John Blanchard	Swift FB91
2	Symmons Plains	10 March	Troy Dunstan	Van Diemen RF91
3	Lakeside	28 April	Paul Morris	Van Diemen RF91
4	Winton	5 May	Troy Dunstan	Van Diemen RF91
5	Amaroo Park	2 June	Troy Dunstan	Van Diemen RF91
6	Mallala	25 June	Troy Dunstan	Van Diemen RF91
7	Oran Park	11 August	Troy Dunstan	Van Diemen RF91

== Points system ==
Series points were awarded on a 20-15-12-10-8-6-4-3-2-1 basis for the first ten positions at each round.

== Standings ==
Position	Driver	No.	Car	Entrant	San	Sym	Lak	Win	Ama	Mal	Ora	Total
1	Troy Dunstan	6 & 1	Van Diemen RF91	Speedtech	12	20	15	20	20	20	20	127
2	John Blanchard	4	Swift FB91	Palmair Racing	20	10	10	12	10	10	10	82
3	Brett Peters	8	Swift FB91	Olympus Cameras	15	12	12	8	8	12	12	79
4	Andrew Gubb	24	Swift FB90	GB Motorsport	10	15	3	6	12	15	15	76
5	Paul Morris	3	Van Diemen RF91	Speedtech	8	8	20	3	15	-	-	54
6	Michael Dutton	9	Van Diemen RF90	Michael Dutton	-	-	8	10	2	6	2	28
7	Ron Searle	7	Reynard F89	Phoenix Motorsport	4	6	6	-	-	-	8	24
8	Cameron McConville	22	Van Diemen RF91	Anderson Consulting / Ken McConville	-	4	-	15	-	-	-	19
9	Don Griffiths	38	Van Diemen RF89	Phoenix Motorsport	-	1	4	1	-	8	4	18
10	Andrew Reid	16	Swift FB90	Linear Bearings	-	-	1	4	4	-	6	15
11	David Ratcliff	17	Reynard F89	Phoenix Motorsport	2	2	-	-	3	4	-	11
=	Matthew Howard	27	Van Diemen RF86	Phoenix Motorsport	-	-	2	-	6	-	3	11
13	Michael Geoghegan	12	Van Diemen		6	3	-	-	-	-	-	9
14	Paul Mulhearn		Swift		3	-	-	-	-	-	1	4
=	Stephen White	25	Van Diemen RF89	Stephen White	-	-	-	-	1	3	-	4
16	Craig Lowndes		Van Diemen RF85		-	-	-	2	-	-	-	2
=	Garry Gosatti	92	Van Diemen RF90	Garry Gosatti	-	-	-	-	-	2	-	2
18	Luca Duca		Van Diemen		1	-	-	-	-	-	-	1
=	Jamie Larner	83	Van Diemen RF86	Jamie Larner	-	-	-	-	-	1	-	1
