= Formula Ford 1600 =

Auto racing championship

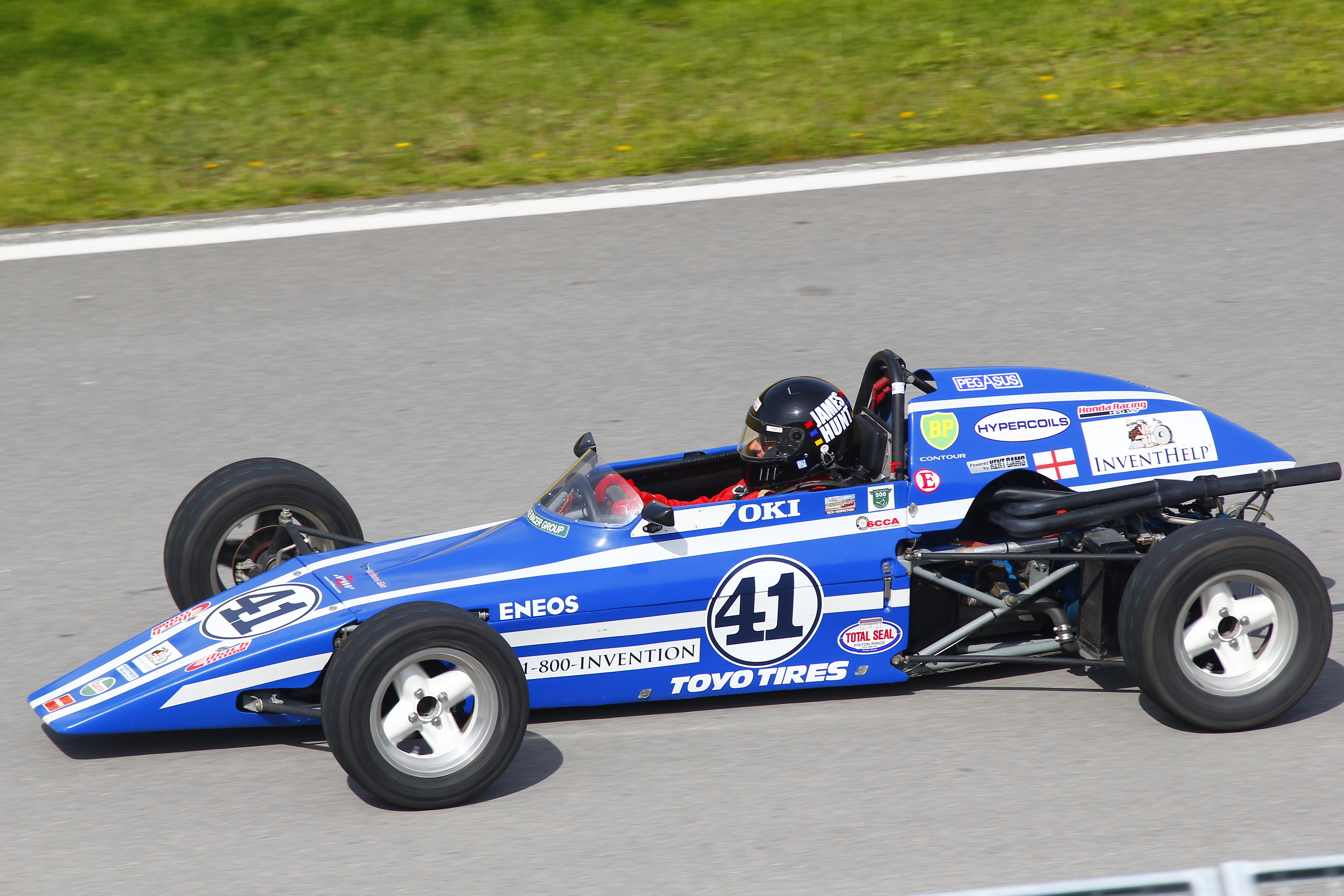
Formula Ford Car

Formula Ford 1600 is a group of auto racing championships for 1600cc Ford Kent powered Formula Ford racing cars. The UK national Formula Ford category disbanded these cars when it adopted the 1800cc Zetec engine in 1993. However, several regional club championships have continued to run.

== Championships ==
=== UK and Ireland ===
Castle Combe is a racing club that includes a Formula 1600 championship. The championship exclusively races at the Castle Combe Circuit in Wiltshire. It is the oldest FF1600 championship in the UK, having started in 1969. In addition to Formula 1600, Castle Combe also has Hot Hatch, GT, and Saloon Car championships. The Castle Combe FF1600 championship features four classes, with the overall winner determined by points, regardless of class distinction.

The Historic Sports Car Club began running the Classic Formula Ford championship in 2020. Before 2019, the championship was run by BARC. The championship consists of two classes, one for cars built before 1974 and one for cars built between 1974 and 1981. It holds races at Snetterton, Silverstone, Donington Park, Brands Hatch, and Croft.

Midlands-South is an amalgamation of the former Star of the Midlands and MotorSport Vision championships. It holds races at Mallory Park, Silverstone, Snetterton, and Brands Hatch. Midlands South has a comparable class structure to Castle Combe; however, their pre-1990 class is divided into three classes: cars constructed between 1985 and 1990, cars constructed before 1985, and cars constructed before 1980.

North West series follows an identical class structure as that of the Midlands South series. The North West series races at Oulton Park in Cheshire and Ty Croes in Anglesey. Due to the number of competitors, races are held for cars constructed before and after 1990, with separate champions being crowned. National championships exist for the Classic championship, which caters to cars manufactured pre-1974 as well as those made between 1974 and 1982. However, the championship is awarded to the driver with the best results in the 1974–1982 class, irrespective of the results of any competitor driving a car built before 1974.

The Northern Irish championship is for cars of any age and races predominantly at Kirkistown, with additional races held at Oulton Park and Mondello Park, in the Republic of Ireland.

The Scottish championship is a championship organized by the Scottish Motor Racing Club that races predominantly at Knockhill but is set to host one race weekend at Croft.

The Irish championship is a championship in Ireland with the bulk of races held at Mondello Park as well as at Kirkistown and Pembrey in Wales. An innovation within this championship is that Class A is intended for the serious championship contender while Class B is for drivers competing solely for their own enjoyment, regardless of the age of their car.

=== North America ===
The Crossflow Cup is another FF1600 series that races at Sonoma Raceway, Laguna Seca, and Road America. The cup began in 2017 and is open to cars built before 1972. The organization also hosts club races for cars built prior to 1981.

The Emerald Cup is also a FF1600 series on the West Coast of the United States that races at Pacific Raceways, Portland International Raceway, The Ridge, Sonoma Raceway, and Laguna Seca. The series is open to all Formula Ford cars, with points scored based on finishing position.

A unique element of Formula Ford 1600 racing is that a pre-1971 car is eligible for every other championship run, meaning the driver of such a car could conceivably race every weekend if desired.

FRCCA (Formula Race Car Club of America) is a series that has raced on the east coast of North America since 1980. Open to all FF1600 and Formula Vee, FRCCA runs alongside EMRA Racing.

== Trophy Events ==
A notable feature of the Formula Ford 1600 calendar is the presence of one-off "Trophy Events." These bring together drivers, regardless of the championship they compete in, for a series of races without any class structure. Notable examples include the Castle Combe Carnival, the Formula Ford Festival at Brands Hatch, the Edwina Overend Memory Trophy at Mallory Park, and the Anglesey Circuit Club's December Trophy. In addition, the BRDC arranges several races, such as the Cheshire Trophy at Oulton Park, the Chris Mudge Memorial Trophy, and a race at Scotland's Knockhill circuit. These races culminate in November's Walter Hayes Trophy at Silverstone which features up to 200 drivers and has included some notable names, such as Neil Cunningham, Danny Watts, Steven Kane, and Joey Foster.

== Constructors ==
Despite the homogeneity of mechanicals, the number of car constructors is vast, including Van Diemen, Swift, Mygale, Reynard, Vector, Crossle, Royale, Hawke, Mallock, Merlyn, Palliser, Macon, Lotus, Elden, Lola, Brabham, Titan, Jamun and Nike.
