= Walter Hayes Trophy =

The Walter Hayes Trophy is a non-championship Formula Ford race. Sanctioned by the Historic Sports Car Club and created by James Beckett, the race has grown into the most prestigious Formula Ford race worldwide. The race is held annually in November at the Silverstone Circuit.

== History ==
The first Walter Hayes Trophy was held at Silverstone between 26 and 28 August 2001 after being created by James Beckett. It is named after Walter Hayes who was a Ford Motor Company public relations executive. As a public relations executive Hayes was very much involved with racing and was instrumental in the creation of the famous Cosworth DFV engine. Hayes died on 26 December 2000, aged 76 and since, his name has carried on in this event.

Neil Fowler won the inaugural race in a classic Lola T200 beating 48 competitors. The 2001 race was the only Trophy held in August as part of the Silverstone Historic Festival in which the race was sanctioned by the BRDC (British Racing Drivers club). From 2002, the race became (and still is) a stand-alone event. The events held between 2002 and 2006 were sanctioned by the BRDC, with this role being taken by the HSCC (Historic Sports Car Club) from 2007. Gavin Wills won the 2002 edition and after that, Joey Foster won three races consecutively in 2003, 2004 and 2005 in a Reynard chassis. He is the most successful competitor after winning the race 4 times, once more in 2022 with Don Hardman Racing in a Firman RFR20 chassis. Four Team USA Scholarship racers have won the race, Conor Daly in 2008, Connor De Phillippi in 2009, Tristan Nunez in 2012 and Max Esterson in 2021. Fellow Team USA Scholarship drivers have finished highly in the event such as Oliver Askew, who finished second in 2016 to Niall Murray.

In 2025 the event celebrated its 25th anniversary. That year Jason Smyth took the win after coming from 13th on the grid following a 10-place grid penalty issued after the first Semi-Final. He battled through the pack beating out the 2025 Porsche Carrera Cup Great Britain champion Andrew Rackstraw and fellow South-African KC Ensor-Smith.

2026 saw 2023 GB4 Championship victor Tom Mills return to the meeting for the first time since 2021 and Mills won his Heat and Semi-Final to secure a front-row start in the Grand Final. He rarely lost the lead in the final and crossed the line first ahead of 2023 winner Chris Middlehurst and 2026 United Formula Ford champion Anthony Amato in third.

== Trophies ==
The Walter Hayes currently awards a number of trophies at the event for a range of achievements.

=== The Janet Cesar Memorial Trophy ===
This award remembers Janet Cesar who was secretary of the Silverstone Racing Club. This Trophy is awarded to the winner of the Pre-1999 Formula Ford race which takes place as a part of the event. It has a Pre-Final on the Saturday which sets the grid for the Final on Sunday.

=== The Carl Hamer Trophy ===
Given to the winner of the Pre-1982 race for Formula Fords, the structure is identical to the Janet Cesar Memorial Trophy with a Pre-Final and Final. It is named in memory of the director of Crompton Lighting Carl Hamer who played a prominent part in British Formula Ford in the 1970s and 1980s.

=== The Neil Cunningham Trophy ===
This trophy is awarded to the highest placed Pre-1999 car in the Grand Final. Awarded in memory of prominent Kiwi driver Neil Cunningham the trophy that is given is the very same one he won in 2005 when he took the chequered flag first in Heat One in a Van Diemen RF78

=== The Bury Mason Trophy ===
Awarded to the winner of Heat One of the event it is given in the name of Bury Mason who was long involved with the meeting and encouraged eventual 4-time champion Joey Foster to do it in 2003.

== Winners ==
=== The Walter Hayes Trophy ===
Year	Driver	Team	Car
2001	(United Kingdom) Neil Fowler	Neil Fowler	Lola T200
2002	(United Kingdom) Gavin Wills	Team West-Tec	Swift SC92
2003	(United Kingdom) Joey Foster	Marque Cars	Reynard 92FF
2004	(United Kingdom) Joey Foster	Marque Cars	Reynard 89FF
2005	(United Kingdom) Joey Foster	Marque Cars	Reynard 89FF
2006	(Republic of Ireland) Peter Dempsey	Cliff Dempsey Racing	Ray GRS06
2007	(Republic of Ireland) Peter Dempsey	Cliff Dempsey Racing	Ray GRS05
2008	(United States) Conor Daly	Cliff Dempsey Racing	Ray GRS07/08
2009	(United States) Connor De Phillippi	Cliff Dempsey Racing	Ray GRS08
2010	(Republic of Ireland) Peter Dempsey	Cliff Dempsey Racing	Ray GRS05
2011	(United Kingdom) Adrian Campfield	Kevin Mills Racing	Spectrum 011C
2012	(United States) Tristan Nunez	Cliff Dempsey Racing	Ray GRS08
2013	(United Kingdom) Scott Malvern	Kevin Mills Racing	Spectrum 011c
2014	(United Kingdom) Wayne Boyd	Medina Motorsport	Van Diemen MS13
2015	(United Kingdom) Graham Carroll	BM Racing	Van Diemen JL13
2016	(Republic of Ireland) Niall Murray	Bernard Dolan Racing	Van Diemen RF99
2017	(United Kingdom) Michael Moyers	Kevin Mills Racing	Spectrum 011C
2018	(United Kingdom) Michael Moyers	Kevin Mills Racing	Spectrum 011C
2019	(Republic of Ireland) Jordan Dempsey	Kevin Mills Racing	Spectrum 011C
2020	(United Kingdom) Oliver White	Souley Motorsport	Van Diemen JL015K
2021	(United States) Max Esterson	Low Dempsey Racing	Ray GR18
2022	(United Kingdom) Joey Foster	Don Hardman Racing	Firman RFR20
2023	(United Kingdom) Chris Middlehurst	Team Dolan	Van Diemen LA10
2024	(United Kingdom) Rory Smith	B-M Racing	Medina Sport JL18
2025	(Republic of Ireland) (Philippines) Jason Smyth	Team Dolan	Van Diemen RF00/JL12
2026	(United Kingdom) Tom Mills	KMR Sport	Spectrum 011c
