= Van Diemen RF88 =

1988 Formula Ford single-seater

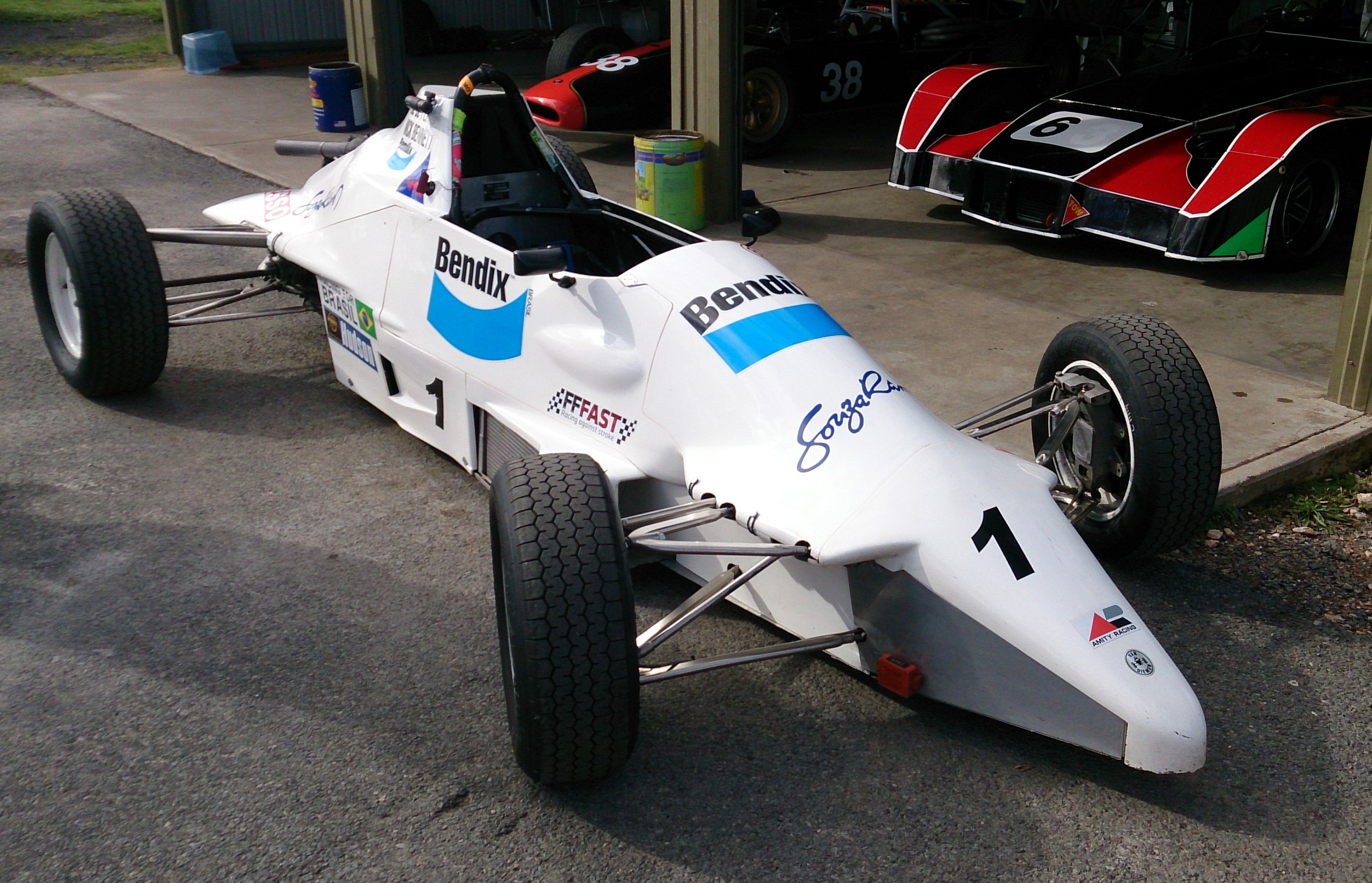
- Category: Formula Ford 1600
- Constructor: Van Diemen

Technical specifications
- Chassis: Steel spaceframe
- Suspension: Double wishbones, coil springs over shock absorbers, anti-roll bars
- Engine: Mid-engine, longitudinally mounted, 1.6 L (97.6 cu in), Ford, SOHC I4, N/A
- Transmission: Hewland LD200 4-speed manual
- Power: ~ 89 hp (66 kW)
- Weight: 440 kg (970 lb)

Competition history

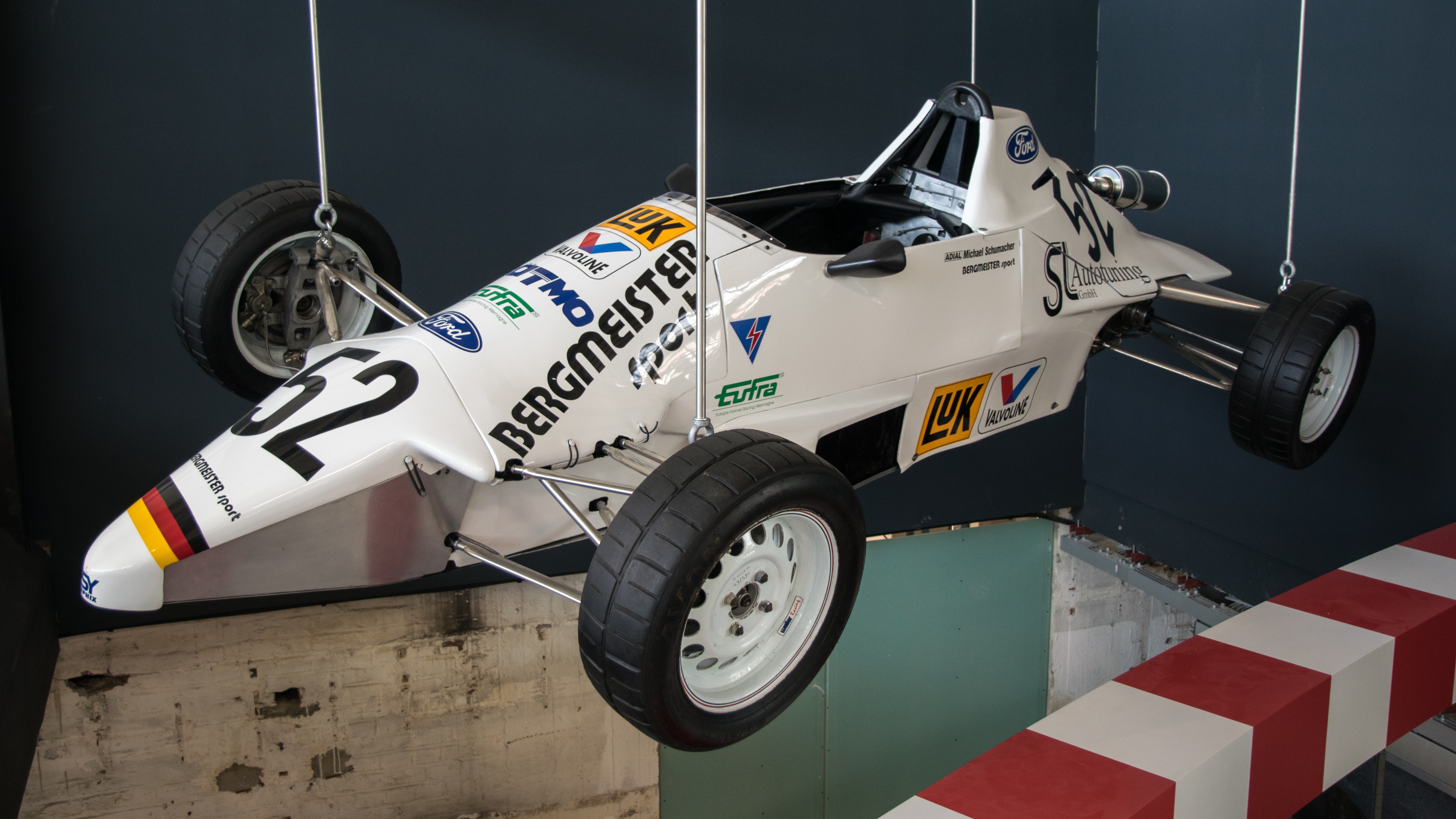
Van Diemen RF88 of Michael Schumacher

The Van Diemen RF88, and its evolution, the RF89, were open-wheel formula race car chassis, designed, developed and built by British manufacturer and race car constructor Van Diemen, for Formula Ford 1600 race categories, in 1988.
