= Neil Cunningham =

Racing and stunt driver (1962–2016)

Neil Cunningham (12 June 1962 – 24 May 2016) was a New Zealand-born racing driver and stunt driver who competed primarily in British and European endurance races along with some roles in television and film. He was active in the British GT Championship and competed at the 24 Hours of Le Mans. As a stunt driver, he featured in Quantum of Solace, a James Bond movie. He was diagnosed with motor neuron disease (MND) in 2010 and died in 2016 while living in Swansea, Wales.

== Driving career ==
=== Racing career ===
Cunningham began racing at the age of ten in Mount Wellington. His family moved to Australia when he was twelve, and he began racing in a Holden Torana. Three years after Cunningham finished as runner-up in the 1980 Queensland Touring Car Championship, Formula One champion Jack Brabham selected Cunningham to race in the British Formula Ford 2000 Championship. In 1993, Cunningham finished fourth in the British Formula Renault Championship.

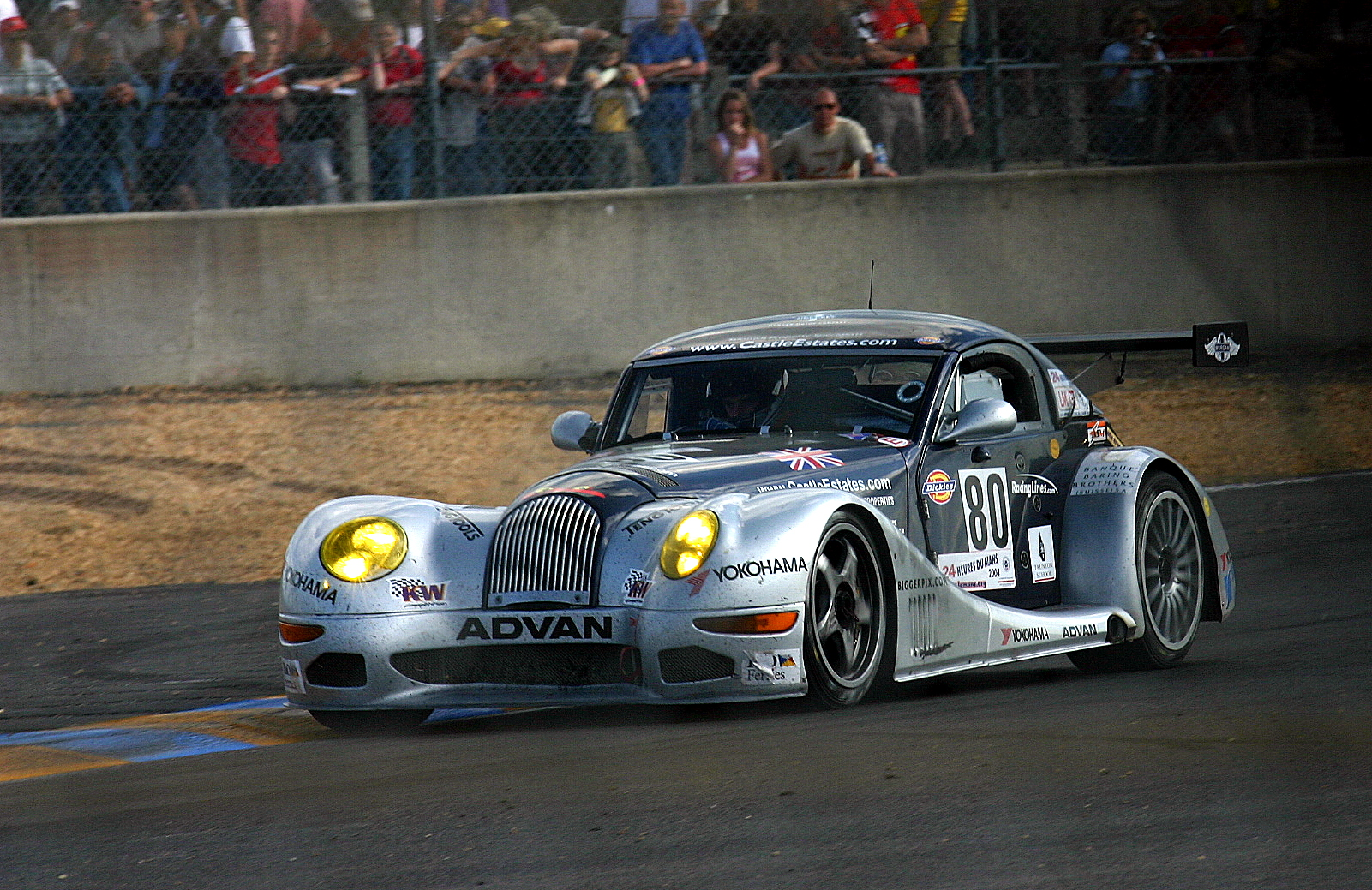
The Morgan Aero 8 GTN driven by Cunningham in his 24 Hours of Le Mans debut in 2004.

After leaving single seater racing, Cunningham won the 1996 British Eurocar V6 Championship and in 1998 he won the British Marcos Mantis Championship. In the 2000s he continued to race in the British GT Championship along with other grand touring and endurance events. His best finish in the series came in 2005, where he finished third in points alongside Ben Collins in a Porsche 911 GT3-RSR. Cunningham made his first 24 Hours of Le Mans appearance in 2004 for the Morgan Works Race Team. He went back to Le Mans two years later, racing a Courage C65 in the LMP2 class. Barazi-Epsilon and Cunningham finished the race 21st overall. Later in his career, Cunningham began participating in historic racing events, winning the Silverstone Classic twice in a Jaguar D-Type. In 2011, during a Le Mans support event, Cunningham won his class in a Jaguar XKD 505 D-Type.

In September 2011, Cunningham participated in his last race driving the same Van Diemen RF90 he raced twenty years ago when he first came to Europe. He reportedly did not have the strength to hold the steering wheel with his left hand.

=== Stunt career ===
Throughout his racing career, Cunningham was known for his car control which was noticed by film and television producers. His largest role as a stunt driver came in 2008 when he doubled for Daniel Craig in the opening scene of Quantum of Solace, the 22nd James Bond movie. The scene involves Bond in a car chase outside of Sienna, Italy.

Cunningham was rumoured to be The Stig, an anonymous character from the British show Top Gear. However, Cunningham denied this, saying "I always had the Stig in my mirror."

== Personal life and death ==
Neil Cunningham was born on 12 June 1962, in Auckland, New Zealand in the Papakura suburb. At the age of 7, Cunningham's parents split, and he moved with his mother to Gold Coast, Australia. His cousin, Blyth Tait, is an Olympic gold medalist in equestrianism.

In 2010, at the age of 47, Cunningham was diagnosed with MND. His diagnosis forced his retirement in which he founded the charity Racing4MND. At the time of his death, the charity had raised over £100,000. Following his death in 2016, the British GT Championship honored Cunningham by branding each car's windscreen with a Racing4MND sticker during the Silverstone 500.
