= Elden Racing Cars =

British firm that designed race cars

Elden Racing Cars was a British motor sport company involved in designing (under the brand of Design Formula), building, and racing cars. Most frequently associated with Formula Ford in the 1970s, the marque also produced Formula Atlantic, Formula 3, Formula 4, Formula Ford 2000 and Formula Renault vehicles, among others. Elden produced more than 38 individual designs from birth to the present day.

The company was founded in 1967 by John Thompson and brothers Peter Hampsheir and Brian Hampsheir.

== Racing cars ==
Year	Racing car	Units produced	Racing series
1961	Briham Mk. 1	None	Sports car
1966	Briham Mk. 2	1	Formula 4 250cc
1967	Briham Mk. 3	1	Formula Ford 1600
1967	Briham Mk. 4	6	Formula 4 250cc
1968	Briham Mk. 5	1	Formula 4 850cc
1968	Elden Mk. 6	4	Formula Ford 1600
1969	Sturgess Mk. 7	3	Formula F100
1970	Elden Mk. 8	48	Formula Ford 1600
1972	Elden Mk. 9	1	Formula 3
1972	Elden Mk. 10	121	Formula Ford 1600
1972	Elden Mk. 12	3	Formula 3
1972	Elden Mk. 14	8	Formula Super Vee
1974	Elden Mk. 11	1	Sports car
1974	Elden Mk. 15	3	Formula 3
1974	Elden Mk. 16	1	Formula Atlantic
1975	Elden Mk. 17	6	Formula Ford 1600
1976	Elden Mk. 18	11	Formula Ford 2000
1977	Elden Mk. 19	1	Formula Ford 1600
1978	Saracen Mk. 20	8	Formula Ford 1600
1978	Saracen Mk. 21	2	Formula Ford 2000
1979	Saracen Mk. 22	1	Formula C
1980	Saracen Mk. 23	4	Sports 2000
1980	Elden Mk. 24	5	Formula Ford 1600
1980	Elden Mk. 25	2	Formula Ford 1600
1982	Elden Mk. 26	Project abandoned	
1988	Elden Mk. 27	2	Formula Ford 1600
1989	Elden Mk. 28	1	Formula Ford 2000
1989	Elden Mk. 29	2	Formula Renault
1989	Elden Mk. 30	1	Formula Ford 1600
1990	Elden Mk. 31	1	Formula Ford 2000
1990	Elden Mk. 32	2	Formula Renault
1991	Elden Mk. 33	1	Sports car
1991	Elden Mk. 34	1	Formula Renault
2000	Elden Mk. 35		
2000	Elden Mk. 36		Sports car
2001	Elden Mk. 37		Sports 2000
