= Crosslé Car Company =

Northern Irish racing car manufacturer

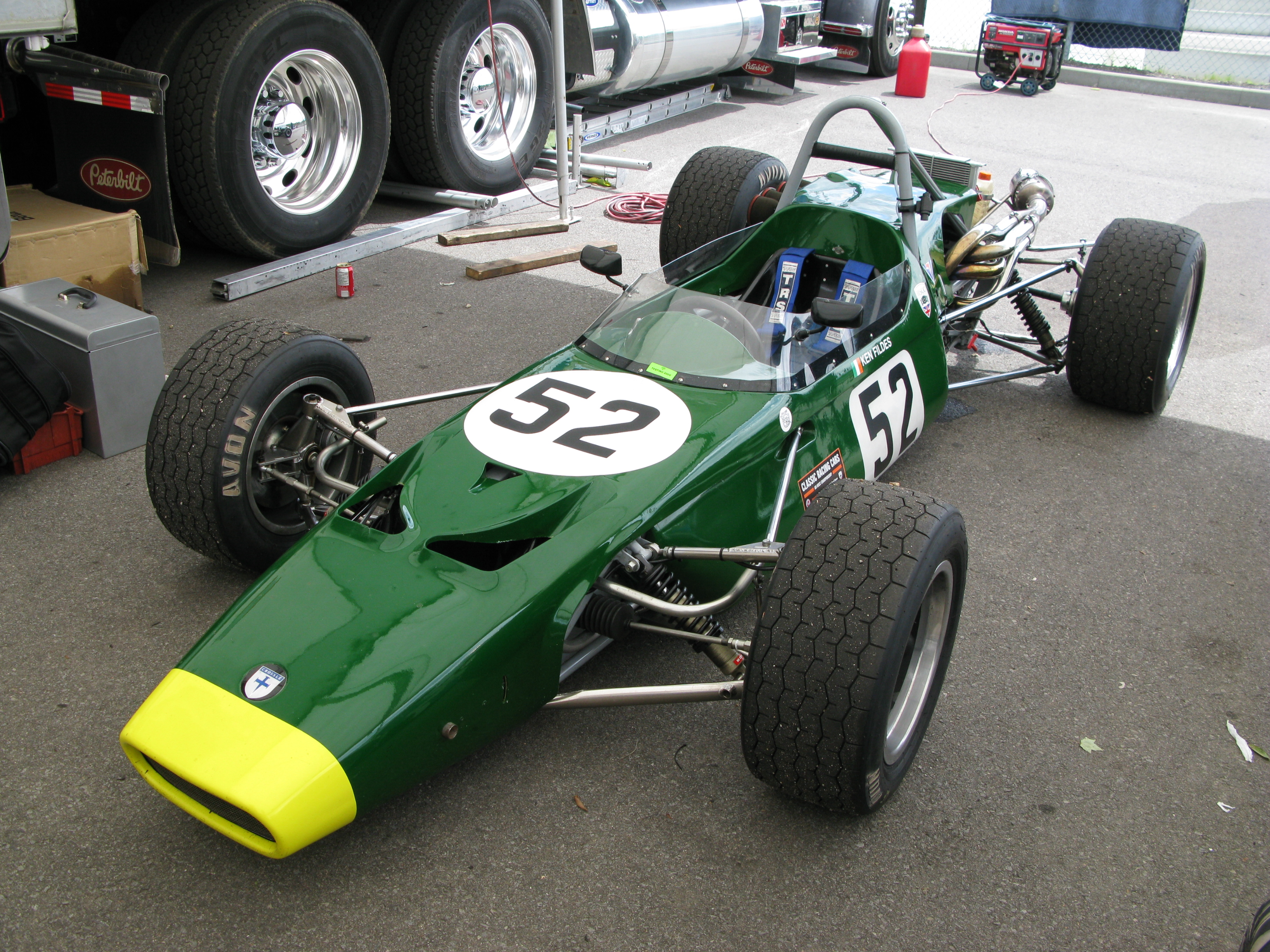
The unique Crosslé 19F Formula Two car.

The Crosslé Car Company Ltd. is a racing car manufacturer based in Holywood, Northern Ireland. Crosslé was founded in 1957 by John Crosslé. Crosslé considered to be one of the oldest surviving specialist racing car manufacturer in the world.

Crosslé is known for its Formula Ford designs, particularly for the FF1600 class, and during the 1970s drivers of Crosslé cars won numerous championships. The company has produced cars for other national and international formulae, including Formula 5000, Formula Two and Formula Junior. It has also produced well-regarded cars for various classes in sports car racing. Many drivers who have since gone on to become household names drove Crosslé cars while in the early stages of their career. Among these are former Formula One drivers Nigel Mansell, John Watson, Eddie Irvine and Martin Donnelly. Former Jordan Grand Prix team owner Eddie Jordan also began his racing career in a Crosslé.

John Crosslé sold the company to Crosslé racer Arnie Black in 1997, who in turn sold it to former oil industry executive Paul McMorran in late 2012.

Dr John Crosslé MBE died on 31 August 2014, aged 82.

== Gallery ==
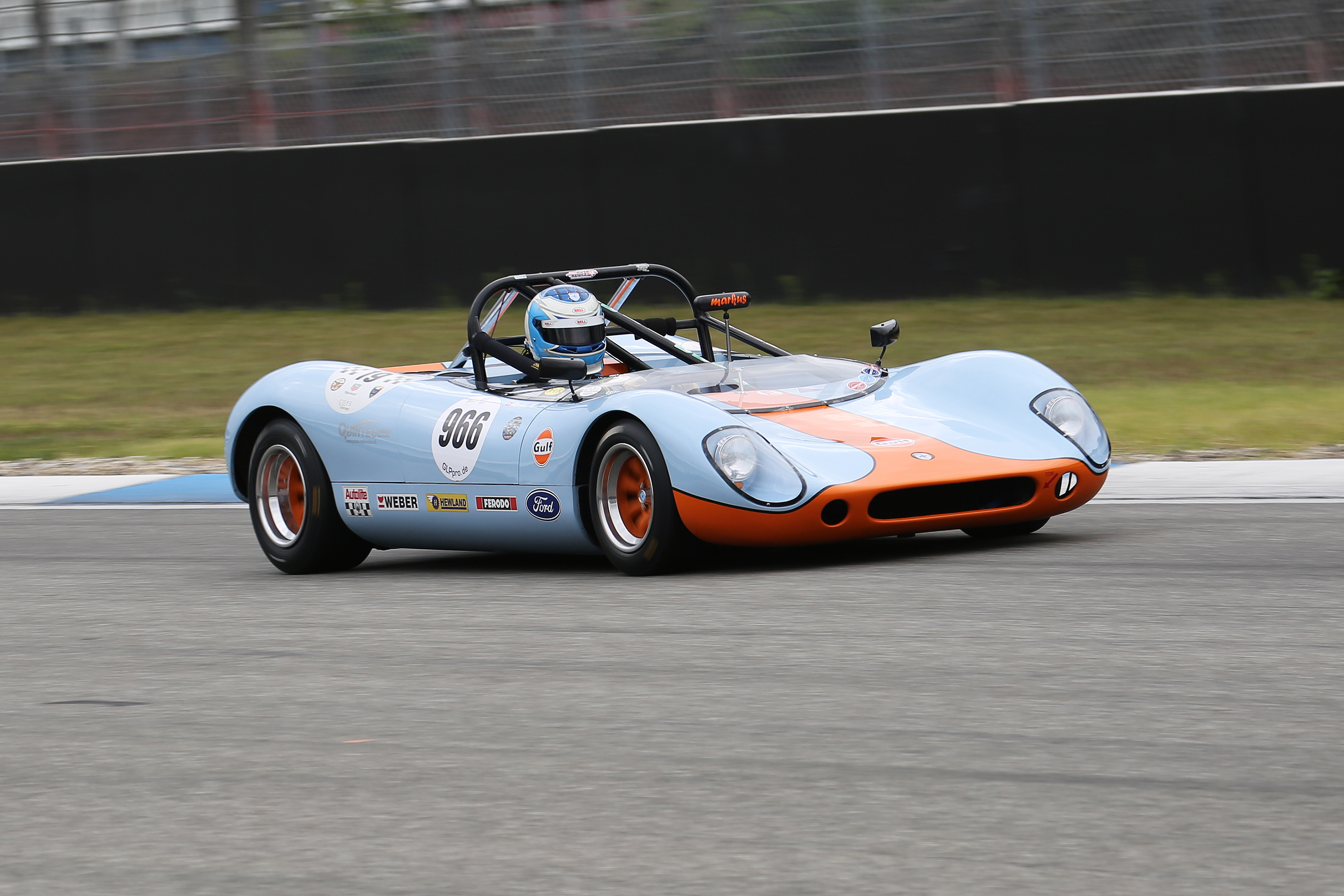
Crosslé 9S at Hockenheim Historic 2021

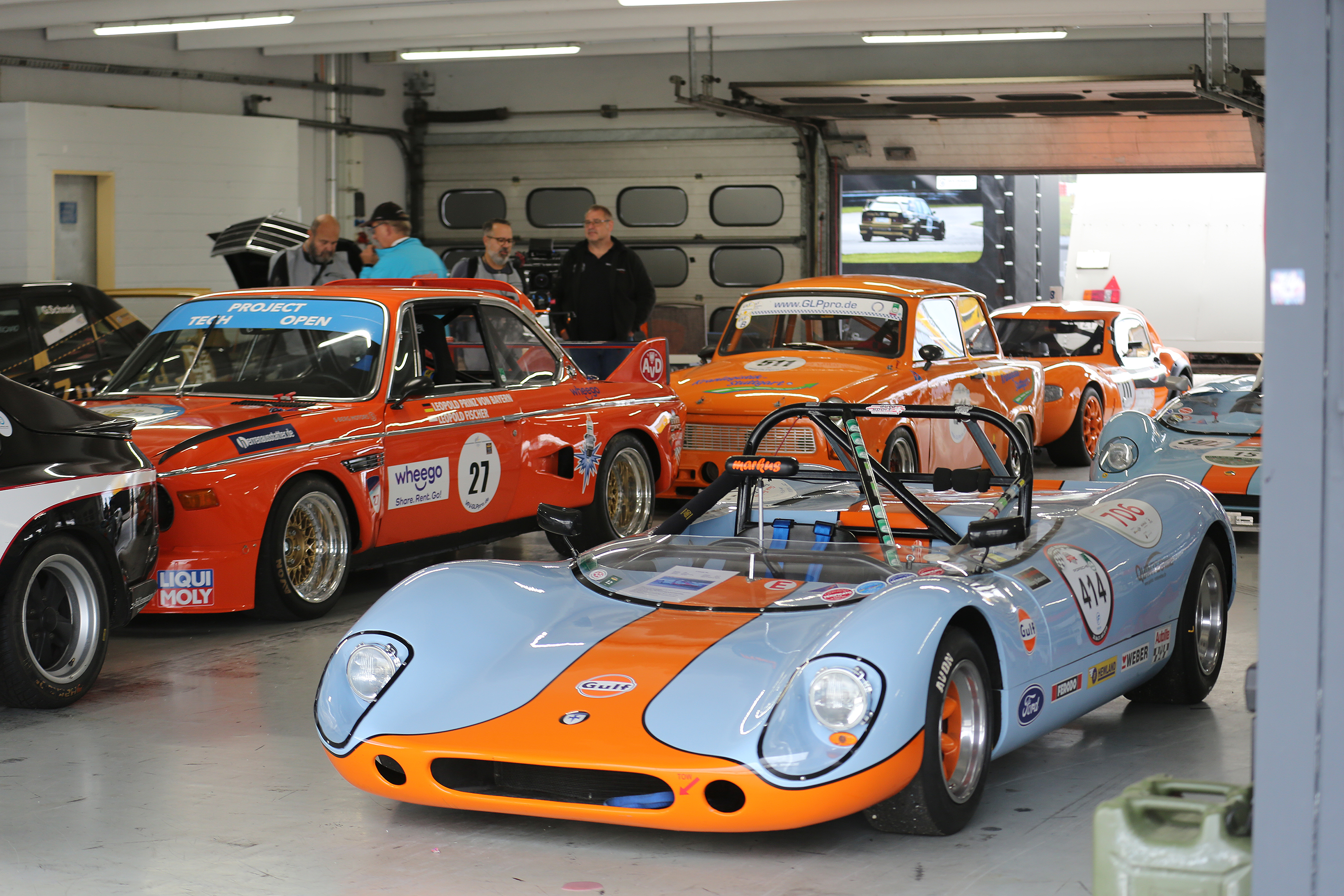
Crosslé 9S at Hockenheim paddock

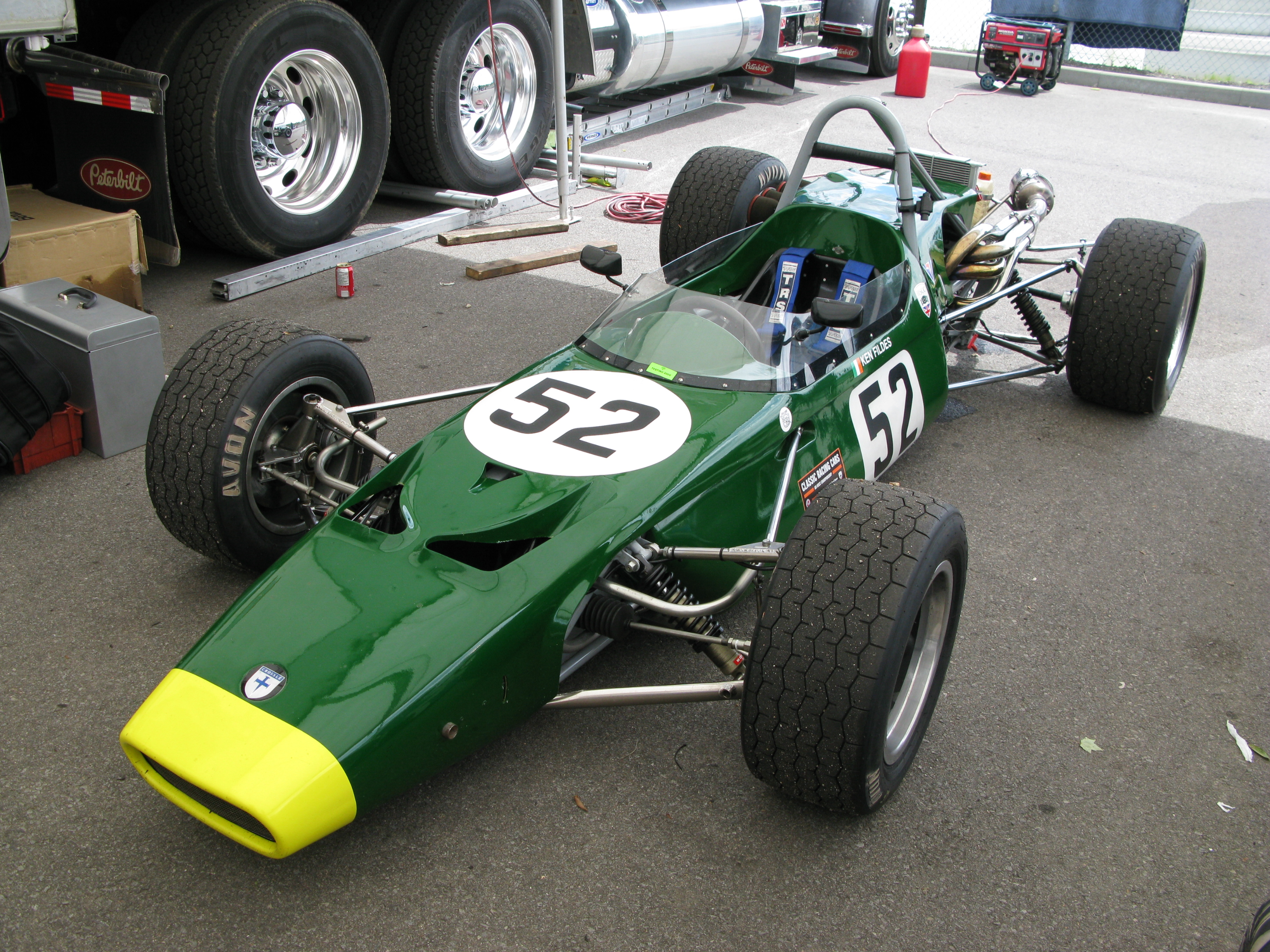
Crosslé 19F at Mont-Tremblant

== See also ==
- Anson Cars
- Lola Cars
- Reynard Motorsport
- Swift Engineering
- Van Diemen
