= Ray Race Cars =

Ray Race Cars is a British race car manufacturer. Previously Ray built Formula 3 and Formula Renault cars. The company still produces Formula Ford cars.

== History ==
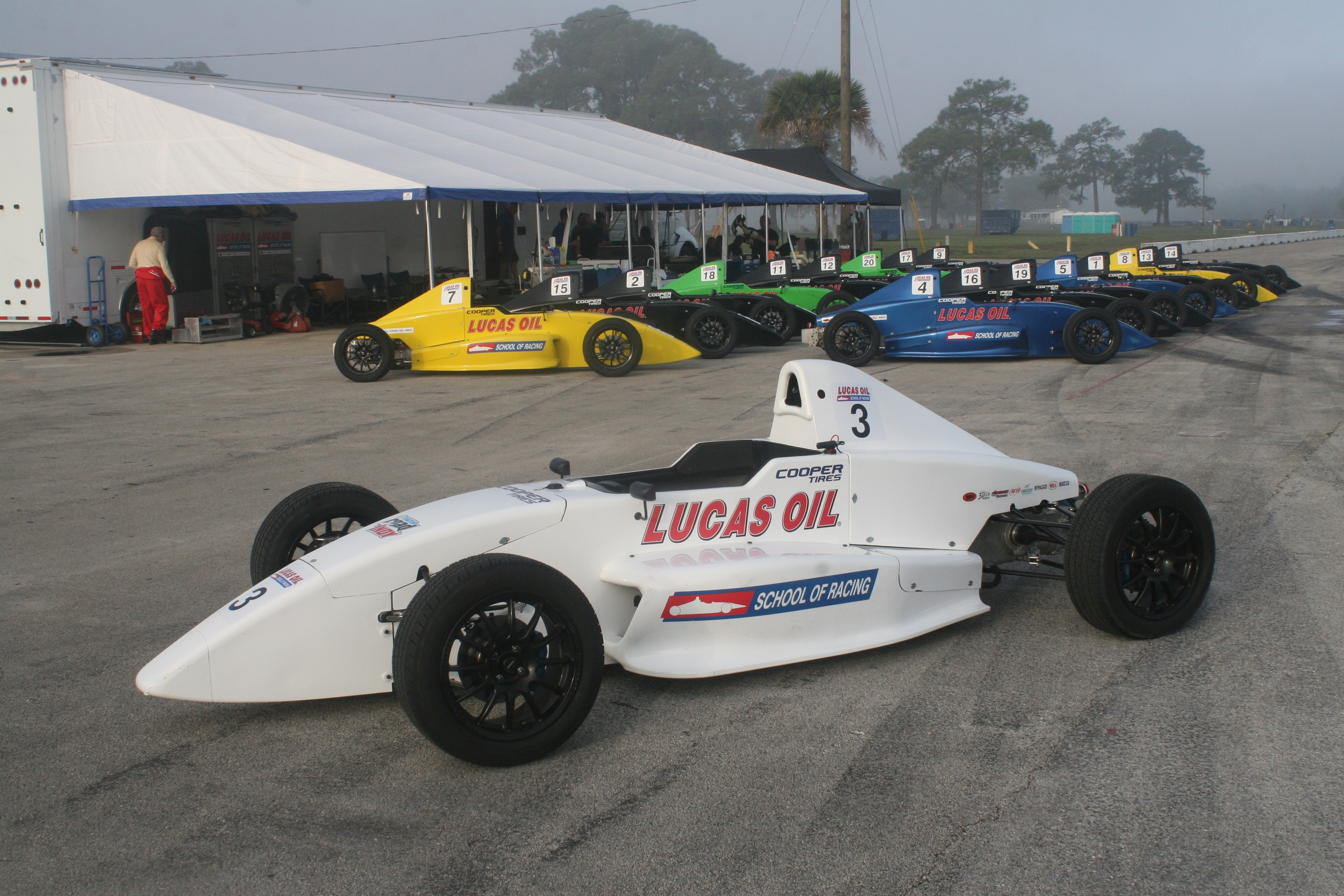
The Ray GR-RSC as raced by the Lucas Oil School of Racing

Ray Race Cars was founded in 1971 by Bert Ray and his brother Frank and his son Gavin. Stephen South raced the Ray 73F entered by the factory team in various British championships winning four races. With the 74F South won eleven races in 1974. For 1975 South and Ray moved up into Formula 3 with the Ray F375. The car was fitted with a Toyota engine. The best result was a fifth place at Brands Hatch in the 1975 British Formula Three season. Later in the season the team switched to the more competitive March 753 scoring a podium at Thruxton. The Ray F376 for 1976 was announced but never built.

In 1987, Derek Higgins won the BARC Formula Ford Junior championship in the 86F. Higgins won races at Thruxton, Silverstone, Mallory Park, Oulton Park, Snetterton and Cadwell Park. The following season Andy Charsley won two races in the championship.

For 2003, the factory team signed Alx Danielsson and Sukhjit Sandher. Danielsson won three races, all three at Brands Hatch. The Swede finished fourth in the championship standings. It took until 2006 before the constructor won another British Formula Ford race. Cliff Dempsey Racing signed Peter Dempsey who won the first four races of the championship. Dempsey also won the Walter Hayes Trophy in 2006 and 2007. Nick Tandy joined the factory team winning three races. The following year Tandy joined family team JTR winning six races in a Ray GRS07. Partnering with the Team USA Scholarship and Cliff Dempsey Racing Ray Race Cars won the Walter Hayes Trophy again in 2008, 2009, 2010 and 2012.

At the 2009 A1GP round at Brands Hatch, Ray Race Cars unveiled the BR09SC Sports 2000. In the 2010, Sports 2000 Duratec championship Damian Griffin raced the Ray car. His best finish was seventh at Rockingham. The car struggled to be competitive in following years.

Scott Malvern was the last driver winning races in the official British Formula Ford championship for Ray Race Cars. In 2010. Malvern won at Oulton Park and Silverstone. For 2011 Ray introduced the GR11. The Lucas Oil School of Racing adopted the car as the car to teach aspiring race drivers. The car was fitted with a 2-liter Elite Engines built engine. Continuing in the local Formula Ford championships James Raven won the Formula Ford Festival in 2014.

Alex Crosbie, driving a GR21, won the New Zealand Formula Ford Championship in April 2022.

== Racing cars ==
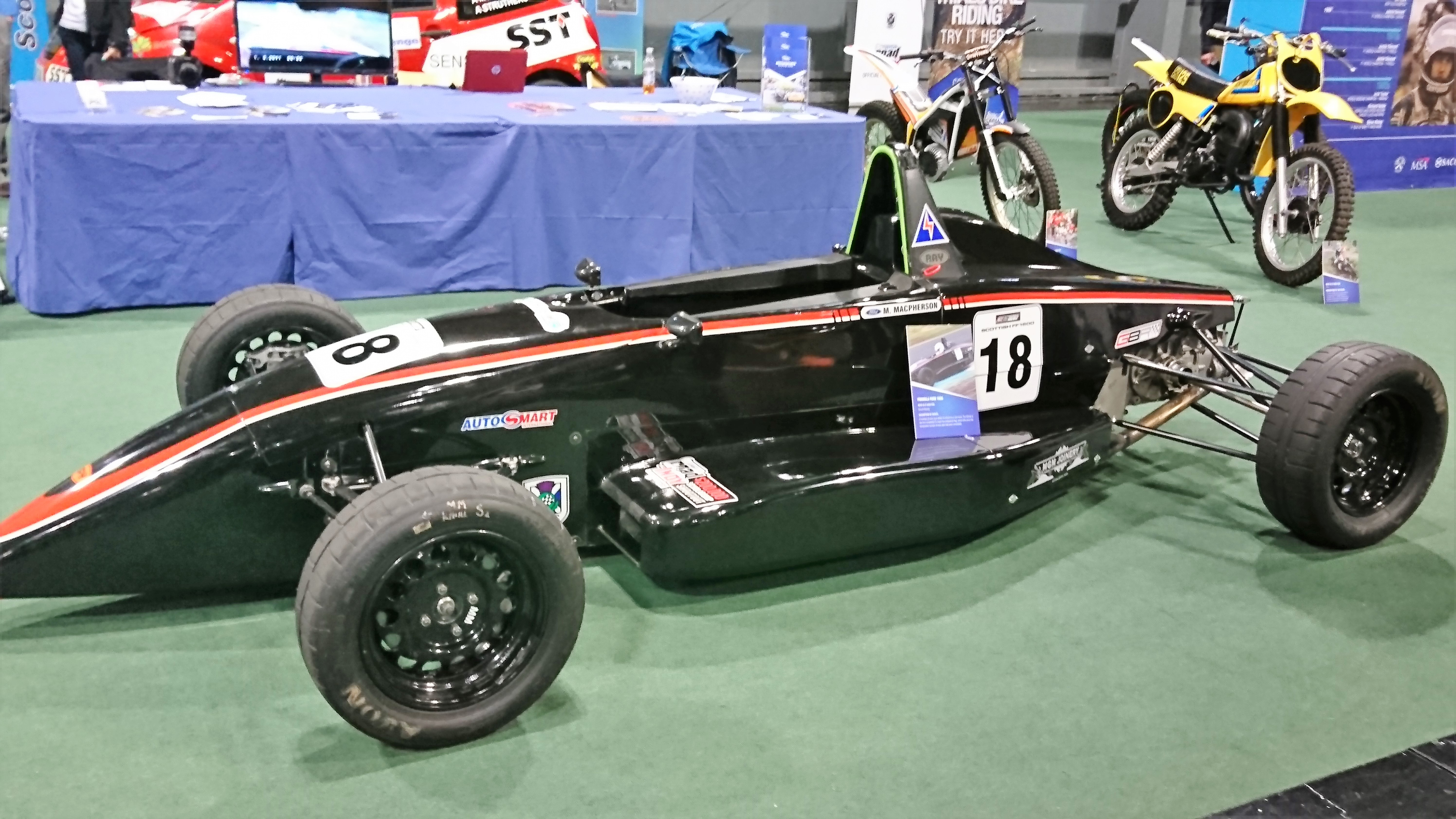
A Ray GR14 car used to compete in the Scottish Formula Ford Championship.

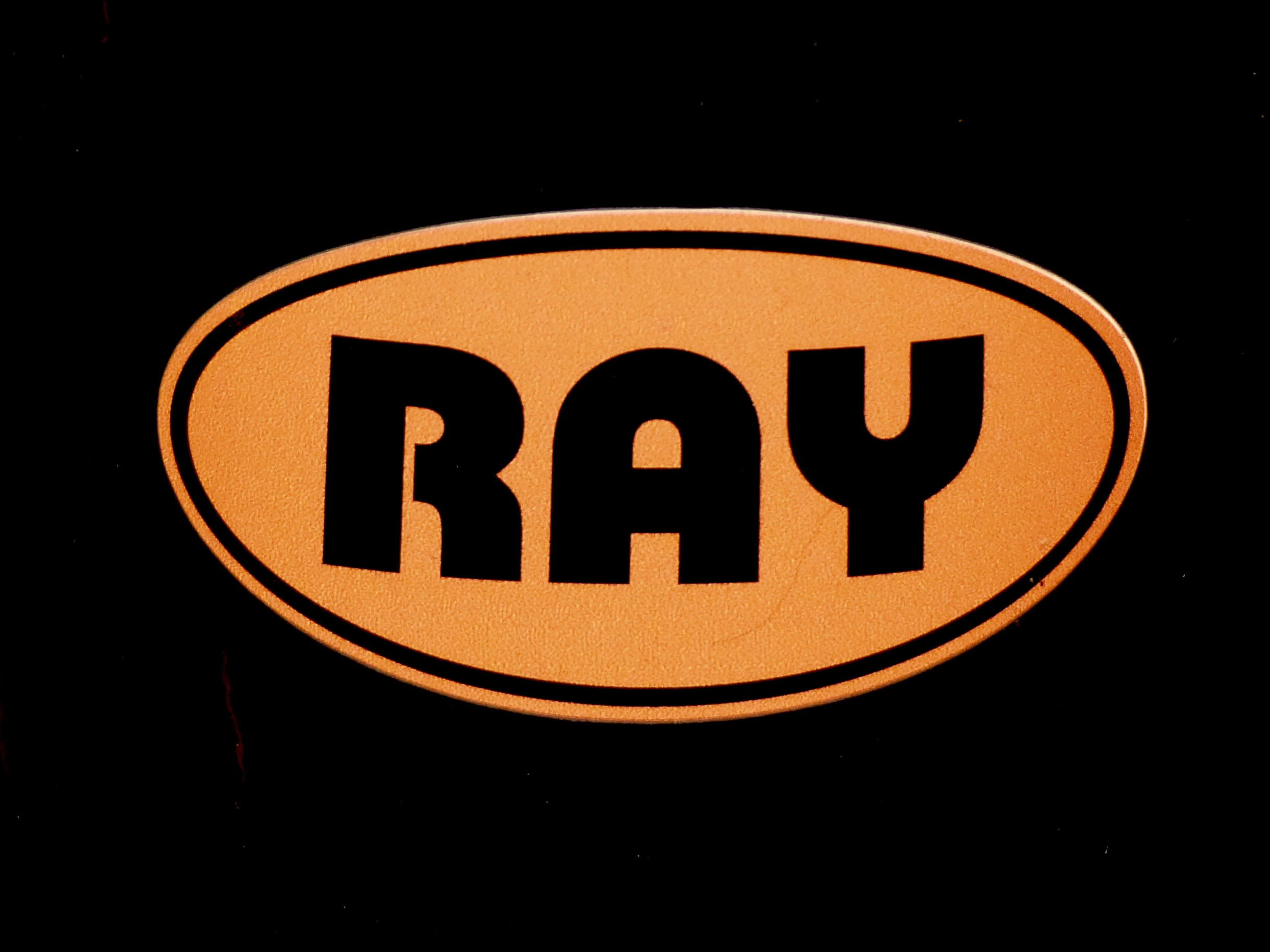
Logo of Ray Race Cars, as seen on the GR16 Formula Ford car, Race Retro, Stoneleigh, Warwicks, 2017

Year	Car	Class
1971	Ray 71F	Formula Ford
1972	Ray 72F	Formula Ford
1973	Ray 73F	Formula Ford
1974	Ray 74F	Formula Ford
1975	Ray F375	Formula 3
1976	Ray FF276	Formula Ford 2000
1976	Ray FA76	Formula Atlantic
1977	Ray FF2 77	Formula Ford 2000
1978	Ray 78F	Formula Ford
1978	Ray 78SF	Formula Ford 2000
1980	Ray 80F	Formula Ford
1981	Ray 81F	Formula Ford
1982	Ray 82F	Formula Ford
1983	Ray 83F	Formula Ford
1984	Ray 84F	Formula Ford
1984	Ray 84SF	Formula Ford 2000
1985	Ray 85F	Formula Ford
1985	Ray 85SF	Formula Ford 2000
1986	Ray 86F	Formula Ford
1987	Ray 87F	Formula Ford
1988	Ray 88F	Formula Ford
1989	Ray 89	Formula Renault
1989	Ray Vee 1	Formula Vee
1991	Ray 91	Formula Renault
1992	Ray 92F	Formula Ford
1994	Ray 94FZ	Formula Ford
1995	Ray 95	Formula Renault
2003	Ray GRS03	Formula Ford
2005	Ray GRS05	Formula Ford
2006	Ray GRS06	Formula Ford
2007	Ray GRS07	Formula Ford
2008	Ray GRS08	Formula Ford
2009	Ray GRS09	Formula Ford
2009	Ray BR09SC	Sports 2000
2010	Ray GR10	Formula Ford
2011	Ray GR11	Formula Ford
2013	Ray GR13	Formula Ford
2017	Ray GR17	Formula Ford
2018	Ray GR18	Formula Ford
2019	Ray GR19	Formula Ford
2020	Ray GR20	Formula Ford
2021	Ray GR21	Formula Ford
2022	Ray GR22	Formula Ford
