= Van Diemen RF90 =

- Category: Formula Ford 1600
- Constructor: Van Diemen

Technical specifications
- Chassis: Steel spaceframe
- Suspension: Double wishbones, coil springs over shock absorbers, anti-roll bars
- Engine: Mid-engine, longitudinally mounted, 1.6 L (97.6 cu in), Ford, OHV I4, N/A
- Transmission: Hewland LD200 4-speed manual
- Power: 115 hp (86 kW) @ 6000 rpm
- Weight: 420 kg (930 lb)
- Brakes: Disc brakes
- Tyres: Dunlop

Competition history

The Van Diemen RF90, and its evolutions, the RF91 and the RF92, were open-wheel formula race car chassis, designed, developed and built by British manufacturer and race car constructor Van Diemen, for Formula Ford 1600 race categories, between 1990 and 1992.
