= Formula Ford =

Race car class

- Category: Open wheel racing
- Country: Worldwide
- Constructors: Various
- Engine suppliers: Ford; Honda (U.S. & Canada only)
- Tire suppliers: Continental AG; Cooper Tire; Hoosier Racing Tire; Nova Motorsport

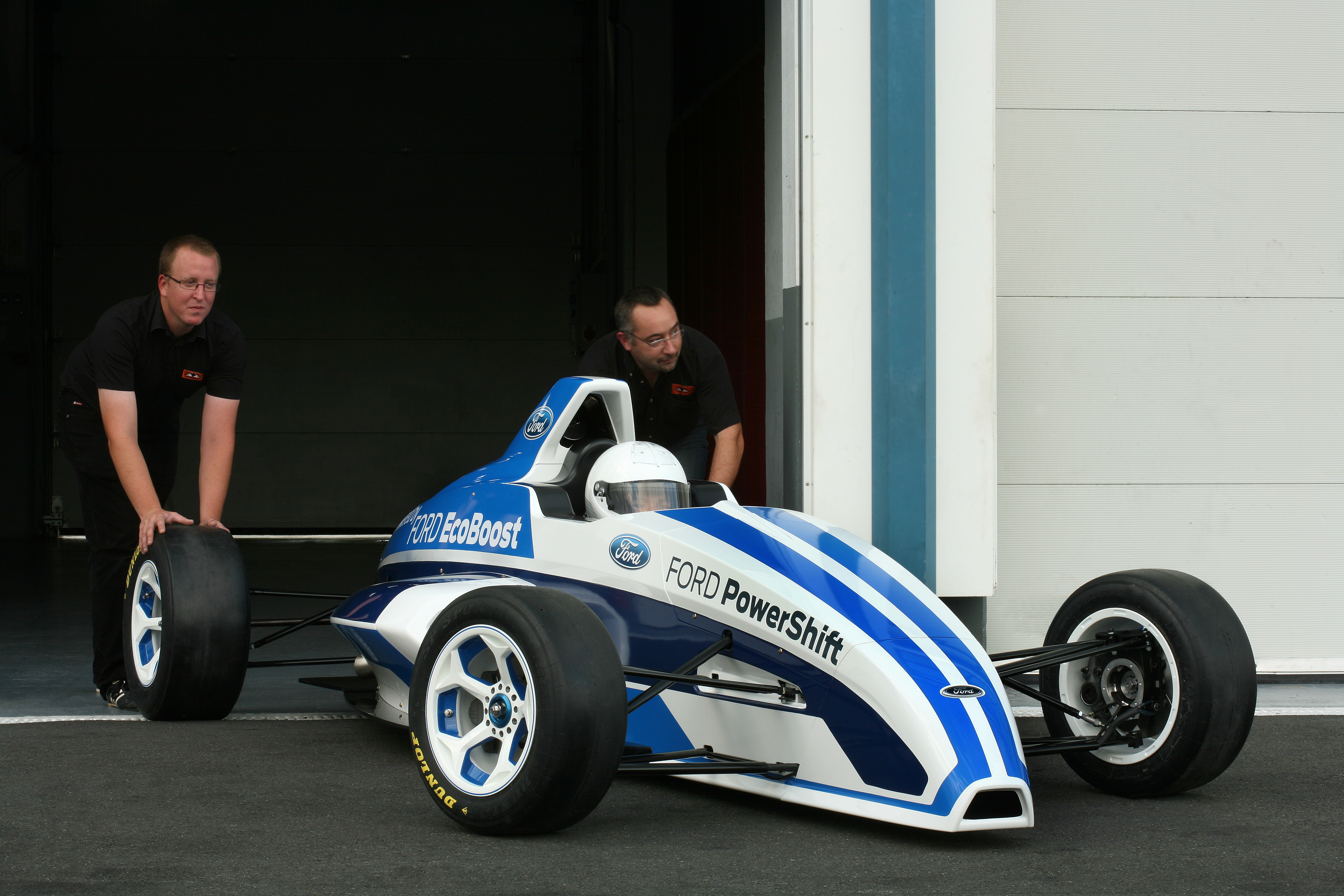
Formula Ford Ecoboost

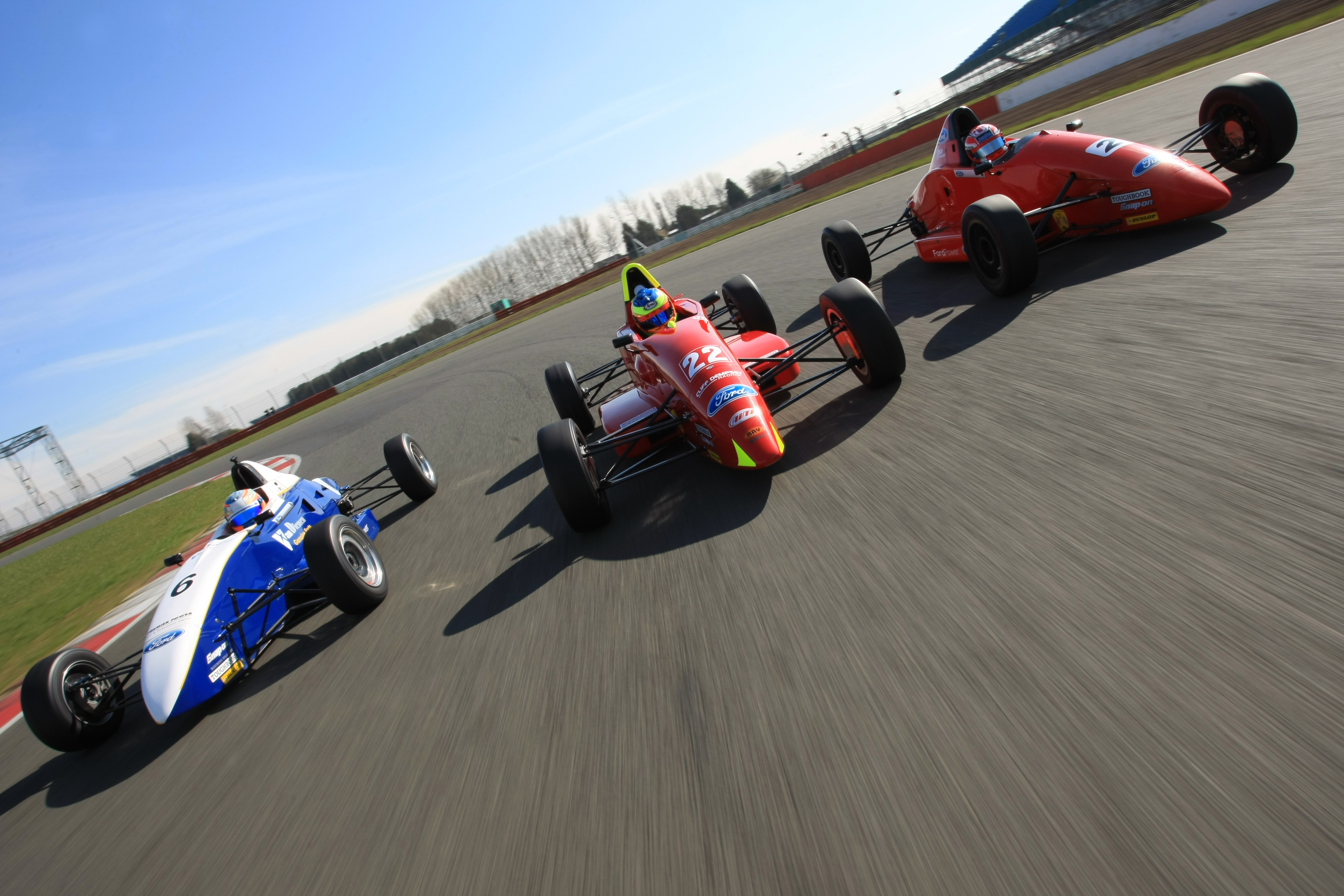
Formula Ford Duratec

Formula Ford, also known as F1600 and Formula F, is an entry-level class of single-seater, open-wheel formula racing. The various championships held across the world have historically been an important step for many prospective Formula One drivers. Formula Ford has traditionally been regarded as the first major stepping stone into formula racing after karting. The series typically sees career-minded drivers enter alongside amateurs and enthusiasts. Success in Formula Ford can lead directly to other junior formula series such as a Formula Renault 2.0 and Formula Three, or F1 Academy for female drivers.

Formula Ford is not a one-make championship, unlike the vast majority of open-wheeler series. It allows freedom of chassis design, engine build and numerous technical items of specification on the car. This opens the door to many chassis manufacturers, large and small.

Many drivers aspiring to professional careers in open wheelers racing now choose Formula 4 as their first car racing series, as it features cars with aerodynamic downforce, a semi-automatic gearbox, and other features found in Formula One and other professional open-wheeler series. Despite this, Formula Ford remains popular.

== History ==
The origins of Formula Ford began in the early 1960s, where motor racing schools such as the Jim Russell school and Motor Racing Stables featured single-seat Formula Junior and Formula Three-like machines from world-class constructors like Cooper and Lotus. Many aspiring Formula One stars looked to these schools in the hope of learning the craft and also looking the part. However, although there was no shortage of aspiring drivers, these schools had much trouble avoiding bankruptcy. The 1-litre Formula Three engines, the 1.1-litre Coventry Climax FJ and later the Kent engine from the Ford Anglia 105E, cost around £3,000 at the time in addition to the Dunlop racing tires which cost £80 a set. Furthermore, these engines were incredibly fragile and had a tendency to self-destruct. All these factors contributed to a steep maintenance and upkeep cost of the schools.

In 1963, Geoff Clarke; the owner of Motor Racing Stables, moved his racing school to the Brands Hatch circuit. This brought him in contact with John Webb; managing director of developments at Brands Hatch. At about this time, two of the school's Lotus Formula Junior chassis were fitted with a standard 1498cc Ford Kent pushrod engine as featured in the recently introduced Cortina GT saloon. The 1500 Cortina, with its reliability and horsepower output fairly close to “F3 proper” proved a resounding success in the school. The earliest experiments with radial tires bore fruit as well: the students of the day did not care that these were not the racing engines or racing tires, just that the cars were equal.

At an informal meeting at the December 1966 racing car show day at Olympia, Webb and Clarke were discussing the possibility of building a fleet of identical open wheel race cars based on the success of combining the Ford power plant and road wheels, radial tires, and Formula Junior style chassis. Not only would they make ideal school cars, but would also provide a new entry level formula for a race series. They felt if they called it “Formula Ford" they could get backing from Ford itself. Webb was on the phone the next day to Ford competition manager Henry Taylor, who agreed to provide Clarke and MRS with 54 Cortina GT engines at £50 each (£15 below retail). Webb also approached the Royal Automobile Club's competition director, to establish rules for this new class. Late in 1967, Ford announced the new Formula Ford class to the world.

Rules: (reprinted from May ‘67 issue of R.A.C. Motor Sport Bulletin)

1. Type of car – This formula is open to single-seat cars with open coach work as defined by the F.I.A. for Formula 1, 2, and 3 and complying with R.A.C. vehicle regulations.
2. Engine and ancillaries – Standard normal specification Cortina GT engine. All standard parts to be used with the exception of the air cleaner (which may be removed and substituted by a ‘trumpet’),

carburetor jets, spark plugs. Exhaust manifold, oil sump and pump (‘dry sump’ is allowed). Re-boring is permitted using production pistons to a limit of .015. The only modification is allowed if balancing and polishing but the compression ratio must not exceed 9:5:1 (total combustion space to be not less than 44.2cc per cylinder). The dimensions of all moving parts must be within standard Ford production tolerances.

3. Electrical equipment – Standard dynamo and starter to be retained in working order. Diameter of dynamo driver pulley free.
4. Cooling – Radiator, fan and water pump free.
5. Gearbox – Not more than four forward speeds and one reverse (which must be operable from the driving seat) but otherwise free.
6. Flywheel – Standard Cortina GT.
7. Clutch – Free including attachment to flywheel.
8. Drive – Rear-wheel drive only, final drive ratio free, but torque biasing differential not allowed.
9. Steering gear – Free.
10. Wheels – Only steel disc type with a maximum rim width of 5.5 in.
11. Brakes – Only Standard parts from any homologated Group II car(s) allowed, except for drums or discs or linings.
12. Fuel pump – Free.
13. Chassis – Of tubular construction with no stress-bearing panels except bulkheads and undertray, but the curvature of the undertray must be limited to a maximum of 1 in. Tubes may transport liquids if required.
14. Body – Free within limits of 1.
15. Fuel tanks – Free.
16. Suspension and running gear – Free except that all parts are steel except springs, hub adapters, rear hub carriers and bearing bushes the materials which are free.
17. Shock absorbers – Free.
18. Tires – Racing tires are not allowed-otherwise free within standard production retail range as specified in section 1 of R.A.C. tire regulations.
19. Weight – Minimum weight of 400 kg (881.6 lbs).
20. Cost – not to exceed £1,000 retail complete running order.
21. Eligibility – No driver who has competed in an International Formula 1 or Formula 2 race may participate.

Clarke then set about approaching existing race car constructors to build the first Formula Fords. Both Bruce McLaren and Jack Brabham turned down the idea; Colin Chapman however dusted off the obsolete Lotus 31 Chassis and reinvented it as the Lotus 51. He agreed to provide the first of two 25 car batches at £850 per car. The only stipulation Chapman had was that a Renault gearbox was to be used. This proved to be fundamental weak point in the drive train. Difficulty with the Renault transmission resulted in a failure to continue with the second batch of cars for MRS.

Russell approached Chapman to supply Formula Ford cars for his own school. Chapman insisted Russell match Clarke's 50 car order; Russell would only commit to 10 cars so the deal fell through. Russell then approached Taylor who built the Alexis car and a deal was struck to jointly produce the Russell-Alexis. This car had a Hewland racing gearbox which made the car more expensive (£999), but was more reliable and allowed interchangeable ratios.

The first standalone Formula Ford race took place at Brands Hatch on July 2, 1967. Of the 20 cars that competed, 10 were MRS Lotus 51s, including the eventual winner, Ray Allen. The Russell-Alexis car won its debut race in August 1967, and by 1968 54 Russell-Alexis had been sold. Based on this success Russell opened two more racing schools in Britain, another in Canada, and another in the United States.

Chapman and his Lotus 51 did recover, replacing the troublesome Renault gearbox with the Hewland unit, even claiming Russell as a customer in 1968. Also in 1968, Merlyn debuted as a Formula Ford constructor, dominating sales for that year. Other new manufactures included Crosslé Car Company, Dulon, Elden Racing Cars, Hawke Racing Cars and Royale Racing Cars, together with existing constructors such as Brabham choosing to build a Formula Ford chassis.

As the production Ford Cortina engine evolved to a new 1600cc crossflow unit, so did the Formula Ford regulations. Increasing costs forced them to relax the £1,000 price ceiling on Formula Ford as Blueprinting of the engine was now allowed.

Belgium hosted the first race outside England, in 1967. Formula Ford racing quickly spread across Europe and North America, with the first official Formula Ford race in the United States on March 23, 1969, and was included in the SCCA Runoffs that same year. By the late 1960s and early 1970s, Formula Ford had established itself as a direct path to a seat on a Formula One car, the highest level in open wheel motorsport. Australian Tim Schenken won over two dozen Formula Ford races in 1968, two years later he was driving a Formula One car for Frank Williams. Emerson Fittipaldi impressed during the 1970 Formula One Grand Prix season after a short stint in Formula Ford. In 1970, he became the first Formula Ford graduate to win a Formula One Grand Prix. In 1972, he became the first Formula Ford graduate to win the Formula One world championship.

In the United States, starting with a 1983 debut race and victory at the 1983 SCCA Runoffs the Swift DB-1 became the dominant chassis in North America Formula Ford racing with ten championships between 1983 and 1996. The DB-6 evolution of the chassis won an additional six championships through 2008. During this time Formula Ford was on the decline in the US for several reasons. The rising cost of competition, SCCA's introduction of a spec sports racer, Sports Renault, and the dominance of the Swift chassis helped to collapse the class in the US.

Currently, Formula Ford racing exists in two main forms in Europe: National Series for aspiring 'career' drivers run around the world which have used the 1600 Duratec engine, (which replaced the heavier but not significantly more powerful Zetec engine in 2006), and for 2012 are beginning to adopt the new EcoBoost 1600 turbo engine; and a mainly amateur, club-racing series attracting serious enthusiasts using the now rejuvenated 1600 Kent engine with which the formula ran from the mid-1960s to mid-1990s, as Ford restarted production of the Kent engine in 2009 for motorsport reasons. Whatever the engine of the Formula Ford car, it has long provided a relatively inexpensive way for drivers to race purpose-built racecars. There are many Formula Ford 1600 series for drivers of the older Kent-powered cars.

== Formula Ford cars ==
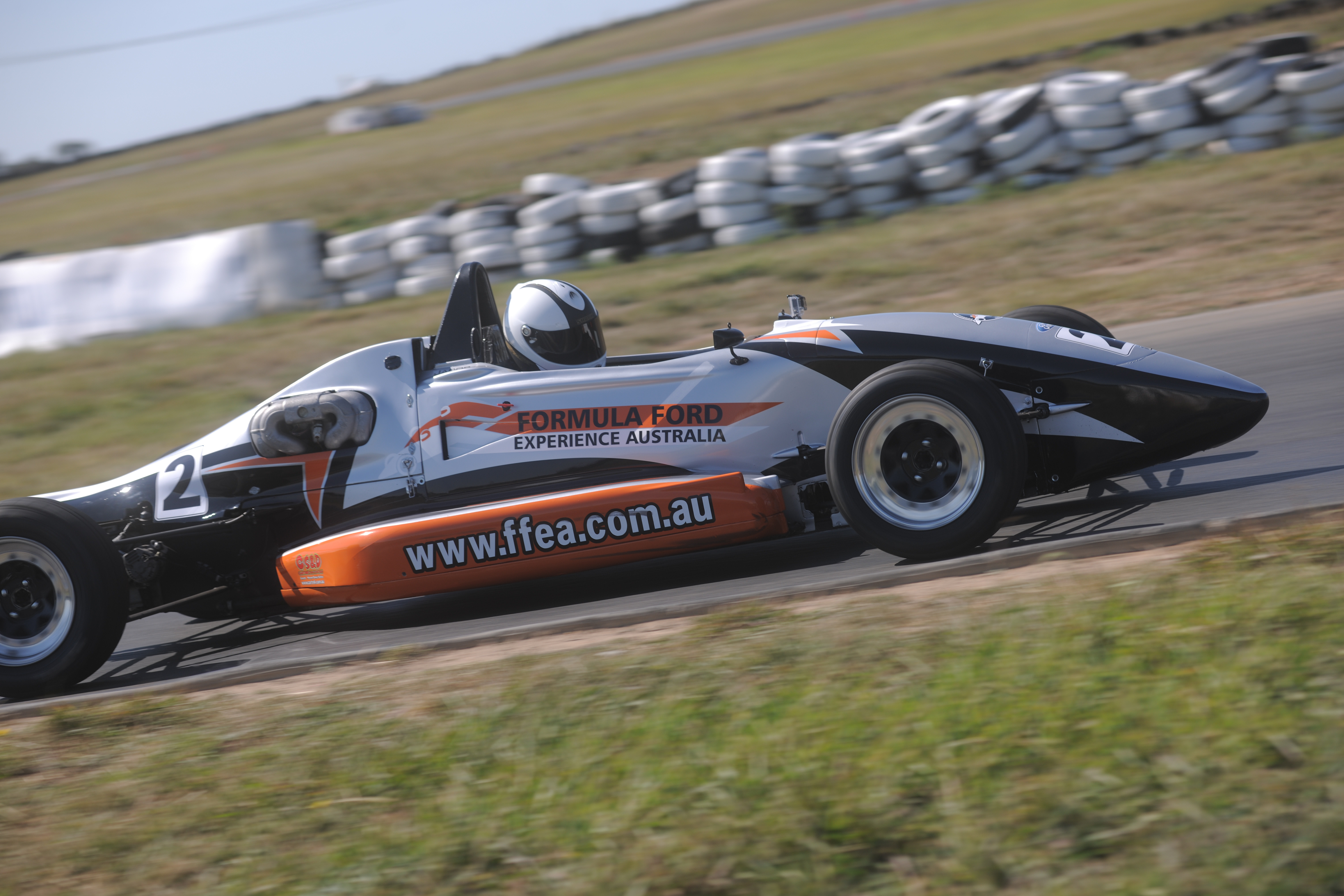
FFEA Van Diemen RF01 Chassis

A Formula Ford car is one of the more distinctive-looking open-wheel race cars because it does not have wings to create aerodynamic downforce. In order to reduce cost and allow smaller manufacturers to produce their own design of chassis without prohibitive tooling costs, chassis are steel space frame, unlike the monocoques found in other types of single-seater racing.

The more popular marques as of 2012 were Van Diemen, Mygale and the Australian-built Spectrum, but smaller manufacturers such as Ray Race Cars and Vector have had some success. Historical designers who have made a mark on the series have included: Titan, Lotus, Merlyn, Hawke, Citation, Swift, Euroswift, Elden, Reynard, Crosslé, Lola, Zink, Bowin, Royale, and Cooper Racing.

Top speeds in the National Class are easily as high as in the other junior formulae of BMW and Renault, but cornering speeds tend to be lower as Formula Ford cars lack the downforce-producing aerodynamic aids on the other cars; handling is therefore entirely down to mechanical grip, and the lack of wings ensures that cars following another are not aerodynamically disadvantaged, allowing some of the closest racing with plenty of overtaking. Series' rules may permit slick or treaded tires, generally supplied either by Dunlop or Avon. As the rules limit engine modifications, all cars are relatively equal and racing results tend to be close. Formula Fords allow suspension, damping, gearing and braking bias changes, but not aerodynamic options such as winged cars.

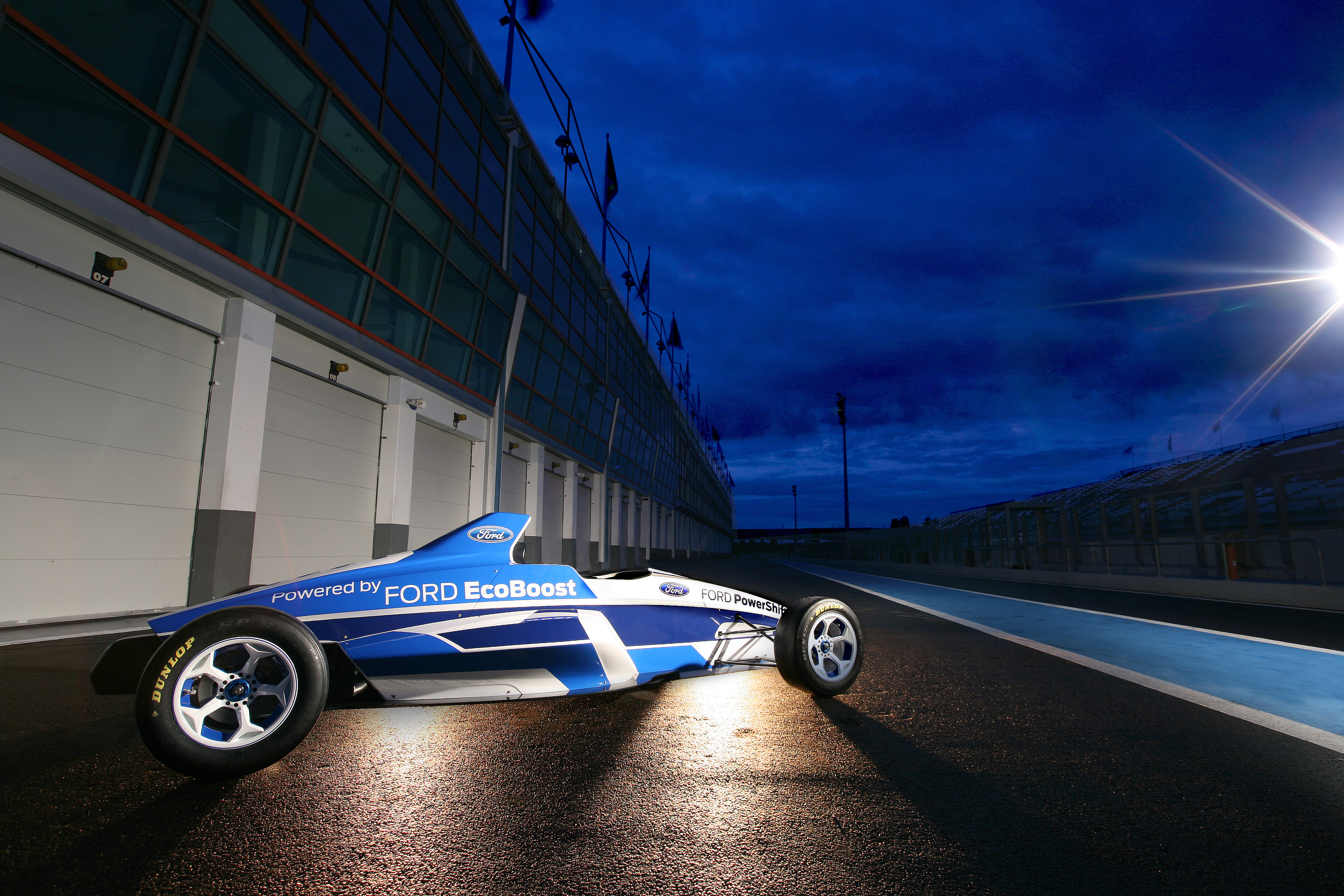
2012 Formula Ford Ecoboost

In 2012, new specifications and regulations were introduced, allowing the use of the new Ford EcoBoost engine along with improvements in chassis design. Unlike its predecessors, that used naturally aspirated engines and manual gearboxes, the EcoBoost car utilises power from a turbocharged engine and a sequential gearbox. The new car has 121 kW (165 PS; 162 hp), with identical engine calibration for every competitor's car. The chassis remains a steel spaceframe construction, with free chassis design open to all manufacturers. New to the car is its compliance with Formula Three safety standards, which involves mandatory crash structures, side-impact panels running the full height and length of the cockpit, an FIA-specified headrest and an extricable safety seat. In addition to the safety enhancements, some mandatory elements of bodywork shape have also been introduced. These will define the shape, size and orientation of the sidepod air intakes and the roll-hoop cover. By mandating these the frontal areas will be equalised between different manufacturers, removing the potential for significant aerodynamic advantage, making driving ability and the skills of engineers and designers in car set-up the major factors.

In the United States Formula Ford continues to use the earlier Ford Kent engines. For 2010 the Honda L15A7 engine used in the Honda Fit was introduced as an alternative engine. The Honda engine was developed in partnership with Quicksilver RacEngines with the intent of providing power similar to the existing Kent motor. Honda developed an install kit around the Swift DB-1 chassis. With the introduction of the Honda motor SCCA changed the class name from Formula Ford to Formula F.

== Related Formulae ==
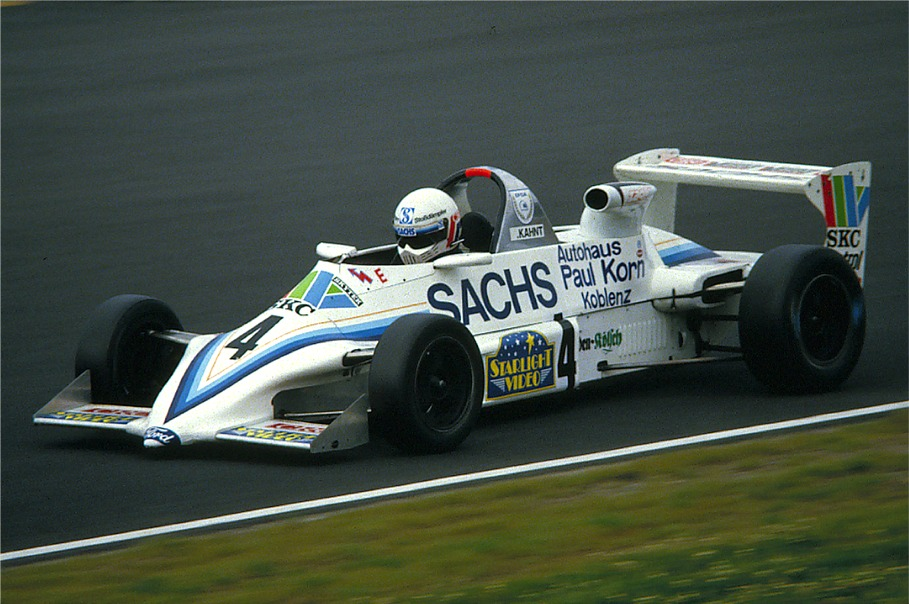
Reynard Formula Ford 2000 at the Nürburgring in 1985

Formula Ford has given birth to several other categories of racing: Formula Ford 2000 evolved in the 1970s to use a Pinto engine and, although it used basically Formula Ford chassis, permitted use of slicks and wings; it was seen as a natural step up from the 1600cc formula and a stepping stone to categories such as Formula Three. Formula Ford 2000 engines and transmissions were married to sports-racing chassis to produce Sports 2000.

Older Formula Fords, with outboard shock absorbers, race in the United States as Club Formula Fords in SCCA and other club racing series.

Formula F100 was an unsuccessful attempt in the late 1960s to create a sportscar category related to Formula Ford but using a 1300 cc Ford engine; the cars were heavy and slow. The proposed Formula Turbo Ford, an attempt to update FF2000, of the mid-1980s was limited to one Reynard that ran a few demonstration laps.

Formula Ford remains popular in its 1600 cc form—the cars are widely raced, sprinted and hillclimbed. Formula Continental is also a popular choice in the US and Canada. The class provides a venue for Formula Ford 2000 as well as the earlier Formula C (1100 cc pure racing engine) and Formula Super Vee (production-based VW engines) cars. Formula Continental cars employ aerodynamic effects (front and rear wings).

In the United States, used Formula Ford racing chassis are also proving to be a popular source of conversion into Formula 1000 cars and their closely related sports car bodied cousins D Sport Racing.

== Administration ==
Ford Motorsport administers some of the national Formula Ford championships around the world, and continue to control the technical regulations for all cars globally. The older Kent-engined cars are very popular with club racers, providing the ground for several organizations to run their own series. Many racing schools offer driver training in Formula Ford cars. However, in many countries, Formula BMW and Formula Renault Campus had superseded Formula Ford as the main entry level class in the mid-2000s; the demise of Formula BMW in Europe after only a few years of operation caused somewhat of a resurgence in support for the Ford grids. In the UK there are many club-level regional series aimed at the amateur enthusiast, as well as championships for older Fords. Since 2009, Ford officials in the United States has begun active production of Kent engines in the wake of the United States rules allowing Honda engines. Ford officials have noted the US-made Kent blocks are based on modern stamping, and shows how well-established the formula has become.

== Championships and events around the world ==
Formula Ford is worldwide, with championships and events currently occurring across the globe every year. Each of which is run to essentially the same rules and regulations, with minor variations for local conditions. From the UK to Australia and beyond, hundreds of Formula Ford cars compete win their respective championships and trophies.

=== United Formula Ford ===
The primary series contested in the United Kingdom for all classes of Formula Ford is United Formula Ford. Launched for the 2022 season the series was founded to 'unite' the different eras of Formula Ford under one name. The series has an overall standings as well as utilising a 5 class format with each having their own winner. The 5 classes include the Star Class (Post-1999), Regional (1993-1998), Heritage (1982-1992), Classic (1972-1981), and Historic (Pre-1972). Since its inception many tracks around the country have held host to the championship including a return of Formula Ford to Lydden Hill Race Circuit. Over the three seasons it has existed, the championship has had two different champions: Morgan Quinn (2022,2024) and Lucas Romanek (2023). The championship has also incorporated a number of different trophies, some which already existed, under the United Formula Ford umbrella. The Jim Walsh Trophy, which was created by James Beckett in 2003, takes place at the annual Silverstone round and celebrates the career of the three-time BRDC Formula Ford champion. The Peter Rogers Trophy, Bert Ray Memorial Trophy and Martin Down Trophy also take place during the United Formula Ford season as well as the Champion of Brands which has been a long-existing trophy in Formula Ford in the UK contested exclusively in the rounds at Brands Hatch. Since being re-introduced by MSVR in 2010 has had multiple formats with it now being a championship format with the driver with the most points claiming the trophy at the end of the season. Previously it was a winner-stays-on structure and has seen countless different winners including Jonathan Browne and 4-time Walter Hayes Trophy winner Joey Foster. In 2025, United Formula Ford has 15 races across 7 rounds and has already seen a grid of 30+ cars on the Silverstone Grand Prix Circuit.

=== Formula Ford Festival ===
For many years the highlight of the Formula Ford season was the Formula Ford Festival at Brands Hatch, England. Entries of several hundred cars from all over the Formula Ford world were common into the 1990s, with racers competing in knockout heats to decide the grid for a grand final. Entries later declined, and later festivals struggled to attract more than 40-50 cars, enough for two heats and a final. More "historic" FF1600 cars had been turning up for the supporting races than contemporary Zetecs, however in 2006 the Festival saw the Duratec engine for the first time thereby having a final for all three marques at one meeting for the first time. The Walter Hayes Trophy now recognises the continuing interest in 1600cc 'Kent' Formula Ford and attracted over 150 entries in 2006, including several drivers who more commonly compete in much more senior formulae.

=== Formula Ford EuroCup ===
The Formula Ford EuroCup, known originally as the "European Formula Ford Championship", is the current incarnation of a pan-European championship for Formula Ford competitors, last held previously in 2001. The 2011 series was aimed at giving drivers experience at European race circuits. Three national Formula Ford championships are involved in the revived championship, these being the British, Benelux and Scandinavian championships. While individual events nominate a winner, there is no overarching point score to declare a series champion.

=== Australian Formula Ford Series ===
The Australian Formula Ford Series is an Australian motor racing competition for Formula Ford racing cars. It has been held annually since 1970, originally as a national series and from 1993 to 2013 as the Australian Formula Ford Championship. The control engine was changed from the first-generation Kent engine to the third-generation Mazda-sourced Ford Duratec engine in 2006. In 2014 the championship was downgraded to a national series with Duratec-engined cars and Kent-engined cars both eligible to compete alongside each other. Currently, the winner wins a ticket to a scouting combine for INDYCAR at the end of the calendar year.

=== USF2000 Championship ===
The USF2000 Championship is an American racing series using the American variation of the Formula Ford formula, Formula Ford 2000, that resumed operation for the 2010 season. It is sanctioned by the United States Auto Club, and is a part of Road to Indy.

=== F1600 Championship Series ===
The F1600 Championship Series was created by the SCCA in 2011. The series is organized by Formula Race Promotions, the same organization which organizes the F2000 Championship Series. The class operates under the same rules as the SCCA Formula F, with both the Ford Kent and Honda L15A7 engines permitted. Therefore, many drivers from the local club racing scene make their appearance in the national series.

=== Southern Formula 1600 Championship ===
The Southern Formula 1600 Championship was created by Right Turn Promotions and Primus Racing Parts for 2018. The series races on SCCA event weekends, alongside the Southern Formula 2000 Championship. The class operates under the same rules as the SCCA Formula F. Racing at traditional road race tracks in the southern United States, the series attracts drivers from across all forms of club and pro racing.

=== SCCA Runoffs ===
The SCCA National Championship Runoffs is the end-of-year championship race meeting for Sports Car Club of America Club Racing competitors. Divisional champions and other top drivers from the SCCA's 116 regions are invited to participate at the Runoffs. National championships are awarded to the winners of each class. Formula Ford (now Formula F) was first included in the Runoffs in 1969.

=== List of Formula Ford championships and events ===
Country/region	Series/event name	Active years	Additional information
Asia	Formula Asia	1994-2002	
Australia	Formula Ford National Series	1970	
Australia	Formula Ford Driver to Europe Series	1971-1992	
Australia	Australian Formula Ford Championship	1993-2013	
Australia	Australian Formula Ford Series	2014–present	
Australia	New South Wales Formula Ford Championship	1991–2011?	Regional state championships.
Australia	Queensland Formula Ford Championship		Regional state championships.
Australia	South Australian Formula Ford Championship		Regional state championships.
Australia	Victorian Formula Ford Championship		Regional state championships.
Australia	Western Australia Formula Ford Championship		Regional state championships.
Austria	Austrian Formula Ford Championship	1971–1984	
Benelux region	Benelux Formula Ford Championship	1981–present	Linked with the Dutch championship.
Belgium	Belgian Formula Ford Championship	1980–1987	
Brazil	Brazilian Formula Ford Championship	1971–1996	
Canada	Canadian Formula Ford Challenge	?–2004	
Canada	Ontario Formula Ford Championship	?–2010	replaced with Toyo Tires F1600 Championship Series
Canada	Toyo Tires F1600 Championship Series	2011–present	
Canada	Québec Formula Tour 1600 (Canada)	2006–present	
Canada	Ontario/Quebec F1600 Super Series	2014–present	combines drivers from Toyo Tires F1600 Championship Series and Québec Formula Tour 1600
Canada	Canadian Formula Ford 2000 Championship	1983–1991	
	Formula Ford International North Sea Series	2013–present	
Denmark	Danish Formula Ford Championship	1970–present	
Denmark	Danish Formula Ford 2000 championship	1979–2003	
Finland	Finnish Formula Ford Championship	1987?–present	
France	French Formula Ford Championship	1984–2005	
France	Trophée Formula Ford Kent	2000-present	Replaced de facto Formula Ford French Championship after 2005, runs with FF1600 cars prior to 1993
France	Formula Ford Historic France	2009-present	Historic racing, runs with FF1600 made prior to 1982
Europe	European Formula Ford Championship	1969–1973, 1995–2001	
Europe	EFDA Formula Ford 1600 Championship	1979–1987	
Europe	EFDA Formula Ford 2000 Championship	1979–1987	
Europe	Formula Ford EuroCup	2011–2012	
West Germany then Germany	German Formula Ford Championship	1973–2001	
Italy	Italian Formula Ford Championship	1970–1977	
Netherlands	Dutch Formula Ford Championship	1970–2012	Linked to the Benelux championship. To International North Sea Series.
New Zealand	New Zealand Formula Ford Championship	1971–present	
Portugal	Portuguese Formula Ford 1600 Championship	1970–1972, 1985–1994	
Portugal	Portuguese Formula Ford 1800 Championship	1993–1998	
Portugal	Portuguese Formula Ford 2000 Championship	2000–2002	
FIA Northern European Zone	North European Formula Ford Championship		Single round format.
Scandinavia	Scandinavian Formula Ford championship	?–present	
South Africa	South African Formula Ford Championship	1967–present	
Spain	Spanish Formula Ford Championship	1986–1993	Since 1981 as Fórmula Fiesta
Sweden	Swedish Formula Ford Championship	1969?–2007, 2012	
Europe	Swiss Formula Ford championship	1979–1987	
Europe	Swiss Formula Ford 2000 championship	1986–1987	
United Kingdom	British Formula Ford Championship	1976–2014	
United Kingdom	British Formula Ford 2000 Championship	1975–1987	
United Kingdom	BARC Formula Ford 2000 Championship	1977–1988	
United Kingdom	BRSCC National Formula Ford 1600	2012–2023	Starting off as Club FF1600, it became Britain's major FF1600 series once British FFord became MSA Formula
United Kingdom	United Formula Ford	2022–present	Created in 2022 to 'unite' the different eras of Formula Ford in the UK
United Kingdom	Formula Ford Festival	1972–present	
United Kingdom	Walter Hayes Trophy	2001–present	End of Season event at Silverstone bring together FF1600s from around the world
United Kingdom	Classic Formula Ford	2012–present	Championship run by the HSCC for Formula Fords built 1972-1982
United Kingdom	Historic Formula Ford	1992–present	Championship run by the HSCC for Formula Fords built pre-1972
United States	U.S. F2000 National Championship	1990–2006; 2010–present	From 2017 onwards no longer compliant with any other FF rules set
United States	F1600 Championship Series	2011–present	Run in the eastern United States
United States	F2000 Championship Series	2006–present	Run in the eastern United States
United States	Pacific F2000 Championship	2004–present	Based in California, with one Nevada round
