= Swift Cooper =

Swift Cooper is a British race car constructor. The company was formed in 1986, when Frank Bradley bought the rights to the Swift name from Swift Engineering, and set up the company at Snetterton race course in Norfolk. Swift Cooper builds cars for Formula Ford regulations.

Swift cars won in the British Formula Ford Championship from 1993 to 1995 and the Benelux Formula Ford Championship from 1996 to 1998.

In late 1995, the company was purchased from Brian Holmes by ex-Formula 3 racer Gavin Wills and ex-Reynard Motorsport sales manager, James Linton, who he had originally met fourteen years earlier as a teenager racing karts. The two moved the manufacturing operation and the race team from its Chesterfield, Yorkshire, base to Plymouth, Devon and employed a team of 21 people to design, manufacture and service the Formula Ford single-seater race cars they produced. Over a period of three years (1996, 1997 & 1998) the company manufactured 75 cars for race teams around the world and won 27 championships worldwide.

1996 Formula Ford Zetec Championship wins

- Swiss
- Dutch
- Benelux
- Belgium
- Portuguese
- British Class B

1997 Formula Ford Zetec Championship wins

- Swiss
- Irish
- Belgian
- British Class B

Clients included Formula One champions Jody Scheckter and Alan Jones who purchased cars for their sons Tomas Scheckter, Toby Scheckter and Christian Jones to compete in South African and Australian Formula Ford Championships respectively.

In 1998 the company moved to its new and present home at the Castle Combe Circuit in Wiltshire and was sold to Alan Cooper to become Swift Cooper.

A Swift car won the Finnish Championship in 1999.

The first car under the new company name, the SC2000Z, was driven by Ollie Kaurala in the 2000 Championship.
