= 2003 British Formula Ford Championship =

Motor race

Seasons
- ← 2002 2004 →

The 2003 British Formula Ford Championship is the 28th edition of the British Formula Ford Championship. It commenced on 21 April at Mondello Park and end on 21 September at Oulton Park after 10 rounds and 21 races, all in support of the British Touring Car Championship and Champ Car when they visited Brands Hatch in May. This was the last year until 2013 that the series supported the British Touring Car Championship as they switched to supporting the British GT and British Formula Three Championship from 2004 to 2012.

== Drivers and teams ==
Team	No	Driver	Class	Chassis	Rounds
(United Kingdom) ComTec Racing	1	(United Kingdom) Tom Gaymor	C	Van Diemen RF03	All
(United Kingdom) ComTec Racing	6	(United Kingdom) Oliver Jarvis	C	?	All
(United Kingdom) ComTec Racing	7	(United Kingdom) Dan Clarke	C	Van Diemen RF03	All
(United Kingdom) ComTec Racing	9	(United Kingdom) Charlie Donnelly	S	?	All
(United Kingdom) Panasonic Batteries Team JLR	2	(United Kingdom) Tom Kimber-Smith	C	?	All
(United Kingdom) Panasonic Batteries Team JLR	3	(United Kingdom) Stuart Hall	C	?	1-7
(United Kingdom) Panasonic Batteries Team JLR	4	(United Kingdom) James Walker	S	?	All
(United Kingdom) Panasonic Batteries Team JLR	5	(Estonia) Marko Asmer	C	?	All
(United Kingdom) Panasonic Batteries Team JLR	39	(South Africa) Gavin Cronje	C	?	8
(United Kingdom) Ray Sport	10	(India) Sukhjit Sandher	C	?	All
(United Kingdom) Ray Sport	11	(Sweden) Alx Danielsson	C	?	All
(United Kingdom) Continental Racing	12	(United Kingdom) Matt Allison	C	?	1-6
(United Kingdom) Continental Racing	14	(Mexico) Mauricio Godínez Castañeda	S	?	1-2
(United Kingdom) Continental Racing	16	(United Kingdom) Joey Foster	C	?	All
(United Kingdom) Continental Racing	46	(United Kingdom) Adam Jackson	S	?	9
(United Kingdom) Team MDR	15	(Mexico) Diego Fernandez	S	?	All
(United Kingdom) Team MDR	30	(United Kingdom) Jay Howard	S	?	1-9
(United Kingdom) Team MDR	31	(United Kingdom) Nigel Redwood	S	?	All
(United Kingdom) Team MDR	33	(Finland) Henri Sillanpää	S	?	6
(United Kingdom) Team MDR	45	(Mexico) Antonio Pérez Mendoza	S	?	1-5, 7-10
(United Kingdom) Medina Sport	17	(United Kingdom) Stephen Jelley	S	?	All
(United Kingdom) Medina Sport	18	(Japan) Hideto Yasuoka	S	?	All
(United Kingdom) Medina Sport	19	(United Kingdom) Matt Howson	C	?	All
(United Kingdom) Nexa Racing	20	(Finland) Valle Mäkelä	C	?	All
(United Kingdom) Nexa Racing	21	(United States) Matthew Koskinen	C	?	All
(United Kingdom) Nexa Racing	22	(Japan) Yuya Sakamoto	C	?	All
(Republic of Ireland) Dwyer Engineering	23	(Republic of Ireland) Alan Dwyer	S	?	1
(United Kingdom) Team PCMR	24	(United Kingdom) Jon Lanceley	S	?	5, 8-10
(United Kingdom) Team PCMR	25	(United Kingdom) Chris Rodgers	S	Mygale SJ01	2-7
(United Kingdom) Team PCMR	26	(United Kingdom) Julian Yap	S	?	All
(United Kingdom) Team PCMR	37	(United Kingdom) Chaz Small	S	?	7
(United Kingdom) Jato Motorsport	27	(United Kingdom) James Harris	S	?	1-5, 7-10
(United Kingdom) Jato Motorsport	32	(United Kingdom) Tony Rodgers	C	?	All
(United Kingdom) AMG Motorsport	29	(United Kingdom) George McAlpin	C	?	1
(United Kingdom) Jamun Racing	33	(United Kingdom) Sebastian King	S	?	2
(United Kingdom) Jamun Racing	84	(United Kingdom) Ben Clucas	C	?	1-8
(United Kingdom) Team Welcome Motorsport	46	(United Kingdom) Adam Jackson	S	?	4-7

Icon	Class
C	Championship
S	Scholarship

== Race calendar and results ==
Round		Circuit	Date	Pole position	Fastest lap	Winning driver	Winning team	Scholarship Winner
1	R1	(Republic of Ireland) Mondello Park	21 April	(United Kingdom) Ben Clucas	(United Kingdom) James Walker	(United Kingdom) Ben Clucas	(United Kingdom) Jamun Racing	(United Kingdom) Jay Howard
1	R2	(Republic of Ireland) Mondello Park	21 April		(Sweden) Alx Danielsson	(United Kingdom) Ben Clucas	(United Kingdom) Jamun Racing	(United Kingdom) Charlie Donnelly
2	3A	(United Kingdom) Brands Hatch	4 May	(United Kingdom) Ben Clucas	(United Kingdom) Ben Clucas	(United Kingdom) Ben Clucas	(United Kingdom) Jamun Racing	(United Kingdom) Jay Howard
2	3B	(United Kingdom) Brands Hatch	4 May	(Sweden) Alx Danielsson	(United Kingdom) Dan Clarke	(Sweden) Alx Danielsson	(United Kingdom) Ray Sport	(United Kingdom) James Walker
2	R4	(United Kingdom) Brands Hatch	4 May	(United Kingdom) Ben Clucas	(Japan) Yuya Sakamoto	(Sweden) Alx Danielsson	(United Kingdom) Ray Sport	(Mexico) Antonio Pérez Mendoza
3	R5	(United Kingdom) Thruxton Circuit	26 May	(United Kingdom) Oliver Jarvis	(Estonia) Marko Asmer	(United Kingdom) Tom Kimber-Smith	(United Kingdom) Panasonic Batteries Team JLR	(United Kingdom) James Walker
3	R6	(United Kingdom) Thruxton Circuit	26 May		(United Kingdom) Dan Clarke	(United Kingdom) Tom Kimber-Smith	(United Kingdom) Panasonic Batteries Team JLR	(United Kingdom) James Walker
4	R7	(United Kingdom) Silverstone Circuit	8 June	(United Kingdom) Tom Gaymor	(United Kingdom) Tom Kimber-Smith	(United Kingdom) Tom Gaymor	(United Kingdom) ComTec Racing	(United Kingdom) James Walker
4	R8	(United Kingdom) Silverstone Circuit	8 June	Race postponed. Run at Snetterton Motor Racing Circuit.				
5	R9	(United Kingdom) Rockingham Motor Speedway	22 June	(Sweden) Alx Danielsson	(United Kingdom) Tom Gaymor	(United Kingdom) Tom Kimber-Smith	(United Kingdom) Panasonic Batteries Team JLR	(United Kingdom) Stephen Jelley
5	R10	(United Kingdom) Rockingham Motor Speedway	22 June		(Sweden) Alx Danielsson	(United Kingdom) Tom Kimber-Smith	(United Kingdom) Panasonic Batteries Team JLR	(United Kingdom) James Walker
6	R11	(United Kingdom) Croft Circuit	13 July	(Estonia) Marko Asmer	(Finland) Valle Mäkelä	(Estonia) Marko Asmer	(United Kingdom) Panasonic Batteries Racing Team	(United Kingdom) James Walker
6	R12	(United Kingdom) Croft Circuit	13 July		(Estonia) Marko Asmer	(Estonia) Marko Asmer	(United Kingdom) Panasonic Batteries Racing Team	(United Kingdom) James Walker
7	R8	(United Kingdom) Snetterton Circuit	8 August	(United Kingdom) Tom Gaymor	(Finland) Valle Mäkelä	(United Kingdom) Tom Kimber-Smith	(United Kingdom) Panasonic Batteries Racing Team	(United Kingdom) James Walker
7	R13	(United Kingdom) Snetterton Circuit	9 August	(Finland) Valle Mäkelä	(United Kingdom) Joey Foster	(Finland) Valle Mäkelä	(United Kingdom) Nexa Racing	(United Kingdom) Jay Howard
7	R14	(United Kingdom) Snetterton Circuit	10 August		(United Kingdom) Joey Foster	(United Kingdom) Joey Foster	(United Kingdom) Continental Racing	(United Kingdom) Jay Howard
8	R15	(United Kingdom) Brands Hatch	25 August	(Japan) Yuya Sakamoto	(United Kingdom) Joey Foster	(Japan) Yuya Sakamoto	(United Kingdom) Nexa Racing	(Japan) Hideto Yasuoka
8	R16	(United Kingdom) Brands Hatch	25 August		(United Kingdom) Ben Clucas	(Sweden) Alx Danielsson	(United Kingdom) Ray Sport	(Japan) Hideto Yasuoka
9	R17	(United Kingdom) Donington Park	6 September	(United Kingdom) Tom Kimber-Smith	(United Kingdom) Tom Gaymor	(United Kingdom) Tom Gaymor	(United Kingdom) ComTec Racing	(United Kingdom) James Walker
9	R18	(United Kingdom) Donington Park	7 September		(Finland) Valle Mäkelä	(United Kingdom) Tom Gaymor	(United Kingdom) ComTec Racing	(United Kingdom) James Walker
10	R19	(United Kingdom) Oulton Park	21 September	(United Kingdom) Joey Foster	(Finland) Valle Mäkelä	(United Kingdom) Joey Foster	(United Kingdom) Continental Racing	(United Kingdom) James Walker
10	R20	(United Kingdom) Oulton Park	21 September		(United Kingdom) Matt Howson	(United Kingdom) Joey Foster	(United Kingdom) Continental Racing	(United Kingdom) Julian Yap

== Drivers' Championship ==
Pos.	Driver	MON (Republic of Ireland)		BHI (United Kingdom)			THR (United Kingdom)		SIL (United Kingdom)		ROC (United Kingdom)		CRO (United Kingdom)		SNE (United Kingdom)			BHI (United Kingdom)		DON (United Kingdom)		OUL (United Kingdom)		Pts
Championship Class
1	(United Kingdom) Tom Kimber-Smith	9	2	5		Ret	1	1	2	C	1	1	9	8	1	3	4	6	3	21	7	8	8	421
2	(United Kingdom) Joey Foster	14	11	2		13	5	Ret	9	C	7	4	3	4	5	2	1	3	5	9	Ret	1	1	394
3	(Finland) Valle Mäkelä	5	7		6	3	8	7	7	C	Ret	8	2	2	4	1	DSQ	4	2	18	Ret	3	3	392
4	(Sweden) Alx Danielsson	6	12		1	1	15	16	Ret	C	2	Ret	4	3	8	6	8	2	1	2	3	4	Ret	365
5	(United Kingdom) Tom Gaymor	13	4	3		Ret	4	5	1	C	Ret	Ret	12	10	2	7	5	Ret	16	1	1	2	Ret	316
6	(Japan) Yuya Sakamoto	Ret	19	4		2	10	6	4	C	10	10	17	17	3	18	17	1	4	3	4	15	7	316
7	(United Kingdom) Ben Clucas	1	1	1		7	Ret	Ret	Ret	C	8	9	6	7	14	4	2	8	6					281
8	(United Kingdom) Oliver Jarvis	4	10		4	Ret	Ret	12	Ret	C	3	Ret	7	6	Ret	5	6	7	7	6	Ret	7	4	274
9	(United Kingdom) Matt Howson	8	18	6		NC	3	3	5	C	Ret	15	Ret	DNS	6	Ret	10	5	Ret	4	2	10	2	265
10	(United Kingdom) Tony Rodgers	10	3	9		4	11	9	Ret	C	6	3	Ret	Ret	12	12	19	13	Ret	16	8	6	5	254
11	(Estonia) Marko Asmer	7	5		5	Ret	6	13	10	C	4	Ret	1	1	9	Ret	7	15	Ret	Ret	9	Ret	9	252
12	(United Kingdom) Dan Clarke	DNS	14		3	Ret	7	4	Ret	C	Ret	Ret	Ret	12	Ret	Ret	Ret	12	10	8	6	16	11	161
13	(United States) Matthew Koskinen	12	22		8	8	16	19	20	C	Ret	Ret	10	11	15	Ret	Ret	19	19	14	13	14	Ret	140
14	(India) Sukhjit Sandher	Ret	15		7	Ret	20	Ret	21	C	DNS	Ret	13	15	16	19	Ret	Ret	17	12	15	9	6	128
15	(United Kingdom) Stuart Hall	DNS	13	Ret		DNS	13	10	6	C	9	Ret	8	9	19	Ret	18							106
16	(United Kingdom) Matt Allison	18	17		10	Ret	2	2	Ret	C	Ret	Ret	11	22										90
17	(South Africa) Gavin Cronje																	10	14					24
-	(United Kingdom) George McAlpin	DNS	DNS																					0
Scholarship Class
1	(United Kingdom) James Walker	3	Ret		2	Ret	9	8	3	C	12	2	5	5	7	10	Ret	Ret	15	5	5	5	14	466
2	(United Kingdom) Stephen Jelley	20	9	8		10	14	11	8	C	5	5	15	20	20	14	12	16	12	22	Ret	20	13	417
3	(Japan) Hideto Yasuoka	19	23	Ret		Ret	21	14	12	C	11	6	Ret	16	Ret	13	9	9	8	11	18	11	Ret	345
4	(United Kingdom) Jay Howard	2	Ret	7		12	12	Ret	11	C	14	Ret	Ret	13	10	8	3	Ret	13	7	20			331
5	(United Kingdom) Julian Yap	17	21		11	11	18	22	16	C	Ret	14	16	19	Ret	17	15	20	Ret	15	12	12	10	321
6	(United Kingdom) Charlie Donnelly	11	6		NC	17	23	21	17	C	13	11	Ret	Ret	Ret	Ret	14	14	11	10	11	13	16	303
7	(United Kingdom) Nigel Redwood	15	Ret	11		16	17	18	15	C	15	Ret	18	18	21	16	16	18	Ret	17	16	19	15	300
8	(Mexico) Antonio Pérez Mendoza	DNS	16	10		5	19	15	Ret	C	Ret	Ret			13	9	Ret	11	9	13	10	Ret	12	296
9	(Mexico) Diego Fernandez	16	24	13		15	22	20	18	C	18	13	21	21	18	15	13	NC	21	20	19	17	Ret	272
10	(United Kingdom) Chris Rodgers				9	6	Ret	17	13	C	Ret	7	14	14	11	11	Ret							215
drivers ineligible for points
	(United Kingdom) James Harris	Ret	8	12		9	Ret	Ret	19	C	Ret	Ret			17	DNS	11	17	18	Ret	Ret	18	17	0
	(United Kingdom) Jon Lanceley										17	12						21	20	19	17	DNS	DNS	0
	(Mexico) Mauricio Godínez Castañeda	Ret	20		12	14																		0
	(United Kingdom) Sebastian King				13	Ret																		0
	(United Kingdom) Adam Jackson								14	C	16	Ret	19	Ret	Ret	Ret	Ret			Ret	14			0
	(Finland) Henri Sillanpää												20	Ret										0
	(United Kingdom) Chaz Small															Ret	20							0
	(Republic of Ireland) Alan Dwyer	DNS	DNS																					0
Pos.	Driver	MON (Republic of Ireland)		BHI (United Kingdom)			THR (United Kingdom)		SIL (United Kingdom)		ROC (United Kingdom)		CRO (United Kingdom)		SNE (United Kingdom)			BHI (United Kingdom)		DON (United Kingdom)		OUL (United Kingdom)		Pts
