= Charlie Donnelly =

Irish motor racing driver (born 1983)

- Nationality: (Republic of Ireland) Irish
- Born: June 2, 1983 (age 43) Naas, County Kildare, Ireland

Previous series
- 2002-2005: Formula Ford Great Britain

Championship titles
- 2005: Formula Ford Great Britain

Charlie Donnelly (born 2 June 1983) is an Irish former racing driver who won the 2005 Formula Ford Great Britain championship.

== Career ==
Donnelly was born in Naas, Ireland. He began racing in karting, and in September 2001 was named Irish motorsport's "Young Racing Driver of the Month".

Donnelly moved into racing Formula Ford in 2002, competing in four races in the UK Zetec Championship at Mondello Park and Donington Park. His best finish was 9th, and scored 23 points in the championship. For 2003, he competed in the scholarship class of Formula Ford Great Britain, and won one race and scored six podiums on the way to 6th place in the championship for ComTec Racing. For 2004, he moved into the new Mygale SJ04 chassis with Jamun Racing and won four races, scored his first pole and two fastest laps. His wins came at Donington Park, Knockhill, Thruxton and Brands Hatch. He finished the season in seventh place overall. His biggest success came in 2005, once again with Jamun Racing and the Mygale chassis, he won the Formula Ford Great Britain Championship. Over the 20 races, Donnelly won four, scored a further fourteen podiums, one pole and eight fastest laps. At Croft, he won both races and it would only be on three occasions - at Silverstone and Snetterton - that he did not appear on the podium.

In the off-season, Donnelly tested a Formula Ford 2000 car at Road Atlanta alongside J. R. Hildebrand.

== After racing ==
Donnelly is now based in his hometown of Naas, and runs a car dealership.

== Racing Record ==
=== Career Summary ===
Season	Series	Team	Races	Wins	Poles	F/Laps	Podiums	Points	Position
2002	British Formula Ford Championship		4	0	0	0	0	23	20th
2002	British Formula Ford Winter Series		4	0	0	0	0	0	NC
2002	Formula Ford Festival		1	0	0	0	0	0	16th
2003	British Formula Ford Championship	Comtec Racing	20	1	0	0	6	309	6th
2003	Formula Ford Festival	Comtec Racing	1	0	0	0	0	0	8th
2004	British Formula Ford Championship	Jamun Racing	15	4	1	2	4	275	7th
2004	Formula Ford Festival	Jamun Racing	1	0	0	0	0	0	NC
2005	British Formula Ford Championship	Jamun Racing	20	4	1	8	17	536	1st
2005	Formula Ford Festival	Jamun Racing	1	0	0	0	1	0	2nd
