= 2004 British Formula Ford Championship =

Seasons
- ← 2003 2005 →

The 2004 British Formula Ford Championship is the 29th edition of the British Formula Ford Championship. The first race started on 4 April at Donington Park and the last race on 3 October at Brands Hatch after 10 rounds and 20 races. The series switched from supporting the British Touring Car Championship to supporting the British GT and British Formula Three Championship. After 2004 the series continued to support the two series until the end of 2012.

== Drivers and teams ==
Team	No	Driver	Chassis	Rounds
(United Kingdom) Team JLR	1	(United Kingdom) Dan Clarke	Van Diemen RF04	All
(United Kingdom) Team JLR	2	(United States) Charlie Kimball	Van Diemen RF04	All
(United Kingdom) Team JLR	3	(United States) Joe D'Agostino	Van Diemen RF03	All
(United Kingdom) Team JLR	4	(Colombia) Alexis Sabet	Van Diemen RF04	All
(United Kingdom) Kevin Mills Racing	5	(United Kingdom) Robert Sunderland	Van Diemen RF03	All
(United Kingdom) Kevin Mills Racing	6	(United Kingdom) Stuart Gough	Van Diemen RF03	All
(United Kingdom) Kevin Mills Racing	18	(United Kingdom) Neil Doran	Van Diemen RF03	1–8, 10
(United Kingdom) Ray Sport	7	(United Kingdom) Matt Howson	Ray GRS04	All
(United Kingdom) Nexa Racing	9	(Sweden) Sebastian Hohenthal	Van Diemen RF03	All
(United Kingdom) Nexa Racing	10	(India) Sukhjit Sandher	Van Diemen RF03	All
(United Kingdom) Nexa Racing	11	(Finland) Valle Mäkelä	Van Diemen RF03	All
(United Kingdom) Nexa Racing	12	(Japan) Yuya Sakamoto	Van Diemen RF03	All
(United Kingdom) Nexa Racing	22	(United Kingdom) Richard Keen	?	7
(United Kingdom) ?	13	(United Kingdom) Andrew Bentley	?	2
(United Kingdom) ?	15	(United Kingdom) Sarah Playfair	Mygale SJ01	3
(United Kingdom) ?	48	(United Kingdom) Sarah Playfair	Mygale SJ01	10
(United Kingdom) ?	48	(United Kingdom) Sarah Playfair	Van Diemen RF??	9
(United Kingdom) Kart Start	16	(United Kingdom) Ryan Cannon	Van Diemen RF03	2-10
(United Kingdom) Camsport	21	(South Africa) Armani Jamrozinski	Van Diemen ?	1-6
(United Kingdom) ?	27	(Lebanon) Basil Shaaban	MDR RF03	5
(United Kingdom) Jamun Racing	33	(Republic of Ireland) Charlie Donnelly	Mygale SJ04	1–8, 10
(United Kingdom) Jamun Racing	88	(United Kingdom) Julian Yap	Mygale SJ03	1–2, 4–8, 10
(United Kingdom) Myerscough College	39	(United Kingdom) James Gleave	Mygale SJ2000	All
(United Kingdom) Myerscough College	83	(United Kingdom) David Wandless	Van Diemen RF03	1-6
(United Kingdom) Marque Cars	40	(Japan) Rei Yamaguchi	Ray GRSZ	1–3, 5, 7
(United Kingdom) ?	43	(Finland) Juho Annala	Van Diemen RF03	10
(United Kingdom) ?	85	(South Africa) Cristiano Morgado	Mygale SJ2001	10

== Race calendar and results ==
Round		Circuit	Date	Pole position	Fastest lap	Winning driver	Winning team
9	R1	(United Kingdom) Donington Park (Grand Prix)	4 April	(United States) Charlie Kimball	(Republic of Ireland) Charlie Donnelly	(Republic of Ireland) Charlie Donnelly	(United Kingdom) Jamun Racing
9	R2	(United Kingdom) Donington Park (Grand Prix)	4 April	(United States) Charlie Kimball	(Finland) Valle Mäkelä	(Finland) Valle Mäkelä	(United Kingdom) Nexa Racing
2	R3	(United Kingdom) Croft Circuit	2 May	(Finland) Valle Mäkelä	(Finland) Valle Mäkelä	(Finland) Valle Mäkelä	(United Kingdom) Nexa Racing
2	R4	(United Kingdom) Croft Circuit	2 May	(Finland) Valle Mäkelä	(Finland) Valle Mäkelä	(Finland) Valle Mäkelä	(United Kingdom) Nexa Racing
5	R5	(United Kingdom) Knockhill Racing Circuit	16 May	(Republic of Ireland) Charlie Donnelly	(United Kingdom) Dan Clarke	(Republic of Ireland) Charlie Donnelly	(United Kingdom) Jamun Racing
5	R6	(United Kingdom) Knockhill Racing Circuit	16 May	(United Kingdom) Dan Clarke	(United Kingdom) Dan Clarke	(Finland) Valle Mäkelä	(United Kingdom) Nexa Racing
4	R7	(United Kingdom) Snetterton Circuit	6 June	(Finland) Valle Mäkelä	(United States) Joe D'Agostino	(Finland) Valle Mäkelä	(United Kingdom) Nexa Racing
4	R8	(United Kingdom) Snetterton Circuit	6 June	(Finland) Valle Mäkelä	(Sweden) Sebastian Hohenthal	(Finland) Valle Mäkelä	(United Kingdom) Nexa Racing
5	R9	(United Kingdom) Castle Combe Circuit	20 June	(Finland) Valle Mäkelä	(United States) Charlie Kimball	(Finland) Valle Mäkelä	(United Kingdom) Nexa Racing
5	R10	(United Kingdom) Castle Combe Circuit	20 June	(Finland) Valle Mäkelä	(United States) Charlie Kimball	(Finland) Valle Mäkelä	(United Kingdom) Nexa Racing
6	R11	(United Kingdom) Oulton Park (International)	17 July	(United Kingdom) Dan Clarke	(Finland) Valle Mäkelä	(United States) Charlie Kimball	(United Kingdom) Team JLR
6	R12	(United Kingdom) Oulton Park (International)	18 July	(Finland) Valle Mäkelä	(Sweden) Sebastian Hohenthal	(United States) Charlie Kimball	(United Kingdom) Team JLR
7	R13	(United Kingdom) Silverstone Circuit (GP)	15 August	(Finland) Valle Mäkelä	(United States) Joe D'Agostino	(Finland) Valle Mäkelä	(United Kingdom) Nexa Racing
7	R14	(United Kingdom) Silverstone Circuit (GP)	15 August	(Finland) Valle Mäkelä	(Sweden) Sebastian Hohenthal	(United States) Joe D'Agostino	(United Kingdom) Team JLR
8	R15	(United Kingdom) Thruxton Circuit	30 August	(Finland) Valle Mäkelä	(United Kingdom) Dan Clarke	(Japan) Yuya Sakamoto	(United Kingdom) Nexa Racing
8	R16	(United Kingdom) Thruxton Circuit	30 August	(Finland) Valle Mäkelä	(Republic of Ireland) Charlie Donnelly	(Republic of Ireland) Charlie Donnelly	(United Kingdom) Jamun Racing
9	R17	(Belgium) Spa-Francorchamps	12 September	(United Kingdom) Dan Clarke	(Finland) Valle Mäkelä	(India) Sukhjit Sandher	(United Kingdom) Nexa Racing
9	R18	(Belgium) Spa-Francorchamps	12 September	(United States) Charlie Kimball	(United States) Charlie Kimball	(United Kingdom) Dan Clarke	(United Kingdom) Team JLR
10	R19	(United Kingdom) Brands Hatch (Grand Prix)	3 October	(India) Sukhjit Sandher	(Sweden) Sebastian Hohenthal	(Republic of Ireland) Charlie Donnelly	(United Kingdom) Jamun Racing
10	R20	(United Kingdom) Brands Hatch (Grand Prix)	3 October	(India) Sukhjit Sandher	(United Kingdom) Dan Clarke	(Finland) Valle Mäkelä	(United Kingdom) Nexa Racing

== Drivers' Championship ==
Pos.	Driver	DON (United Kingdom)		CRO (United Kingdom)		KNO (United Kingdom)		SNE (United Kingdom)		CAS (United Kingdom)		OUL (United Kingdom)		SIL (United Kingdom)		THR (United Kingdom)		SPA (Belgium)		BRH (United Kingdom)		Pts
1	(Finland) Valle Mäkelä	4	1	1	1	2	1	1	1	1	1	6	2	1	DNS	3	DSQ	5	3	2	1	506
2	(United Kingdom) Dan Clarke	3	3	2	2	3	Ret	Ret	4	2	4	2	Ret	6	14	2	3	2	1	6	3	410
3	(Sweden) Sebastian Hohenthal	2	Ret	Ret	6	5	5	6	2	4	3	3	4	4	3	6	4	4	4	4	2	409
4	(United States) Charlie Kimball	Ret	6	3	3	13	4	2	3	10	2	1	1	5	2	4	7	Ret	2	Ret	4	383
5	(United States) Joe D'Agostino	5	5	8	10	6	3	4	Ret	Ret	12	9	5	2	1	8	2	3	5	10	13	334
6	(Japan) Yuya Sakamoto	15	Ret	Ret	7	4	6	14	5	3	11	Ret	7	3	6	1	5	DNS	7	3	5	282
7	(Republic of Ireland) Charlie Donnelly	1	Ret	4	4	1	Ret	13	Ret	DNS	5	7	8	7	4	7	1			1	Ret	275
8	(United Kingdom) Neil Doran	10	Ret	7	9	8	7	12	6	5	6	4	10	Ret	8	11	6			9	7	236
9	(India) Sukhjit Sandher	6	4	5	5	Ret	2	3	10	Ret	8	Ret	Ret	Ret	5	9	9	1	Ret	Ret	Ret	232
10	(United Kingdom) Ryan Cannon			11	15	9	9	8	11	6	13	12	Ret	10	11	10	8	7	6	7	8	197
11	(United Kingdom) Julian Yap	8	2	9	Ret			7	9	Ret	Ret	8	6	9	9	5	10			Ret	9	185
12	(United Kingdom) James Gleave	Ret	10	Ret	Ret	12	11	9	12	8	9	13	DNS	13	12	13	11	8	9	13	14	146
13	(United Kingdom) Stuart Gough			10	12	7	8	5	7	11	Ret	5	3									135
14	(United Kingdom) David Wandless	7	12	6	11	11	Ret	11	8	7	7	10	9									132
15	(United Kingdom) Robert Sunderland	13	9	14	17	Ret	DSQ	10	Ret	Ret	Ret	11	DNS	12	10	12	12	6	10	8	10	126
16	(South Africa) Armani Jamrozinski	12	7	13	16	14	14	Ret	DNS	9	10	Ret	Ret									54
16	(Colombia) Alexis Sabet	14	11	15	14	Ret	12	Ret	13	12	Ret	14	Ret	11	13	Ret	DNS	DNS	Ret	Ret	Ret	49
18	(Japan) Rei Yamaguchi	11	8	12	13	10	13			Ret	DNS			Ret	Ret							48
19	(United Kingdom) Matt Howson	9	Ret	Ret	8																	26
guest drivers ineligible for points
	(Finland) Juho Annala																			5	6	0
	(United Kingdom) Richard Keen													8	7							0
	(United Kingdom) Sarah Playfair					Ret	10											9	8	12	12	0
	(South Africa) Cristiano Morgado																			11	11	0
	(United Kingdom) Andrew Bentley			Ret	Ret																	0
	(Lebanon) Basil Shaaban									Ret	DNS											0
Pos.	Driver	DON (United Kingdom)		CRO (United Kingdom)		KNO (United Kingdom)		SNE (United Kingdom)		CAS (United Kingdom)		OUL (United Kingdom)		SIL (United Kingdom)		THR (United Kingdom)		SPA (Belgium)		BRH (United Kingdom)		Pts

Colour	Result
Gold	Winner
Silver	Second place
Bronze	Third place
Green	Points classification
Blue	Non-points classification
Blue	Non-classified finish (NC)
Purple	Retired, not classified (Ret)
Red	Did not qualify (DNQ)
Red	Did not pre-qualify (DNPQ)
Black	Disqualified (DSQ)
White	Did not start (DNS)
White	Withdrew (WD)
White	Race cancelled (C)
Blank	Did not practice (DNP)
Blank	Did not arrive (DNA)
Blank	Excluded (EX)
