= 2002 British Formula Ford Championship =

Seasons
- ← 2001 2003 →

The 2002 British Formula Ford Championship was the 27th edition of the British Formula Ford Championship. It commenced on 1 April at Brands Hatch and end on 22 September at Donington Park after 10 rounds and 18 races, all in support of the British Touring Car Championship.

== Drivers and teams ==
Team	No	Driver	Chassis	Rounds
(United Kingdom) Murray Racing	1	(United Kingdom) Craig Murray	Mygale SJ2002	2, 4-6
(United Kingdom) Murray Racing	2	(United Kingdom) Andrew Thompson	Mygale SJ2002	All
(United Kingdom) Murray Racing	3	(United Kingdom) Jeremy List	Mygale SJ2002	All
(United Kingdom) Duckhams Racing with Van Diemen	4	(United Kingdom) Westley Barber	Van Diemen RF02	All
(United Kingdom) Duckhams Racing with Van Diemen	5	(United Kingdom) Stuart Hall	Van Diemen RF02	All
(United Kingdom) Duckhams Racing with Van Diemen	6	(United Kingdom) Mike Conway	Van Diemen RF02	All
(United Kingdom) Duckhams Racing with Van Diemen	7	(Belgium) Jan Heylen	Van Diemen RF02	All
(United Kingdom) Panasonic Batteries Racing Team	9	(Sweden) Alx Danielsson	Van Diemen RF02	1-4, 7, 9-10
(United Kingdom) Panasonic Batteries Racing Team	10	(United Kingdom) Christian England	Van Diemen RF02	All
(United Kingdom) Panasonic Batteries Racing Team	11	(United Kingdom) Tom Kimber-Smith	Van Diemen RF02	All
(United Kingdom) Vitulli Racing	12	(United Kingdom) Michael Vitulli	Mygale SJ2002	1, 4-10
(United Kingdom) Marque Car Racing	16	(United Kingdom) Joey Foster	Ray 2001	All
(United Kingdom) Continental Racing	17	(United Kingdom) Oliver Jarvis	Mygale SJ2002	All
(United Kingdom) Continental Racing	18	(United Kingdom) Tony Rodgers	Mygale SJ2002	1-5
(United Kingdom) Ray Race Car Engineering	19	(India) Sukhjit Sandher	Ray 2001	All
(United Kingdom) Nexa Racing	20	(United Kingdom) Tom Gaymor	Van Diemen RF02	All
(United Kingdom) Nexa Racing	21	(United States) Matthew Koskinen	Van Diemen RF02	All
(United Kingdom) Nexa Racing	22	(Japan) Yuya Sakamoto	Van Diemen RF02	All
?	13	(Republic of Ireland) Joey Greenan	Mygale SJ200	5
?	14	(Republic of Ireland) Paul Dagg	Mygale SJ2000	5
?	15	(United Kingdom) Jamie Smythe	Van Diemen RF01	2
?	23	(Republic of Ireland) George McAlpin	Mygale SJ2002	5
?	24	(Republic of Ireland) Darwin Smith	Mygale SJ2002	5, 9
?	25	(Republic of Ireland) Mark O'Connor	Mygale SJ2001	5
?	26	(Republic of Ireland) Peter Duke	Van Diemen RF02	5
?	27	(Republic of Ireland) Cindy Evans	Vector MG00	5
?	29	(Republic of Ireland) Mike Clyne	Van Diemen RF95	5
?	32	(Republic of Ireland) Shane Dalgetty	Mygale SJ2000	5
?	29	(Republic of Ireland) Charlie Donnelly	Van Diemen RF00	5, 10
?	30	(United Kingdom) James Walker	Van Diemen RF01	6-7, 10
?	31	(United Kingdom) Luke Hines	Van Diemen RF02	7-10
?	34	(Mexico) Mauricio Godínez Castañeda	Van Diemen RF01	9-10
?	35	(United Kingdom) Neil Tofts	Mygale SJ2000	9
?	36	(United Kingdom) Robert Urquhart	Mygale SJ01	10
?	44	(Finland) Valle Mäkelä	Van Diemen RF01	10
?	45	(Republic of Ireland) Alan Dwyer	Van Diemen RF01	5
?	55	(United Kingdom) Alan Kirkaldy	Van Diemen RF99	5
?	69	(Republic of Ireland) John Gunning	Vector MG02	5

== Race calendar and results ==
Round		Circuit	Date	Pole position	Fastest lap	Winning driver	Winning team
1	R1	(United Kingdom) Brands Hatch	1 April	(United Kingdom) Westley Barber	(United Kingdom) Westley Barber	(United Kingdom) Westley Barber	(United Kingdom) Duckhams Racing with Van Diemen
2	R2	(United Kingdom) Oulton Park	21 April	(United Kingdom) Westley Barber	(United Kingdom) Westley Barber	(United Kingdom) Westley Barber	(United Kingdom) Duckhams Racing with Van Diemen
2	R3	(United Kingdom) Oulton Park	21 April		(United Kingdom) Christian England	(United Kingdom) Westley Barber	(United Kingdom) Duckhams Racing with Van Diemen
3	R4	(United Kingdom) Thruxton Circuit	5 May	(United Kingdom) Westley Barber	(United Kingdom) Mike Conway	(United Kingdom) Westley Barber	(United Kingdom) Duckhams Racing with Van Diemen
3	R5	(United Kingdom) Thruxton Circuit	5 May		(United Kingdom) Mike Conway	(United Kingdom) Westley Barber	(United Kingdom) Duckhams Racing with Van Diemen
4	R6	(United Kingdom) Silverstone Circuit	3 June	(United Kingdom) Westley Barber	(United Kingdom) Westley Barber	(United Kingdom) Westley Barber	(United Kingdom) Duckhams Racing with Van Diemen
4	R7	(United Kingdom) Silverstone Circuit	3 June		(United Kingdom) Westley Barber	(United Kingdom) Westley Barber	(United Kingdom) Duckhams Racing with Van Diemen
5	R8	(Republic of Ireland) Mondello Park	23 June	(Belgium) Jan Heylen	(Belgium) Jan Heylen	(Belgium) Jan Heylen	(United Kingdom) Duckhams Racing with Van Diemen
5	R9	(Republic of Ireland) Mondello Park	23 June		(United Kingdom) Mike Conway	(United Kingdom) Christian England	(United Kingdom) Panasonic Batteries Racing Team
6	R10	(United Kingdom) Croft Circuit	14 July	(United Kingdom) Christian England	(United Kingdom) Westley Barber	(United Kingdom) Christian England	(United Kingdom) Panasonic Batteries Racing Team
6	R11	(United Kingdom) Croft Circuit	14 July		(United Kingdom) Westley Barber	(United Kingdom) Christian England	(United Kingdom) Panasonic Batteries Racing Team
7	R12	(United Kingdom) Snetterton Circuit	28 July	(United Kingdom) Christian England	(United Kingdom) Christian England	(United Kingdom) Christian England	(United Kingdom) Panasonic Batteries Racing Team
7	R13	(United Kingdom) Snetterton Circuit	28 July		(United Kingdom) Christian England	(United Kingdom) Christian England	(United Kingdom) Panasonic Batteries Racing Team
8	R14	(United Kingdom) Knockhill Circuit	11 August	(United Kingdom) Christian England	(Belgium) Jan Heylen	(Belgium) Jan Heylen	(United Kingdom) Duckhams Racing with Van Diemen
8	R15	(United Kingdom) Knockhill Circuit	11 August		(United Kingdom) Tom Gaymor	(Belgium) Jan Heylen	(United Kingdom) Duckhams Racing with Van Diemen
9	R16	(United Kingdom) Brands Hatch	26 August	(United Kingdom) Westley Barber	(Sweden) Alx Danielsson	(Belgium) Jan Heylen	(United Kingdom) Duckhams Racing with Van Diemen
10	R17	(United Kingdom) Donington Park	22 September	(United Kingdom) Westley Barber	(United Kingdom) Tom Kimber-Smith	(United Kingdom) Westley Barber	(United Kingdom) Duckhams Racing with Van Diemen
10	R18	(United Kingdom) Donington Park	22 September		(United Kingdom) Westley Barber	(Belgium) Jan Heylen	(United Kingdom) Duckhams Racing with Van Diemen

== Drivers' Championship ==
Pos.	Driver	BHGP (United Kingdom)	OUL (United Kingdom)		THR (United Kingdom)		SIL (United Kingdom)		MON (Republic of Ireland)		CRO (United Kingdom)		SNE (United Kingdom)		KNO (United Kingdom)		BHI (United Kingdom)	DON (United Kingdom)		Pts
1	(United Kingdom) Westley Barber	1	1	1	1	1	1	1	4	3	2	2	10	4	3	3	5	1	2	487
2	(United Kingdom) Christian England	4	2	2	4	Ret	3	3	2	1	1	1	1	1	2	2	2	3	4	461
3	(Belgium) Jan Heylen	2	7	5	3	3	2	2	1	2	3	3	2	Ret	1	1	1	2	1	453
4	(United Kingdom) Mike Conway	3	3	Ret	2	2	Ret	6	3	4	4	4	5	Ret	4	Ret	3	5	7	319
5	(United Kingdom) Tom Gaymor	5	4	4	10	5	6	5	5	6	Ret	DNS	7	8	13	8	DNS	Ret	DNS	232
6	(United Kingdom) Tom Kimber-Smith	12	DNS	Ret	8	7	4	4	20	DNS	5	9	15	3	12	7	6	4	3	226
7	(United Kingdom) Oliver Jarvis	11	11	6	11	9	8	8	7	Ret	6	5	4	5	Ret	5	9	Ret	12	216
8	(United Kingdom) Joey Foster	15	5	3	9	10	10	12	9	5	Ret	7	3	Ret	9	Ret	7	9	11	203
9	(United Kingdom) Stuart Hall	7	DNS	7	7	8	12	11	Ret	DNS	9	6	9	7	6	11	15	8	9	187
10	(Japan) Yuya Sakamoto	9	DNS	10	12	9	14	9	10	11	8	8	12	6	7	12	10	12	13	164
11	(United Kingdom) Andrew Thompson	10	DNS	Ret	Ret	12	9	7	13	7	Ret	Ret	Ret	9	10	4	8	15	8	137
12	(Sweden) Alx Danielsson	6	DNS	DNS	6	4	DNS	DNS					8	Ret			4	6	6	130
13	(United Kingdom) Tony Rodgers	8	6	Ret	5	6	5	10	6	DNS										118
14	(United Kingdom) Luke Hines												6	2	5	10	DNS	7	5	111
15	(India) Sukhjit Sandher	DNS	8	8	13	Ret	11	Ret	15	Ret	10	11	11	Ret	8	14	DNS	17	Ret	83
16	(United Kingdom) Jeremy List	13	10	Ret	14	14	13	Ret	Ret	15	13	12	14	11	11	6	11	13	17	80
17	(United Kingdom) James Walker										12	10	13	10				10	10	50
18	(United States) Matthew Koskinen	14	9	Ret	15	13	Ret	13	18	14	11	13	17	12	Ret	13	DNS	16	Ret	47
19	(United Kingdom) Craig Murray		Ret	Ret			7	Ret	17	Ret	9	Ret								32
20	(Republic of Ireland) Charlie Donnelly								14	9								11	15	23
Guest drivers ineligible for points
	(Republic of Ireland) Peter Duke								11	8										0
	(Republic of Ireland) Darwin Smith								8	13							13			0
	(United Kingdom) Jamie Smythe		Ret	9																0
	(United Kingdom) Alan Kirkaldy														Ret	9				0
	(Republic of Ireland) Mark O'Connor								21	10										0
	(Republic of Ireland) Paul Dagg								19	12										0
	(Republic of Ireland) Alan Dwyer								12	Ret										0
	(United Kingdom) James Taylor																12			0
	(United Kingdom) Michael Vitulli	DNS					15	14	23	Ret	Ret	14	16	13	DNS	15	DNS	19	19	0
	(United Kingdom) Neil Tofts																14			0
	(United Kingdom) Robert Urquhart																	14	14	0
	(Republic of Ireland) Mike Clyne								Ret	16										0
	(United Kingdom) George McAlpin								16	DNS										0
	(Finland) Valle Mäkelä																	Ret	16	0
	(Mexico) Mauricio Godínez Castañeda																DNS	18	18	0
	(Republic of Ireland) John Gunning								22	Ret										0
	(Republic of Ireland) Joey Greenan								24	Ret										0
	(Republic of Ireland) Cindy Evans								NC	DNS										0
	(Republic of Ireland) Shane Dalgetty								Ret	Ret										0
Pos.	Driver	BHGP (United Kingdom)	OUL (United Kingdom)		THR (United Kingdom)		SIL (United Kingdom)		MON (Republic of Ireland)		CRO (United Kingdom)		SNE (United Kingdom)		KNO (United Kingdom)		BHI (United Kingdom)	DON (United Kingdom)		Pts

Colour	Result
Gold	Winner
Silver	Second place
Bronze	Third place
Green	Points classification
Blue	Non-points classification
Blue	Non-classified finish (NC)
Purple	Retired, not classified (Ret)
Red	Did not qualify (DNQ)
Red	Did not pre-qualify (DNPQ)
Black	Disqualified (DSQ)
White	Did not start (DNS)
White	Withdrew (WD)
White	Race cancelled (C)
Blank	Did not practice (DNP)
Blank	Did not arrive (DNA)
Blank	Excluded (EX)
