= British Formula Ford Championship =

Auto racing championship in the United Kingdom

Formula Ford Championship of Great Britain
- Category: Single seaters
- Country: United Kingdom
- Inaugural season: 1976
- Folded: 2014
- Constructors: Mygale, Sinter
- Engine suppliers: Ford
- Tyre suppliers: Dunlop Tyres, Hankook
- Last Drivers' champion: (South Africa) Jayde Kruger
- Last Teams' champion: (United Kingdom) JTR

The British Formula Ford Championship was an entry-level single seater motor racing category, designed to give racing drivers their first step into car racing after karting. Drivers from around the world were attracted to the United Kingdom to compete in the series, and successful Formula One drivers such as Ayrton Senna and Jenson Button won their first single-seater titles in the championship. The championship was run to various Formula Ford regulations over the years, based on the engines provided for the championship by Ford Motor Company. These engine based regulations/specifications include the Ford Kent engine, Ford Zetec engine, Ford Duratec engine and in the final years the Ford EcoBoost engine.

From the 2015 season onwards, the championship was replaced by MSA Formula, which conforms to the FIA's new Formula 4 regulations. Many of the teams and drivers which competed in the final season of British Formula Ford moved to the new series.

== History ==
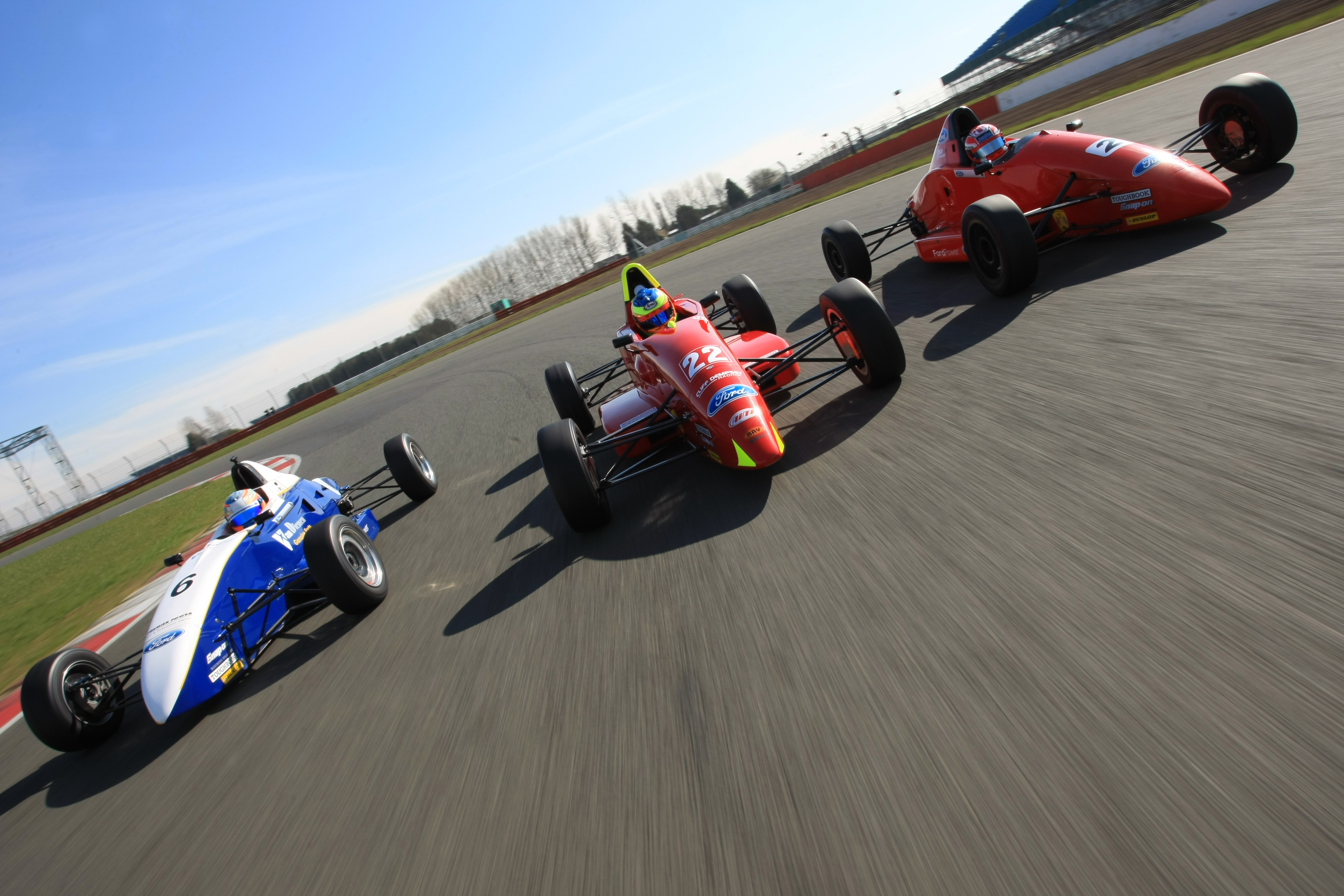
Formula Ford Duratec car from Mygale, Ray and Van Diemen

Although the first British Formula Ford Championship was not held until 1976, Formula Ford's roots are firmly situated in the British racing scene. The first Formula Ford race was held at Brands Hatch in 1967 and was the precursor to the birth of the domestic championship. The first British Formula Ford Championship, held in 1976, was the original Formula Ford Championship which gave birth to many others over the years, including successful championships in Australia and New Zealand.

The championship started out with the 1600cc Ford Kent engine and continued to use it until Ford introduced its newer, more powerful 1800cc Ford Zetec engine. Although this engine change didn't affect the other technical regulations, which still called for steel space frames which were much more economical to build and run compared to their carbon fiber counterparts, the increased engine power accelerated chassis development, causing many of the smaller manufacturers to stop producing cars, resulting in fewer constructors represented in the championship. The Zetec regulations lasted only 12 years up until the Ford Duratec engine was introduced in 2006, providing better handling and power due to its lighter weight even though the specification had returned to 1600cc engines.

The biggest changes to the championship came in 2012 when the latest Ford EcoBoost engine and specification was adopted as the main championship. The EcoBoost car marks a substantial change in the direction of Formula Ford racing as it introduces both smaller capacity Turbocharged petrol engines and for the first time a sequential gearbox.

== The car ==
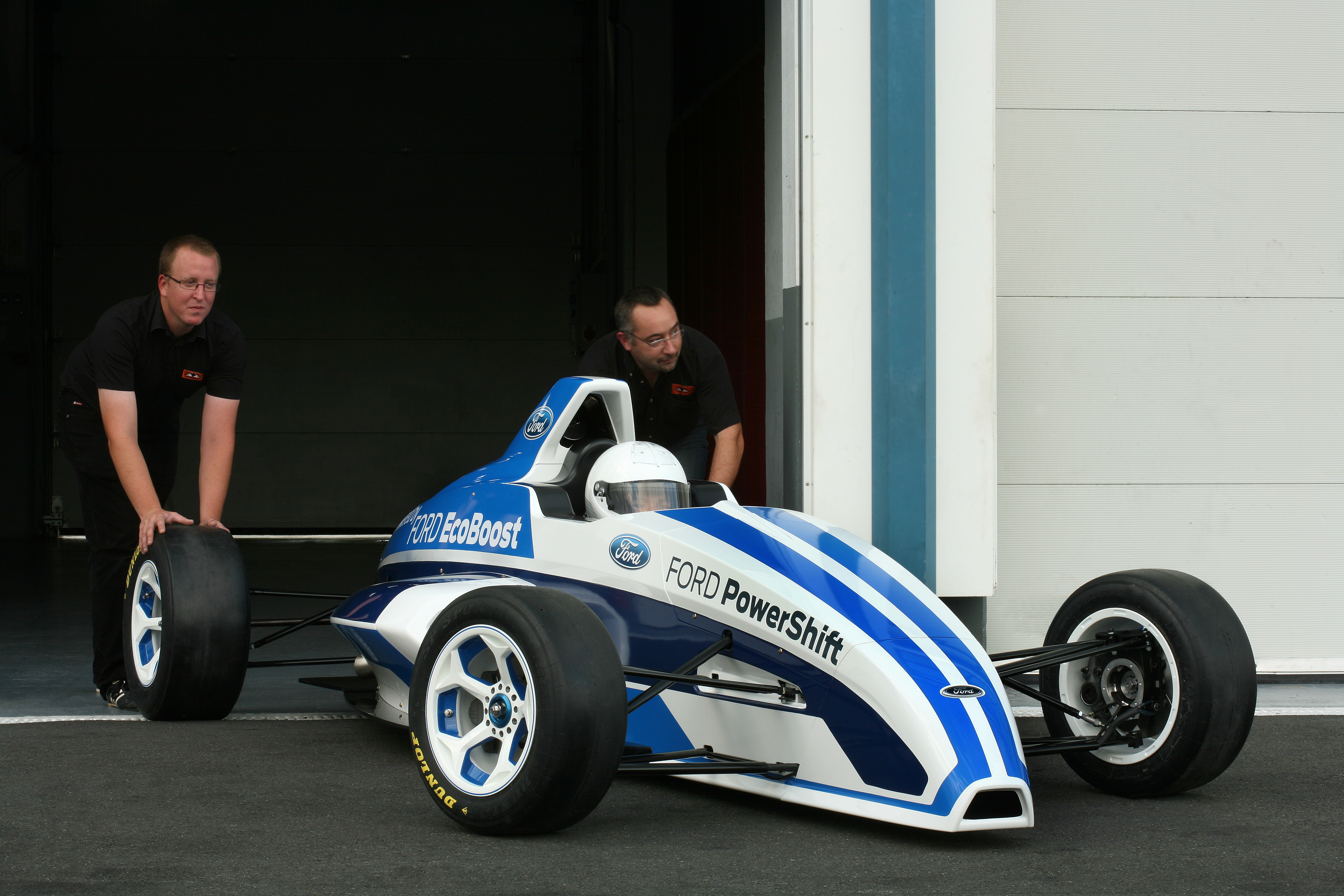
2012 Formula Ford EcoBoost Car

The championship currently allows two specification of Formula Ford car to race: the current generation EcoBoost car and the previous generation Duratec car. The championship is multi-chassis, featuring manufacturers such as Van Diemen and Mygale. To help keep costs low, cars are made from steel, as opposed to the more exotic carbon fibre commonly found in higher categories of racing. The Duratec cars were introduced in 2006, when all the cars in the series were required to use the 1600cc Naturally aspirated Ford Duratec engine which replaced the Ford Kent engine that had been used since the championships inception. Beginning in 2012, the EcoBoost class was introduced to run as the premier class alongside a secondary class for the aging Duratec cars. The EcoBoost class utilises Ford's latest EcoBoost engine which provides greater power thanks to the introduction of a Turbo Charger. The chassis however remains a steel space frame rather than the carbon fibre Monocoque found in other formulae.

From 2015 onwards, the MSA Formula will use Formula 4 regulations. Mygale will continue to provide the carbon-fibre monocoque chassis (As opposed to the Tatuus supplied chassis used in BRDC F4. The engine will be a Ford 1.6L EcoBoost engine as used in the more modern Formula Ford cars, tuned to a maximum of 160 PS. All engines will be tuned by the same race engine preparer, in an attempt to reduce costs. Similarly, all tyres will be provided by Hankook. Sadev will provide the sequential paddle shift transmission and data logging system.

== The Championship ==
From 2013, the championship is composed of 30 rounds held at ten events in support of the British Touring Car Championship. Both EcoBoost and Duratec classes compete in the same races as each other. Drivers who have competed in less than 4 junior formula races in the past are eligible to compete for the Rookie Cup, whilst both Teams and Constructors have separate championships for themselves. The Nations Cup is awarded to the highest placed registered driver from each country excluding UK. In 2015, the series will again run 30 rounds at ten events in support of the BTCC, despite becoming the MSA Formula.

=== Weekend Format ===
A 20-minute qualifying session is used to decide the grid for all the weekend's races. The drivers fastest lap decides the grid for race one, their second fastest time decides the grid for race two and their third fastest time, the grid for race three. All three races will be run over 15 miles.

== Points system ==
=== Current points system ===
Points are awarded to all finishing drivers in each race as well as the driver setting the fastest lap using the following system:

Main Class, Teams Cup & Nations Cup points systems.
1st	2nd	3rd	4th	5th	6th	7th	8th	9th	10th	11th	12th	13th	14th	15th	Others	Fastest lap
30	27	24	22	20	18	16	14	12	10	8	6	4	3	2	1	1

Scholarship Class points system.
1st	2nd	3rd	4th	5th	6th	7th	8th	9th	Others	Fastest lap
20	15	12	10	8	6	4	3	2	1	2

Constructors Cup points system.
1st	2nd	3rd	4th	5th	6th
8	7	6	5	4	3

== Champions ==
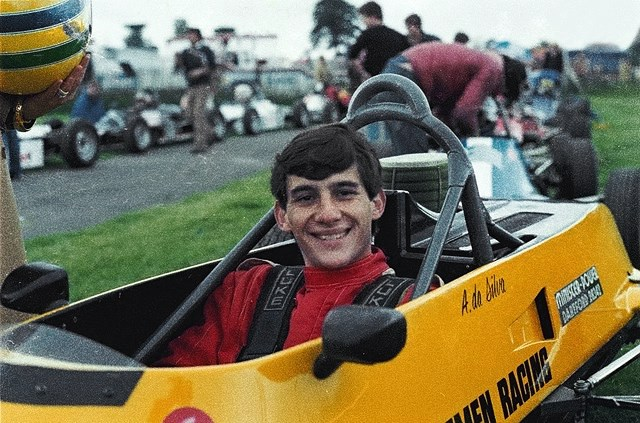
1981 champion Ayrton Senna in his Van Diemen built car

Season	Champion	Constructor	Teams' Champion	Secondary Class	Nations Cup	Winter Series Champion
1976	(Republic of Ireland) David Kennedy	Crossle	Not Held	Not Held	Not Held	Not Held
1977	(South Africa) Trevor van Rooyen	Royale	Not Held	Not Held	Not Held	Not Held
1978	(United Kingdom) Kenneth Acheson	Royale	Not Held	Not Held	Not Held	Not Held
1979	(United Kingdom) David Sears	Royale	Not Held	Not Held	Not Held	Not Held
1980	(Republic of Ireland) Tommy Byrne	Van Diemen	Not Held	Not Held	Not Held	Not Held
1981	(Brazil) Ayrton Senna	Van Diemen	Not Held	Not Held	Not Held	Not Held
1982	(Brazil) Maurício Gugelmin	Van Diemen	Not Held	Not Held	Not Held	Not Held
1983	(United Kingdom) Andrew Gilbert-Scott	Van Diemen	Not Held	Not Held	Not Held	Not Held
1984	(United Kingdom) Dave Coyne	Van Diemen	Not Held	Not Held	Not Held	Not Held
1985	(Belgium) Bertrand Gachot	Van Diemen	Not Held	Not Held	Not Held	Not Held
1986	(United Kingdom) Jason Eliott	Van Diemen	Not Held	Not Held	Not Held	Not Held
1987	(United Kingdom) Eddie Irvine	Van Diemen	Not Held	Not Held	Not Held	Not Held
1988	(Republic of Ireland) Derek Higgins	Van Diemen	Not Held	Not Held	Not Held	Not Held
1989	(Republic of Ireland) Bernard Dolan	Reynard	Not Held	Not Held	Not Held	Not Held
1990	(Netherlands) Michael Vergers	Van Diemen	Not Held	Not Held	Not Held	Not Held
1991	(Belgium) Marc Goossens	Van Diemen	Not Held	Not Held	Not Held	Not Held
1992	(United Kingdom) Jamie Spence	Swift	Not Held	Not Held	Not Held	Winter Series Champion
1993	(Australia) Russell Ingall	Van Diemen	Not Held	Not Held	Not Held	(United Kingdom) Martin Byford
1994	(Denmark) Jason Watt	Vector	Not Held	Not Held	Not Held	(India) Narain Karthikeyan
1995	(Belgium) Bas Leinders	Swift	Not Held	Not Held	Not Held	(Brazil) Vítor Meira
1996	(Denmark) Kristian Kolby	Van Diemen	Not Held	Not Held	Not Held	(Brazil) Ricardo Sperafico
1997	(Netherlands) Jacky van der Ende	Van Diemen	Not Held	Not Held	Not Held	(United Kingdom) Mark Taylor
1998	(United Kingdom) Jenson Button	Mygale	Not Held	Not Held	Not Held	(Netherlands) Ricardo van der Ende
1999	(Denmark) Nicolas Kiesa	Mygale	Not Held	Not Held	Not Held	(United Kingdom) Anthony Davidson
2000	(Australia) James Courtney	Van Diemen	Not Held	Not Held	Not Held	(United Kingdom) Adam Carroll
2001	(Sweden) Robert Dahlgren	Van Diemen	Not Held	Not Held	Not Held	(United Kingdom) Joey Foster
2002	(United Kingdom) Westley Barber	Van Diemen	Not Held	Not Held	Not Held	(Sweden) Alx Danielsson
2003	(United Kingdom) Tom Kimber-Smith	Van Diemen	Not Held	(United Kingdom) James Walker	Not Held	(Sweden) Sebastian Hohenthal
2004	(Finland) Valle Mäkelä	Van Diemen	Not Held	Not Held	Not Held	(United Kingdom) Robert Sunderland
2005	(Republic of Ireland) Charlie Donnelly	Mygale	Not Held	Not Held	Not Held	(United Kingdom) Andrew Bentley
2006	(United Kingdom) Nathan Freke	Mygale	Not Held	Not Held	Not Held	(United Kingdom) David Mayes
Season	Champion	Constructor	Teams' Champion	Scholarship Class	Nations Cup	Winter Series Champion
2007	(United Kingdom) Callum MacLeod	Mygale	Not Held	(United Kingdom) Matt Dobson	Not Held	Not Held
2008	(United Kingdom) Wayne Boyd	Mygale	Not Held	(United Kingdom) Chrissy Palmer	Not Held	Not Held
2009	(United Kingdom) James Cole	Mygale	Not Held	(United Kingdom) Daniel Cammish	Not Held	Not Held
2010	(Australia) Scott Pye	Mygale	Jamun Racing	(United Kingdom) Tristan Mingay	Australia	Not Held
2011	(United Kingdom) Scott Malvern	Mygale	Jamun Racing	(United Kingdom) Cavan Corcoran	Australia	Not Held
Season	Champion	Constructor	Teams' Champion	Duratec Champion	Nations Cup	Winter Series Champion
2012	(Finland) Antti Buri	Mygale	JTR	(United Kingdom) Matt Rao	Finland	Not Held
Season	Champion	Constructor	Teams' Champion	Scholarship Class	Nations Cup	Winter Series Champion
2013	(United Kingdom) Dan Cammish	Mygale	JTR	(United Kingdom) Harrison Scott	Argentina	Not Held
2014	(South Africa) Jayde Kruger	Mygale	JTR	(United Kingdom) Ashley Sutton	South Africa	Not Held

== Other UK Championships ==
Such was the popularity of the formula in the UK over its history; there is an abundance of second hand chassis from previous generations of the championship. This has led to the formation of several other national and club level championships within the UK catering for legacy chassis, engines and cars.

- BRSCC Formula Ford Duratec Championship - Created at the end of 2012, the proposed championship will give a home to the previous generation Duratec class Formula Fords after the British Championship switched solely to the new EcoBoost class.
- Formula Ford 1600 Championships - Operated by the BRSCC, this championship caters for cars built to the Kent specification, utilising the Ford Kent engine. Consisting of two regional and one national championship, it give opportunities for a range of drivers to showcase their talents. A two class structure based around the construction year of the chassis allows a range of different chassis to remain competitive.
- Several Club level championships are also arranged. Of note include the Monoposto Racing Club Championship, the 750 Motor Club Formula 4 championship , the Castle Combe Formula Free championship and the Classic Formula Ford Championship.

=== Formula Ford Festival ===
The Formula Ford Festival is an annual meeting of Ford powered single seat racing cars which is held at the end of the British racing season, at the Brands Hatch motor racing circuit in the county of Kent, in Southern England. The events are held over the course of a weekend and although various classes of past and present Formula Fords are present, the high point for many is the championship in which young but skilled drivers from Ford competitions in Europe and beyond race against one another. Often it is a rare chance to compare the skills of drivers who take part in different Ford competitions around the world. The event is administered by the British Racing and Sports Car Club.
