= Van Diemen =

British race car manufacturer

Van Diemen International, Ltd.
- Industry: Automotive
- Founded: 1973
- Founder: Ross Ambrose; Ralph Firman Sr.
- Defunct: 2002
- Fate: Absorbed into Élan Motorsport Technologies
- Headquarters: Snetterton, Norfolk, United Kingdom
- Parent: Élan Motorsport Technologies (as of 2002)

Van Diemen International, Ltd. was a British race car manufacturer based in Snetterton, Norfolk, United Kingdom. The company had a reputation for high-volume production runs of its cars, the most well-known of which is its series of Formula Ford chassis, which have been at the forefront of that class of motorsport for over 20 years and led it to becoming the largest manufacturer of bespoke racing cars in the world.

As well as Formula Ford, Van Diemen built cars for Formula Ford 2000, Sports 2000 and Star Mazda series. The company's purpose-built manufacturing facility was located on the grounds of Snetterton Motor Racing Circuit, allowing racing teams to test the cars right off the production line.

== History ==
(United Kingdom) Van Diemen
- Founded: 1977
- Folded: 2002
- Team principal(s): Ross Ambrose; Ralph Firman Sr.
- Former series: British Formula Ford; Eurocup Formula Renault; British Formula Renault
- Noted drivers: (United Kingdom) Eddie Irvine (Australia) Mark Webber (United Kingdom) Dan Wheldon (United Kingdom) Mike Conway
- Drivers' Championships: 1981 BRSCC Formula Ford 1600; 1981 RAC Formula Ford 1600; 1981 Formula Ford Festival; 1984 RAC Formula Ford 1600; 1987 Formula Ford Festival; 1989 Formula Ford BRDC; 1989 Formula Ford Festival; 1990 British Formula Ford; 1991 Formula Ford Festival; 1991 Eurocup Formula Renault; 1992 Formula Ford Festival; 1993 British Formula Ford; 1993 Formula Ford Festival; 1995 Formula Ford Festival; 1996 Formula Ford Festival; 1997 Formula Ford Festival; 1999 Formula Ford Festival; 1997 British Formula Ford; 2000 British Formula Ford; 2001 British Formula Ford; 2002 British Formula Ford; 2002 Formula Ford Festival

Van Diemen was founded in 1973 by Ross Ambrose and Ralph Firman Sr., whose children Marcos Ambrose, Ralph Firman Jr. and Natasha Firman have since gone on to have successful racing careers. The company's name comes from the island of Tasmania, Australia, which was formerly known as Van Diemen's Land and is where Ambrose was born and lived before moving to the UK to co-found the company.

=== 1970s ===
The first car produced was the Van Diemen FA73. In 1973, Derek Lawrence won the BRDC Formula Ford 1600 championship in a FA73. The BRSCC Formula Ford was also won by a FA73. This car was driven by Donald MacLeod. South African Kenny Gray won the Scottish Formula Ford Championship in 1974 in a Van Diemen RF74. Chico Serra won the BRSCC championship in 1977 driving a Van Diemen. Serra went on to win the Formula Ford Festival that season, beating two Royale's. The British car maker took over Group Racing Developments, a producer of Formula 3 chassis, at the end of 1975. A Van Diemen VG376 was entered in the British Formula 3 in 1976 and 1977. The car was a GRD 375 with updated aerodynamics. Jac Nellemann scored the best result for the car at Circuit Zolder scoring a fourth-place finish. The car manufacturer would return to Formula 3 in 1992. 1977 marked the start of a long time relationship with Duckhams Oil, which sponsored the factory team until 2002.

=== 1980s ===
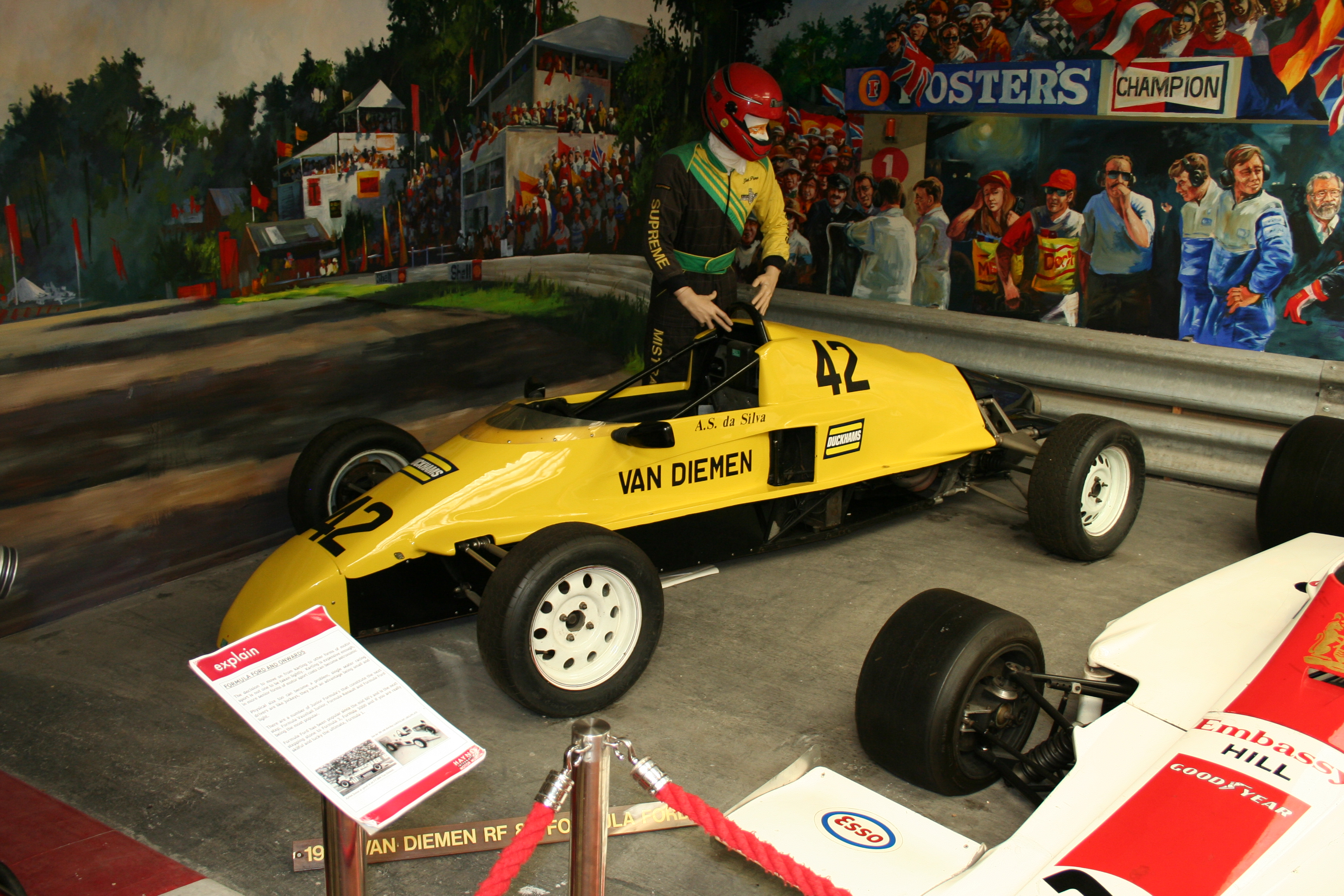
Van Diemen RF84 Formula Ford

Van Diemen swept the BRSCC Formula Ford 1600 championship in 1980. Brazilian drivers Roberto Moreno and Raul Boesel won 13 out of 14 races and finished one and two in the standings. Jonathan Palmer, also driving Van Diemen, was third in the standings. Moreno went on to win the Formula Ford Festival followed by Tommy Byrne, also driving a Van Diemen. Byrne had a very successful 1981 season winning the Festival, European and British Formula Ford 2000 championships, all driving cars made by the British car maker. Ayrton Senna made his European racing debut in 1981 in the BRSCC and RAC Formula Ford 1600 championships, driving Van Diemen chassis. After winning these two championships he graduated into Formula Ford 2000, again driving Van Diemens. In 1982, Senna won both the British and European Formula Ford 2000 championships. The following year fellow Brazilian Maurício Gugelmin finished second in the British Formula Ford 2000 driving a Van Diemen. In the same year, Maurizio Sandro Sala won the BRDC Formula Ford 1600. In 1985, eight Van Diemens filled the top ten at the Formula Ford Festival. Jonathan Bancroft was the best placed driver finishing second. The race was won by Johnny Herbert driving a Quest-Ivey FF85. Halfway through the eighties Reynard chassis started to dominate the Formula Ford 2000. Van Diemen shifted its focus toward Formula Renault, also a 2-litre engine formula. The Formula Ford Festival was won four consecutive times from 1986 thru 1989 by Van Diemen chassis. Roland Ratzenberger (1986) and Vincenzo Sospiri (1988) won the race in customer entries. The factory team won the race in 1987 and 1989 with Eddie Irvine and Niko Palhares. The British constructor made its debut in the Formula Renault in 1989. Neil Riddiford won the first British Formula Renault championship in 1989, driving a Van Diemen.

=== 1990s ===
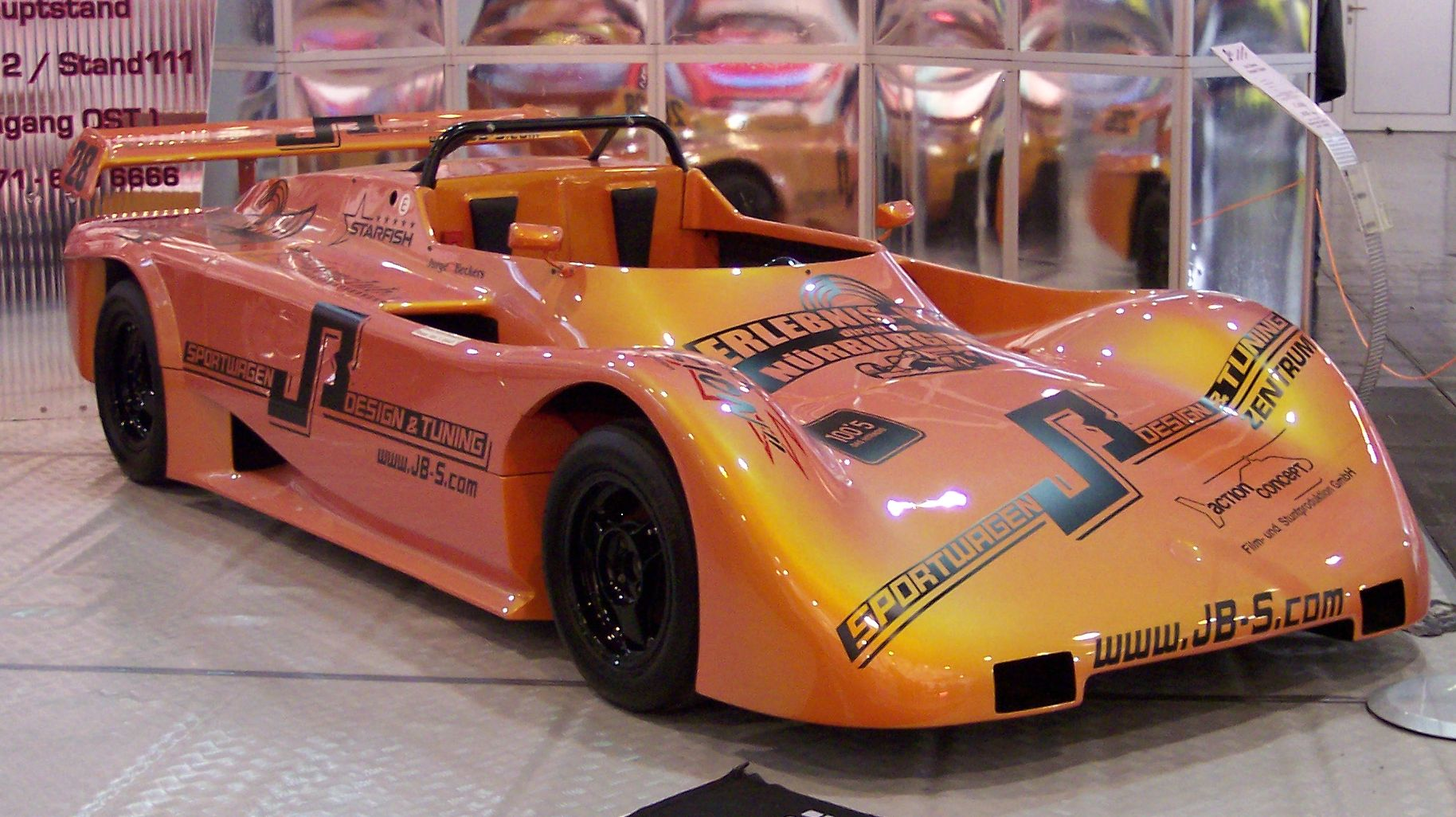
Van Diemen Multisport

Throughout the 1990s, Van Diemen began to dominate the Formula Ford market. Throughout the decade the constructor won the British Formula Ford championship five times and the Festival seven times. Jason Plato won the first Formula Renault Eurocup driving for the Duckhams Van Diemen factory team. Bobby Verdon-Roe won the British Formula Renault in 1991 in a customer entered Van Diemen. The 1991 season marked the debut of the Formula Vauxhall Junior spec racing series. Because of Van Diemens success in the Formula Ford, the marque was contracted to build all Formula Vauxhall Junior cars for the 1991 season. This racing car did not use aerodynamic features like wings, but used slick tires. The first championship was won by future IndyCar driver Dario Franchitti. For 1992, Van Diemen re-entered the Formula 3 market. This was the first composite chassis baring the Van Diemen name, it was built by Precision Composites. The car raced in the Japanese F3, German F3 and the French F3 championships. Franc ten Wolde raced in five races of the German F3 in a Mugen powered RF92 entered by Dutch racing team Nomag Racing. Ten Wolde finished once, in eleventh place. Nomag entered Ten Wolde in the 1992 Masters of Formula 3 where he finished thirteenth. The Honda powered cars entered in the Japanese F3 and French F3 had little success entering only a few races. After this disappointing season Van Diemen did not return to Formula 3. With the demise of Formula Ford 2000, Van Diemen began to export its cars to the United States. 1992 was a successful year for Van Diemen in the American F2000 series. Greg Ray won the SCCA F2000 championship. Back in Europe James Matthews, driving for Manor Motorsport, won the 1994 Formula Renault Eurocup in a Van Diemen. Van Diemen cars won the first two official USF2000 championships in 1995 and 1996 with Jeret Schroeder and Steve Knapp. Van Diemen dominated the series winning all drivers and constructors titles until the series folded after the 2006 season. Many aspiring drivers won races with the British brand like Buddy Rice and Dan Wheldon. The constructor continued to win in the British Formula Renault winning the title again in 1995 with Guy Smith. The following seasons the Van Diemen chassis became less successful in Formula Renault. Competition from Mygale, Tatuus and other smaller chassis manufacturers prevented Van Diemen from being competitive in the Eurocup. The cars remained competitive in the British championship fighting for the title against factory entered Tatuus chassis. 1998 marked the final year for Van Diemen in Formula Renault with Tim Mullen and Vítor Meira finishing third and fourth in customer entered cars. As of 1998 Van Diemen was contracted to build all the cars for the Formula Palmer Audi championship which ran until 2010.

=== 2000s ===
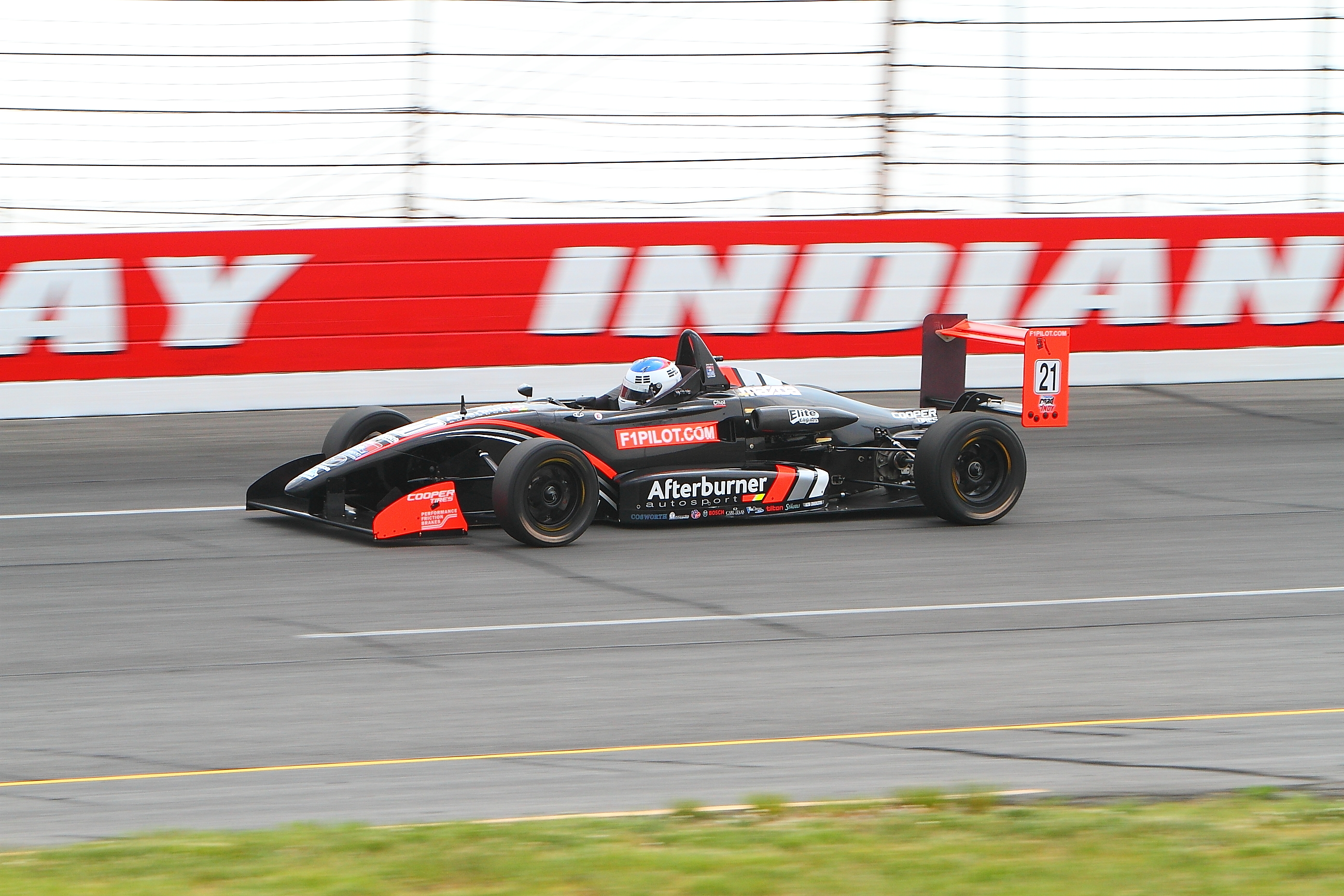
Élan Van Diemen DP08 USF2000

Factory drivers Robert Dahlgren, James Courtney and Westley Barber won the British Formula Ford championship in 2000, 2001 and 2002. In 2002, Van Diemen International was bought by Don Panoz and became part of his Élan Motorsport Technologies group out of Braselton, Georgia. As of 2002, the factory team ceased to exist. Tom Kimber-Smith and Valle Mäkelä won the British Formula Ford title, in customer entries, in 2002 and 2003. 2003 would be the last time a Van Diemen chassis would win the overall British Formula Ford title. With the takeover by Élan, Van Diemen became more active in the United States. The Van Diemen FR02 used in Formula Ireland and Formula X between 2001 and 2004 was introduced in the United States. The SCCA formed the Formula SCCA class which solely uses this chassis. This later developed in the Formula Enterprises. Van Diemen also built a sports racer version of this car, the DP04. When the Star Mazda championship announced a new car they contracted Élan Van Diemen to design and built it, the car was introduced in 2004. The IMSA Lites championship started in 2006, this class comprised three subclasses, L1, L2 and L3. The L1 class uses a Élan Van Diemen built DP02 with a Mazda engine. Short lived L3 class used the DP06 Van Diemen designed before. The cars for the L2 class were not Van Diemen built but a West WX10 and later WR1000. Van Diemen designed its last Formula Ford car in 2008. Some teams updated the chassis to make their own Formula Ford cars like Fluid Motorsport.

=== 2010s ===
The USF2000 was revived for the 2010 season as spec racing series. Élan Van Diemen was contracted to build all the cars for the Mazda powered championship. But by now the Van Diemen activities have been fully incorporated into Élan Motorsport Technologies. Every new car will bear the Élan name instead of Van Diemen, so the highly successful marque will gradually disappear. After the demise of Van Diemen, Ralph Firman Sr. founded a new race car constructor: Ralph Firman Racing.

== Gallery ==
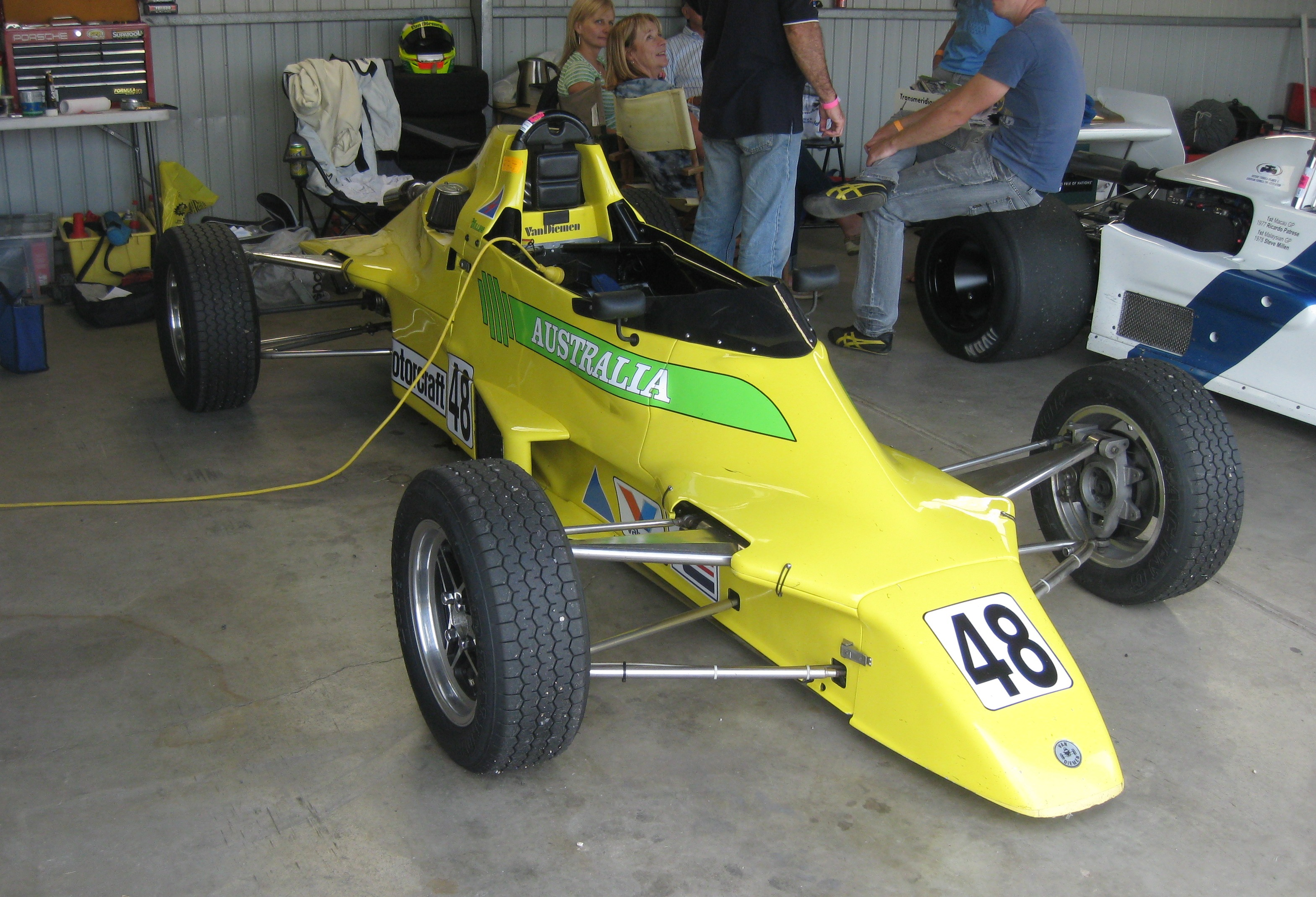
Van Diemen RF86 Formula Ford

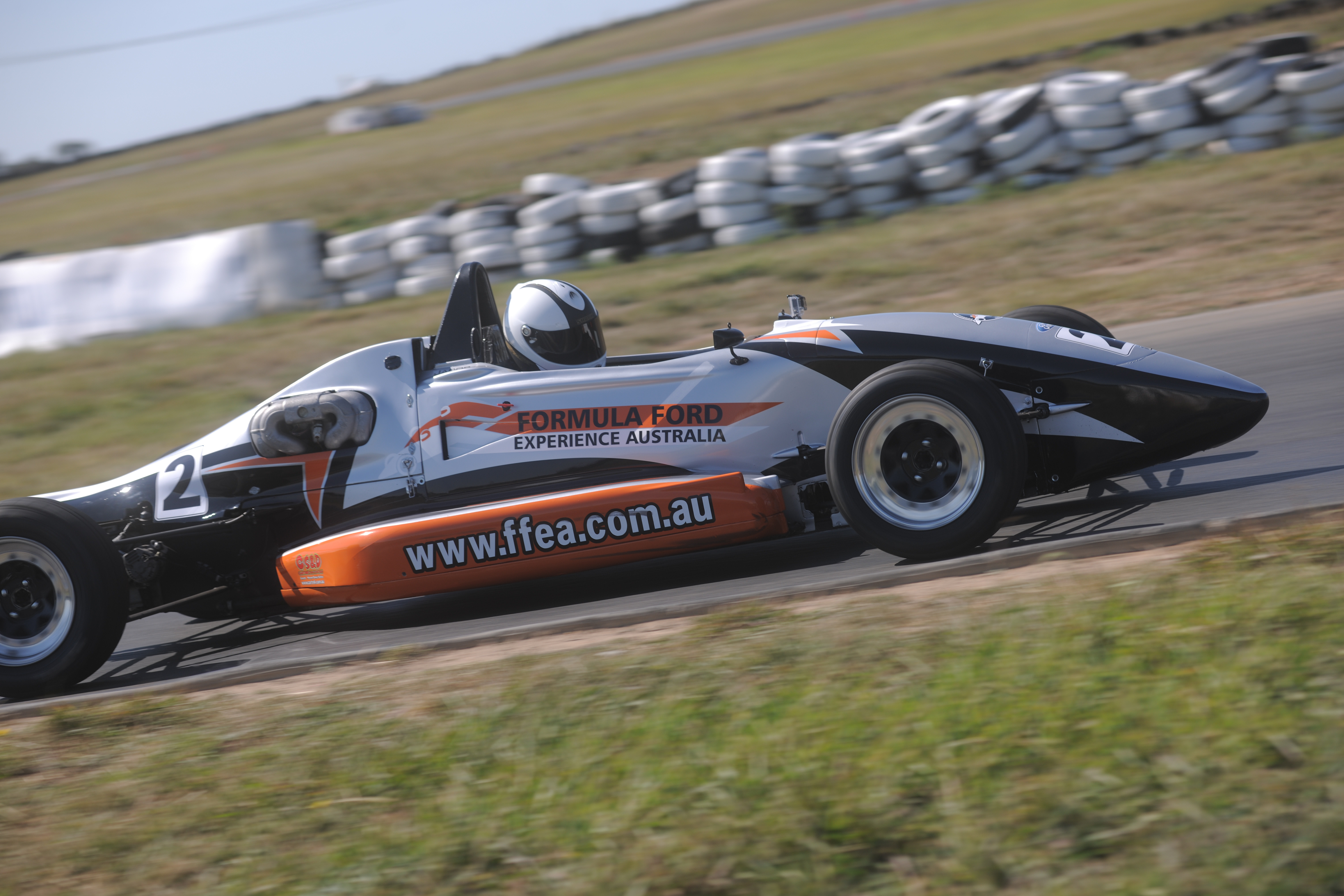
Van Diemen RF01 Formula Ford

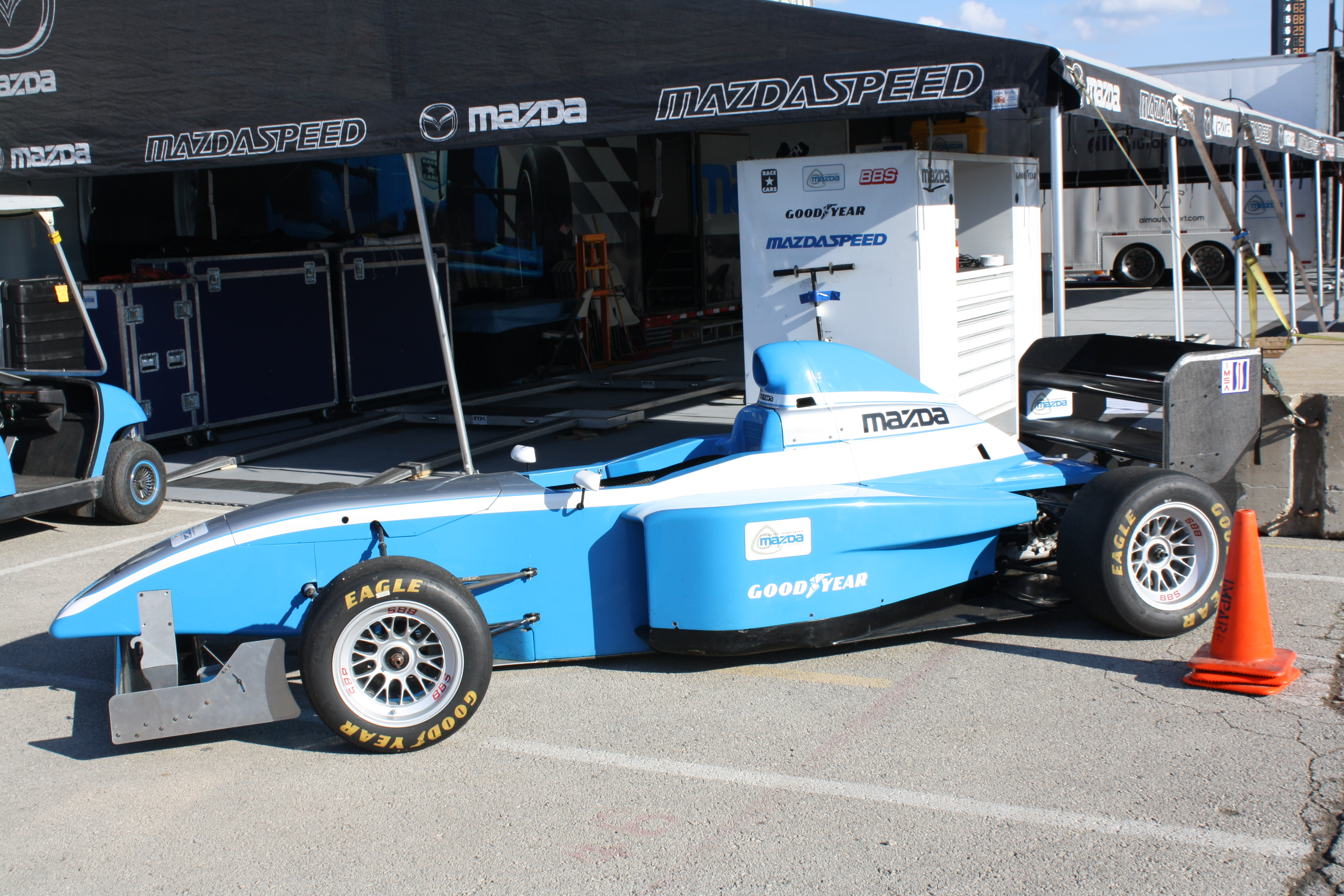
Star Mazda

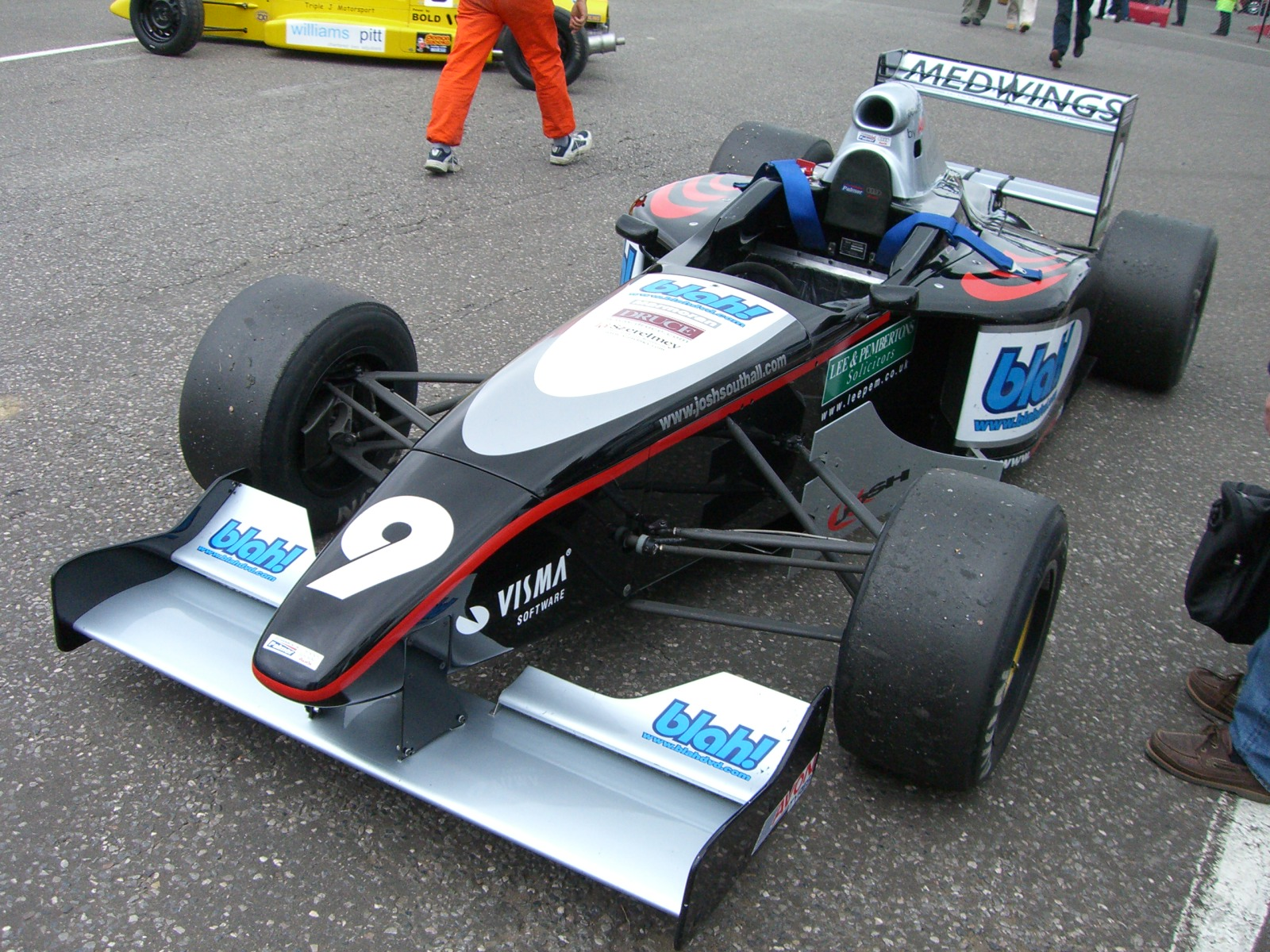
Formula Palmer Audi

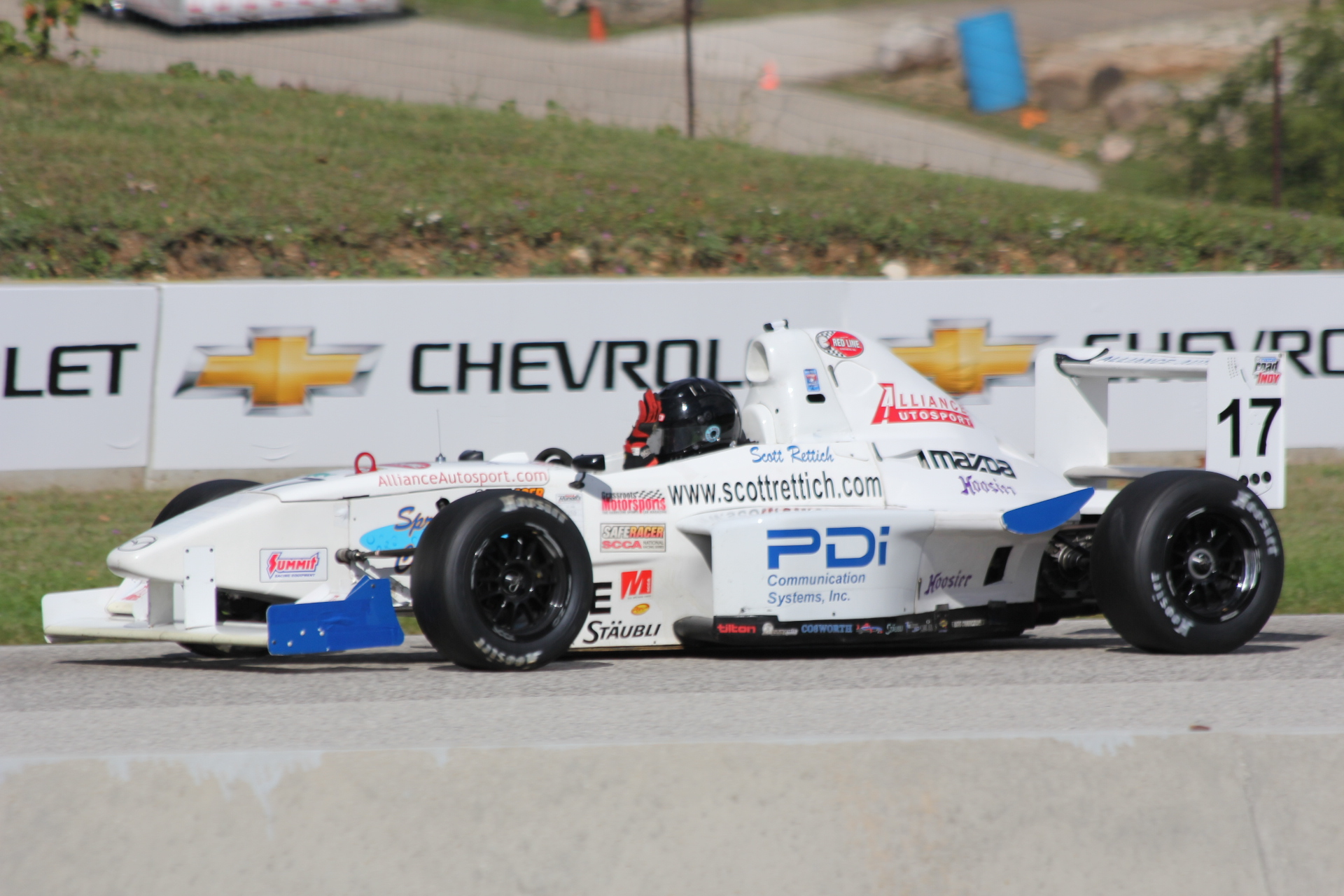
Formula Enterprises

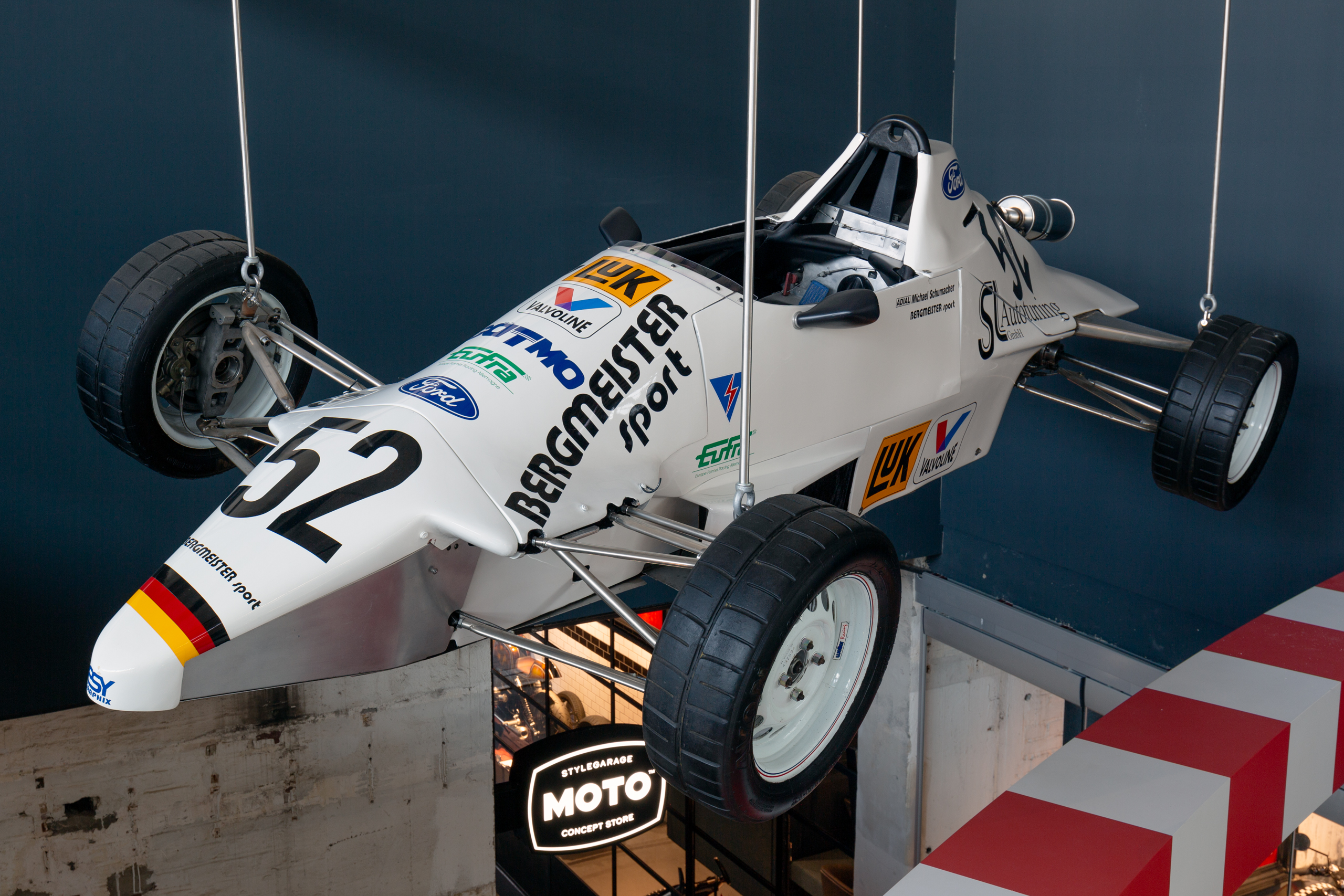
Van Diemen RF88 of Michael Schumacher (Formula Ford)

== See also ==
- Anson Cars
- Crosslé Car Company
- Reynard Motorsport
- Swift Engineering
