= Mygale FR98 =

- Category: Formula Renault 2.0 Eurocup
- Constructor: Mygale

Technical specifications
- Chassis: Steel spaceframe
- Suspension: Double wishbones, coil springs over shock absorbers, anti-roll bars
- Engine: Mid-engine, longitudinally mounted, 2.0 L (122.0 cu in), Renault F4R 832, DOHC I4, N/A
- Transmission: Hewland LD200 4-speed manual
- Power: 147 hp (110 kW)
- Weight: ~ 500 kg (1,100 lb)
- Brakes: Disc brakes
- Tyres: Michelin

Competition history

The Mygale FR98 is an open-wheel formula race car chassis, designed, developed, and built by French manufacturer and race car constructor Mygale, for Formula Renault 2.0 Eurocup, in 1998.
