= Mygale SJ97 =

- Category: Formula Ford
- Constructor: Mygale; Solus

Technical specifications
- Chassis: Steel spaceframe
- Suspension: Double wishbones, coil springs over shock absorbers, anti-roll bars
- Engine: Mid-engine, longitudinally mounted, 1.6 L (97.6 cu in), Ford, DOHC I4, N/A
- Transmission: Hewland LD200 4-speed manual
- Power: 140 hp (104 kW)
- Weight: 515 kg (1,135 lb)
- Brakes: Disc brakes
- Tyres: Avon

Competition history

The Mygale SJ97 is an open-wheel formula race car chassis, designed, developed, and built by French manufacturer and race car constructor Mygale, for Formula Ford race categories, in 1997.
