= List of Canadian Formula Fords =

Several Formula Ford racing cars have been designed or built in Canada.

Name	Designed or built by	Notes
Aero	Dobroslov Hajek (1)	
Aero 2	Ed Caroll, Ian Willis, Keith Willis (2)	based on the Aero
Ash	Wayne Pinney (2)	002 Driven by Ron Fellows, 003 by Randy Packham
Chinook	Fejer	
Ferret	Alec Purdy, Fred Wilken	first model built in 1970; Mk IV model built in 1973 still competitive
Franklin		
Harfang	Jacques Dulac, Alain Dulac	
Hayman	Roy Hayman (2)	
Jonak	Mark Jonak, Vladimir Jonak	models 86 and 86B, built in 1986
Adler P1/P14	Percy Adler / Adler Metal Works http://www.percyadler.ca/cars.html	First FF version built 1981, followed by a SuperVee and several FF2000 designs. The last version (Adler P14) is currently being restored as a Formula Ford 1600 for 2020.
Magnum Cars	Jean-Pierre St-Jacques	Mk I built in 1970; Mk II built in 1971; Mk III built in 1972; Mk IV built in 1989 (a Magnum Mk III was driven to the 1973 Quebec Formula Ford championship by Gilles Villeneuve)
Monoplace CMV	Jacques Cadorette, Marc Montmigny, Mario Villenuve	
Patterson	Mark Patterson	one example, built in Belcarra, BC in 1976
Pulsar	Bob McCallum	modeled after Crossle 32F
Tsunami	Bob McCallum, Rob Keur	2 built; first one completed in 1984
Xpit	Eric Siegrist	the name is pronounced speet
