= Westley Barber =

British motor racing driver (born 1982)

- Nationality: (United Kingdom) British
- Born: 19 January 1982 (age 44) Hitchin, Hertfordshire, England
- Categorisation: FIA Bronze

Previous series
- 2008 2005 2005 2004 2003 2001–2002 2000 1999 1998: British Formula Ford; Formula Renault Eurocup; Formula Renault France; Formula Renault UK; Formula Ford 2000 USA; British Formula Ford; British Formula 3 French Formula 3 Formula Renault Campus France

Championship titles
- 2002 1998: British Formula Ford; Formula Renault Campus France

Awards
- 2006 1999: Member of the British Racing Drivers Club; Autosport BRDC Award (finalist)

Westley Barber (born 19 January 1982) is a British racing driver who was the 2002 British Formula Ford and 1998 French Formula Renault Campus champion.

== Career ==
Barber began racing in the Formula Renault Campus series in France. He won the title with six victories in the ten races across the year. He graduated to French Formula 3 for 1999 and drove for La Filière Elf finishing fourth in the class B series. He was a nominated finalist for the Autosport BRDC Award that year, but lost out to Gary Paffett.

Barber returned to Britain in 2000, joining Alan Docking Racing for the British Formula 3 season. He would ultimately finish in 14th and a best finish of sixth in the final race at Silverstone. In 2001, he joined British Formula Ford with Haywood Racing and progressed to the Duckhams team for 2002 winning the championship. Of the eighteen races, Barber won eight, including the first seven races of the season. In 2003, Barber moved to the United States to compete in Formula Ford 2000 with Cape Motorsports. He would finish second in the championship behind American racer Jonathan Bomarito.

For 2004, Barber returned to the UK and joined Comtec Racing in Formula Renault UK. He would finish the season in second place, behind future World Endurance Championship victor Mike Conway. He remained with Comtec for 2005 competing in both the French Formula Renault 2.0 series and Formula Renault Eurocup. In France he won one race at Nogaro Circuit. In 2006, he became a full member of the British Racing Drivers Club. Following a number of years away from racing, Barber returned to British Formula Ford in 2008 competing in the 11 race season securing three podiums including a pair of second places at the final round of the season at Brands Hatch.

== Racing Record ==
=== Career Summary ===
Season	Series	Team	Races	Wins	Poles	F/Laps	Podiums	Points	Position
1998	Formula Renault Campus France		10	6	?	?	?	?	**1st**
1999	French Formula 3 Championship	La Filière Elf	14	0	0	0	6	185	4th
2000	British Formula 3 Championship	Alan Docking Racing	11	0	0	0	0	17	14th
2001	British Formula Ford Championship	Haywood Racing	13	0	0	0	2	178	8th
2001	Formula Ford EuroCup	Haywood Racing	5	1	0	1	1	50	**3rd**
2001	Formula Ford Festival	Haywood Racing	1	0	0	0	0	9th	?
2002	British Formula Ford Championship	Duckhams	18	8	6	7	14	487	**1st**
2002	Formula Ford Festival	Duckhams	1	0	0	1	0	0	NC
2003	Formula Ford Zetec Championship Series	Cape Motorsports	11	3	7	?	9	262	**2nd**
2003	Formula Renault UK 2.0 Winter Series	Comtec Racing	4	2	1	1	2	52	**2nd**
2004	Formula Renault UK 2.0 Championship	Comtec Racing	20	6	6	4	11	426	**2nd**
2005	Formula Renault 2.0 Eurocup	Comtec Racing	8	0	0	0	1	16	18th
2005	Formula Renault France 2.0 Championship	Comtec Racing	10	1	1	2	2	52	8th
2008	British Formula Ford	Comtec Racing	11	0	1	0	3	176	12th

=== Complete Eurocup Formula Renault 2.0 results ===
(key) (Races in bold indicate pole position; races in italics indicate fastest lap)

Year	Entrant	1	2	3	4	5	6	7	8	9	10	11	12	13	14	15	16	DC	Points
2005	Comtec Racing	ZOL; 1; 2	ZOL; 2 Ret	VAL; 1; 14	VAL; 2 Ret	LMS; 1 Ret	LMS; 2; 7	BIL; 1; 11	BIL; 2; 11	OSC; 1	OSC; 2	DON; 1	DON; 2	EST; 1	EST; 2	MNZ; 1	MNZ; 2	18th	16
