= Tom Kimber-Smith =

British racing driver

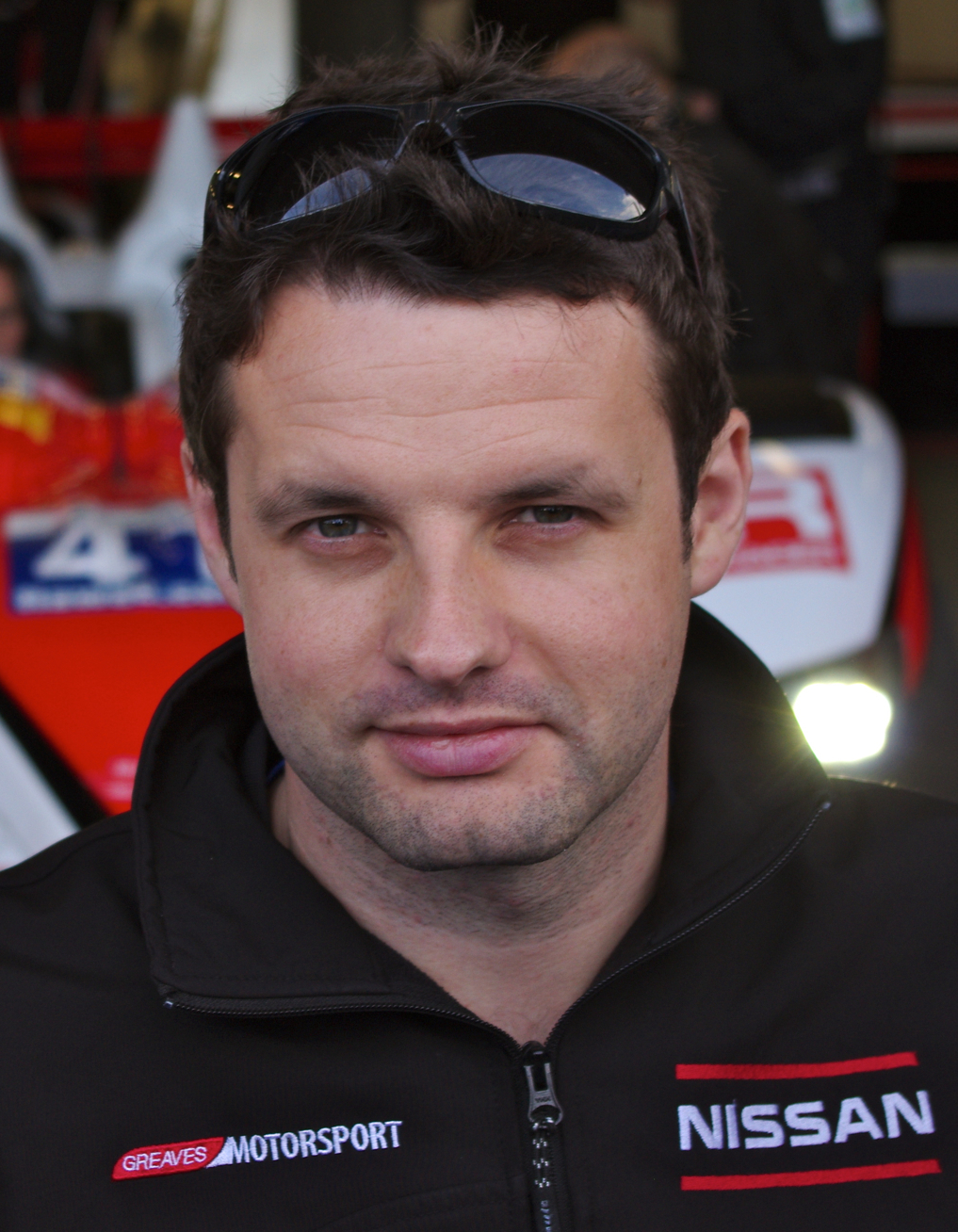
- Kimber-Smith at the 2013 6 Hours of Silverstone
- Nationality: (United Kingdom) British
- Born: Thomas Kimber-Smith; 1 November 1984 (age 42) Ascot, Berkshire, England

European Le Mans Series career
- Debut season: 2012
- Current team: Greaves Motorsport
- Categorisation: FIA Gold
- Car number: 41
- Starts: 7
- Wins: 0
- Poles: 0
- Fastest laps: 0
- Best finish: 13th in 2012

Previous series
- 2006-07 2006, 08 2005 2004 2002-03 2001 2000: Le Mans Series GT2; British GT; Formula Renault UK; Formula 3 Euro Series; Formula Ford UK; Slick 50 FF Championship; T Cars

Championship titles
- 2003: Formula Ford UK

Awards
- 5
24 Hours of Le Mans career
- Years: 2006-2007, 2011-2014
- Teams: Team LNT, Greaves Motorsport, Starworks Motorsport
- Best finish: 7th (2012)
- Class wins: 3 (2006, 2011, 2012)

Thomas Kimber-Smith (born 1 November 1984 in Ascot, Berkshire) is a British race car driver. He last drove the No. 52 PR1/Mathiasen Motorsports Oreca FLM09 in the WeatherTech SportsCar Championship PC class with Robert Alon.

Kimber-Smith has enjoyed success in sportscars, winning both the Le Mans 24 Hours and Le Mans Series LMP2 class for Greaves Motorsport in 2011. He won the LMP2 class again in the 2012 race, driving for Starworks Motorsport with Ryan Dalziel and Enzo Potolicchio in Starworks Motorsport's HPD ARX-03b. He won the 2015 24 hours of Daytona, 12 Hours of Sebring, and Petit Le Mans in the PC class, nearly sweeping the Tequila Patron North American Endurance Cup of the WeatherTech SportsCar Championship in 2015.

Kimber-Smith is the son of Geoff Kimber-Smith, a former driver in the British Touring Car Championship.

== Racing record ==
=== Career summary ===
Season	Series	Team	Races	Wins	Poles	F/Laps	Podiums	Points	Position
2000	T Cars		20	?	?	?	10	?	1st
2001	Slick 50 Formula Ford Championship	Infocus Racing	6	0	0	0	0	0	31st
2002	British Formula Ford	Panasonic Batteries Racing Team JLR	18	0	0	1	2	226	6th
2002	Formula Ford Festival	Panasonic Batteries Racing Team JLR	1	0	0	0	0	N/A	NC
2003	British Formula Ford	Panasonic Batteries Racing Team JLR	20	5	1	1	10	421	1st
2003	Formula Ford Festival	Panasonic Batteries Racing Team JLR	1	0	0	0	1	N/A	3rd
2003	Formula Renault UK Winter Series	Team JLR	4	0	0	0	1	14	15th
2004	Formula 3 Euro Series	Team Kolles	20	0	0	0	0	2	20th
2004	Masters of Formula 3	Team Kolles	1	0	0	0	0	N/A	27th
2005	Formula Renault 2.0 UK	Team JLR	20	0	0	1	1	206	12th
2005	Formula Renault 2.0 Netherlands	Team JLR	2	0	0	0	0	15	25th
2006	British GT Championship	Team LNT	11	2	5	?	11	71	2nd
2006	24 Hours of Le Mans – GT2	Team LNT	1	1	0	?	1	N/A	1st
2006	American Le Mans Series	Team LNT	1	0	0	0	0	14	35th
2007	Le Mans Series – LMGT2	Team LNT	4	0	0	0	0	5	19th
2007	Le Mans Series – LMP2	Team LNT	1	0	1	0	1	8	19th
2007	24 Hours of Le Mans – LMGT2	Team LNT	1	0	0	0	0	N/A	NC
2008	2008 Rolex Sports Car Series – DP	Cheever Racing	5	0	0	0	0	78	32nd
2011	Le Mans Series	Greaves Motorsport	5	3	1	1	4	64	1st
2011	24 Hours of Le Mans – LMP2	Greaves Motorsport	1	1	0	0	1	N/A	1st
2012	FIA World Endurance Championship	Starworks Motorsport	2	0	0	0	0	21	19th
2012	24 Hours of Le Mans – LMP2	Starworks Motorsport	1	0	0	0	1	N/A	1st
2012	European Le Mans Series	Greaves Motorsport	3	0	0	0	1	48	5th
2012	American Le Mans Series – LMP2	Greaves Motorsport	1	0	0	0	0	0	NC
2013	FIA World Endurance Championship – LMP2	Greaves Motorsport	3	0	0	0	0	40	8th
2013	European Le Mans Series – LMP2	Greaves Motorsport	1	0	0	0	0	10	17th
2013	24 Hours of Le Mans – LMP2	Greaves Motorsport	1	0	0	0	0	N/A	11th
2013	American Le Mans Series – GT	CORE Autosport	5	0	0	0	1	32	17th
2014	European Le Mans Series	Greaves Motorsport	3	0	0	0	0	32	9th
2014	24 Hours of Le Mans – LMP2	Caterham Racing	1	0	0	0	0	N/A	11th
2014	United SportsCar Championship – PC	8 Star Motorsports	4	0	0	0	1	107	16th
2014	Continental Tire Sports Car Challenge – GS	Turner Motorsport	12	0	0	0	2	243	7th
2015	United SportsCar Championship – PC	PR1/Mathiasen Motorsports	10	4	1	0	5	313	2nd
2016	IMSA SportsCar Championship – PC	PR1/Mathiasen Motorsports	11	3	0	3	9	355	2nd
2017	IMSA SportsCar Championship – Prototype	PR1/Mathiasen Motorsports	3	0	0	0	0	72	21st

=== Complete Formula 3 Euro Series results ===
(key)

Year	Entrant	Chassis	Engine	1	2	3	4	5	6	7	8	9	10	11	12	13	14	15	16	17	18	19	20	DC	Points
2004	Team Kolles	Dallara F302/076	Mercedes	HOC; 1; 21	HOC; 2 Ret	EST; 1; 7	EST; 2; 21	ADR; 1; 9	ADR; 1 Ret	PAU; 1; 13	PAU; 2; 10	NOR; 1 DSQ	NOR; 1; 21	MAG; 1 Ret	MAG; 2 Ret	NÜR; 1 DSQ	NÜR; 2 DSQ	ZAN; 1; 14	ZAN; 2 Ret	BRN; 1; 18	BRN; 2; 23	HOC; 1; 22	HOC; 2 Ret	20th	2

=== 24 Hours of Le Mans results ===
Year	Team	Co-Drivers	Car	Class	Laps	Pos.	Class Pos.
2006	(United Kingdom) Team LNT	(United Kingdom) Lawrence Tomlinson (United Kingdom) Richard Dean	Panoz Esperante GT-LM	GT2	321	15th	1st
2007	(United Kingdom) Team LNT	(United Kingdom) Danny Watts (United States) Tommy Milner	Panoz Esperante GT-LM	GT2	60	DNF	DNF
2011	(United Kingdom) Greaves Motorsport	(Saudi Arabia) Karim Ojjeh (France) Olivier Lombard	Zytek Z11SN-Nissan	LMP2	326	8th	1st
2012	(United States) Starworks Motorsport	(Venezuela) Enzo Potolicchio (United Kingdom) Ryan Dalziel	HPD ARX-03b	LMP2	354	7th	1st
2013	(United Kingdom) Greaves Motorsport	(United States) Alexander Rossi (United States) Eric Lux	Zytek Z11SN-Nissan	LMP2	307	23rd	10th
2014	(Malaysia) Caterham Racing	(United States) Chris Dyson (United States) Matt McMurry	Zytek Z11SN-Nissan	LMP2	329	25th	11th

=== WeatherTech SportsCar Championship ===
Year	Entrant	Class	Chassis	Engine	1	2	3	4	5	6	7	8	9	10	11	Rank	Points
2014	8Star Motorsports	PC	Oreca FLM09	Chevrolet LS3 6.2 L V8	DAY; 2	SEB; 5	LGA	KAN	WGL; 10	IMS	ELK	VIR	COA	PET; 7		16th	107
2015	PR1/Mathiasen Motorsports	PC	Oreca FLM09	Chevrolet LS3 6.2 L V8	DAY; 1	SEB; 1	LGA; 7	DET; 6	WGI; 2	MOS; 5	LRP; 1	ELK; 4	AUS; 4	ATL; 1		2nd	313
2016	PR1/Mathiasen Motorsports	PC	Oreca FLM09	Chevrolet LS3 6.2 L V8	DAY; 2	SEB; 2	LBH; 6	LGA; 1	DET; 3	WGL; 5	MOS; 3	LIM; 2	ELK; 1	COA; 2	PET; 1	2nd	355
2017	PR1/Mathiasen Motorsports	P	Ligier JS P217	Gibson GK428 4.2 L V8	DAY; 9	SEB; 7	LBH; 5	COA	DET	WGL	MOS	ELK	LGA	PET		21st	72

=== Complete FIA World Endurance Championship results ===
Year	Entrant	Class	Car	Engine	1	2	3	4	5	6	7	8	Rank	Points
2012	Starworks Motorsport	LMP2	HPD ARX-03b	Honda HR28TT 2.8 L Turbo V6	SEB	SPA	LMS; 7	SIL	SÃO	BHR; 8	FUJ	SHA	19th	21
2013	Greaves Motorsport	LMP2	Zytek Z11SN	Nissan VK45DE 4.5 L V8	SIL; 5	SPA; DNS	LMS; 4	SÃO	COA	FUJ	SHA	BHR	8th	40

Sporting positions
Preceded by Tom Boardman	T Cars Champion; 2000	Succeeded by Ben Reeves
Preceded by Westley Barber	British Formula Ford; Champion; 2003	Succeeded by Valle Mäkelä
Preceded by Thomas Erdos; Mike Newton	Le Mans Series LMP2 Champion; 2011 with: Karim Ojjeh	Succeeded by Mathias Beche; Pierre Thiriet; European Le mans Series
