= Joey Foster =

British racing driver

- Nationality: British
- Born: 5 July 1982 (age 44) London, United Kingdom

German Formula Three Championship career
- Current team: HS Technik Motorsport
- Categorisation: FIA Silver
- Car number: 3/4

Championship titles
- 2003 2009: Formula Ford Festival; Australian Formula 3

Joseph Nathaneal Foster (born 5 July 1982 in London) is a British racing driver. He has competed in such series as Le Mans Series, Australian Formula Ford Championship and the German Formula Three Championship. He won the 2009 Australian Drivers' Championship for Team BRM. Foster also won the Formula Ford Festival in 2003 and 2017.

== Career results ==
=== Career summary ===
Season	Series	Team	Races	Wins	Poles	F. Laps	Podiums	Points	Position
2000	Formula Vauxhall		12	3	6	4	6	119	2nd
2001	British Formula Ford Winter Series		5	?	?	?	?	?	1st
2002	British Formula Ford Championship	Marque Car Racing	18	0	0	0	2	203	8th
2003	British Formula Ford Championship	Continental Racing	20	3	1	3	8	394	2nd
2004	Formula Renault 2.0 UK Championship	Motaworld Racing	14	0	0	0	1	170	11th
2005	Formula Ford Zetec Championship Series		12	2	4	4	7	215	2nd
2005	Porsche Carrera Cup Great Britain	Porsche Cars GB	2	0	0	0	0	0	NC
2006	German Formula Three Championship	HS Technik Motorsport	12	4	3	6	6	76	6th
2008	Le Mans Series - LMP2	Embassy Racing	4	0	0	0	0	5	12th
2009	Australian Drivers' Championship - Gold Star	Team BRM	16	7	7	9	14	265	1st
2009	Australian Formula Ford Championship	Team BRM	3	0	0	0	0	0	NC
2009	German Formula Three Championship	HS Technik Motorsport	4	0	0	0	0	0	NC

=== 24 Hours of Le Mans results ===
Year	Team	Co-drivers	Car	Class	Laps	Pos.	Class pos.
2008	(United Kingdom) Embassy Racing	(United Kingdom) Warren Hughes (United Kingdom) Jonny Kane	Embassy WF01-Zytek	LMP2	213	DNF	DNF

Sporting positions
Preceded by James Winslow	Winner of the Australian Drivers' Championship; 2009	Succeeded by Ben Barker
