= Valle Mäkelä =

Finnish motor racing driver (born 1986)

- Nationality: (Finland) Finnish
- Born: Valle-Oskar Mäkelä; 2 February 1986 (age 40) Laitila (Finland)

Previous series
- 2016 2010 2009 2008 2007 2006 2005 2003-2004 2002: Baltic Touring Car Championship; 24H Series; Formula Le Mans; Star Mazda; Formula BMW UK; Formula Renault UK; WTCC; British Formula Ford; Nordic Formula Ford; Finnish Formula Ford

Championship titles
- 2002 2004: Finnish Formula Ford Zetec; British Formula Ford

Valle-Oskar Mäkelä (born 2 February 1986, Laitila, Finland) is a Finnish motor racing driver.

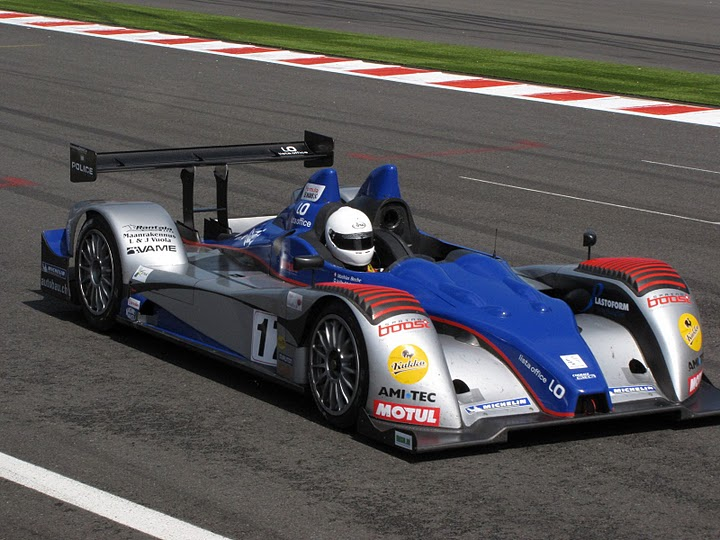
Valle Mäkelä driving the Hope PoleVision ORECA FLM09

== Career ==
Mäkelä began his kart racing career at the age of five. In 2000, he became Finnish Champion in the ICA-J class.

In 2002, Mäkelä began racing in Formula Ford in both the UK and Nordics with some success. In 2003, he finished third in the British Formula Ford Championship class, winning one race and securing a further seven podiums. Remaining with Nexa Racing, Mäkelä won the 2004 British Formula Ford title with 506 points scored over the season, including ten victories. For 2005, he joined GR Asia in the World Touring Car Championship racing a Seat Toledo alongside Tom Coronel. His best result was a 10th-place finish at Silverstone. In 2006, he returned to open wheel racing driving for Manor Motorsport in British Formula Renault. He ended the season in 13th position. In 2007, he returned to Nexa Racing in the Formula BMW UK series and finished 5th in the championship, winning the first race at Brands Hatch.

After completing three races in Star Mazda in the US in 2008, Mäkelä joined the Finnish GT3 Championship winning three races in the No Brakes Motorsport Porsche 997 GT3 Cup S. He would also race Hope PoleVision Racing's Oreca FLM09 in the Formula Le Mans Cup. Over 12 races, he scored two wins and finished 4th in the championship. In 2010, he competed in one race of the 24H Series, finishing third for Westend Racing at the Hungaroring. Mäkelä competed in his first race in six years at the 2016 Riga Summer Race in Baltic Touring Car Championship driving a Lamborghini Gallardo.

== Racing record ==
=== Career summary ===
| Season | Series | Team | Car No. | Races | Poles | Wins | FLaps | Points | Position |
|---|---|---|---|---|---|---|---|---|---|
| 2009 | Formula Le Mans | (Switzerland) Hope PoleVision Racing | 17 | 10 | 0 | 2 | 0 | 140 | 4th |

=== Complete World Touring Car Championship results ===
(key) (Races in bold indicate pole position) (Races in italics indicate fastest lap)

| Year | Team | Car | 1 | 2 | 3 | 4 | 5 | 6 | 7 | 8 | 9 | 10 | 11 | 12 | 13 | 14 | 15 | 16 | 17 | 18 | 19 | 20 | DC | Points |
|---|---|---|---|---|---|---|---|---|---|---|---|---|---|---|---|---|---|---|---|---|---|---|---|---|
| 2005 | GR Asia | SEAT Toledo Cupra | ITA; 1 Ret | ITA; 2; 13 | FRA; 1; 16 | FRA; 2 Ret | GBR; 1; 16 | GBR; 2; 10 | SMR; 1 | SMR; 2 | MEX; 1 | MEX; 2 | BEL; 1; 19 | BEL; 2 Ret | GER; 1; 18 | GER; 2 Ret | TUR; 1 | TUR; 2 | ESP; 1 | ESP; 2 | MAC; 1 | MAC; 2 | NC | 0 |

Sporting positions
| Preceded by Mikko Heino | Finnish Formula Ford; Champion; 2001 | Succeeded by Miikka Honkanen |
| Preceded by Tom Kimber-Smith | British Formula Ford; Champion; 2004 | Succeeded by Charlie Donnelly |
