= Mygale =

Company

Mygale SARL
- Type: Private
- Industry: Motorsport
- Founded: April 31, 1989; 37 years ago
- Founder: Bertrand Decoster
- Defunct: April 10, 2025; 17 months ago
- Fate: Consolidated into Ligier Automotive
- Headquarters: Magny-Cours, France
- Products: Chassis for: Formula BMW; Formula Ford; Formula Three; Formula Renault; Formula Four
- Revenue: 7 Mio€
- Parent: Everspeed
- Subsidiaries: Mygale Inc.
- Website: Mygale's English website

Mygale Racing Car Constructor (Mygale SARL) was a French racing car manufacturer that specialised in the production of single seater chassis for use in formula racing. It is most notable for its Formula Ford chassis. Mygale also produced the chassis used by in Formula Renault, Formula BMW, Formula Three and Formula Four. The company was established in 1989 by Bertrand Decoster and its factory is based in the Technopole of Magny-Cours, France. In 2024 Ligier Automotive bought a majority stake in the company, and in 2025 made it a subsidiary under the name of Ligier Advanced Technologies.

Mygale was a contracted chassis supplier for single-marque formulae, including Formula Renault Campus and Formula BMW. It functions as a manufacturing contractor for BMW's series, with a subsidiary of BMW's US division being responsible for the design.

It also produced cars for open formulae. The company has been involved in Formula Ford since 1989 and has achieved its best results in that category. More recently, it entered the Formula Three market in 2006 and the M-06 and M-07 F3 chassis have appeared in limited numbers in the British, German and European championships. It focussed its efforts on the British series in 2007 in a close partnership with Ultimate Motorsport that yielded fifth place in the teams' standings. In 2012, Mygale supported the SCCA Formula F (Honda and Ford engines) class in the United States with new North American chassis distributor with 2011 Indianapolis 500 champion organization Bryan Herta Autosport as the importer.

Mygale also ran a racing school at the Autodrome de Linas-Montlhéry near Paris. The Formula Mygale centre was set up in 1991 and provides tuition and "driving experiences" in Mygale's own Formula Ford chassis.

== History ==
(France) Mygale
- Founded: 1989
- Team principal(s): Bertrand Decoster
- Former series: French Formula Ford Championship
- Noted drivers: (France) David Pettinari (1990) (France) Jean-Claude Borel (1992) (Canada) Bertrand Godin (1992–1993) (France) Soheil Ayari (1993) (France) Cyrille Sauvage (1995) (Belgium) David Saelens (1996) (Malaysia) Alex Yoong (1996) (France) Eric Dufour (1996) (France) Julien Beltoise (1997–1998) (France) Mathieu Zangarelli (1998–1999) (United Kingdom) Matthew Davies (1998) (France) Tristan Gommendy (1999) (France) Simon Abadie (1999)
- Drivers' Championships: 1995 Eurocup Formula Renault; 1995 French Formula Renault; 1998 French Formula Renault

=== Initial Formula Ford success ===
Mygale SARL was founded by 24-year-old aerodynamics engineer Bertrand Decoster on 31 January 1989. After his study at the École supérieure des techniques aéronautiques et de construction automobile (French wiki) he decided to build the first French Formula Ford car. With Van Diemen, Reynard Motorsports and Swift Cooper dominating the Formula Ford market, Mygale had a hard time breaking through. Mygale started their own racing school at Autodrome de Linas-Montlhéry. The first success came for French-Canadian driver Bertrand Godin. In his factory fielded Mygale he achieved a second place in the championship, scoring two wins. In the 1994 season Godin again was placed second. This time his teammate from the 1993 season, Soheil Ayari won the championship in a Van Diemen. More success for the Mygale chassis came the following season. Fielded by Graff Racing, Patrice Gay won the French and European championships. A Mygale chassis again won the French Formula Ford championship in 1996 with David Terrien. In 1997, two customer Mygales fielded by Haywood Racing entered the British Formula Ford championship. Driver Ricardo Sperafico and Richard Tarling achieved a second and third place in the championship. The duo also finished second and third at the prestigious Formula Ford Festival. More success at the Formula Ford Festival came the following year with Jenson Button winning the title. Button also won the British championship driving a Mygale. Nicolas Kiesa had a very successful 1999 season. Driving a Mygale he won the British championship, was runner-up in the European championship and ended fourth in the Formula Ford Festival.

=== Formula Renault ===
Mygale first entered the Formula Renault market in 1995. Fielding a factory entry they won their first championship in Formula Renault. Cyrille Sauvage won the French Formula Renault Championship and the Formula Renault Eurocup. In 1996 Mygale fielded David Saelens and Alex Yoong in the Formula Renault Eurocup. Saelens ended on the podium four times and secured a second place in the championship. Dufour was Mygales best driver in the Eurocup ending up fourth in the championship. The following season Mygale did not enter the Formula Renault Eurocup which now was dominated by Tatuus and Martini. In the French Formula Renault championship Mygale fielded Julien Beltoise whom achieved three wins and a fourth place in the championship. Mygale returned to the Eurocup and the French championship in 1998 with Beltoise and British driver Matthew Davies. It was a highly successful year. Davies and Beltoise finished one-two in the French championship with third driver Mathieu Zangarelli finishing fourth. In the Eurocup Davies finished second and Beltoise third. In the final year of the open chassis Formula Renault era Mygale fielded three drivers in the French championship. Zangarelli returned for another season alongside Tristan Gommendy and Simon Abadie. Zangarelli won six races and was the runner-up in the championship. Gommendy and Abadie were placed fifth and sixth. The Mygale chassis had its first success in the British Formula Renault Championship Carl Breeze, entered by Haywood, achieved a third place in the championship.

=== Australia ===
Mygale entered the Australian Formula Ford market in 1996. Dugal McDougall entered a Mygale and finished fifth in the championship standings. Mygale won their first Australian Formula Ford Championship race in 1998. Dugal McDougall won the race at Lakeside International Raceway. Greg Ritter, in his third year of Formula Ford, won the 1999 championship, the first Australian Championship win for a Mygale driver. In a close contest, Ritter beat Steve Owen driving a Spectrum and Alex Davison driving a Van Diemen by two points. Luke Youlden won the championship driving a Mygale in 2000. Between 2001 and 2006 Mygale played a marginal role with only a few entries. 2007 was a strong season when it provided the Sonic Motor Racing Services with chassis. Tim Blanchard won the championship and James Moffat was placed second. Both drove 2007 model Mygale Formula Fords. The following years Mygale and Spectrum were the only chassis with full-time entries. Van Diemen played a marginal role. Mygale drivers won the championship in 2008, 2009, 2011, 2012 and 2013. After the 2013 season the national championship was cancelled to be replaced by the Australian Formula Ford Series.

=== USF2000 ===
In 1999, Mygale produced a USF2000 car for the American market. DSTP Motorsports fielded two Mygales, for Bobby Oergel and Ian Lacy. Oergel achieved three podium finishes and Lacy one. The first half of the season was particularly strong. Oergel finished sixth and Lacy 17th in the championship. In 2000 the Mygale chassis were entered in the American Continental Championship class, for cars built before 2000. Tõnis Kasemets drove a Mygale at Road America, here he captured a podium finish in class in the second race. Another Mygale was entered by Jeff Sakowicz at Road Atlanta. At Homestead-Miami Speedway was an unsuccessful season for Mygale in the USF2000. Bryan Sellers and Daniel Muniz were fielded by DSTP Motorsports. But after a disappointing opening race the team switched to Van Diemen. For 2002 Jonathan Urlin was fielded by OTM Motorsports in a new Mygale. It was Mygales most successful season in USF2000 yet, Urlin scored two pole-positions and four podium finishes. The Canadian driver finished behind Sellers and Jeffrey Jones third in the standings. Sakowicz drove a Mygale car at Sebring International Raceway in 2002 and 2003 but without success.

=== Further Formula Ford success ===
After Mygale's departure from Formula Renault Mygale continued in Formula Ford. Mygale scored a one-two finish at the Formula Ford Festival in 2000 with Anthony Davidson and Danica Patrick. Mygale chassis filled the podium in the French championship with Jérémie de Souza winning the title. By now Van Diemen and Mygale dominated the Formula Ford market. In 2001 Mygale chassis again won the French championship and the Formula Ford Festival. Mygale even become more successful in the British Formula Ford after 2004. Mygale won nine consecutive championships in the world's oldest Formula Ford class. When the British Formula Ford switched to the Ford EcoBoost engine Mygale was the sole chassis supplier during the 2012 British Formula Ford season. For the 2013, when the British Formula Ford was introduced to aerodynamic aids, Mygale was joined by Fluid Motorsport entering Sinter LA12 chassis. This season was dominated by Mygale. Radical Sportscars Formula Ford team started the season in Sinter chassis but due to poor results they switched to Mygale after three rounds.

=== Spec racing cars ===
In 2000, Mygale was contracted to build the cars for the Portuguese Formula Novis. For 2001 Mygale was contracted by BMW to build the cars for the spec Formula BMW. The chassis was used between 2001 and 2012 in various official BMW championships. In total 38 Formula BMW champions were crowned throughout the world.

The Spider THP is a sportscar produced by Mygale in 2007. This open sportscar was built for Peugeot Sport for the THP Spider Cup. Later came a French and a Danish variant of this European series. The car was a sportscar version of the Peugeot 207 powered by a 1,6L Peugeot engine. The Danish championship ran until 2011 and the European series until 2012.

=== Formula 3 ===
Mygale constructed their first Formula 3 car in 2006, the M-06. Its successor the M-07 was used in at the 2007 Masters of Formula 3 by Esteban Guerrieri and Michael Devaney without success. They also entered select races of the Formula 3 Euroseries in 2007 and 2008. More success came in the Italian Formula 3 in 2009. Mexican driver Pablo Sánchez López, fielded by Alan Racing Team, scored four wins and secured the third place in the championship. For the 2010 season more teams switched to the Mygale chassis. But after a disappointing season with no wins for the Mygale chassis most teams returned to the Van Diemen chassis. The height of success for Mygale in Formula 3 was achieved in 2012. Riccardo Agostini driving the only Mygale chassis won the Italian championship winning 5 races. As the European market diminished Mygale began to export cars to Australia. In 2012 a Mygale was driven by Jon Mills and Roman Krumins. The Mygales were found in the rear of the field. The following year more Mygales were entered. A Mygale was entered by Harvest Motorsport with Erebus Academy for Jack Le Brocq in the first two rounds and Andre Heimgartner in round three. Nick Foster drove for Team BRM. Foster achieved two wins and a third place in the 2013 Australian Formula 3 season. Mygale will construct a new chassis for the Formula 3 ranks in 2016.

=== F1600 Championship Series ===
With some modifications Mygale entered the American F1600 Championship Series. The Mygales were fitted with Honda L15A7 engines. Bryan Herta Autosport was appointed as the official importer for Mygale North America and fielded a factory supported team. In their inaugural season, 2012, BHA driver Brandon Newey achieved four wins and a second place in the championship. BHA repeated this achievement in 2013 with Adrian Starrantino. For 2014 BHA was joined by Pro Mazda team Team Pelfrey to run factory supported Mygales. Mygale chassis were also raced in the Canadian Formula Tour 1600 and Toyo Tires F1600 Championship Series.

=== Formula 4 ===
The Mygale M14-F4 was launched in 2014 under FIA Formula 4 rules. It is used in several national championships, including the French F4 Championship, F4 British Championship, China Formula 4 Championship, NACAM Formula 4 Championship, Formula 4 South East Asia Championship, F4 Danish Championship and F4 Argentina Championship. Additionally, the car was used in folded Australian Formula 4 Championship.

The Mygale M21-F4 was introduced in 2021, conforming to the second-generation FIA Formula 4 rules.

=== Consolidation under Ligier ===
On 10 April 2025, Ligier Automotive announced that Mygale would be fully consolidated under their banner after previously obtaining a majority stake in the company in December 2024. As part of this, Mygale was rebranded to Ligier Advanced Technologies, and it was announced that Mygale cars currently in production will be renamed as Ligiers as part of the changes.

The first major project of Ligier Advanced Technologies is the development of a brand new Formula 3 car called the Ligier JS F326 for the technical regulations of the upcoming 2026 Regional Formula 3 Championships worldwide.

== Racing cars ==
| Year | Car | Engine | Formula/Series | Region |
|---|---|---|---|---|
| 1995 | Mygale FR95 | Renault F3R 2L | Formula Renault 2.0 | Europe |
| 1995 | Mygale SJ95 | Ford Zetec 1,8L | Formula Ford | Europe |
| 1996 | Mygale FR96 | Renault F3R 2L | Formula Renault 2.0 | Europe |
| 1996 | Mygale SJ96 | Ford Zetec 1,8L | Formula Ford | Europe |
| 1997 | Mygale FR97 | Renault F3R 2L | Formula Renault 2.0 | Europe |
| 1997 | Mygale SJ97 | Ford Zetec 1,8L | Formula Ford | Europe |
| 1998 | Mygale FR98 | Renault F3R 2L | Formula Renault 2.0 | Europe |
| 1998 | Mygale SJ98 | Ford Zetec 1,8L | Formula Ford | Europe |
| 1999 | Mygale FR99 | Renault F3R 2L | Formula Renault 2.0 | Europe |
| 1999 | Mygale SJ99 | Ford Zetec 1,8L | Formula Ford | Europe |
| 2000 | Mygale Formula Campus | Renault K4M | Formula Renault Campus; Formula Novis | France; Portugal |
| 2000 | Mygale SJ00 | Ford Zetec 1,8L | Formula Ford | Europe |
| 2000 | Mygale F2000 | Ford Zetec 2L | USF2000 | United States |
| 2001 | Mygale FB02 | BMW K1200RS 1,2L | Formula BMW; Formula LO; JK Racing Asia Series | Worldwide; Switzerland; Asia |
| 2001 | Mygale SJ01 | Ford Zetec 1,8L | Formula Ford | Worldwide |
| 2002 | Mygale SJ02 | Ford Zetec 1,8L | Formula Ford | Worldwide |
| 2003 | Mygale SJ03 | Ford Zetec 1,8L | Formula Ford | Worldwide |
| 2004 | Mygale SJ04 | Ford Zetec 1,8L | Formula Ford | Worldwide |
| 2005 | Mygale SJ05 | Ford Zetec 1,8L | Formula Ford | Worldwide |
| 2006 | Mygale M-06 | | Formula 3 | Europe |
| 2006 | Mygale SJ06 | Ford Duratec 1,6L | Formula Ford | Worldwide |
| 2006 | Spider THP | Peugeot THP 1,6L | Peugeot Spider THP Cup; Peugeot Spider Cup Denmark; Peugeot Spider Cup France | Europe; Denmark; France |
| 2007 | Mygale SJ07 | Ford Duratec 1,6L | Formula Ford | Worldwide |
| 2008 | Mygale M-08 | Mercedes HWA 2L | Formula 3 | Europe |
| 2008 | Mygale M-08 | Opel 2L | Formula 3 | Europe |
| 2008 | Mygale SJ08 | Ford Duratec 1,6L | Formula Ford | Worldwide |
| 2009 | Mygale SJ09 | Ford Duratec 1,6L | Formula Ford | Worldwide |
| 2009 | Mygale M-08 | Mercedes HWA 2L; Opel 2L | Formula 3 | Europe |
| 2010 | Mygale SJ10 | Ford Duratec 1,6L | Formula Ford | Worldwide |
| 2010 | Mygale M-10 | Fiat | Formula 3 | Italy |
| 2011 | Mygale M11 | Various 2L | Formula 3 | Worldwide |
| 2011 | Mygale SJ 2011 | Ford Duratec 1,6L | Formula Ford | Worldwide |
| 2012 | Mygale M12-SJ | Ford EcoBoost 1,6L | Formula Ford | (United Kingdom) Great Britain |
| 2012 | Mygale SJ 2012 Honda | Honda L15A7 | F1600 Championship Series | United States |
| 2013 | Mygale M13-SJ | Ford EcoBoost 1,6L | Formula Ford | (United Kingdom) Great Britain |
| 2013 | Lamera Cup | Ford | Lamera Cup | France |
| 2014 | Mygale M14-F4 | Various | FIA Formula 4 (F4 Argentina, Australian F4, British F4, China F4, F4 Danish, French F4, NACAM F4 and F4 SEA) | Worldwide |
| 2018 | Mygale SJ18A | | Formula Ford | |
| 2022 | Mygale M21-F4 | Various | French F4, F4 Chinese | Worldwide |
