= 2013 International GTSprint Series =

Seasons
- ← 2012 none →

The 2013 International GTSprint Series season was the fourth year of the International GTSprint Series. The season began at Monza on 6 April and finished at Vallelunga on 13 October. Thomas Schöffler won the championship, driving an Audi.

== Teams and drivers ==
| Team | Car | No. | Drivers | Class | Rounds |
|---|---|---|---|---|---|
| (Italy) AF Corse | Ferrari 458 | 21 | (Belarus) Alexander Talkanitsa | GTS2 | 1-2 |
| (Italy) AF Corse | Ferrari 458 | 21 | (Belarus) Alexander Talkanitsa Jr. | GTS2 | 1-2 |
| (Italy) AF Corse | Ferrari 458 | 35 | (Italy) Michele Rugolo | GTS3 | 1 |
| (Italy) AF Corse | Ferrari 458 | 35 | (Germany) Claudio Sdanewitsch | GTS3 | 1 |
| (Italy) AF Corse | Ferrari 458 | 35 | (Portugal) Rui Águas | GTS3 | 5 |
| (Italy) AF Corse | Ferrari 458 | 35 | (Portugal) Francisco Guedes | GTS3 | 5 |
| (Italy) AF Corse | Ferrari 458 | 35 | (Hong Kong) Eric Cheung | GTS3 | 7 |
| (Italy) AF Corse | Ferrari 458 | 35 | (Italy) Sandro Montani | GTS3 | 7 |
| (Italy) AF Corse | Ferrari 458 | 36 | (Thailand) Pasin Lathouras | GTS3 | 1-2 |
| (Italy) AF Corse | Ferrari 458 | 36 | (Thailand) Ramindra Tanakorn | GTS3 | 1 |
| (Italy) AF Corse | Ferrari 458 | 36 | (Monaco) Cédric Sbirrazzuoli | GTS3 | 2 |
| (Italy) AF Corse | Maserati GT | 52 | (Belgium) Adrien de Leener | Cup | 2 |
| (Italy) AF Corse | Maserati GT | 52 | (Belgium) Pierre-Marie de Leener | Cup | 2 |
| (Italy) Scuderia Baldini 27 Network | Ferrari 458 | 27 | (Italy) Lorenzo Casè | GTS3 | 8 |
| (Italy) Scuderia Baldini 27 Network | Ferrari 458 | 27 | (Italy) Paolo Ruberti | GTS3 | 8 |
| (Italy) Scuderia Baldini 27 Network | Ferrari F430 | 72 | (Italy) Cesare Balistreri | Cup | 8 |
| (Italy) Scuderia Baldini 27 Network | Ferrari F430 | 72 | (Italy) Lorenzo Spagnoli | Cup | 8 |
| (Italy) Ombra Racing | Ferrari 458 | 30 | (Italy) Mario Cordoni | GTS3 | 1-3, 5-8 |
| (Italy) Ombra Racing | Ferrari 458 | 30 | (Italy) Massimo Mantovani | GTS3 | 1-3, 5-7 |
| (Italy) Ombra Racing | Ferrari 458 | 31 | (Italy) Stefano Costantini | GTS3 | 2-6, 8 |
| (Italy) Ombra Racing | Ferrari 458 | 31 | (Brazil) Fernando Croce | GTS3 | 2 |
| (Italy) Ombra Racing | Ferrari 458 | 31 | (Italy) Matteo Beretta | GTS3 | 6-8 |
| (Italy) RC Motorsport | Corvette Z06 | 32 | (Italy) Roberto Del Castello | GTS3 | 1-8 |
| (Italy) RC Motorsport | Corvette Z06 | 32 | (Italy) Piero Necchi | GTS3 | 1, 3-6 |
| (Italy) RC Motorsport | Corvette Z06 | 32 | (Italy) Roberto Benedetti | GTS3 | 7-8 |
| (Italy) Autorlando Motorsport | Porsche 911 | 33 | (Italy) Glauco Solieri | GTS3 | All |
| (Italy) Autorlando Motorsport | Porsche 997 | 42 | (Italy) Davide di Benedetto | GTS3 | 5 |
| (Italy) Autorlando Motorsport | Porsche 997 | 42 | (Italy) Michele Merendino | GTS3 | 5 |
| (Italy) Easy Race | Ferrari 458 | 34 | (Italy) Mario Cordoni | GTS3 | 4 |
| (Italy) Easy Race | Ferrari 458 | 34 | (Italy) Massimo Mantovani | GTS3 | 4 |
| (Italy) Easy Race | Ferrari 458 | 41 | (Italy) Tommaso Rocca | GTS3 | 2 |
| (Italy) Easy Race | Ferrari 458 | 41 | (Italy) Diego Romanini | GTS3 | 2 |
| (Italy) Easy Race | Ferrari 458 | 41 | (Brazil) Fernando Croce | GTS3 | 7 |
| (Italy) Easy Race | Ferrari 458 | 41 | (Italy) Andrea Dromedari | GTS3 | 7 |
| (Italy) Easy Race | Ferrari 458 | 41 | (Italy) Michele Merendino | GTS3 | 8 |
| (Italy) Easy Race | Ferrari 458 | 41 | (Italy) Piero Necchi | GTS3 | 8 |
| (Italy) MP1 Corse | Ferrari 458 | 34 | (Italy) Dario Cerati | GTS3 | 7-8 |
| (Italy) MP1 Corse | Ferrari 458 | 34 | (Italy) Stefano Garelli | GTS3 | 7-8 |
| Ferrari Motor Ukraine | Ferrari 458 | 37 | (Ukraine) Andrii Kruglyk | GTS3 | 1 |
| Ferrari Motor Ukraine | Ferrari 458 | 37 | (Ukraine) Ruslan Tsyplakov | GTS3 | 1-2, 6 |
| Ferrari Motor Ukraine | Ferrari 458 | 37 | (United Kingdom) Richard Westbrook | GTS3 | 6 |
| Ferrari Motor Ukraine | Ferrari 458 | 37 | (Italy) Raffaele Giammaria | GTS3 | 8 |
| Ferrari Motor Ukraine | Ferrari 458 | 37 | (Ukraine) Sergey Chukanov | GTS3 | 8 |
| Ferrari Motor Ukraine | Ferrari 458 | 38 | (Italy) Raffaele Giammaria | GTS3 | 2, 5-7 |
| Ferrari Motor Ukraine | Ferrari 458 | 38 | (Ukraine) Andrii Kruglyk | GTS3 | 2, 5-8 |
| Ferrari Motor Ukraine | Ferrari 458 | 38 | (Italy) Marco Cioci | GTS3 | 8 |
| (Slovakia) Dino & Co. Racing Team | Ferrari 458 | 39 | (Slovakia) Patrik Tkáč | GTS3 | 1-3, 5 |
| (Slovakia) Dino & Co. Racing Team | Ferrari 458 | 39 | (Slovakia) Andřej Studenič | GTS3 | 2-3, 5 |
| (Slovakia) Dino & Co. Racing Team | Ferrari 458 | 84 | (Czech Republic) Peter Vanco | Cup | 3 |
| (Italy) Antonelli Motorsport | Porsche 997 | 40 | (Italy) Christian Passuti | GTS3 | 8 |
| (Italy) Antonelli Motorsport | Porsche 997 | 40 | (Italy) Angelo Proietti | GTS3 | 8 |
| (Switzerland) Swiss Team | Maserati GT | 43 | (Italy) Andrea Dromedari | GTS3 | 1-3 |
| (Switzerland) Swiss Team | Maserati GT | 43 | (Italy) Massimo Pigoli | GTS3 | 1-3 |
| (Czech Republic) Scuderia Praha | Ferrari 458 | 44 | (Slovakia) Lubomír Jakubík | GTS3 | 1 |
| (Czech Republic) RPD Racing | Ferrari 458 | 44 | (Slovakia) Lubomír Jakubík | GTS3 | 2-3 |
| (Czech Republic) RPD Racing | Ferrari 458 | 44 | (Czech Republic) Michael Vorba | GTS3 | 2-3 |
| (Czech Republic) RPD Racing | Ferrari 458 | 85 | (Slovakia) Josef Jakubík | Cup | 3 |
| (Germany) MTM Motorsport | Audi R8 | 45 | (Germany) Oliver Mayer | GTS3 | 1 |
| (Germany) MTM Motorsport | Audi R8 | 45 | (Germany) Thomas Schöffler | GTS3 | All |
| (Germany) MTM Motorsport | Audi R8 | 45 | (Sweden) Johan Kristoffersson | GTS3 | 2, 7-8 |
| (Germany) MTM Motorsport | Audi R8 | 45 | (Finland) Antti Buri | GTS3 | 3 |
| (Germany) MTM Motorsport | Audi R8 | 45 | (Belgium) Laurens Vanthoor | GTS3 | 4 |
| (Germany) MTM Motorsport | Audi R8 | 45 | (Portugal) Filipe Albuquerque | GTS3 | 5 |
| (Germany) MTM Motorsport | Audi R8 | 45 | (United Kingdom) Oliver Jarvis | GTS3 | 6 |
| (Czech Republic) AR Cars Racing | Ferrari 458 | 46 | (Czech Republic) David Palmi | GTS3 | 2 |
| (Czech Republic) AR Cars Racing | Ferrari 458 | 46 | (Czech Republic) Dennis Waszek | GTS3 | 2 |
| (Netherlands) Kox Racing | Lamborghini Gallardo | 48 | (Netherlands) Peter Kox | GTS3 | 4 |
| (Netherlands) Kox Racing | Lamborghini Gallardo | 48 | (Netherlands) Nico Pronk | GTS3 | 4 |
| (Portugal) Sports&You | Mercedes SLS AMG | 47 | (Portugal) António Coimbra | GTS3 | 5, 7 |
| (Portugal) Sports&You | Mercedes SLS AMG | 47 | (Portugal) Luís Silva | GTS3 | 5, 7 |
| (Portugal) Sports&You | Mercedes SLS AMG | 49 | (Portugal) Miguel Barbosa | GTS3 | 5 |
| (Portugal) Sports&You | Mercedes SLS AMG | 49 | (Portugal) José Pedro Fontes | GTS3 | 5 |
| (Italy) Heaven Motorsport | Porsche 997 | 51 | (Spain) Antonio de la Reina | Cup | 1-2, 4 |
| (Italy) Heaven Motorsport | Porsche 997 | 51 | (Colombia) Steven Goldstein | Cup | 1-2, 4 |
| (Italy) Heaven Motorsport | Porsche 997 | 83 | (Italy) Moreno Petrini | Cup | 7 |
| (Italy) Heaven Motorsport | Porsche 997 | 83 | (Italy) Stefano Sala | Cup | 7 |
| (Italy) M Racing | Porsche 997 | 53 | (Italy) Emanuele Romani | Cup | 8 |
| (Italy) Fortuna Racing | Porsche 997 | 55 | (Italy) Sébastien Fortuna | Cup | 7 |
| (Italy) Petricorse Motorsport | Porsche 997 | 81 | (Italy) Gianluca Carboni | Cup | 1 |
| (Italy) Petricorse Motorsport | Porsche 997 | 81 | (Italy) Marco Cassarà | Cup | 1 |
| (Italy) Petricorse Motorsport | Porsche 997 | 82 | (Sweden) Johan Kristoffersson | Cup | 1 |
| (Slovakia) Machánek Racing | Porsche 997 | 91 | (Slovakia) Miroslav Konôpka | Open | 3 |
| (Slovakia) Machánek Racing | Porsche 997 | 91 | (Slovakia) Rudolf Machánek | Open | 3 |
| (Italy) Scuderia Giudici | Ginetta G50 | 95 | (Italy) Gianni Giudici | Open | 6 |
| (Slovakia) Racing Trevor | BMW Alpina B6 | 96 | (Hungary) Attila Bárta | Open | 2 |
| (Slovakia) Racing Trevor | BMW Alpina B6 | 96 | (Slovakia) Miroslav Konôpka | Open | 2 |
| (Italy) Krypton Motorsport | Porsche 997 | 97 | (Italy) Stefano Pezzucchi | Cup | 7 |
| (Italy) Krypton Motorsport | Porsche 997 | 97 | (Italy) Livio Selva | Cup | 7 |

== Calendar and results ==
| Round | | Circuit | Date | Pole position | Fastest lap | Winning driver | Winning team |
|---|---|---|---|---|---|---|---|
| 1 | R1 | (Italy) Autodromo Nazionale Monza, Monza | 6 April | (Belarus) Alexander Talkanitsa Jr. | (Belarus) Alexander Talkanitsa Jr. | (Belarus) Alexander Talkanitsa | (Italy) AF Corse |
| 1 | R1 | (Italy) Autodromo Nazionale Monza, Monza | 6 April | (Belarus) Alexander Talkanitsa Jr. | (Belarus) Alexander Talkanitsa Jr. | (Belarus) Alexander Talkanitsa Jr. | (Italy) AF Corse |
| 1 | R2 | (Italy) Autodromo Nazionale Monza, Monza | 7 April | (Italy) Michele Rugolo | (Italy) Piero Necchi | (Italy) Roberto Del Castello | (Italy) RC Motorsport |
| 1 | R2 | (Italy) Autodromo Nazionale Monza, Monza | 7 April | (Italy) Michele Rugolo | (Italy) Piero Necchi | (Italy) Piero Necchi | (Italy) RC Motorsport |
| 2 | R1 | (Czech Republic) Masaryk Circuit, Brno | 19 May | (Belarus) Alexander Talkanitsa Jr. | (Belarus) Alexander Talkanitsa Jr. | (Italy) Raffaele Giammaria | Ferrari Motor Ukraine |
| 2 | R1 | (Czech Republic) Masaryk Circuit, Brno | 19 May | (Belarus) Alexander Talkanitsa Jr. | (Belarus) Alexander Talkanitsa Jr. | (Ukraine) Andrii Kruglyk | Ferrari Motor Ukraine |
| 2 | R2 | (Czech Republic) Masaryk Circuit, Brno | 19 May | (Belarus) Alexander Talkanitsa | (Ukraine) Andrii Kruglyk | (Italy) Glauco Solieri | (Italy) Autorlando Motorsport |
| 3 | R1 | Automotodróm Slovakia Ring, Orechová Potôň | 9 June | (Slovakia) Andřej Studenič | (Slovakia) Andřej Studenič | (Finland) Antti Buri | (Germany) MTM Motorsport |
| 3 | R1 | Automotodróm Slovakia Ring, Orechová Potôň | 9 June | (Slovakia) Andřej Studenič | (Slovakia) Andřej Studenič | (Germany) Thomas Schöffler | (Germany) MTM Motorsport |
| 3 | R2 | Automotodróm Slovakia Ring, Orechová Potôň | 9 June | (Italy) Piero Necchi | (Czech Republic) Michael Vorba | (Italy) Glauco Solieri | (Italy) Autorlando Motorsport |
| 4 | R1 | (Belgium) Circuit Zolder, Heusden-Zolder | 22 June | (Germany) Thomas Schöffler | (Netherlands) Peter Kox | (Netherlands) Peter Kox | (Netherlands) Kox Racing |
| 4 | R1 | (Belgium) Circuit Zolder, Heusden-Zolder | 22 June | (Germany) Thomas Schöffler | (Netherlands) Peter Kox | (Netherlands) Nico Pronk | (Netherlands) Kox Racing |
| 4 | R2 | (Belgium) Circuit Zolder, Heusden-Zolder | 23 June | (Netherlands) Peter Kox | (Belgium) Laurens Vanthoor | (Netherlands) Peter Kox | (Netherlands) Kox Racing |
| 4 | R2 | (Belgium) Circuit Zolder, Heusden-Zolder | 23 June | (Netherlands) Peter Kox | (Belgium) Laurens Vanthoor | (Netherlands) Nico Pronk | (Netherlands) Kox Racing |
| 5 | R1 | (Portugal) Autódromo Internacional do Algarve, Portimão | 21 July | (Portugal) José Pedro Fontes | (Portugal) Rui Águas | (Portugal) Rui Águas | (Italy) AF Corse |
| 5 | R1 | (Portugal) Autódromo Internacional do Algarve, Portimão | 21 July | (Portugal) José Pedro Fontes | (Portugal) Rui Águas | (Portugal) Francisco Guedes | (Italy) AF Corse |
| 5 | R2 | (Portugal) Autódromo Internacional do Algarve, Portimão | 21 July | (Portugal) Francisco Guedes | (Portugal) Miguel Barbosa | (Portugal) Miguel Barbosa | (Portugal) Sports&You |
| 5 | R2 | (Portugal) Autódromo Internacional do Algarve, Portimão | 21 July | (Portugal) Francisco Guedes | (Portugal) Miguel Barbosa | (Portugal) José Pedro Fontes | (Portugal) Sports&You |
| 6 | R1 | (United Kingdom) Donington Park, Donington | 1 September | (United Kingdom) Oliver Jarvis | (United Kingdom) Richard Westbrook | (Italy) Raffaele Giammaria | Ferrari Motor Ukraine |
| 6 | R1 | (United Kingdom) Donington Park, Donington | 1 September | (United Kingdom) Oliver Jarvis | (United Kingdom) Richard Westbrook | (Ukraine) Andrii Kruglyk | Ferrari Motor Ukraine |
| 6 | R2 | (United Kingdom) Donington Park, Donington | 1 September | (United Kingdom) Richard Westbrook | (United Kingdom) Richard Westbrook | (Italy) Raffaele Giammaria | Ferrari Motor Ukraine |
| 6 | R2 | (United Kingdom) Donington Park, Donington | 1 September | (United Kingdom) Richard Westbrook | (United Kingdom) Richard Westbrook | (Ukraine) Andrii Kruglyk | Ferrari Motor Ukraine |
| 7 | R1 | (Italy) Autodromo Enzo e Dino Ferrari, Imola | 29 September | (Sweden) Johan Kristoffersson | (Sweden) Johan Kristoffersson | (Sweden) Johan Kristoffersson | (Germany) MTM Motorsport |
| 7 | R1 | (Italy) Autodromo Enzo e Dino Ferrari, Imola | 29 September | (Sweden) Johan Kristoffersson | (Sweden) Johan Kristoffersson | (Germany) Thomas Schöffler | (Germany) MTM Motorsport |
| 7 | R2 | (Italy) Autodromo Enzo e Dino Ferrari, Imola | 29 September | (Ukraine) Andrii Kruglyk | (Sweden) Johan Kristoffersson | (Sweden) Johan Kristoffersson | (Germany) MTM Motorsport |
| 7 | R2 | (Italy) Autodromo Enzo e Dino Ferrari, Imola | 29 September | (Ukraine) Andrii Kruglyk | (Sweden) Johan Kristoffersson | (Germany) Thomas Schöffler | (Germany) MTM Motorsport |
| 8 | R1 | (Italy) ACI Vallelunga Circuit, Campagnano | 13 October | (Italy) Raffaele Giammaria | (Italy) Raffaele Giammaria | (Italy) Lorenzo Casè | (Italy) Scuderia Baldini 27 Network |
| 8 | R1 | (Italy) ACI Vallelunga Circuit, Campagnano | 13 October | (Italy) Raffaele Giammaria | (Italy) Raffaele Giammaria | (Italy) Paolo Ruberti | (Italy) Scuderia Baldini 27 Network |
| 8 | R2 | (Italy) ACI Vallelunga Circuit, Campagnano | 13 October | (Ukraine) Sergey Chukanov | (Italy) Raffaele Giammaria | (Ukraine) Sergey Chukanov | Ferrari Motor Ukraine |
| 8 | R2 | (Italy) ACI Vallelunga Circuit, Campagnano | 13 October | (Ukraine) Sergey Chukanov | (Italy) Raffaele Giammaria | (Italy) Raffaele Giammaria | Ferrari Motor Ukraine |

== Championship Standings ==
=== Drivers' championship ===
| Pos | Driver | MON (Italy) | | BRN (Czech Republic) | | SVK (Slovakia) | | ZOL (Belgium) | | POR (Portugal) | | DON (United Kingdom) | | IMO (Italy) | | VAL (Italy) | | Pts |
|---|---|---|---|---|---|---|---|---|---|---|---|---|---|---|---|---|---|---|
**International GTSprint Series**
| 1 | (Germany) Thomas Schöffler | 7 | 5 | 13 | 7 | 1 | Ret | **2** | 2 | 2 | 2 | **3** | 3 | **1** | 1 | 8 | 9 | 226 |
| 2 | (Italy) Glauco Solieri | 2 | Ret | 7 | 1 | 4 | 1 | 5 | 3 | Ret | 10† | 4 | 4 | 3 | 3 | 7 | 7 | 198 |
| 3 | (Ukraine) Andrii Kruglyk | 3 | 4 | 1 | 3 | | | | | Ret | 7 | 1 | 1 | 2 | **2** | 2 | 4 | 197 |
| 4 | (Italy) Raffaele Giammaria | | | 1 | 3 | | | | | Ret | 7 | 1 | 1 | 2 | **2** | **3** | **1** | 176 |
| 5 | (Italy) Roberto Del Castello | 6 | 1 | 4 | 10 | 3 | **5** | 3 | 4 | 8† | Ret | 6 | 7 | 7 | 8 | DNS | DNS | 136 |
| 6 | (Brazil) Fernando Croce | | | 8 | DSQ | 5 | 4 | Ret | 6 | 3 | 8† | 5 | 5 | 8 | 5 | 6 | 2 | 136 |
| 7 | (Italy) Piero Necchi | 6 | 1 | | | 3 | **5** | 3 | 4 | 8† | Ret | 6 | 7 | | | 9 | 6 | 133 |
| 8 | (Italy) Mario Cordoni | Ret | 6 | 6 | 8 | DNS | DNS | 4 | 5 | 7 | 6 | 7 | 6 | 4 | 4 | 4 | 11† | 132 |
| 9 | (Italy) Massimo Mantovani | Ret | 6 | 6 | 8 | DNS | DNS | 4 | 5 | 7 | 6 | 7 | 6 | 4 | 4 | | | 110 |
| 10 | (Slovakia) Patrik Tkáč | 9 | 8 | 17† | 9 | **2** | 2 | | | 6 | 4 | | | | | | | 79 |
| 11 | (Sweden) Johan Kristoffersson | | | 13 | 7 | | | | | | | | | **1** | 1 | 8 | 9 | 77 |
| 12 | (Ukraine) Ruslan Tsyplakov | 3 | 4 | 12 | 11 | | | | | | | 2 | **2** | | | | | 73 |
| 13 | (Slovakia) Andřej Studenič | | | 17† | 9 | **2** | 2 | | | 6 | 4 | | | | | | | 68 |
| 14 | (Belarus) Alexander Talkanitsa | **1** | Ret | **2** | **2** | | | | | | | | | | | | | 67 |
| 14 | (Belarus) Alexander Talkanitsa Jr. | **1** | Ret | **2** | **2** | | | | | | | | | | | | | 67 |
| 15 | (Slovakia) Lubomír Jakubík | 8 | 7 | 5 | 4 | Ret | 3 | | | | | | | | | | | 56 |
| 16 | (Italy) Matteo Beretta | | | | | | | | | | | 5 | 5 | DNS | DNS | 6 | 2 | 53 |
| 17 | (Italy) Andrea Dromedari | 12† | 3 | 10 | 12 | 6 | DNS | | | | | | | 8 | 5 | | | 53 |
| 18 | (Netherlands) Peter Kox | | | | | | | 1 | **1** | | | | | | | | | 48 |
| 18 | (Netherlands) Nico Pronk | | | | | | | 1 | **1** | | | | | | | | | 48 |
| 19 | (Portugal) António Coimbra | | | | | | | | | 4 | 3 | | | 6 | 6 | | | 48 |
| 19 | (Portugal) Luís Silva | | | | | | | | | 4 | 3 | | | 6 | 6 | | | 48 |
| 20 | (Thailand) Ramindra Tanakorn | 4 | 2 | 9 | 6 | | | | | | | | | | | | | 45 |
| 21 | (Czech Republic) Michael Vorba | | | 5 | 4 | Ret | 3 | | | | | | | | | | | 43 |
| 22 | (Ukraine) Sergey Chukanov | | | | | | | | | | | | | | | **3** | **1** | 45 |
| 23 | (United Kingdom) Richard Westbrook | | | | | | | | | | | 2 | **2** | | | | | 39 |
| 24 | (Belgium) Laurens Vanthoor | | | | | | | **2** | 2 | | | | | | | | | 38 |
| 25 | (Italy) Marco Cioci | | | | | | | | | | | | | | | 2 | 4 | 38 |
| 26 | (Portugal) Rui Águas | | | | | | | | | 1 | **5** | | | | | | | 36 |
| 26 | (Portugal) Francisco Guedes | | | | | | | | | 1 | **5** | | | | | | | 36 |
| 27 | (Portugal) Filipe Albuquerque | | | | | | | | | 2 | 2 | | | | | | | 36 |
| 28 | (Italy) Michele Merendino | | | | | | | | | 5 | 9† | | | | | 9 | 6 | 36 |
| 29 | (Italy) Massimo Pigoli | 12† | 3 | 10 | 12 | 6 | DNS | | | | | | | | | | | 35 |
| 30 | (Thailand) Pasin Lathouras | 4 | 2 | | | | | | | | | | | | | | | 31 |
| 31 | (United Kingdom) Oliver Jarvis | | | | | | | | | | | **3** | 3 | | | | | 31 |
| 32 | (Portugal) Miguel Barbosa | | | | | | | | | **Ret** | 1 | | | | | | | 28 |
| 32 | (Portugal) José Pedro Fontes | | | | | | | | | **Ret** | 1 | | | | | | | 28 |
| 33 | (Finland) Antti Buri | | | | | 1 | Ret | | | | | | | | | | | 26 |
| 34 | (Czech Republic) David Palmi | | | 3 | 5 | | | | | | | | | | | | | 26 |
| 34 | (Czech Republic) Dennis Waszek | | | 3 | 5 | | | | | | | | | | | | | 26 |
| 35 | (Germany) Oliver Mayer | 7 | 5 | | | | | | | | | | | | | | | 18 |
| 36 | (Italy) Davide di Benedetto | | | | | | | | | 5 | 9† | | | | | | | 16 |
| 37 | (Italy) Michele Rugolo | 5 | **Ret** | | | | | | | | | | | | | | | 15 |
| 37 | (Germany) Claudio Sdanewitsch | 5 | **Ret** | | | | | | | | | | | | | | | 15 |
| 38 | (Monaco) Cédric Sbirrazzuoli | | | 9 | 6 | | | | | | | | | | | | | 14 |
| 39 | (Italy) Roberto Benedetti | | | | | | | | | | | | | 7 | 8 | DNS | DNS | 13 |
| 40 | (Italy) Stefano Costantini | | | 8 | DSQ | | | | | | | | | | | | | 7 |
| 41 | (Italy) Tommaso Rocca | | | 11 | 13 | | | | | | | | | | | | | 6 |
| 41 | (Italy) Diego Romanini | | | 11 | 13 | | | | | | | | | | | | | 6 |
Guest drivers ineligible for points
| | (Italy) Lorenzo Casè | | | | | | | | | | | | | | | 1 | 3 | 0 |
| | (Italy) Paolo Ruberti | | | | | | | | | | | | | | | 1 | 3 | 0 |
| | (Italy) Christian Passuti | | | | | | | | | | | | | | | 5 | 5 | 0 |
| | (Italy) Angelo Proietti | | | | | | | | | | | | | | | 5 | 5 | 0 |
| | (Italy) Dario Cerati | | | | | | | | | | | | | 5 | DNS | 10 | 8 | 0 |
| | (Italy) Stefano Garelli | | | | | | | | | | | | | 5 | DNS | 10 | 8 | 0 |
| | (Hong Kong) Eric Cheung | | | | | | | | | | | | | 9 | 7 | | | 0 |
| | (Italy) Sandro Montani | | | | | | | | | | | | | 9 | 7 | | | 0 |
**International GTSCup Trophy**
| 1 | (Spain) Antonio de la Reina | 11 | 9 | 15 | 14 | | | 6 | 7 | | | | | | | | | 133 |
| 1 | (Colombia) Steven Goldstein | 11 | 9 | 15 | 14 | | | 6 | 7 | | | | | | | | | 133 |
| 2 | (Czech Republic) Peter Vanco | | | | | 8 | 6 | | | | | | | | | | | 46 |
| 3 | (Italy) Gianluca Carboni | 10 | 10 | | | | | | | | | | | | | | | 41 |
| 3 | (Italy) Marco Cassarà | 10 | 10 | | | | | | | | | | | | | | | 41 |
| 4 | (Slovakia) Josef Jakubík | | | | | 9 | 7 | | | | | | | | | | | 36 |
| 5 | (Belgium) Adrien de Leener | | | 16 | 15 | | | | | | | | | | | | | 36 |
| 5 | (Belgium) Pierre-Marie de Leener | | | 16 | 15 | | | | | | | | | | | | | 36 |
| 6 | (Sweden) Johan Kristoffersson | Ret | DNS | | | | | | | | | | | | | | | 3 |
Guest drivers ineligible for points
| | (Italy) Sébastien Fortuna | | | | | | | | | | | | | 11 | 9 | | | 0 |
| | (Italy) Stefano Pezzucchi | | | | | | | | | | | | | 10 | 10 | | | 0 |
| | (Italy) Livio Selva | | | | | | | | | | | | | 10 | 10 | | | 0 |
| | (Italy) Cesare Balistreri | | | | | | | | | | | | | | | 11 | 10 | 0 |
| | (Italy) Lorenzo Spagnoli | | | | | | | | | | | | | | | 11 | 10 | 0 |
| | (Italy) Emanuele Romani | | | | | | | | | | | | | | | Ret | Ret | 0 |
| | (Italy) Moreno Petrini | | | | | | | | | | | | | DNS | DNS | | | 0 |
| | (Italy) Stefano Sala | | | | | | | | | | | | | DNS | DNS | | | 0 |
**GTSOpen Trophy**
| 1 | (Slovakia) Miroslav Konôpka | | | 14 | Ret | 7 | 8 | | | | | | | | | | | 72 |
| 2 | (Slovakia) Rudolf Machánek | | | | | 7 | 8 | | | | | | | | | | | 46 |
| 3 | (Hungary) Attila Bárta | | | 14 | Ret | | | | | | | | | | | | | 26 |
| 4 | (Italy) Gianni Giudici | | | | | | | | | | | Ret | Ret | | | | | 5 |
| Pos | Driver | MON (Italy) | | BRN (Czech Republic) | | SVK (Slovakia) | | ZOL (Belgium) | | POR (Portugal) | | DON (United Kingdom) | | IMO (Italy) | | VAL (Italy) | | Pts |

| Colour | Result |
|---|---|
| Gold | Winner |
| Silver | Second place |
| Bronze | Third place |
| Green | Points classification |
| Blue | Non-points classification |
| Blue | Non-classified finish (NC) |
| Purple | Retired, not classified (Ret) |
| Red | Did not qualify (DNQ) |
| Red | Did not pre-qualify (DNPQ) |
| Black | Disqualified (DSQ) |
| White | Did not start (DNS) |
| White | Withdrew (WD) |
| White | Race cancelled (C) |
| Blank | Did not practice (DNP) |
| Blank | Did not arrive (DNA) |
| Blank | Excluded (EX) |

**Bold** – Pole
Italics – Fastest Lap

† - Drivers did not finish the race, but were classified as they completed over 50% of the race distance.
