= 2012 International GTSprint Series =

Seasons
- ← 2011 2013 →

The 2012 International GTSprint Series season was the third year of the International GTSprint Series. The season began at Monza on 1 April and finished at Pergusa on 28 October. Andrea Palma won the championship, driving a Ferrari.

== Teams and drivers ==
| Team | Car | No. | Drivers | Class | Rounds |
|---|---|---|---|---|---|
| (Switzerland) Kessel Racing | Ferrari F430 | 2 | (Italy) Lorenzo Bontempelli | GTS2 | 2 |
| (Switzerland) Kessel Racing | Ferrari 458 | 36 | (Italy) Ivan Capelli | GTS3 | 3 |
| (Switzerland) Kessel Racing | Ferrari F430 | 51 | (Italy) Gianfranco Bocellari | Cup | All |
| (Switzerland) Kessel Racing | Ferrari F430 | 51 | (Italy) Roberto Delli Guanti | Cup | All |
| (Switzerland) Kessel Racing | Ferrari F430 | 52 | (Italy) Roberto Sorti | Cup | 1-2 |
| (Switzerland) Kessel Racing | Ferrari F430 | 52 | (Italy) Moreno Petrini | Cup | 1-2 |
| (Italy) Autorlando Motorsport | Porsche 997 | 12 | (Italy) Glauco Solieri | GTS2 | All |
| (Italy) Black Team | Ferrari F430 | 15 | (Italy) Raffaele Giammaria | GTS2 | 1-2 |
| (Italy) Black Team | Ferrari F430 | 15 | (Italy) Simone Pellegrinelli | GTS2 | 1-5 |
| (Italy) Black Team | Ferrari F430 | 15 | (Italy) Francesca Linossi | GTS2 | 3-6 |
| (Italy) Black Team | Ferrari F430 | 15 | (Italy) Luciano Linossi | GTS2 | 6 |
| (Italy) Black Team | Ferrari F430 | 15 | (Italy) Ciccio La Mazza | GTS2 | 7 |
| (Italy) Black Team | Ferrari F430 | 25 | (Italy) Massimiliano Mugelli | GTS2 | 5 |
| (Italy) Black Team | Ferrari 458 | 27 | (Italy) Andrea Palma | GTS2 | All |
| (Italy) Ombra Racing | Ferrari 458 | 30 | (Italy) Mario Cordoni | GTS3 | 2-7 |
| (Italy) AF Corse | Ferrari 458 | 31 | (France) François Perrodo | GTS3 | 5 |
| (Italy) Antonelli Motorsport | Porsche 997 | 32 | (Italy) Angelo Proietti | GTS3 | 6 |
| (Italy) Antonelli Motorsport | Porsche 997 | 32 | (Italy) Mario La Barbera | GTS3 | 7 |
| (Italy) Antonelli Motorsport | Porsche 997 | 32 | (Italy) Giosuè Rizzuto | GTS3 | 7 |
| (Italy) Antonelli Motorsport | Porsche 997 | 53 | (Colombia) Steven Goldstein | Cup | 3 |
| (Italy) Antonelli Motorsport | Porsche 997 | 53 | (Italy) Christian Passuti | Cup | 3 |
| (Italy) Antonelli Motorsport | Porsche 997 | 54 | (Italy) Alberto Brambati | Cup | 2 |
| (Italy) Antonelli Motorsport | Porsche 997 | 54 | (Italy) Marco Magli | Cup | 2 |
| (Italy) Antonelli Motorsport | Porsche 997 | 54 | (Italy) Alessandro Baccani | Cup | 3 |
| (Italy) Antonelli Motorsport | Porsche 997 | 54 | (Italy) Paolo Venerosi | Cup | 3 |
| (Italy) Antonelli Motorsport | Porsche 997 | 54 | (Italy) Vincenzo Donativi | Cup | 6 |
| (Italy) Antonelli Motorsport | Porsche 997 | 55 | (Italy) Omar Galbiati | Cup | 1-3 |
| (Italy) Antonelli Motorsport | Porsche 997 | 56 | (Italy) Niccolò Granzotto | Cup | 2 |
| (Italy) Antonelli Motorsport | Porsche 997 | 56 | (Italy) Alberto Brambati | Cup | 3 |
| (Italy) Antonelli Motorsport | Porsche 997 | 56 | (Italy) Pietro Negra | Cup | 3 |
| (Italy) Antonelli Motorsport | Porsche 997 | 56 | (Italy) Domenico Guagliardo | Cup | 7 |
| (Italy) Antonelli Motorsport | Porsche 997 | 56 | (Italy) Giuseppe Trinca | Cup | 7 |
| (Italy) RC Motorsport | Corvette Z06 | 34 | (Italy) Roberto Benedetti | GTS3 | All |
| (Italy) RC Motorsport | Corvette Z06 | 34 | (Italy) Roberto Del Castello | GTS3 | All |
| (Italy) Audi Sport Italia | Audi R8 | 35 | (Italy) Davide di Benedetto | GTS3 | 7 |
| (Italy) Audi Sport Italia | Audi R8 | 35 | (Italy) Michele Merendino | GTS3 | 7 |
| (United Arab Emirates) Blue Jumeirah Team | Mosler MT900R | 38 | (Spain) Rafael Unzurrunzaga | GTS3 | 4 |
| (Switzerland) Swiss Team | Maserati GT | 38 | (Switzerland) Gabriele Gardel | GTS3 | 6 |
| (Switzerland) Swiss Team | Maserati GT | 38 | (Italy) Alessandro Pier Guidi | GTS3 | 6 |
| (Italy) GDL Racing | Porsche 997 | 41 | (Colombia) Steven Goldstein | Cup | 4-5 |
| (Italy) GDL Racing | Porsche 997 | 41 | (Italy) Giacomo Piccini | Cup | 4-5 |
| (Italy) GDL Racing | Porsche 997 | 58 | (Italy) Vittorio Bagnasco | Cup | 6-7 |
| (Italy) GDL Racing | Porsche 997 | 91 | (Italy) Ennio Ricci | Open | 2-5 |
| (Italy) GDL Racing | Porsche 997 | 91 | (Italy) Angelo Schiatti | Open | 2-5 |
| (Finland) LMS Racing | Dodge Viper | 42 | (Finland) Antti Buri | Open | 5 |
| (Italy) Malucelli Motorsport | Ferrari F430 | 57 | (San Marino) Marco Galassi | Cup | 1-6 |
| (Italy) Happy Racer | Porsche 997 | 58 | (Italy) Vittorio Bagnasco | Cup | 1-5 |
| (Italy) Happy Racer | Porsche 997 | 90 | (Ukraine) Oleksandr Gaidai | Open | 1 |
| (Italy) Mik Corse | Lamborghini Gallardo | 61 | (Colombia) Steven Goldstein | Cup | 1-2 |
| (Italy) Mik Corse | Lamborghini Gallardo | 61 | (Colombia) Felipe Merjech | Cup | 1-2 |
| (Italy) Scuderia La.Na. | Ferrari F430 | 63 | (Italy) Gianmaria Gabbiani | Cup | 2-3 |
| (Italy) Scuderia La.Na. | Ferrari F430 | 63 | (Italy) Gianluca Nattoni | Cup | 2 |
| (Italy) Scuderia La.Na. | Ferrari F430 | 63 | (Italy) Marco Bassetto | Cup | 3 |
| (Italy) Scuderia La.Na. | Ferrari F430 | 63 | (Italy) Giovanni Cassibba | Cup | 7 |
| (Italy) Scuderia La.Na. | Ferrari F430 | 63 | (Italy) Mauro Trentin | Cup | 7 |
| (Italy) Scuderia La.Na. | Hyundai Genesis | 93 | (Italy) Gianmaria Gabbiani | Open | 7 |
| (Italy) Scuderia La.Na. | Hyundai Genesis | 93 | (Italy) Gianluca Nattoni | Open | 7 |
| (Italy) M Racing | Porsche 997 | 65 | (Italy) Emanuele Romani | Cup | 6-7 |
| (Italy) M Racing | Porsche 997 | 65 | (Colombia) Steven Goldstein | Cup | 7 |
| (Italy) Rallysport | Lamborghini Gallardo | 68 | (Italy) Ferdinando Serafino | Cup | 3 |
| (Italy) Rallysport | Lamborghini Gallardo | 68 | (Colombia) Steven Goldstein | Cup | 6 |
| (Italy) Rallysport | Lamborghini Gallardo | 68 | (Italy) Raffaele Giammaria | Cup | 6 |
| (Italy) Ebimotors | Porsche 997 | 69 | (Italy) Erika Monforte | Cup | 3 |
| (Italy) Ebimotors | Porsche 997 | 69 | (Italy) Simone Monforte | Cup | 3 |
| (Italy) Ebimotors | Porsche 997 | 70 | (Italy) Roberto Silva | Cup | 1-2, 6 |
| (Italy) Ebimotors | Porsche 997 | 70 | (Italy) Gianluigi Piccioli | Cup | 3 |
| (Italy) Scuderia Baldini 27 Network | Ferrari F430 | 72 | (Italy) Alessandro Bernasconi | Cup | 1-4 |
| (Italy) Scuderia Baldini 27 Network | Ferrari F430 | 72 | (Italy) Lorenzo Casè | Cup | 1-3, 6 |
| (Italy) Scuderia Baldini 27 Network | Ferrari F430 | 72 | (Italy) Matteo Malucelli | Cup | 6 |
| (Italy) Scuderia Baldini 27 Network | Ferrari F430 | 82 | (Italy) Massimiliano Bianchi | Cup | 1-3 |
| (Italy) Scuderia Baldini 27 Network | Ferrari F430 | 82 | (Italy) Nello Nataloni | Cup | 1-2 |
| (Italy) Fortuna Racing | Porsche 997 | 81 | (Italy) Sébastien Fortuna | Cup | 1 |
| (Italy) N-Racing | BMW M3 E92 | 92 | (Italy) Piero Necchi | Open | 1-2 |
| (Italy) AR Motorsport | BMW M3 E92 | 94 | (Italy) Andrea Bacci | Open | 2 |
| (Austria) Renauer Motorsport | Ginetta G50 | 97 | (Austria) Florian Renauer | Open | 7 |
| (Italy) Scuderia Giudici | Lotus Evora | 99 | (Italy) Gianni Giudici | Open | 1 |

== Calendar and results ==
The Pergusa round was to be held in Portimão on 16 September, but it was canceled on 30 June.

| Round | | Circuit | Date | Pole position | Fastest lap | Winning driver | Winning team |
|---|---|---|---|---|---|---|---|
| 1 | R1 | (Italy) Autodromo Nazionale Monza, Monza | 1 April | (Italy) Raffaele Giammaria | (Italy) Raffaele Giammaria | (Italy) Raffaele Giammaria | (Italy) Black Team |
| 1 | R2 | (Italy) Autodromo Nazionale Monza, Monza | 1 April | (Italy) Simone Pellegrinelli | (Italy) Glauco Solieri | (Italy) Andrea Palma | (Italy) Black Team |
| 2 | R1 | (Italy) Autodromo Enzo e Dino Ferrari, Imola | 22 April | (Italy) Raffaele Giammaria | (Italy) Andrea Palma | (Italy) Andrea Palma | (Italy) Black Team |
| 2 | R2 | (Italy) Autodromo Enzo e Dino Ferrari, Imola | 22 April | (Italy) Simone Pellegrinelli | (Italy) Andrea Palma | (Italy) Andrea Palma | (Italy) Black Team |
| 3 | R1 | (Italy) Autodromo Internazionale del Mugello, Scarperia | 3 June | (Italy) Andrea Palma | (Italy) Andrea Palma | (Italy) Andrea Palma | (Italy) Black Team |
| 3 | R2 | (Italy) Autodromo Internazionale del Mugello, Scarperia | 3 June | (Italy) Andrea Palma | (Italy) Andrea Palma | (Italy) Andrea Palma | (Italy) Black Team |
| 4 | R1 | (Hungary) Hungaroring, Mogyoród | 1 July | (Italy) Andrea Palma | (Italy) Andrea Palma | (Italy) Andrea Palma | (Italy) Black Team |
| 4 | R2 | (Hungary) Hungaroring, Mogyoród | 1 July | (Italy) Andrea Palma | (Italy) Andrea Palma | (Italy) Andrea Palma | (Italy) Black Team |
| 5 | R1 | (Belgium) Circuit de Spa-Francorchamps, Francorchamps | 15 July | (Italy) Andrea Palma | (Italy) Andrea Palma | (Italy) Andrea Palma | (Italy) Black Team |
| 5 | R2 | (Belgium) Circuit de Spa-Francorchamps, Francorchamps | 15 July | (Italy) Andrea Palma | (Italy) Andrea Palma | (Italy) Mario Cordoni | (Italy) Ombra Racing |
| 6 | R1 | (Italy) ACI Vallelunga Circuit, Campagnano | 7 October | (Italy) Andrea Palma | (Italy) Alessandro Pier Guidi | (Italy) Alessandro Pier Guidi | (Switzerland) Swiss Team |
| 6 | R2 | (Italy) ACI Vallelunga Circuit, Campagnano | 7 October | (Italy) Andrea Palma | (Italy) Andrea Palma | (Italy) Andrea Palma | (Italy) Black Team |
| 7 | R1 | (Italy) Autodromo di Pergusa, Enna | 28 October | (Italy) Roberto Del Castello | (Italy) Davide di Benedetto | (Italy) Davide di Benedetto | (Italy) Audi Sport Italia |
| 7 | R2 | (Italy) Autodromo di Pergusa, Enna | 28 October | (Italy) Roberto Benedetti | (Italy) Roberto Benedetti | (Italy) Roberto Benedetti | (Italy) RC Motorsport |

== Championship Standings ==
=== Drivers' championship ===
| Pos | Driver | MON (Italy) | | IMO (Italy) | | MUG (Italy) | | HUN (Hungary) | | SPA (Belgium) | | VAL (Italy) | | PER (Italy) | | Pts |
|---|---|---|---|---|---|---|---|---|---|---|---|---|---|---|---|---|
**International GTSprint Series**
| 1 | (Italy) Andrea Palma | 2 | 1 | 1 | 1 | **1** | **1** | **1** | **1** | **1** | **3** | **2** | **1** | Ret | DNS | 251 |
| 2 | (Italy) Mario Cordoni | | | 2 | 4 | 6 | 5 | 2 | 2 | 3 | 1 | 5 | 12† | 2 | 8† | 157 |
| 3 | (Italy) Glauco Solieri | 3 | 2 | 4 | 3 | 5 | 4 | 3 | 4 | DNS | DNS | 6 | DNS | 3 | 2 | 134 |
| 4 | (Italy) Roberto Benedetti | Ret | DNS | 5 | Ret | 3 | 3 | 4 | 4 | 4 | 4 | 4 | Ret | **11**† | **1** | 128 |
| 4 | (Italy) Roberto Del Castello | Ret | DNS | 5 | Ret | 3 | 3 | 4 | 4 | 4 | 4 | 4 | Ret | **11**† | **1** | 128 |
| 5 | (Italy) Simone Pellegrinelli | **1** | 3 | **Ret** | **DNS** | 4 | 17† | 6 | 5 | 11 | 8 | | | | | 90 |
| 6 | (Italy) Francesca Linossi | | | | | 4 | 17† | 6 | 5 | 11 | 8 | Ret | 7 | | | 64 |
| 7 | (Italy) Raffaele Giammaria | **1** | 3 | **Ret** | **DNS** | | | | | | | | | | | 38 |
| 8 | (Italy) Davide di Benedetto | | | | | | | | | | | | | 1 | 3 | 35 |
| 8 | (Italy) Michele Merendino | | | | | | | | | | | | | 1 | 3 | 35 |
| 9 | (Italy) Ivan Capelli | | | | | 2 | 2 | | | | | | | | | 32 |
| 10 | (Switzerland) Gabriele Gardel | | | | | | | | | | | 1 | 13† | | | 29 |
| 10 | (Italy) Alessandro Pier Guidi | | | | | | | | | | | 1 | 13† | | | 29 |
| 11 | (Italy) Lorenzo Bontempelli | | | 3 | 2 | | | | | | | | | | | 29 |
| 12 | (Italy) Angelo Proietti | | | | | | | | | | | 4 | 2 | | | 27 |
| 13 | (France) François Perrodo | | | | | | | | | 7 | 6 | | | | | 20 |
| 14 | (Italy) Marco Zanuttini | | | | | | | | | | | 7 | 4 | | | 18 |
| 15 | (Italy) Mario La Barbera | | | | | | | | | | | | | 4 | Ret | 12 |
| 15 | (Italy) Giosuè Rizzuto | | | | | | | | | | | | | 4 | Ret | 12 |
| 16 | (Italy) Massimiliano Mugelli | | | | | | | | | 5 | Ret | | | | | 12 |
| 17 | (Italy) Luciano Linossi | | | | | | | | | | | Ret | 7 | | | 12 |
| 18 | (Italy) Ciccio La Mazza | | | | | | | | | | | | | Ret | 9† | 10 |
| 19 | (Spain) Rafael Unzurrunzaga | | | | | | | 9 | DNS | | | | | | | 7 |
**International GTSCup Trophy**
| 1 | (Colombia) Steven Goldstein | 5 | 8 | 16 | 14 | 8 | 8 | 5 | 7 | 8 | 5 | 8 | 10 | 9 | Ret | 185 |
| 2 | (Italy) Gianfranco Bocellari | 13† | 5 | 13 | 12 | 12 | 11 | 7 | 6 | 7 | 6 | Ret | Ret | 6 | 4 | 182 |
| 2 | (Italy) Roberto Delli Guanti | 13† | 5 | 13 | 12 | 12 | 11 | 7 | 6 | 7 | 6 | Ret | Ret | 6 | 4 | 182 |
| 3 | (Italy) Vittorio Bagnasco | 10 | 10 | 11 | 7 | 10 | 7 | 11 | 8 | 9 | Ret | 12 | 9 | 8 | 7 | 157 |
| 4 | (Italy) Lorenzo Casè | 6 | 15† | 8 | 16 | 7 | Ret | | | | | 9 | 3 | | | 101 |
| 5 | (San Marino) Marco Galassi | 11 | 12 | 17 | 17 | 17† | 12 | 10 | 10† | Ret | Ret | 11 | 6 | | | 80 |
| 6 | (Italy) Giacomo Piccini | | | | | | | 5 | 7 | 8 | 5 | | | | | 74 |
| 7 | (Italy) Roberto Silva | 9 | 7 | 15 | 6 | | | | | | | 14 | 8 | | | 66 |
| 8 | (Italy) Alessandro Bernasconi | 6 | 15† | 8 | 16 | 7 | Ret | Ret | DNS | | | | | | | 65 |
| 9 | (Colombia) Felipe Merjech | 5 | 8 | 16 | 14 | | | | | | | | | | | 42 |
| 10 | (Italy) Matteo Malucelli | | | | | | | | | | | 9 | 3 | | | 37 |
| 11 | (Italy) Domenico Guagliardo | | | | | | | | | | | | | 5 | 5 | 37 |
| 11 | (Italy) Giuseppe Trinca | | | | | | | | | | | | | 5 | 5 | 37 |
| 12 | (Italy) Christian Passuti | | | | | 8 | 8 | | | | | | | | | 32 |
| 13 | (Italy) Omar Galbiati | 7 | 6 | (12) | (11) | (11) | (18†) | | | | | | | | | 29 |
| 14 | (Italy) Niccolò Granzotto | | | 10 | 8 | | | | | | | | | | | 29 |
| 15 | (Italy) Raffaele Giammaria | | | | | | | | | | | 8 | 10 | | | 28 |
| 16 | (Italy) Emanuele Romani | | | | | | | | | | | 10 | 11 | 9 | Ret | 27 |
| 17 | (Italy) Gianmaria Gabbiani | | | 14 | 9 | 19† | 16 | | | | | | | | | 27 |
| 18 | (Italy) Vincenzo Donativi | | | | | | | | | | | 13 | 5 | | | 23 |
| 19 | (Italy) Massimiliano Bianchi | Ret | 13 | 20 | 15 | 16† | 14 | | | | | | | | | 22 |
| 20 | (Italy) Sébastien Fortuna | 8 | 9 | | | | | | | | | | | | | 20 |
| 21 | (Italy) Gianluca Nattoni | | | 14 | 9 | | | | | | | | | | | 20 |
| 22 | (Italy) Moreno Petrini | Ret | 11 | 19 | 13 | | | | | | | | | | | 18 |
| 22 | (Italy) Roberto Sorti | Ret | 11 | 19 | 13 | | | | | | | | | | | 18 |
| 23 | (Italy) Gianluigi Piccioli | | | | | 15 | 13 | | | | | | | | | 16 |
| 24 | (Italy) Giovanni Cassibba | | | | | | | | | | | | | 7 | Ret | 14 |
| 24 | (Italy) Mauro Trentin | | | | | | | | | | | | | 7 | Ret | 14 |
| 25 | (Italy) Erika Monforte | | | | | 14 | 15 | | | | | | | | | 18 |
| 25 | (Italy) Simone Monforte | | | | | 14 | 15 | | | | | | | | | 18 |
| 26 | (Italy) Nello Nataloni | Ret | 13 | 20 | 15 | | | | | | | | | | | 10 |
| 27 | (Italy) Marco Bassetto | | | | | 19† | 16 | | | | | | | | | 7 |
| 28 | (Italy) Ferdinando Serafino | | | | | Ret | 19† | | | | | | | | | 4 |
Guest drivers ineligible for points
| | (Italy) Alberto Brambati | | | 9 | Ret | 9 | 10 | | | | | | | | | 0 |
| | (Italy) Pietro Negra | | | | | 9 | 10 | | | | | | | | | 0 |
| | (Italy) Alessandro Baccani | | | | | 18† | 9 | | | | | | | | | 0 |
| | (Italy) Paolo Venerosi | | | | | 18† | 9 | | | | | | | | | 0 |
| | (Italy) Marco Magli | | | 9 | Ret | | | | | | | | | | | 0 |
**GTSOpen Trophy**
| 1 | (Italy) Ennio Ricci | | | 18 | 10 | 13 | 6 | 8 | 9 | 10 | 9 | | | | | 145 |
| 1 | (Italy) Angelo Schiatti | | | 18 | 10 | 13 | 6 | 8 | 9 | 10 | 9 | | | | | 145 |
| 2 | (Finland) Antti Buri | | | | | | | | | 2 | 2 | | | | | 42 |
| 3 | (Ukraine) Oleksandr Gaidai | 4 | 4 | | | | | | | | | | | | | 42 |
| 4 | (Austria) Florian Renauer | | | | | | | | | | | | | 10 | 6 | 42 |
| 5 | (Italy) Piero Necchi | DNS | DNS | 7 | 6 | | | | | | | | | | | 37 |
| 6 | (Italy) Gianni Giudici | 12 | 14 | | | | | | | | | | | | | 32 |
| 7 | (Italy) Andrea Bacci | | | 6 | Ret | | | | | | | | | | | 22 |
| 8 | (Italy) Gianmaria Gabbiani | | | | | | | | | | | | | Ret | DNS | 1 |
| 8 | (Italy) Gianluca Nattoni | | | | | | | | | | | | | Ret | DNS | 1 |
| Pos | Driver | MON (Italy) | | IMO (Italy) | | MUG (Italy) | | HUN (Hungary) | | SPA (Belgium) | | VAL (Italy) | | PER (Italy) | | Pts |

| Colour | Result |
|---|---|
| Gold | Winner |
| Silver | Second place |
| Bronze | Third place |
| Green | Points classification |
| Blue | Non-points classification |
| Blue | Non-classified finish (NC) |
| Purple | Retired, not classified (Ret) |
| Red | Did not qualify (DNQ) |
| Red | Did not pre-qualify (DNPQ) |
| Black | Disqualified (DSQ) |
| White | Did not start (DNS) |
| White | Withdrew (WD) |
| White | Race cancelled (C) |
| Blank | Did not practice (DNP) |
| Blank | Did not arrive (DNA) |
| Blank | Excluded (EX) |

**Bold** – Pole
Italics – Fastest Lap

† - Drivers did not finish the race, but were classified as they completed over 50% of the race distance.

=== Teams' championship ===
| Pos | Team | Manufacturer | Points |
|---|---|---|---|
| 1 | (Italy) Black Team | Ferrari | 369 |
| 2 | (Italy) Ombra Racing | Ferrari | 157 |
| 3 | (Italy) Autorlando Motorsport | Porsche | 134 |
| 4 | (Italy) RC Motorsport | Corvette | 133 |
| 5 | (Switzerland) Kessel Racing | Ferrari | 79 |
| 6 | (Italy) Antonelli Motorsport | Porsche | 38 |
| 7 | (Italy) Audi Sport Italia | Audi | 35 |
| 8 | (Switzerland) Swiss Team | Maserati | 29 |
| 9 | (Italy) AF Corse | Ferrari | 20 |
| 10 | (United Arab Emirates) Blue Jumeirah Team | Mosler | 7 |

=== GTS2 Class ===
| Pos | Driver | Manufacturer | Points |
|---|---|---|---|
| 1 | (Italy) Andrea Palma | Ferrari | 261 |
| 2 | (Italy) Glauco Solieri | Porsche | 175 |
| 3 | (Italy) Simone Pellegrinelli | Ferrari | 122 |
| 4 | (Italy) Francesca Linossi | Ferrari | 101 |
| 5 | (Italy) Raffaele Giammaria | Ferrari | 38 |
| 6 | (Italy) Lorenzo Bontempelli | Ferrari | 32 |
| 7 | (Italy) Ciccio La Mazza | Ferrari | 17 |
| 8 | (Italy) Luciano Linossi | Ferrari | 17 |
| 9 | (Italy) Massimiliano Mugelli | Ferrari | 17 |

=== GTS3 Class ===
| Pos | Driver | Manufacturer | Points |
|---|---|---|---|
| 1 | (Italy) Mario Cordoni | Ferrari | 192 |
| 2 | (Italy) Roberto Benedetti | Corvette | 143 |
| 2 | (Italy) Roberto Del Castello | Corvette | 143 |
| 3 | (Italy) Ivan Capelli | Ferrari | 42 |
| 4 | (Italy) Davide di Benedetto | Audi | 38 |
| 4 | (Italy) Michele Merendino | Audi | 38 |
| 5 | (Italy) Angelo Proietti | Porsche | 34 |
| 6 | (Switzerland) Gabriele Gardel | Maserati | 33 |
| 6 | (Italy) Alessandro Pier Guidi | Maserati | 33 |
| 7 | (France) François Perrodo | Ferrari | 26 |
| 8 | (Italy) Marco Zanuttini | Ferrari | 25 |
| 9 | (Italy) Mario La Barbera | Ferrari | 14 |
| 9 | (Italy) Giosuè Rizzuto | Ferrari | 14 |
| 10 | (Spain) Rafael Unzurrunzaga | Mosler | 13 |
