= Formula Ford EuroCup =

Former Single-Seater Racing Championship

- Category: Formula racing
- Country: Europe
- Inaugural season: 1969; 2011 (modern)
- Folded: 2012

The Formula Ford EuroCup, or European Formula Ford Championship, refers to two pan-European championships for Formula Ford competitors.

== 1969–2001 ==
The original series was one of the earliest Formula Ford series, first run in 1969 and won by Gerry Birrell driving a Crossle. The series continued to run until 2001 as Formula Ford increasingly became a domestic oriented series with greater emphasis being placed on Formula 3 as a pan-European development Formula. The EFDA Formula Ford 1600 Euroseries was run, between 1979 and 1987 by the European Formula Drivers Association. and run alongside, for winged class, the EFDA Formula Ford 2000 Euroseries .

=== Champions ===
| Season | Champion |
|---|---|
| 1979 | (United Kingdom) John Village |
| 1980 | (Sweden) Bo Martinsson |
| 1981 | (Netherlands) Cor Euser |
| 1982 | (Germany) Volker Weidler |
| 1983 | (Netherlands) Gerrit van Kouwen |
| 1984 | Hans Furrer |
| 1985 | (Brazil) Paulo Carcasci |
| 1986 | (Finland) JJ Lehto |
| 1987 | (Denmark) Svend Hansen |
| 1998 | (United Kingdom) Derek Hayes |
| 1999 | (Australia) Marcos Ambrose |
| 2000 | (United Kingdom) Mark Taylor |
| 2001 | (Sweden) Richard Göransson |

== 2011–2012 ==
The concept was revived in 2011, as a series aimed at giving drivers experience at European race circuits. While individual events nominated a winner, there was no overarching points system or championship. Three national Formula Ford Championships were involved, the British Formula Ford Championship, the Benelux Formula Ford Championship and the Scandinavian Formula Ford Championship. The Formula Ford EuroCup ran for two seasons, and ended after the 2012 season.

=== 2011 season ===
The 2011 Formula Ford EuroCup was the inaugural season of the Formula Ford EuroCup championship. The season began at Brands Hatch on 18 June and ended on 14 August at Circuit Park Zandvoort, after four meetings each consisting of three races.

Each round of the championship consisted of three races, with an overall EuroCup winner for each round announced.

| Round | | Circuit | Date | Supporting | Winning driver | EuroCup winner |
|---|---|---|---|---|---|---|
| 1 | R1 | (United Kingdom) Brands Hatch GP | 18 June | British F3/GT | (United Kingdom) Scott Malvern | (United Kingdom) Scott Malvern |
| 1 | R2 | (United Kingdom) Brands Hatch GP | 18 June | British F3/GT | (United Kingdom) Scott Malvern | (United Kingdom) Scott Malvern |
| 1 | R3 | (United Kingdom) Brands Hatch GP | 19 June | British F3/GT | (United Kingdom) Scott Malvern | (United Kingdom) Scott Malvern |
| 2 | R4 | (Belgium) Circuit de Spa-Francorchamps | 8 July | GT4 European Cup | (United Kingdom) Scott Malvern | (United Kingdom) Scott Malvern |
| 2 | R5 | (Belgium) Circuit de Spa-Francorchamps | 9 July | GT4 European Cup | (Australia) Geoff Uhrhane | (United Kingdom) Scott Malvern |
| 2 | R6 | (Belgium) Circuit de Spa-Francorchamps | 9 July | GT4 European Cup | (United Kingdom) Scott Malvern | (United Kingdom) Scott Malvern |
| 3 | R7 | (Belgium) Circuit Zolder | 16 July | Superleague Formula | (United Kingdom) Scott Malvern | (United Kingdom) Scott Malvern |
| 3 | R8 | (Belgium) Circuit Zolder | 17 July | Superleague Formula | (United Kingdom) Scott Malvern | (United Kingdom) Scott Malvern |
| 4 | R9 | (Netherlands) Circuit Park Zandvoort | 13 August | Masters of Formula 3 | (United Kingdom) Scott Malvern | (United Kingdom) Scott Malvern |
| 4 | R10 | (Netherlands) Circuit Park Zandvoort | 13 August | Masters of Formula 3 | (United Kingdom) Scott Malvern | (United Kingdom) Scott Malvern |
| 4 | R11 | (Netherlands) Circuit Park Zandvoort | 14 August | Masters of Formula 3 | (Netherlands) Joey van Splunteren | (United Kingdom) Scott Malvern |

=== 2012 season ===
The 2012 Formula Ford EuroCup was the second season of the Formula Ford EuroCup. The season began at Brands Hatch on 23 June and ended on 29 July at Nürburgring, after four meetings each consisting of three races. Finnish driver Antti Buri won all three races at the opening meeting at Brands Hatch to take the season's inaugural EuroCup title, before his team boss Nick Tandy – returning to single-seaters – repeated the feat at Spa-Francorchamps. The only driver to claim more than one EuroCup title was Eric Lichtenstein, who claimed each of the last two events at Zandvoort and the Nürburgring.

| Round | | Circuit | Date | Supporting | Winning driver | EuroCup Winner |
|---|---|---|---|---|---|---|
| 1 | R1 | (United Kingdom) Brands Hatch GP | 23 June | British F3 / British GT | (Finland) Antti Buri | (Finland) Antti Buri |
| 1 | R2 | (United Kingdom) Brands Hatch GP | 24 June | British F3 / British GT | (Finland) Antti Buri | (Finland) Antti Buri |
| 1 | R3 | (United Kingdom) Brands Hatch GP | 24 June | British F3 / British GT | (Finland) Antti Buri | (Finland) Antti Buri |
| 2 | R1 | (Belgium) Circuit de Spa-Francorchamps | 6 July | 3000km of Spa | (United Kingdom) Nick Tandy | (United Kingdom) Nick Tandy |
| 2 | R2 | (Belgium) Circuit de Spa-Francorchamps | 7 July | 3000km of Spa | (United Kingdom) Nick Tandy | (United Kingdom) Nick Tandy |
| 2 | R3 | (Belgium) Circuit de Spa-Francorchamps | 7 July | 3000km of Spa | (United Kingdom) Nick Tandy | (United Kingdom) Nick Tandy |
| 3 | R1 | (Netherlands) Circuit Park Zandvoort | 14 July | Masters of Formula 3 | (Netherlands) Bart van Os | (Argentina) Eric Lichtenstein |
| 3 | R2 | (Netherlands) Circuit Park Zandvoort | 14 July | Masters of Formula 3 | (Argentina) Eric Lichtenstein | (Argentina) Eric Lichtenstein |
| 3 | R3 | (Netherlands) Circuit Park Zandvoort | 15 July | Masters of Formula 3 | (United Kingdom) Jake Cook | (Argentina) Eric Lichtenstein |
| 4 | R1 | (Germany) Nürburgring | 28 July | British Formula Ford | (Argentina) Eric Lichtenstein | (Argentina) Eric Lichtenstein |
| 4 | R2 | (Germany) Nürburgring | 29 July | British Formula Ford | (Ecuador) Julio Moreno | (Argentina) Eric Lichtenstein |
| 4 | R3 | (Germany) Nürburgring | 29 July | British Formula Ford | (Argentina) Eric Lichtenstein | (Argentina) Eric Lichtenstein |
