= 2013 GP3 Series =

Season of motor racing competitions

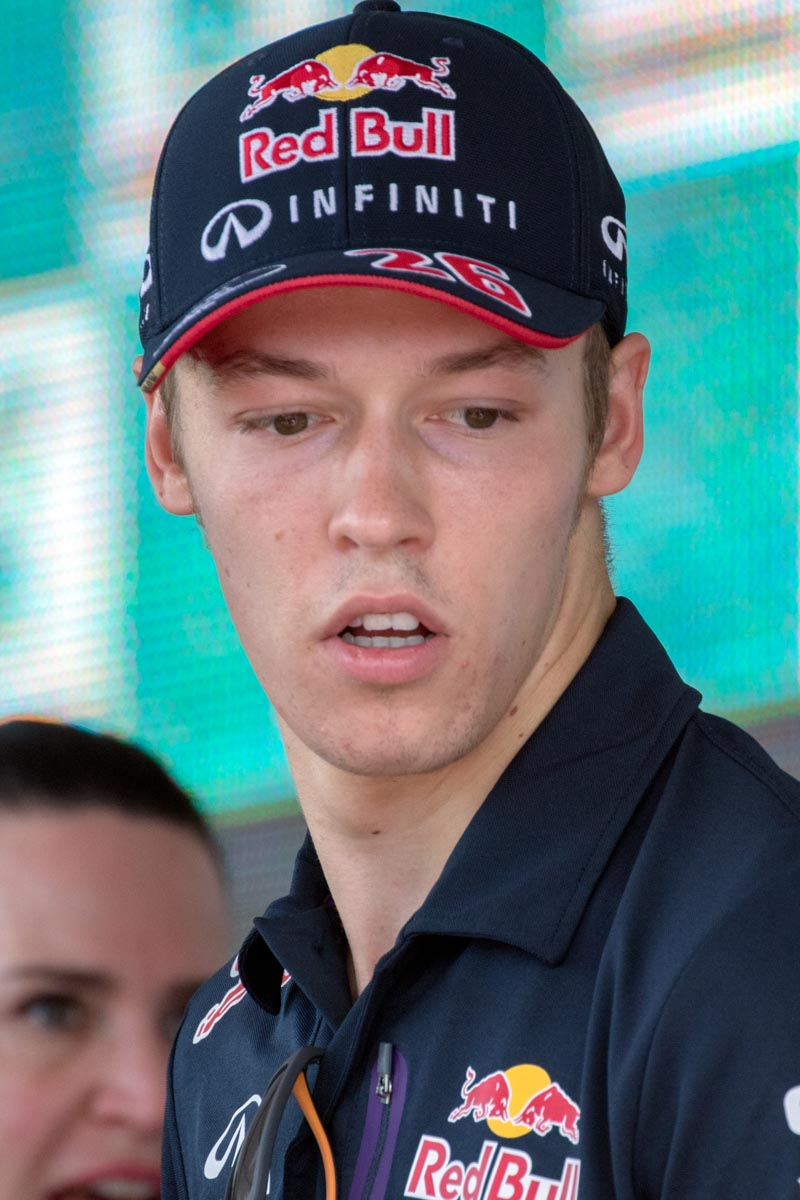
Daniil Kvyat (pictured in 2015), the 2013 champion

The 2013 GP3 Series was the fourth season of the GP3 Series, a motor racing championship that acted as a third-tier feeder series for Formula One and sister series GP2.

The season introduced a new car, the GP3/13, built by Italian racing car manufacturer Dallara. The engine was upgraded to a naturally-aspirated 400bhp V6 unit supplied by AER, and the car also featured a new nose, sidepods and engine cover. The car was estimated to be three seconds per lap than the previous chassis, which was proven correct during pre-season testing.

The championship title was secured by Daniil Kvyat with a race to spare after three consecutive feature race wins in Spa, Monza and Abu Dhabi. He had a thirty-point advantage on ART Grand Prix's Facu Regalia, who finished as runner-up. Regalia's teammate Conor Daly, who was the feature race winner at Valencia, finished in third. Tio Ellinas, who led the drivers' standings until the first race at Spa, bookended the season with victories in both the first race and the final race of the season to finish fourth. Jack Harvey completed the top five, helping ART Grand Prix to claim the teams' championship.

== Teams and drivers ==
The following teams and drivers competed in the 2013 season:

Team	No.	Driver name	Rounds
(France) ART Grand Prix	1	(United States) Conor Daly	All
(France) ART Grand Prix	2	(Argentina) Facu Regalia	All
(France) ART Grand Prix	3	(United Kingdom) Jack Harvey	All
(Australia) MW Arden (Note: Arden International competed under an Australian license.)	4	(Spain) Carlos Sainz Jr.	All
(Australia) MW Arden	5	(Romania) Robert Vișoiu	All
(Australia) MW Arden	6	(Russia) Daniil Kvyat	All
(United Kingdom) Carlin	7	(Macau) Luís Sá Silva (Note: Sá Silva is an Angolan driver who competed under a Macanese licence as Angola was not permitted to grant Grade A licenses.)	All
(United Kingdom) Carlin	8	(United Kingdom) Nick Yelloly	All
(United Kingdom) Carlin	9	(Argentina) Eric Lichtenstein	1–5
(United Kingdom) Carlin	9	(United Kingdom) Alexander Sims	6–8
(Switzerland) Jenzer Motorsport	10	(Venezuela) Samin Gómez	All
(Switzerland) Jenzer Motorsport	11	(Switzerland) Patric Niederhauser	All
(Switzerland) Jenzer Motorsport	12	(Switzerland) Alex Fontana	All
(United Kingdom) Marussia Manor Racing	14	(Cyprus) Tio Ellinas	All
(United Kingdom) Marussia Manor Racing	15	(United Kingdom) Ryan Cullen (Note: Cullen is an Irish driver who competed under a British racing licence.)	All
(United Kingdom) Marussia Manor Racing	16	(United Kingdom) Dino Zamparelli	All
(Canada) Status Grand Prix (Note: Status Grand Prix competed under a Canadian license.)	17	(Sweden) Jimmy Eriksson	All
(Canada) Status Grand Prix	18	(Hong Kong) Adderly Fong	1–3, 5–8
(Canada) Status Grand Prix	18	(United Kingdom) Alexander Sims	4
(Canada) Status Grand Prix	19	(United Kingdom) Josh Webster	All
(United Kingdom) Bamboo Engineering	20	(United Kingdom) Lewis Williamson	1–7
(United Kingdom) Bamboo Engineering	21	(United Kingdom) Melville McKee	1–7
(United Kingdom) Bamboo Engineering	21	(United Kingdom) Alice Powell	8
(United Kingdom) Bamboo Engineering	22	(Spain) Carmen Jordá	All
(Italy) Trident	23	(Italy) Giovanni Venturini	All
(Italy) Trident	24	(Italy) David Fumanelli	1–7
(Italy) Trident	24	(Republic of Ireland) Robert Cregan	8
(Italy) Trident	25	(San Marino) Emanuele Zonzini	All
(Finland) Koiranen GP	26	(Finland) Patrick Kujala	All
(Finland) Koiranen GP	27	(Finland) Aaro Vainio	1–7
(Finland) Koiranen GP	27	(United Kingdom) Dean Stoneman	8
(Finland) Koiranen GP	28	(Estonia) Kevin Korjus	All

=== Team changes ===
The maximum grid size was formally capped at twenty-seven entries, down from the previous limit of thirty.

After racing as Lotus GP in 2011 and 2012, ART Grand Prix reverted to using its original name in 2013.

World Touring Car Championship team Bamboo Engineering replaced Atech CRS Grand Prix.

Ocean Racing Technology withdrew from both the GP3 Series and sister series GP2 after the 2012 season. Their place in the GP3 Series was taken by Formula Renault 2.0 series regulars Koiranen Motorsport, competing under the name Koiranen GP.

=== Driver changes ===
Reigning champions ART Grand Prix saw two drivers leave the team, with Daniel Abt graduating to GP2 with the team and Aaro Vainio moving to new team Koiranen GP. They were replaced by Facu Regalia, who competed in two rounds in 2012 for Jenzer Motorsport and Atech CRS GP, and reigning British Formula 3 champion Jack Harvey.

MW Arden brought a brand new line up, with reigning champion Mitch Evans graduating with the team to GP2, Matias Laine moving to the Formula Renault 3.5 Series, and David Fumanelli moving to Trident Racing. They were replaced by two drivers from the Red Bull Junior Team, Formula Renault 2.0 Alps champion Daniil Kvyat and FIA European Formula 3 Championship driver Carlos Sainz Jr., as well as Robert Vișoiu, who previously raced for Jenzer Motorsport.

Carlin also signed three new drivers, with Alex Brundle moving to the FIA World Endurance Championship, William Buller deciding to focus on the newly formed European Formula Three Championship, and António Félix da Costa moving to the Formula Renault 3.5 Series. They were replaced by Luís Sá Silva, who moved from the now-defunct Formula 3 Euro Series, Nick Yelloly, who had been racing in the Formula Renault 3.5 Series in 2012, and Eric Lichtenstein, who placed third in the 2012 British Formula Ford championship.

Jenzer Motorsport signed Samin Gómez to replace the outgoing Robert Vișoiu. She had previously driven for the team in the 2012 Formula Abarth championship.

Marussia Manor Racing signed two new drivers for 2013, after Dmitry Suranovich switched to the FIA European Formula 3 Championship, and Fabiano Machado left motor racing. They were replaced by Ryan Cullen, who raced in the 2012 British Formula Ford season, and Dino Zamparelli, who moved from the now-defunct Formula Two championship.

Status Grand Prix brought a completely new line up after the departure of all three of their 2012 drivers; Marlon Stöckinger moved to Formula Renault 3.5, Alice Powell joined F3 Cup, and Lewis Williamson switched to series newcomers Bamboo Engineering. They were replaced by three rookies in Jimmy Eriksson, the 2012 German Formula Three champion, Adderly Fong, who placed third in the National Class of the 2012 British Formula 3 Championship, and Josh Webster, who moved from the Formula Renault BARC championship.

Newcomers Bamboo Engineering signed one rookie, Melville McKee, who contested the 2012 Eurocup Formula Renault 2.0, to drive alongside Lewis Williamson and Carmen Jordá, the latter leaving the now-defunct Ocean Racing Technology. Roberto La Rocca had originally been scheduled to drive the car, but was forced to withdraw due to uncertainty over his sponsorship following the death of Venezuelan president Hugo Chávez.

Trident saw two of their 2012 drivers leave the series, as Antonio Spavone concentrated on Auto GP and Vicky Piria switched to the European F3 Open Championship. They were replaced by Sammarinese driver Emanuele Zonzini, who placed fifth in the 2012 Formula Abarth championship, and David Fumanelli.

The second new team, Koiranen GP, signed two rookies to drive alongside Aaro Vainio. They were Formula Renault 2.0 Alps driver Patrick Kujala and Formula Renault 3.5 Series driver Kevin Korjus.

Kevin Ceccon, who had raced for Ocean Racing Technology in 2012, returned to the GP2 Series. From Atech CRS GP, Tamás Pál Kiss moved to Auto GP and Ethan Ringel returned to America to compete in the Indy Lights series.

==== Mid-season changes ====
Alexander Sims replaced Adderly Fong at Status Grand Prix for the round at the Nürburgring as Fong had a clashing race in China. Sims then returned to the series full-time from Spa-Francorchamps, replacing Eric Lichtenstein at Carlin after Lichtenstein was unable to pay for his seat.

Both Robert Cregan and Alice Powell returned to the series for the final round at the Yas Marina Circuit, replacing David Fumanelli and Melville McKee at Trident and Bamboo Engineering respectively. 2010 FIA Formula Two Champion Dean Stoneman also made his return to single seaters in this round, taking Aaro Vainio's seat at Koiranen GP.

== Calendar ==
The official calendar for the 2013 series was unveiled on 19 December 2012. The format remained largely unchanged from 2012, with seven rounds of the championship in support of the 2013 Formula One season and sister series GP2, plus the addition of a stand-alone round at Circuit Ricardo Tormo.

Round		Circuit/Location	Country	Date	Supporting
1	R1	Circuit de Catalunya, Montmeló	Spain	11 May	Spanish Grand Prix
1	R2	Circuit de Catalunya, Montmeló	Spain	12 May	Spanish Grand Prix
2	R1	Circuit Ricardo Tormo, Cheste	Spain	16 June	stand-alone event
2	R2	Circuit Ricardo Tormo, Cheste	Spain	16 June	stand-alone event
3	R1	Silverstone Circuit	United Kingdom	29 June	British Grand Prix
3	R2	Silverstone Circuit	United Kingdom	30 June	British Grand Prix
4	R1	Nürburgring, Nürburg	Germany	6 July	German Grand Prix
4	R2	Nürburgring, Nürburg	Germany	7 July	German Grand Prix
5	R1	Hungaroring, Mogyoród	Hungary	27 July	Hungarian Grand Prix
5	R2	Hungaroring, Mogyoród	Hungary	28 July	Hungarian Grand Prix
6	R1	Circuit de Spa-Francorchamps	Belgium	24 August	Belgian Grand Prix
6	R2	Circuit de Spa-Francorchamps	Belgium	25 August	Belgian Grand Prix
7	R1	Monza Circuit	Italy	7 September	Italian Grand Prix
7	R2	Monza Circuit	Italy	8 September	Italian Grand Prix
8	R1	Yas Marina Circuit, Abu Dhabi	United Arab Emirates	2 November	Abu Dhabi Grand Prix
8	R2	Yas Marina Circuit, Abu Dhabi	United Arab Emirates	3 November	Abu Dhabi Grand Prix

=== Calendar changes ===
- The series did not return to the Circuit de Monaco in 2013.
- The round scheduled to be held at the Valencia Street Circuit was discontinued after the European Grand Prix was removed from the 2013 Formula One season calendar. It was replaced by a stand-alone round at the Circuit Ricardo Tormo, also in Valencia
- The round in Germany moved from the Hockenheimring to the Nürburgring, along with the German Grand Prix
- The 2013 season saw the GP3 Series hold a round outside Europe for the first time, with the final round of the championship scheduled to be held at the Yas Marina Circuit in Abu Dhabi.

== Results ==
Round		Circuit	Pole position	Fastest lap	Winning driver	Winning team	Report
1	R1	(Spain) Circuit de Catalunya	(Cyprus) Tio Ellinas (Note: Kevin Korjus recorded the fastest time in qualifying for the opening race at Barcelona, but started tenth after he and three other drivers received ten-place grid penalties for ignoring yellow flags in the practice session. Tio Ellinas was recognised as the pole-sitter for the race.)	(Cyprus) Tio Ellinas	(Cyprus) Tio Ellinas	(United Kingdom) Marussia Manor Racing	Report
1	R2	(Spain) Circuit de Catalunya		(Estonia) Kevin Korjus	(Finland) Aaro Vainio	(Finland) Koiranen GP	Report
2	R1	(Spain) Circuit Ricardo Tormo	(United States) Conor Daly	(Spain) Carlos Sainz Jr.	(United States) Conor Daly	(France) ART Grand Prix	Report
2	R2	(Spain) Circuit Ricardo Tormo		(United Kingdom) Melville McKee (Note: Melville McKee set the fastest lap, but did not finish in the top 10, so was ineligible to be the point-scorer for the fastest lap. Carlos Sainz Jr. was the point-scorer instead for setting the fastest lap of those finishing in the top 10.)	(Romania) Robert Vișoiu	(Australia) MW Arden	Report
3	R1	(United Kingdom) Silverstone Circuit	(Estonia) Kevin Korjus	(United Kingdom) Jack Harvey	(United Kingdom) Jack Harvey	(France) ART Grand Prix	Report
3	R2	(United Kingdom) Silverstone Circuit		(Russia) Daniil Kvyat	(Italy) Giovanni Venturini	(Italy) Trident	Report
4	R1	(Germany) Nürburgring	(Argentina) Facu Regalia	(Argentina) Facu Regalia	(Argentina) Facu Regalia	(France) ART Grand Prix	Report
4	R2	(Germany) Nürburgring		(United Kingdom) Melville McKee	(United Kingdom) Melville McKee	(United Kingdom) Bamboo Engineering	Report
5	R1	(Hungary) Hungaroring	(Finland) Aaro Vainio	(Finland) Aaro Vainio	(Finland) Aaro Vainio	(Finland) Koiranen GP	Report
5	R2	(Hungary) Hungaroring		(Argentina) Facu Regalia	(Romania) Robert Vișoiu	(Australia) MW Arden	Report
6	R1	(Belgium) Circuit de Spa-Francorchamps	(Spain) Carlos Sainz Jr.	(Russia) Daniil Kvyat	(Russia) Daniil Kvyat	(Australia) MW Arden	Report
6	R2	(Belgium) Circuit de Spa-Francorchamps		(United Kingdom) Alexander Sims	(United Kingdom) Alexander Sims	(United Kingdom) Carlin	Report
7	R1	(Italy) Monza Circuit	(Russia) Daniil Kvyat	(Russia) Daniil Kvyat	(Russia) Daniil Kvyat	(Australia) MW Arden	Report
7	R2	(Italy) Monza Circuit		(United States) Conor Daly	(United Kingdom) Jack Harvey	(France) ART Grand Prix	Report
8	R1	(United Arab Emirates) Yas Marina Circuit	(Russia) Daniil Kvyat	(Russia) Daniil Kvyat	(Russia) Daniil Kvyat	(Australia) MW Arden	Report
8	R2	(United Arab Emirates) Yas Marina Circuit		(United Kingdom) Nick Yelloly	(Cyprus) Tio Ellinas	(United Kingdom) Marussia Manor Racing	Report

== Championship standings ==
Scoring system

Points were awarded to the top 10 classified finishers in the race 1, and to the top 8 classified finishers in the race 2. The pole-sitter in the race 1 also received four points, and two points were given to the driver who set the fastest lap inside the top ten in both the race 1 and race 2. No extra points were awarded to the pole-sitter in the race 2.

Race 1 points

Position	**1st**	**2nd**	**3rd**	**4th**	**5th**	**6th**	**7th**	**8th**	**9th**	**10th**	**Pole**	**FL**
Points	25	18	15	12	10	8	6	4	2	1	4	2

Race 2 points

Points were awarded to the top 8 classified finishers.

Position	**1st**	**2nd**	**3rd**	**4th**	**5th**	**6th**	**7th**	**8th**	**FL**
Points	15	12	10	8	6	4	2	1	2

=== Drivers' championship ===
Pos.	Driver	CAT (Spain)		VAL (Spain)		SIL (United Kingdom)		NÜR (Germany)		HUN (Hungary)		SPA (Belgium)		MNZ (Italy)		YMC (United Arab Emirates)		Points
Pos.	Driver	R1	R2	R1	R2	R1	R2	R1	R2	R1	R2	R1	R2	R1	R2	R1	R2	Points
1	(Russia) Daniil Kvyat	20	Ret	4	5	4	4	Ret	16	3	7	1	6	**1**	2	**1**	5	168
2	(Argentina) Facu Regalia	24†	14	2	7	3	5	**1**	Ret	6	4	3	3	3	4	15	16	138
3	(United States) Conor Daly	3	5	**1**	8	22	Ret	10	9	2	8	2	2	Ret	8	4	3	126
4	(Cyprus) Tio Ellinas	**1**	4	6	4	5	6	2	6	11	10	8	Ret	Ret	11	7	1	116
5	(United Kingdom) Jack Harvey	6	6	10	12	1	7	3	10	4	5	Ret	Ret	7	1	5	4	114
6	(United Kingdom) Nick Yelloly	4	Ret	12	9	6	2	5	3	15	13	6	4	2	Ret	3	6	107
7	(Estonia) Kevin Korjus	8	2	3	6	**2**	9	20†	15	7	3	4	5	6	5	12	12	107
8	(United Kingdom) Alexander Sims							8	2			5	1	5	6	2	7	77
9	(Finland) Aaro Vainio	5	1	7	2	11	8	14	11	**1**	9	20	22†	16	13			75
10	(Spain) Carlos Sainz Jr.	15	DSQ	5	3	13	13	6	5	5	2	**Ret**	13	9	9	DSQ	18	66
11	(Romania) Robert Vișoiu	9	19	8	1	12	Ret	11	23	8	1	9	8	Ret	10	10	11	44
12	(United Kingdom) Lewis Williamson	11	7	19	17	25†	14	4	4	24	Ret	14	10	4	3			44
13	(Switzerland) Patric Niederhauser	2	3	13	Ret	15	11	12	8	25	15	Ret	9	8	Ret	Ret	15	33
14	(United Kingdom) Melville McKee	14	Ret	11	Ret	24	15	7	1	17	Ret	7	Ret	12	7			31
15	(Italy) Giovanni Venturini	12	8	15	13	8	1	16	14	9	6	11	11	11	Ret	11	9	26
16	(United Kingdom) Dean Stoneman															6	2	20
17	(Switzerland) Alex Fontana	10	9	14	11	7	3	Ret	17	10	19	21	12	Ret	Ret	13	10	18
18	(United Kingdom) Dino Zamparelli	Ret	15	9	10	10	Ret	9	7	12	20	10	7	Ret	EX	9	8	13
19	(Italy) David Fumanelli	7	17	Ret	Ret	Ret	20	17	20	16	18	15	14	15	18			6
20	(Finland) Patrick Kujala	Ret	16	21	15	Ret	EX	13	13	14	11	13	20	10	12	8	19	5
21	(Hong Kong) Adderly Fong	23	11	Ret	Ret	9	Ret			20	17	Ret	16	19	20†	17	21	2
22	(Argentina) Eric Lichtenstein	18	10	Ret	Ret	14	10	Ret	21	18	16							0
23	(Macau) Luís Sá Silva	13	12	Ret	22	17	12	Ret	22	Ret	22	12	21†	Ret	19	18	17	0
24	(Sweden) Jimmy Eriksson	19	Ret	18	16	18	21†	Ret	18	13	12	17	15	13	Ret	23	26	0
25	(San Marino) Emanuele Zonzini	17	Ret	16	14	19	Ret	15	12	Ret	Ret	Ret	23	14	14	14	14	0
26	(Venezuela) Samin Gómez	16	13	Ret	19	20	18	18	19	19	14	16	Ret	17	15	22	25	0
27	(Republic of Ireland) Robert Cregan															16	13	0
28	(United Kingdom) Josh Webster	Ret	Ret	17	18	16	16	Ret	Ret	21	DSQ	Ret	18	Ret	16	21	22	0
29	(United Kingdom) Ryan Cullen	21	Ret	20	20	21	17	19	25	23	Ret	18	17	20	Ret	20	24	0
30	(Spain) Carmen Jordá	22	18	Ret	21	23	19	DSQ	24	22	21	19	19	18	17	Ret	23	0
31	(United Kingdom) Alice Powell															19	20	0
Pos.	Driver	R1	R2	R1	R2	R1	R2	R1	R2	R1	R2	R1	R2	R1	R2	R1	R2	Points
Pos.	Driver	CAT (Spain)		VAL (Spain)		SIL (United Kingdom)		NÜR (Germany)		HUN (Hungary)		SPA (Belgium)		MNZ (Italy)		YMC (United Arab Emirates)		Points

Key
Colour	Result
Gold	Winner
Silver	2nd place
Bronze	3rd place
Green	Other points position
Blue	Other classified position
Blue	Not classified, finished (NC)
Purple	Not classified, retired (Ret)
Red	Did not qualify (DNQ)
Red	Did not pre-qualify (DNPQ)
Black	Disqualified (DSQ)
White	Did not start (DNS)
White	Race cancelled (C)
Blank	Did not practice (DNP)
Blank	Excluded (EX)
Blank	Did not arrive (DNA)
Blank	Withdrawn (WD)
Text formatting	Meaning
**Bold**	Pole position point(s)
Italics	Fastest lap point(s)

Notes:

- † — Drivers did not finish the race, but were classified as they completed over 90% of the race distance.

=== Teams' championship ===
Pos.	Team	No.	CAT (Spain)		VAL (Spain)		SIL (United Kingdom)		NÜR (Germany)		HUN (Hungary)		SPA (Belgium)		MNZ (Italy)		YMC (United Arab Emirates)		Points
Pos.	Team	No.	R1	R2	R1	R2	R1	R2	R1	R2	R1	R2	R1	R2	R1	R2	R1	R2	Points
1	(France) ART Grand Prix	1	3	5	**1**	8	22	Ret	10	9	2	8	2	2	Ret	8	4	3	378
1	(France) ART Grand Prix	2	24†	14	2	7	3	5	**1**	Ret	6	4	3	3	3	4	15	16	378
1	(France) ART Grand Prix	3	6	6	10	12	1	7	3	10	4	5	Ret	Ret	7	1	5	4	378
2	(Australia) MW Arden	4	15	DSQ	5	3	13	13	6	5	5	2	**Ret**	13	9	9	DSQ	18	278
2	(Australia) MW Arden	5	9	19	8	1	12	Ret	11	23	8	1	9	8	Ret	10	10	11	278
2	(Australia) MW Arden	6	20	Ret	4	5	4	4	Ret	16	3	7	1	6	**1**	2	**1**	5	278
3	(Finland) Koiranen GP	26	Ret	16	21	15	Ret	EX	13	13	14	11	13	20	10	12	8	19	207
3	(Finland) Koiranen GP	27	5	1	7	2	11	8	14	11	**1**	9	20	22†	16	13	6	2	207
3	(Finland) Koiranen GP	28	8	2	3	6	**2**	9	20†	15	7	3	4	5	6	5	12	12	207
4	(United Kingdom) Carlin	7	13	12	Ret	22	17	12	Ret	22	Ret	22	12	21†	Ret	19	18	17	168
4	(United Kingdom) Carlin	8	4	Ret	12	9	6	2	5	3	15	13	6	4	2	Ret	3	6	168
4	(United Kingdom) Carlin	9	18	10	Ret	Ret	14	10	Ret	21	18	16	5	1	5	6	2	7	168
5	(United Kingdom) Marussia Manor Racing	14	**1**	4	6	4	5	6	2	6	11	10	8	Ret	Ret	11	7	1	129
5	(United Kingdom) Marussia Manor Racing	15	21	Ret	20	20	21	17	19	25	23	Ret	18	17	20	Ret	20	24	129
5	(United Kingdom) Marussia Manor Racing	16	Ret	15	9	10	10	Ret	9	7	12	20	10	7	Ret	EX	9	8	129
6	(United Kingdom) Bamboo Engineering	20	11	7	19	17	25†	14	4	4	24	Ret	14	10	4	3			75
6	(United Kingdom) Bamboo Engineering	21	14	Ret	11	Ret	24	15	7	1	17	Ret	7	Ret	12	7	19	20	75
6	(United Kingdom) Bamboo Engineering	22	22	18	Ret	21	23	19	DSQ	24	22	21	19	19	18	17	Ret	23	75
7	(Switzerland) Jenzer Motorsport	10	16	13	Ret	19	20	18	18	19	19	14	16	Ret	17	15	22	25	51
7	(Switzerland) Jenzer Motorsport	11	2	3	13	Ret	15	11	12	8	25	15	Ret	9	8	Ret	Ret	15	51
7	(Switzerland) Jenzer Motorsport	12	10	9	14	11	7	3	Ret	17	10	19	21	12	Ret	Ret	13	10	51
8	(Italy) Trident	23	12	8	15	13	8	1	16	14	9	6	11	11	11	Ret	11	9	32
8	(Italy) Trident	24	7	17	Ret	Ret	Ret	20	17	20	16	18	15	14	15	18	16	13	32
8	(Italy) Trident	25	17	Ret	16	14	19	Ret	15	12	Ret	Ret	Ret	23	14	14	14	14	32
9	(Canada) Status Grand Prix	17	19	Ret	18	16	18	21†	Ret	18	13	12	17	15	13	Ret	23	26	18
9	(Canada) Status Grand Prix	18	23	11	Ret	Ret	9	Ret	8	2	20	17	Ret	16	19	20†	17	21	18
9	(Canada) Status Grand Prix	19	Ret	Ret	17	18	16	16	Ret	Ret	21	DSQ	Ret	18	Ret	16	21	22	18
Pos.	Team	No.	R1	R2	R1	R2	R1	R2	R1	R2	R1	R2	R1	R2	R1	R2	R1	R2	Points
Pos.	Team	No.	CAT (Spain)		VAL (Spain)		SIL (United Kingdom)		NÜR (Germany)		HUN (Hungary)		SPA (Belgium)		MNZ (Italy)		YMC (United Arab Emirates)		Points

Key
Colour	Result
Gold	Winner
Silver	2nd place
Bronze	3rd place
Green	Other points position
Blue	Other classified position
Blue	Not classified, finished (NC)
Purple	Not classified, retired (Ret)
Red	Did not qualify (DNQ)
Red	Did not pre-qualify (DNPQ)
Black	Disqualified (DSQ)
White	Did not start (DNS)
White	Race cancelled (C)
Blank	Did not practice (DNP)
Blank	Excluded (EX)
Blank	Did not arrive (DNA)
Blank	Withdrawn (WD)
Text formatting	Meaning
**Bold**	Pole position point(s)
Italics	Fastest lap point(s)

Notes:

- † — Drivers did not finish the race, but were classified as they completed over 90% of the race distance.
