= International Series =

International Series may refer to:

- NFL International Series, a series of American football games held outside the United States during the NFL regular season
- ATP International Series, a series of professional tennis tournaments held 2000–2008
- International Series (golf), a series of professional golf tournaments on the Asian Tour

== See also ==
- International GTSprint Series, a grand tourer-style sports car racing held 2010–2014
- International Open Series, a series of snooker tournaments held 2001–2010
- International Rules Series, a senior men's international rules football competition between Australia and Ireland
- International Sedan Series, a stock car racing series created by NASCAR
- International Superstars Series, touring car racing championship held 2004–2013
