= Antti Buri =

Finnish racing driver

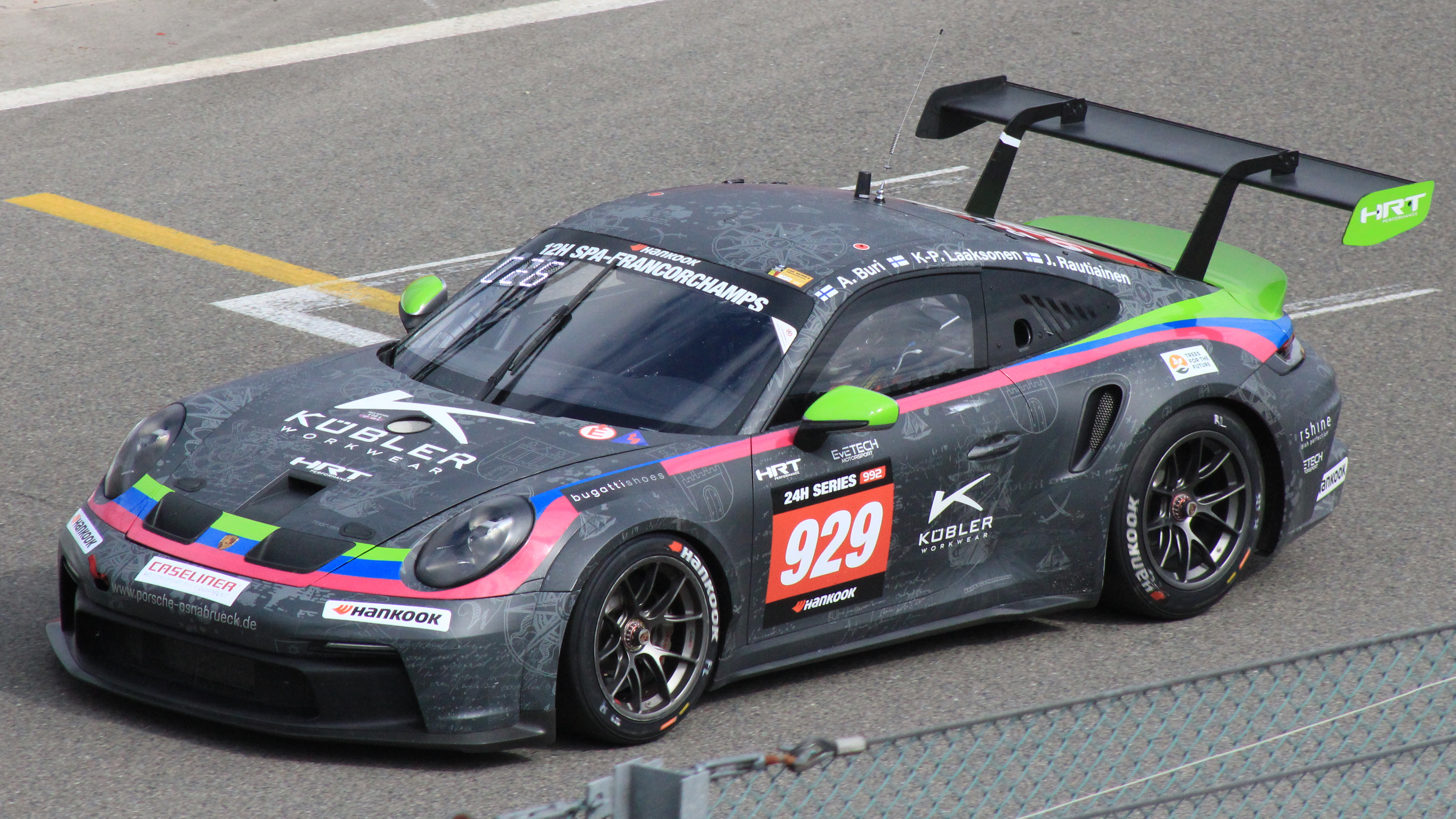
- Nationality: Finnish
- Born: Antti Ilmari Buri; 2 December 1988 (age 37) Turku, Finland

TCR Italian Series career
- Debut season: 2021
- Current team: Target Competition
- Categorisation: FIA Silver
- Car number: 13
- Former teams: Leopard Racing
- Starts: 12
- Wins: 2
- Poles: 1
- Fastest laps: 2
- Best finish: 1st in 2021

Previous series
- 2016 2015 2014 2012-13 2013-14 2013, 15 2013 2012 2011 2010-11 2009-12 2008-12 2007, 09, 12 2007-09: ADAC TCR Germany; Blancpain Endurance Series; Porsche Supercup; International GTSprint Series; Porsche Carrera Cup Germany; Porsche GT3 Cup Finland; Portuguese GT Championship; ADAC Formel Masters; Benelux Formula Ford; Finnish Formula Ford Junior; British Formula Ford; Formula Ford Festival; Formula Ford NEZ; Finnish Formula Ford Zetec

Championship titles
- 2013 2012 2010-11 2007, 09, 12: Porsche GT3 Cup Finland; British Formula Ford; Finnish Formula Ford Junior; Formula Ford NEZ; TCR Italy Touring Car Championship

Antti Ilmari Buri (born 2 December 1988) is a Finnish racing driver currently TCR Italian Series champion, having previously competed in the ADAC TCR Germany Blancpain Endurance Series, Porsche Carrera Cup Germany and International GTSprint Series amongst others.

== Racing career ==
Buri began his career in 2007 in Finnish Formula Ford Zetec, he raced there for many seasons up until 2009, also racing in the Formula Ford NEZ at the time. In 2009 he switched to the British Formula Ford Championship, he raced there up until 2012 and won the championship title that year. He switched to the Finnish Formula Ford Junior for 2010, taking the championship title in both 2010 and 2011. He made a couple of one-off appearances in the Benelux Formula Ford, ADAC Formel Masters & Portuguese GT Championship from 2011-13. For 2013 he switched to the Finnish Porsche GT3 Cup, ultimately winning the championship that year. In 2013, he made a one-off appearance in the Porsche Carrera Cup Germany series, ahead off a full entry in 2014, he finished 27th in the standings that year. From 2013-15, he made one-off appearances in the International GTSprint Series, Porsche Supercup and Blancpain Endurance Series. In 2016, he raced in the ADAC TCR Germany Touring Car Championship, he took his first win in race 2 at the second round held at Sachsenring.

In May 2016, it was announced that Buri would race in the TCR International Series, driving a Volkswagen Golf GTI TCR for Leopard Racing.

== Racing record ==
=== Complete TCR International Series results ===
(key) (Races in bold indicate pole position) (Races in italics indicate fastest lap)

Year	Team	Car	1	2	3	4	5	6	7	8	9	10	11	12	13	14	15	16	17	18	19	20	21	22	DC	Points
2016	Leopard Racing	Volkswagen Golf GTI TCR	BHR; 1	BHR; 2	POR; 1	POR; 2	BEL; 1; 10	**BEL**; **2**; 3	ITA; 1	ITA; 2	AUT; 1	AUT; 2													15th	30
2016	LMS Racing	SEAT León Cup Racer											GER; 1; 5	GER; 2 Ret	RUS; 1	RUS; 2	THA; 1	THA; 2	SIN; 1	SIN; 2	MYS; 1	MYS; 2	MAC; 1; 23†	MAC; 2 Ret	15th	30

^{†} Driver did not finish the race, but was classified as he completed over 75% of the race distance.

=== Complete 24 Hours of Nürburgring results ===
Year	Team	Co-Drivers	Car	Class	Laps	Pos.	Class Pos.
2018	Bas Koeten Racing	(Finland) Olli Kangas (Finland) Kari-Pekka Laaksonen (Spain) Jordi Gene	CUPRA León TCR	TCR	121	32nd	1st

=== TCR Spa 500 results ===
Year	Team	Co-Drivers	Car	Class	Laps	Pos.	Class Pos.
2019	(Switzerland) TOPCAR Sport with Bas Koeten Racing	(Spain) Mikel Azcona (Switzerland) Julien Apotheloz (Switzerland) Fabian Danz (Finland) Kari-Pekka Laaksonen	CUPRA León TCR	**P**	444	**3rd**	**3rd**
