= Eric Lichtenstein =

Argentine racing driver

- Born: 6 October 1994 (age 32) Buenos Aires, Argentina

GP3 Series career
- Debut season: 2013
- Current team: Carlin
- Car number: 7

Previous series
- 2012 2011: British Formula Ford; Formula Pilota China

Eric Lichtenstein (born 6 October 1994) is an Argentine former racing driver.

== Career ==
=== Karting ===
Born in Buenos Aires, Lichtenstein began his karting career at ten. He raced primarily in his native Argentina up to 2011, becoming a champion in various regional karting championships.

=== Early career ===
In 2011, Lichtenstein graduated to single-seaters, racing in the Fórmula Metropolitana series. He also competed in the newly created Formula Pilota China championship.

=== Formula Ford ===
For the next year, Lichtenstein moved to Europe to compete in the British Formula Ford Championship with Jamun Racing, with the support of Velociudad Driver Management, who signed him as their first driver for their program designed to support young Argentine talents. He dominated the second half of the season, winning eleven races total and ultimately finishing third overall in the championship.

=== GP3 Series ===
Lichtenstein stepped up to the GP3 Series with Carlin in 2013. After the race at the Hungaroring, the team terminated his contract with Carlin due to Velociudad Driver Management's non-payment of outstanding driver fees. At the end of the season, he was 22nd in the standings with a best finish of tenth.

== Personal ==
Lichtenstein is Jewish

== Racing record ==
=== Career summary ===
Season	Series	Team	Races	Wins	Poles	F/Laps	Podiums	Points	Position
2010–11	Top Race Series	Crespi Competición Alpine	6	0	0	0	1	33	11th
2011	Formula Pilota China	Asia Racing Team	6	0	0	0	0	10	17th
2011	Fórmula Metropolitana	Scuderia Ramini	2	0	0	0	0	9	22nd
2012	British Formula Ford	Jamun Racing	23	11	11	7	15	484	**3rd**
2012	Formula Ford EuroCup	Jamun Racing	12	3	5	4	11	N/A	N/A
2013	GP3 Series	Carlin	10	0	0	0	0	0	22nd

=== Complete GP3 Series results ===
(key) (Races in bold indicate pole position) (Races in italics indicate fastest lap)

Year	Entrant	1	2	3	4	5	6	7	8	9	10	11	12	13	14	15	16	D.C.	Points
2013	Carlin	CAT; FEA; 18	CAT; SPR; 10	VAL; FEA; Ret	VAL; SPR; Ret	SIL; FEA; 14	SIL; SPR; 10	NÜR; FEA; Ret	NÜR; SPR; 21	HUN; FEA; 18	HUN; SPR; 16	SPA; FEA	SPA; SPR	MNZ; FEA	MNZ; SPR	YMC; FEA	YMC; SPR	22nd	0
