= 2012 British Formula Ford Championship =

Seasons
- ← 2011 2013 →

The 2012 British Formula Ford Championship was the 37th edition of the British Formula Ford Championship. It commenced on 7 April at Oulton Park and ended on 30 September at Donington Park after 8 rounds and 24 races, held in the United Kingdom and Germany.

== Drivers and teams ==
2012 Entry List
Team	No.	Driver	Class	Chassis	Rounds
(United Kingdom) Jamun Racing	2	(United Kingdom) Jake Cook	E	Mygale M12-SJ	All
(United Kingdom) Jamun Racing	3	(United Kingdom) Luke Williams	E	Mygale M12-SJ	1–4, 6–8
(United Kingdom) Jamun Racing	4	(Argentina) Eric Lichtenstein	E	Mygale M12-SJ	All
(United Kingdom) Fluid Motorsport Development	5	(United Kingdom) Alex Drabble	D R	Van Diemen LA11	All
(United Kingdom) Fluid Motorsport Development	6	(United Kingdom) Matt Rao	D	Van Diemen LA09	All
(United Kingdom) Fluid Motorsport Development	55	(United Kingdom) Gavin Halls	G	Van Diemen LA09	4
(United Kingdom) Cullen Motorsport in assn with RCC	7	(United Kingdom) Ryan Cullen	E R	Mygale M12-SJ	All
(United Kingdom) JTR	9	(United Kingdom) Cavan Corcoran	E	Mygale M12-SJ	1–6, 8
(United Kingdom) JTR	10	(Finland) Antti Buri	E	Mygale M12-SJ	All
(United Kingdom) JTR	11	(Ecuador) Julio Moreno	E R	Mygale M12-SJ	All
(United Kingdom) Rendez-Vous Racing	12	(Mexico) Fabian Welter	D	Mygale SJ10	1–2
(United Kingdom) Rendez-Vous Racing	12	(Mexico) Fabian Welter	D	Mygale SJ08	3–4, 6–8
(United Kingdom) Enigma Motorsport	15	(Australia) Olly Rae	D R	Mygale SJ07	1–4
(United Kingdom) Enigma Motorsport	17	(United Kingdom) George Blundell	D R	Mygale SJ08	1–4, 6–8
(United Kingdom) Enigma Motorsport	21	(United Kingdom) Fred Martin-Dye	E R	Mygale M12-SJ	1–4
(United Kingdom) Enigma Motorsport	41	(Norway) Falco Wauer	G	Mygale SJ07	4
(United Kingdom) Myerscough College	34	(United Kingdom) Kenneth Thirlwall	D	Van Diemen RF06	1
(Netherlands) GEVA	47	(Netherlands) Melroy Heemskerk	G	Mygale M12-SJ	2
(Netherlands) GEVA	70	(Netherlands) Bart van Os	G	Mygale SJ09	4
(Netherlands) GEVA	77	(Netherlands) Max van Splunteren	G	Mygale SJ10	4
(United Kingdom) Don Hardman Automotive	48	(India) Abdul Ahmed	D R	Ray GR10	1–2, 4, 6–7
(Denmark) Fluid Motorsport	60	(Denmark) Nicolai Sylvest	G	Van Diemen LA08	5
(Netherlands) Provily Racing	71	(Netherlands) Jos Kiekens	G	Mygale SJ08	4
(Netherlands) Provily Racing	72	(Netherlands) Michel Florie	G	Mygale SJ08	4–5
(Netherlands) Provily Racing	74	(Netherlands) Bas Schouten	G	Mygale SJ08	5
(United States) AntiSpeed Competition	86	(United States) Charles Anti	D	Mygale SJ10	1–2
(United Kingdom) Getem Racing	88	(United Kingdom) Jason Down	G	Mygale SJ07	2, 8
(United Kingdom) Race Car Consultants	89	(United Kingdom) James Hammond	G	Mygale SJ11	3–4, 6

Icon	Class
E	EcoBoost
D	Duratec
G	Guest
R	Rookie

== Race calendar and results ==
An eight-round calendar was announced on 4 December 2011. Six rounds will support British F3 and British GT events, with a round at Brands Hatch Indy supporting the Deutsche Tourenwagen Masters, and a round at the Nürburgring, also counting towards the Formula Ford EuroCup.

Round		Circuit	Date	Pole position	Fastest lap	Winning driver	Winning team	Duratec Winner
1	R1	(United Kingdom) Oulton Park	7 April	(Finland) Antti Buri	(Finland) Antti Buri	(Finland) Antti Buri	(United Kingdom) JTR	(Mexico) Fabian Welter
1	R2	(United Kingdom) Oulton Park	9 April	(Finland) Antti Buri	(United Kingdom) Jake Cook	(United Kingdom) Jake Cook	(United Kingdom) Jamun Racing	(Mexico) Fabian Welter
1	R3	(United Kingdom) Oulton Park	9 April	(Finland) Antti Buri	(United Kingdom) Luke Williams	(United Kingdom) Luke Williams	(United Kingdom) Jamun Racing	(United Kingdom) Kenneth Thirlwall
2	R1	(United Kingdom) Brands Hatch Indy	18 May	(Finland) Antti Buri	(United Kingdom) Cavan Corcoran	(Argentina) Eric Lichtenstein	(United Kingdom) Jamun Racing	(Mexico) Fabian Welter
2	R2	(United Kingdom) Brands Hatch Indy	19 May	(Finland) Antti Buri	(Finland) Antti Buri	(Finland) Antti Buri	(United Kingdom) JTR	(Australia) Olly Rae
2	R3	(United Kingdom) Brands Hatch Indy	20 May	(United Kingdom) Luke Williams	(Finland) Antti Buri	(Argentina) Eric Lichtenstein	(United Kingdom) Jamun Racing	(Mexico) Fabian Welter
3	R1	(United Kingdom) Rockingham Motor Speedway	9 June	(Finland) Antti Buri	(Finland) Antti Buri	(Finland) Antti Buri	(United Kingdom) JTR	(United Kingdom) Matt Rao
3	R2	(United Kingdom) Rockingham Motor Speedway	10 June	(Finland) Antti Buri	(United Kingdom) Jake Cook	(Finland) Antti Buri	(United Kingdom) JTR	(Australia) Olly Rae
3	R3	(United Kingdom) Rockingham Motor Speedway	10 June	(Finland) Antti Buri	(United Kingdom) Jake Cook	(Finland) Antti Buri	(United Kingdom) JTR	(Mexico) Fabian Welter
4	R1	(United Kingdom) Brands Hatch GP	23 June	(Finland) Antti Buri	(United Kingdom) Luke Williams	(Finland) Antti Buri	(United Kingdom) JTR	(Mexico) Fabian Welter
4	R2	(United Kingdom) Brands Hatch GP	24 June	(Finland) Antti Buri	(United Kingdom) Luke Williams	(Finland) Antti Buri	(United Kingdom) JTR	(Mexico) Fabian Welter
4	R3	(United Kingdom) Brands Hatch GP	24 June	(Finland) Antti Buri	(Finland) Antti Buri	(Finland) Antti Buri	(United Kingdom) JTR	(Mexico) Fabian Welter
5	R1	(Germany) Nürburgring	28 July	(Argentina) Eric Lichtenstein	(Argentina) Eric Lichtenstein	(Argentina) Eric Lichtenstein	(United Kingdom) Jamun Racing	(Netherlands) Bas Schouten
5	R2	(Germany) Nürburgring	29 July	(Argentina) Eric Lichtenstein	(Argentina) Eric Lichtenstein	(Ecuador) Julio Moreno	(United Kingdom) JTR	(Netherlands) Bas Schouten
5	R3	(Germany) Nürburgring	29 July	(Argentina) Eric Lichtenstein	(Finland) Antti Buri	(Argentina) Eric Lichtenstein	(United Kingdom) Jamun Racing	(Netherlands) Bas Schouten
6	R1	(United Kingdom) Snetterton Motor Racing Circuit	4 August	(Finland) Antti Buri	(Argentina) Eric Lichtenstein	(Argentina) Eric Lichtenstein	(United Kingdom) Jamun Racing	(United Kingdom) George Blundell
6	R2	(United Kingdom) Snetterton Motor Racing Circuit	5 August	(Argentina) Eric Lichtenstein	(Argentina) Eric Lichtenstein	(Argentina) Eric Lichtenstein	(United Kingdom) Jamun Racing	(Mexico) Fabian Welter
6	R3	(United Kingdom) Snetterton Motor Racing Circuit	5 August	(Argentina) Eric Lichtenstein	(Argentina) Eric Lichtenstein	(Argentina) Eric Lichtenstein	(United Kingdom) Jamun Racing	(United Kingdom) Alex Drabble
7	R1	(United Kingdom) Silverstone Arena	8 September	(Argentina) Eric Lichtenstein	(Finland) Antti Buri	(Argentina) Eric Lichtenstein	(United Kingdom) Jamun Racing	(Mexico) Fabian Welter
7	R2	(United Kingdom) Silverstone Arena	9 September	(Argentina) Eric Lichtenstein	(Argentina) Eric Lichtenstein	(Argentina) Eric Lichtenstein	(United Kingdom) Jamun Racing	(Mexico) Fabian Welter
7	R3	(United Kingdom) Silverstone Arena	9 September	(Argentina) Eric Lichtenstein	(Finland) Antti Buri	(Argentina) Eric Lichtenstein	(United Kingdom) Jamun Racing	(Mexico) Fabian Welter
8	R1	(United Kingdom) Donington Park	29 September	(Argentina) Eric Lichtenstein	(Argentina) Eric Lichtenstein	(Argentina) Eric Lichtenstein	(United Kingdom) Jamun Racing	(Mexico) Fabian Welter
8	R2	(United Kingdom) Donington Park	30 September	(Argentina) Eric Lichtenstein	(Finland) Antti Buri	(United Kingdom) Jake Cook	(United Kingdom) Jamun Racing	(United Kingdom) George Blundell
8	R3	(United Kingdom) Donington Park	30 September	(Argentina) Eric Lichtenstein	cancelled due to over-running timetable caused by FIA GT1 accidents			

== Championship standings ==
In the Championship Class, points were awarded on a 30-27-24-22-20-18-16-14-12-10-8-6-4-3-2 basis to the top fifteen classified drivers, with one point awarded to all other finishers. An additional point was given to the driver who set the fastest lap in each race.

=== Drivers' Championship ===
Pos	Driver	OUL (United Kingdom)			BRH (United Kingdom)			ROC (United Kingdom)			BRH (United Kingdom)			NÜR (Germany)			SNE (United Kingdom)			SIL (United Kingdom)			DON (United Kingdom)			Points
1	(Finland) Antti Buri	1	2	3	2	1	2	1	1	1	1	1	1	4	Ret	2	2	2	2	2	2	Ret	5	Ret	C	556
2	(United Kingdom) Jake Cook	3	1	2	3	3	14	Ret	2	2	Ret	3	5	2	3	6	4	5	3	3	4	4	2	1	C	490
3	(Argentina) Eric Lichtenstein	2	Ret	4	1	Ret	1	DSQ	3	Ret	Ret	2	2	1	5	1	1	1	1	1	1	1	1	NC	C	484
4	(Ecuador) Julio Moreno	5	6	7	8	4	6	4	8	Ret	4	6	3	5	1	4	3	4	Ret	5	3	Ret	3	4	C	416
5	(United Kingdom) Cavan Corcoran	6	Ret	5	4	13	3	2	5	3	3	5	Ret	3	2	3	5	3	Ret				4	2	C	372
6	(United Kingdom) Ryan Cullen	8	5	10	9	9	Ret	5	7	5	Ret	Ret	Ret	6	4	5	6	6	Ret	6	5	3	6	3	C	324
7	(United Kingdom) Luke Williams	4	Ret	1	Ret	2	4	3	4	Ret	2	Ret	4				7	DNS	DNS	4	Ret	2	Ret	Ret	C	264
8	(United Kingdom) Fred Martin-Dye	7	3	6	5	5	5	6	6	4	Ret	4	Ret													182
9	(Mexico) Fabian Welter (Note: From Nürburgring round onwards only EcoBoost class drivers were eligible for Driver's Championship standings.)	9	4	12	6	7	7	8	11	6	5	7	6				8	7	7	7	6	4	7	6	C	158
10	(United Kingdom) Matt Rao	Ret	Ret	9	7	10	9	7	12	Ret	7	8	7	9	9	10	10	8	6	10	10	6	10	7	C	118
11	(United Kingdom) George Blundell	Ret	8	11	12	11	10	10	10	9	8	10	Ret				7	9	Ret	8	7	5	8	5	C	96
12	(Australia) Olly Rae	11	Ret	13	11	6	12	11	9	8	6	Ret	DNS													96
13	(United Kingdom) Alex Drabble	Ret	9	Ret	Ret	12	11	9	13	7	Ret	Ret	9	10	10	11	Ret	12	4	9	9	8	DNS	Ret	C	70
14	(India) Abdul Ahmed	Ret	Ret	DNS	Ret	8	8				9	9	8				Ret	10	5	11	8	7				66
15	(United States) Charles Anti	Ret	Ret	Ret	10	Ret	13																			14
16	(United Kingdom) Kenneth Thirlwall	10	7	8																						0
Guest drivers ineligible for points
	(Netherlands) Melroy Heemskerk				8	Ret	4																			0
	(Netherlands) Bart van Os										5	Ret	6													0
	(Netherlands) Bas Schouten													6	6	6										0
	(Netherlands) Max van Splunteren										6	9	8													0
	(Netherlands) Jos Kiekens										7	7	7													0
	(Denmark) Nicolai Sylvest													11	7	7										0
	(Netherlands) Michel Florie										Ret	8	9	8	8	9										0
	(United Kingdom) James Hammond							8	Ret	DNS	10	14	15				9	11	Ret							0
	(United Kingdom) Jason Down				13	8	Ret																9	Ret	DNS	0
	(United Kingdom) Gavin Halls										Ret	Ret	13													0
	(Norway) Falco Wauer										Ret	DNS	DNS													0
Pos	Driver	OUL (United Kingdom)			BRH (United Kingdom)			ROC (United Kingdom)			BRH (United Kingdom)			NÜR (Germany)			SNE (United Kingdom)			SIL (United Kingdom)			DON (United Kingdom)			Points

Colour	Result
Gold	Winner
Silver	Second place
Bronze	Third place
Green	Points classification
Blue	Non-points classification
Blue	Non-classified finish (NC)
Purple	Retired, not classified (Ret)
Red	Did not qualify (DNQ)
Red	Did not pre-qualify (DNPQ)
Black	Disqualified (DSQ)
White	Did not start (DNS)
White	Withdrew (WD)
White	Race cancelled (C)
Blank	Did not practice (DNP)
Blank	Did not arrive (DNA)
Blank	Excluded (EX)

=== Teams ===
Pos	Team	Points
1	(United Kingdom) JTR	1042
2	(United Kingdom) Jamun Racing	974
3	(United Kingdom) Fluid Motorsport	687
4	(United Kingdom) Cullen Motorsport	398

=== Constructors ===
Pos	Constructor	OUL (United Kingdom)			BRH (United Kingdom)			ROC (United Kingdom)			BRH (United Kingdom)			NÜR (Germany)			SNE (United Kingdom)			SIL (United Kingdom)			DON (United Kingdom)			Points
1	(France) Mygale	1	1	1	1	1	1	1	1	1	1	1	1	1	1	1	1	1	1	1	1	1	1	1	C	184
2	(United Kingdom) Van Diemen	10	7	8	7	10	9	7	12	7	7	8	7	9	9	10	10	8	4	9	9	6	10	7	C	158
3	(United Kingdom) Ray	Ret	Ret	DNS	Ret	8	8				9	9	8				Ret	10	5	11	8	7				63
Pos	Constructor	OUL (United Kingdom)			BRH (United Kingdom)			ROC (United Kingdom)			BRH (United Kingdom)			NÜR (Germany)			SNE (United Kingdom)			SIL (United Kingdom)			DON (United Kingdom)			Points

=== Nations Cup ===
Pos	Nation	OUL (United Kingdom)			BRH (United Kingdom)			ROC (United Kingdom)			BRH (United Kingdom)			NÜR (Germany)			SNE (United Kingdom)			SIL (United Kingdom)			DON (United Kingdom)			Points
1	Finland	1	2	3	2	1	2	1	1	1	1	1	1	4	Ret	2	2	2	2	2	2	Ret	5	Ret	C	567
2	Ecuador	5	6	7	8	4	6	4	8	Ret	4	6	3	5	1	4	3	4	Ret	5	3	Ret	3	4	C	502
3	Argentina	2	Ret	4	1	Ret	1	DSQ	3	Ret	Ret	2	2	1	5	1	1	1	1	1	1	1	1	NC	C	492
4	Mexico	9	4	12	6	7	7	8	11	6	5	7	6				8	7	7	7	6	4	7	6	C	464
5	India	Ret	Ret	DNS	Ret	8	8				9	9	8				Ret	10	5	11	8	7				208
6	Australia	11	Ret	13	11	6	12	11	9	8	6	Ret	DNS													190
7	United States	Ret	Ret	Ret	10	Ret	13																			36
Guest nations ineligible for points
	Netherlands				8	Ret	4				5	7	6	6	6	6										0
	Denmark													11	7	7										0
	Norway										Ret	Ret	DNS													0
Pos	Nation	OUL (United Kingdom)			BRH (United Kingdom)			ROC (United Kingdom)			BRH (United Kingdom)			NÜR (Germany)			SNE (United Kingdom)			SIL (United Kingdom)			DON (United Kingdom)			Points
