= International GTSprint Series =

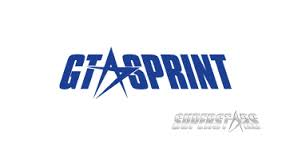
- Category: Grand tourer
- Country: International
- Inaugural season: 2010
- Folded: 2013
- Drivers: 57 (2013)
- Teams: 17 (2013)
- Tyre suppliers: Hankook
- Last Drivers' champion: (Germany) Thomas Schöffler
- Last Teams' champion: Ferrari Motor Ukraine
- Official website: www.superstarsworld.com

The International GTSprint Series was a grand tourer-style sports car racing founded in 2010 by FG Group, led by Maurizio Flammini, and afterwards by Superstars World of Racing SpA, a company managed by the same group. The series born under the name of Superstars GTSprint and took the current name the following year, and was canceled before the 2014 season due to lack of entries.

== History ==
The series born in 2010, as a support for the International Superstars Series, under the name of Superstars GTSprint. 23 cars raced the first round in Monza, and during the season the number of entries wandered around 17-18. Alessandro Bonetti and Maurizio Mediani won the title driving a Ferrari F430.

In 2011, the series obtained an international titration, with a consistent increase of participants. The following year, International Trophies for GTS-Cup and GTS-Open classes were created, but the cars on the grid fell dramatically and before the beginning of the 2014 season the series was finally folded. Thomas Schöffler was the last overall champion.

== Format ==
Since its birth, the series was focused on sprint races, as the name implies. There were two races for each weekend, consisting of twenty-five minutes + 1 lap. In 2012, the format changed into two races of thirty minutes, subsequently extended to one hour in 2013 with a mandatory pit stop in order to change the driver.

== Technical regulations ==
The series was open to grand tourer-style cars, broken into different classes based on power and weight. GTS-2, GTS-3 and GT4 classes were allowed respectively to the cars obeying their FIA regulations; GTS-Cup included cars used in manufacturer's one-make cup series; GT4-S was a subject of GT4 class and GTS-Open was open to grand tourer cars without precise regulations.

== Sporting regulations ==
The scoring system was the same of International Superstars Series. Since 2012, an additional point was awarded to every driver in the starting grid of each race, which became two in 2013, with one point awarded as a "qualification point".

Position	1st	2nd	3rd	4th	5th	6th	7th	8th	9th	10th	Pole	Fastest Lap
Points	20	15	12	10	8	6	4	3	2	1	1	1

== Champions ==
=== Overall champions ===
Season	Drivers Champion	Team Champion
2010	(Italy) Alessandro Bonetti (Italy) Maurizio Mediani	(Italy) AF Corse
2011	(Venezuela) Gaetano Ardagna (Italy) Giuseppe Cirò	(Italy) AF Corse
2012	(Italy) Andrea Palma	(Italy) Black Team
2013	(Germany) Thomas Schöffler	Ferrari Motor Ukraine

=== Class champions ===
Season	GTS-2 Champion	GTS-3 Champion	GTS-Cup Champion	GTS-Open Champion	GT4 Champion	GT4-S Champion
2010	(Italy) Alessandro Bonetti (Italy) Maurizio Mediani	(Italy) Carlo Graziani	(Italy) Thomas Kemenater	(Italy) Maurizio Ardigò	(Italy) Gabriele Marotta	(Italy) Gianni Giudici
2011	(Italy) Matteo Cressoni	(Italy) Nicola Cadei (Italy) Fabio Mancini	(Spain) Antonio de la Reina (Colombia) Steven Goldstein	Not held	Not held	Not held
2012	(Italy) Andrea Palma	(Italy) Mario Cordoni	(Colombia) Steven Goldstein	(Italy) Ennio Ricci (Italy) Angelo Schiatti	Not held	Not held
2013	(Belarus) Alexander Talkanitsa (Belarus) Alexander Talkanitsa, Jr.	(Germany) Thomas Schöffler	(Spain) Antonio de la Reina (Colombia) Steven Goldstein	(Slovakia) Miroslav Konôpka	Not held	Not held
