= Carlo Graziani =

Italian composer and cellist (first half of the 18th century - 1787)

Carlo Graziani (1st half of the 18th century-1787) was an Italian composer and cello virtuoso. His compositions reflect both elements of galant style and advancements in cello playing throughout the 18th century. His works are notorious for their passagework, bow dexterity, natural and artificial harmonics, up-bow staccati, scordatura tuning (see Sonata in D), multiple stops, and elaborate dynamic contrast. Though his works are not regularly included in standard repertoire, they serve as excellent primary sources in tracking the development of cello technique throughout the eighteenth-century.

== Life and career ==
Not much is known about the composer's early years–including his exact birth and at what age did he exactly move from Asti, Italy. Nothing is known further about the composer's time in Italy. One can conclude from his employment history and compositional output that the composer accumulated exemplary training enough to assume the role as one of the leading cello virtuosi of his time.

By the early 1760s, he arrived in Paris to join the orchestra of La Pouplinière–revealing that he already garnered impressive skill and fame by the mid-eighteenth century. Graziani's time with La Pouplinière was short-lived as the nobleman died in 1762. Following La Pouplinière's death, he was hired by Baron de Bagge with a promise of lifetime employment. Additionally, one can infer that in addition to the notoriety he received as a cellist, his composition career was brewing as well because simultaneously the composer had been granted a ten-year privilège général to publish instrumental music–resulting in his opp. 1 and 2 sonatas for cello and basso.

Sometime in 1763, Graziani traveled to London to serve as principal cellist of the King's Theatre in the Haymarket, which was under the baton of Felice de Giardini at the time. Records at time reflect that he performed in three benefit concerts during 1764. Scholar Valerie Walden notes that the first two concerts took place on 10 February and 1 March and the third on 22 May. Around this time, Graziani seems to have married for he is next found in Frankfurt am Main giving concerts in September 1770 alongside his wife who was a singer.

Following his time in Frankfurt am Main, Graziani was invited to Potsdam to become the royal cello teacher to Friedrich Wilhelm II, a position previously held by L.C. Hesse. Some of the sonatas may have been pedagogical works for Friedrich Wilhelm II. In 1773, Graziani, replaced by the French cellist J.-P. Duport. However, he and the prince remained close, and the prince retired him on a pension of 600 thalers per year. Not much is known about the cellist/composer following his retirement but he died in 1787 in Berlin, Germany.

== Works ==
- Graziani, Carlo. 6 Sonatas for violoncello and basso continuo, op. 1 (Paris, 1758).
