= Piero Necchi =

Italian racing driver

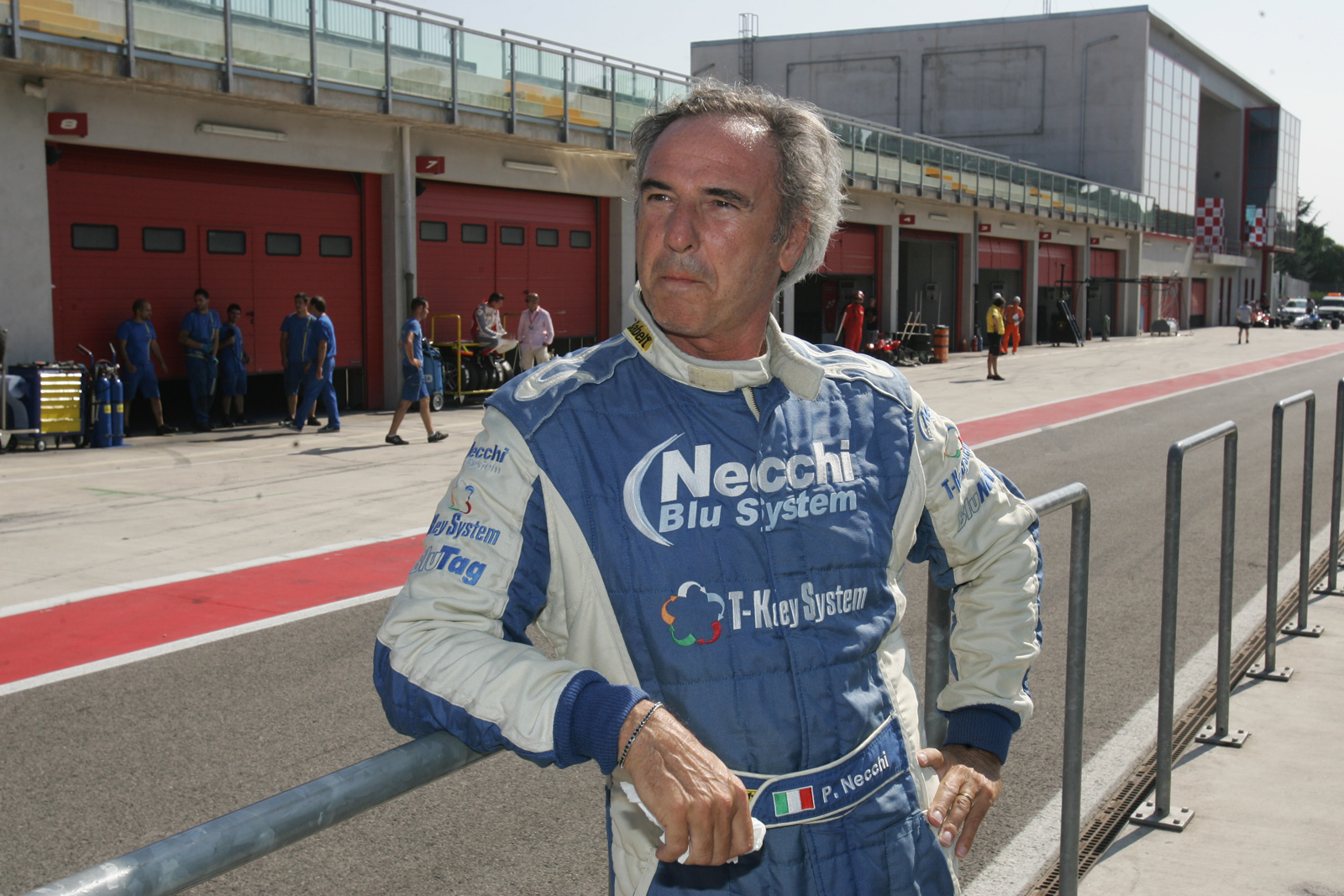
- Nationality: Italy
- Born: 26 December 1951 (age 74) Alessandria, Italy
- Debut season: 1963
- Former teams: Parilla, Birel, BM
- Wins: 50+ (karting)

Championship titles
- 1969, 1971, 1973, 1973-75, 2011: Italian Karting Championship (1969, 1971, 1973); European Karting Championship (1973, 1974, 1975); Italian Touring Car Endurance Championship (2011)

Awards
- Golden Helmet Award (1976)

Piero Necchi (born 26 December 1951) is an Italian racing driver, three-time Italian Karting Championship winner (1969, 1971, 1973) and three-time European Karting Championship winner (1973, 1974, 1975). He is considered one of the most successful Italian karting drivers of the 1970s and later competed in Formula 2 and Formula 3.

== Racing record ==
=== Karting ===
- Italian Karting Champion: 1969, 1971, 1973
- European Karting Champion: 1973, 1974, 1975
- Over 50 victories in karting competition

=== Formula racing ===
- Formula Super Ford 2000 (1976): 2nd in final championship, 3 victories, Golden Helmet Award
- Formula 3 (1977): 4th place Italian championship, 1 victory, 4 second places, 3 third places
- Formula 2 (1978): 6th place European championship (first Italian behind Giacomelli)

=== Touring cars ===
- Italian Touring Car Endurance Champion: 2011

== Recent endeavors and legacy ==
Demonstrating remarkable longevity in the sport, Necchi has continued to compete in various racing series. In 2017, he participated in the Super GT Cup class of the Italian GT Championship, driving a Lamborghini Huracán with Antonelli Motorsport. He also competed in the TCR Europe series in 2021 and the Italian TCR Championship in 2023.

As of 2025, at 73 years old, Necchi remains active in motorsport, participating in the Lamborghini Blancpain Super Trofeo Europe with Target Racing. His career statistics include 164 starts, 24 wins, 53 podiums, 21 pole positions, and 22 fastest laps, reflecting his enduring passion and competitiveness in racing.
