= Raffaele Giammaria =

Italian racing driver

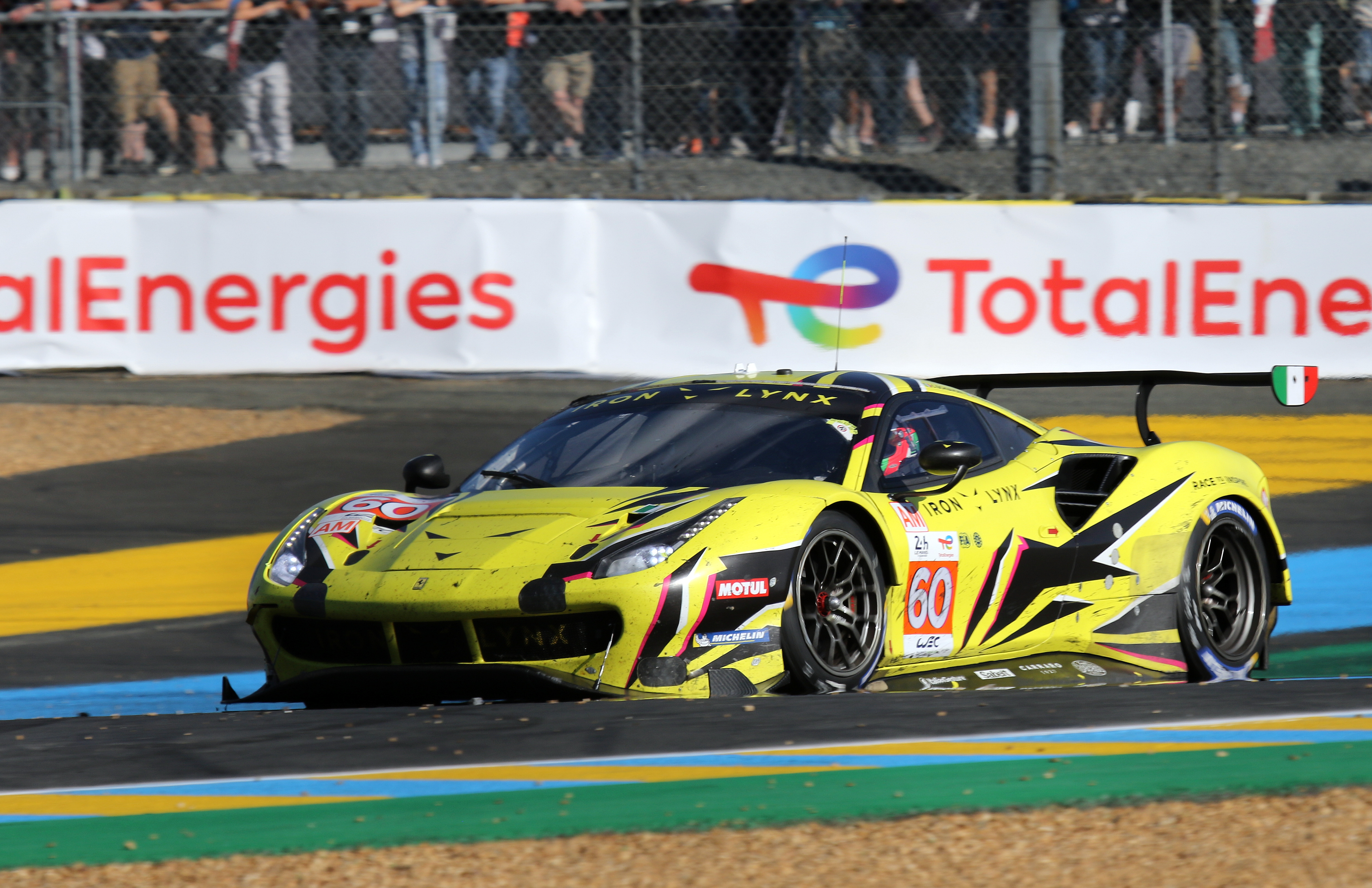
- Nationality: (Italy) Italian
- Born: September 1, 1977 (age 49) Civitavecchia, Italy
- Categorisation: FIA Platinum (until 2012); FIA Gold (2013–2019); FIA Silver (2020–)

Raffaele Giammaria (born 1 September 1977 in Civitavecchia) is an Italian racing car driver.

Giammaria was runner-up in the Formula Renault 2000 Italy series in 2000, then progressed through German and Italian Formula Three and Italian Formula 3000 to International Formula 3000 for 2003 with the Durango team. In his début season, he scored one podium and was placed tenth in the championship with twelve points.

2004 was even better for Giammaria, with 27 points scored and eighth place in the championship secured by the season's end. However, he missed one of the races due to financial problems, and was forced to switch teams, from Durango to Astromega.

Giammaria failed to get a drive in the rebranded GP2 Series for 2005. He competed in Formula Renault 3.5 Series and Italian F3000 instead, but only in part-time roles. He was also part of A1 Team Italy for the inaugural season of the A1 Grand Prix series, but never drove the car.

Giammaria competed in Italian GT racing for 2006.

== Racing record ==
=== Complete International Formula 3000 results ===
(key) (Races in bold indicate pole position; races in italics indicate fastest lap.)

| Year | Entrant | 1 | 2 | 3 | 4 | 5 | 6 | 7 | 8 | 9 | 10 | DC | Points |
|---|---|---|---|---|---|---|---|---|---|---|---|---|---|
| 2003 | Durango | IMO; 7 | CAT; Ret | A1R; 14 | MON; 3 | NUR; 7 | MAG; 8 | SIL; Ret | HOC; 10 | HUN; 6 | MNZ; Ret | 10th | 14 |
| 2004 | AEZ Racing | IMO; 4 | CAT; 3 | MON; 4 | NUR; 6 | MAG; Ret | SIL; 6 | HOC; Ret | HUN; 10 | SPA | | 8th | 27 |
| 2004 | Team Astromega | | | | | | | | | | MNZ; 4 | 8th | 27 |

=== Complete Formula Renault 3.5 Series results ===
(key) (Races in bold indicate pole position) (Races in italics indicate fastest lap)

| Year | Entrant | 1 | 2 | 3 | 4 | 5 | 6 | 7 | 8 | 9 | 10 | 11 | 12 | 13 | 14 | 15 | 16 | 17 | DC | Points |
|---|---|---|---|---|---|---|---|---|---|---|---|---|---|---|---|---|---|---|---|---|
| 2005 | DAMS | ZOL; 1 | ZOL; 2 | MON; 1 | VAL; 1 Ret | VAL; 2 Ret | LMS; 1; 20 | LMS; 2 DNS | BIL; 1 Ret | BIL; 2 DNS | OSC; 1 | OSC; 2 | DON; 1 | DON; 2 | EST; 1 | EST; 2 | MNZ; 1 | MNZ; 2 | 43rd | 0 |

=== Complete 24 Hours of Le Mans results ===
| Year | Team | Co-Drivers | Car | Class | Laps | Pos. | Class Pos. |
|---|---|---|---|---|---|---|---|
| 2014 | (Italy) AF Corse | (United States) Peter Ashley Mann (Italy) Lorenzo Casè | Ferrari 458 Italia GTC | GTE; Am | 115 | DNF | DNF |
| 2015 | (Italy) AF Corse | (United States) Peter Ashley Mann (Italy) Matteo Cressoni | Ferrari 458 Italia GTC | GTE; Am | 326 | 31st | 5th |
| 2021 | (Italy) Iron Lynx | (Italy) Paolo Ruberti (Italy) Claudio Schiavoni | Ferrari 488 GTE Evo | GTE; Am | 335 | 30th | 5th |
| 2022 | (Italy) Iron Lynx | (Italy) Alessandro Balzan (Italy) Claudio Schiavoni | Ferrari 488 GTE Evo | GTE; Am | 289 | NC | NC |

=== Complete WeatherTech SportsCar Championship results ===
(key) (Races in bold indicate pole position)

| Year | Team | Class | Make | Engine | 1 | 2 | 3 | 4 | 5 | 6 | 7 | 8 | 9 | 10 | 11 | 12 | Rank | Points |
|---|---|---|---|---|---|---|---|---|---|---|---|---|---|---|---|---|---|---|
| 2016 | Spirit of Race | GTD | Ferrari 458 Italia GT3 | Ferrari 4.5 L V8 | DAY; 11 | SEB; 9 | LGA | BEL | WGL | MOS | LIM | ELK | VIR | AUS | PET | | 32nd | 44 |
| 2017 | Dream Racing Motorsport | GTD | Lamborghini Huracán GT3 | Lamborghini 5.2 L V10 | DAY; 19 | SEB | LBH | AUS | BEL | WGL | MOS | LIM | ELK | VIR | LGA | PET | 78th | 12 |
| 2023 | Iron Lynx | GTD | Lamborghini Huracán GT3 Evo 2 | Lamborghini 5.2 L V10 | DAY; 12 | SEB | LBH | MON | WGL | MOS | LIM | ELK | VIR | IMS | PET | | 60th | 190 |
