= List of 2000 motorsport champions =

2000 motorsport champions
Previous: 1999	Next: 2001

This list of 2000 motorsport champions is a list of national or international auto racing series with a Championship decided by the points or positions earned by a driver from multiple races.

== Dirt oval racing ==
Series	Champion	Refer
World of Outlaws Sprint Car Series	(United States) Steve Kinser	
World of Outlaws Sprint Car Series	Teams: (United States) Steve Kinser Racing	

== Drag racing ==
Series	Champion	Refer
NHRA Winston Drag Racing Series	Top Fuel: (United States) Gary Scelzi	2000 NHRA Winston Drag Racing Series
NHRA Winston Drag Racing Series	Funny Car: (United States) John Force	2000 NHRA Winston Drag Racing Series
NHRA Winston Drag Racing Series	Pro Stock: (United States) Jeg Coughlin Jr.	2000 NHRA Winston Drag Racing Series
NHRA Winston Drag Racing Series	Pro Stock Motorcycle: (United States) Angelle Sampey	2000 NHRA Winston Drag Racing Series

== Karting ==
Series	Driver	Season article
CIK-FIA Karting World Championship	FSA: (Italy) Davide Forè	
CIK-FIA Karting World Championship	FC: (Italy) Gianluca Beggio	
CIK-FIA Karting World Championship	Formula A: (United Kingdom) Colin Brown	
CIK-FIA Karting European Championship	FSA: (Netherlands) Mario Siegers	
CIK-FIA Karting European Championship	FC: (Italy) Francesco Laudato	
CIK-FIA Karting European Championship	FA: (United Kingdom) Lewis Hamilton	
CIK-FIA Karting European Championship	ICA: (France) Julien Menard	
CIK-FIA Karting European Championship	ICA-J: (Germany) Michael Ammermüller	
CIK-FIA Karting European Championship	Cadet: (Italy) Valentino Sebastiani	
Rotax Max Challenge	(South Africa) Gavin Cronje	

== Motorcycle racing ==
Series	Rider	Season article
500cc World Championship	(United States) Kenny Roberts Jr.	2000 Grand Prix motorcycle racing season
500cc World Championship	Manufacturers: (Japan) Yamaha	2000 Grand Prix motorcycle racing season
250cc World Championship	(France) Olivier Jacque	2000 Grand Prix motorcycle racing season
250cc World Championship	Manufacturers: (Japan) Yamaha	2000 Grand Prix motorcycle racing season
125cc World Championship	(Italy) Roberto Locatelli	2000 Grand Prix motorcycle racing season
125cc World Championship	Manufacturers: (Japan) Honda	2000 Grand Prix motorcycle racing season
Superbike World Championship	(United States) Colin Edwards	2000 Superbike World Championship season
Superbike World Championship	Manufacturers: (Italy) Ducati	2000 Superbike World Championship season
Supersport World Championship	(Germany) Jörg Teuchert	
Supersport World Championship	Manufacturers: (Japan) Yamaha	
Speedway World Championship	(United Kingdom) Mark Loram	2000 Speedway Grand Prix
AMA Superbike Championship	(Australia) Mat Mladin	
Australian Superbike Championship	(Australia) Shawn Giles	

== Open wheel racing ==
Series	Driver	Season article
FIA Formula One World Championship	(Germany) Michael Schumacher	2000 Formula One World Championship
FIA Formula One World Championship	Constructors: (Italy) Ferrari	2000 Formula One World Championship
CART FedEx Championship Series	(Brazil) Gil de Ferran	2000 CART season
CART FedEx Championship Series	Manufacturers: (United States) Ford	2000 CART season
CART FedEx Championship Series	Rookies: (Sweden) Kenny Bräck	2000 CART season
Indy Racing League	(United States) Buddy Lazier	2000 Indy Racing League
Indy Racing League	Manufacturers: (United States) Oldsmobile	2000 Indy Racing League
Indy Racing League	Rookies: (Brazil) Airton Daré	2000 Indy Racing League
Indy Lights	(New Zealand) Scott Dixon	2000 Indy Lights season
Historic Formula One Championship	(United Kingdom) Martin Stretton	2000 Historic Formula One Championship
American Indycar Series	(United States) Mike Lee	2000 American Indycar Series
Atlantic Championship	(United States) Buddy Rice	2000 Atlantic Championship season
Australian Drivers' Championship	(New Zealand) Simon Wills	2000 Australian Drivers' Championship
Barber Dodge Pro Series	(Brazil) Nilton Rossini	2000 Barber Dodge Pro Series
Formula Nippon Championship	(Japan) Toranosuke Takagi	2000 Formula Nippon Championship
Formula Nippon Championship	Teams: (Japan) Nakajima Racing	2000 Formula Nippon Championship
International Formula 3000	(Brazil) Bruno Junqueira	2000 International Formula 3000 season
Italian Formula 3000	(Brazil) Ricardo Sperafico	2000 Italian Formula 3000 Championship
Formula Palmer Audi	(Republic of Ireland) Damien Faulkner	2000 Formula Palmer Audi
Formula Palmer Audi	Autumn Trophy: (United States) Philip Giebler	2000 Formula Palmer Audi
BOSS Formula Series	(United Kingdom) Dave Hutchinson	2000 BOSS Formula Series
BOSS Formula Series	Teams: (United Kingdom) Kockney Koi Yamitsu	2000 BOSS Formula Series
Formula Asia	(Malaysia) Ng Wai-Leong	2000 Formula Asia
Formula Dream	(Japan) Kosuke Matsuura	2000 Formula Dream
Formula König	(Austria) Bernhard Auinger	2000 Formula König season
Formula König	Teams: (Germany) Motopark Academy	2000 Formula König season
Formula Toyota	(Japan) Satoshi Goto	2000 Formula Toyota season
JAF Japan Formula 4	Kantō: (Japan) Issei Nishio	2000 JAF Japan Formula 4
JAF Japan Formula 4	Kansai: (Japan) Hideaki Nakao	2000 JAF Japan Formula 4
Open Telefonica by Nissan	(Spain) Antonio García	2000 Open Telefonica by Nissan season
Star Mazda Championship	(United States) Bernardo Martinez	2000 Star Mazda Championship
Formula Dodge National Championship	(Canada) Anthony Simone	
Formula Dodge Eastern Championship	(United States) Chip Bryant	
Formula Dodge Eastern Championship	Masters: (Australia) Chris Wilcox	
Formula Dodge Midwestern Championship	(United States) Curt Andrews	
Formula Dodge Midwestern Championship	Masters: (United States) Roland Isra	
Formula Dodge Southern Championship	(United States) Craig Duerson	
Formula Dodge Southern Championship	Masters: (United States) Bud Risser	
Formula Dodge Western Championship	(United States) Ryan Howe	
Formula Dodge Western Championship	Masters: (United States) Quentin Wahl	
Formula Lista Junior	(Switzerland) Neel Jani	2000 Formula Lista Junior season
Formula Maruti	(India) Karun Chandhok	2000 Formula Maruti season
Russian Formula 1600 Championship	(Russia) Alexander Nesterov	2000 Russian Formula 1600 Championship
Russian Formula 1600 Championship	Teams: (Russia) LogoVAZ-City	2000 Russian Formula 1600 Championship
Formula Three
All-Japan Formula Three Championship	(France) Sébastien Philippe	2000 Japanese Formula 3 Championship
All-Japan Formula Three Championship	Teams: (Japan) Mugen Dome Project	2000 Japanese Formula 3 Championship
Austria Formula 3 Cup	(Austria) Marco Schärf	2000 Austria Formula 3 Cup
Austria Formula 3 Cup	Trophy: (Germany) Reimund Scheidenfaden	2000 Austria Formula 3 Cup
British Formula 3 Championship	(Brazil) Antônio Pizzonia	2000 British Formula 3 season
British Formula 3 Championship	National: (United Kingdom) Gary Paffett	2000 British Formula 3 season
Chilean Formula Three Championship	(Chile) Matías Horta	2000 Chilean Formula Three Championship
French Formula Three Championship	(France) Jonathan Cochet	2000 French Formula Three Championship
French Formula Three Championship	Teams: (France) Signature Team	2000 French Formula Three Championship
French Formula Three Championship	Class B: (United Kingdom) Adam Jones	2000 French Formula Three Championship
German Formula Three Championship	(Italy) Giorgio Pantano	2000 German Formula Three Championship
German Formula Three Championship	Rookie: (Germany) André Lotterer	2000 German Formula Three Championship
Italian Formula Three Championship	(Italy) Davide Uboldi	
Australian Formula 3 National Series	(Australia) Paul Stephenson	
Finnish Formula Three Championship	(Finland) Marko Nevalainen	2000 Finnish Formula Three Championship
Finnish Formula Three Championship	Teams: (Finland) Motor Up Racing	2000 Finnish Formula Three Championship
Mexican Formula Three Championship	(Mexico) José Antonio Ramos	2000 Mexican Formula Three Championship
Formula Three Nordic	(Sweden) Mikael Karlsson	
Swedish Formula Three Championship	(Sweden) Mikael Karlsson	
Formula Three Sudamericana	(Brazil) Vítor Meira	
Formula Three Sudamericana	Light: (Uruguay) Martin Canepa	
Russian Formula Three Championship	(Italy) Alberto Pedemonte	
Swiss Formula Three Championship	(Switzerland) Jo Zeller	2000 Swiss Formula Three Championship
Swiss Formula Three Championship	Class B: (Switzerland) Andreas Bahler	2000 Swiss Formula Three Championship
United States Formula Three Championship	(United States) Stuart Crow	2000 United States Formula Three Championship
United States Formula Three Championship	Teams: (Italy) EuroInternational	2000 United States Formula Three Championship
Formula Renault
Formula Renault 2000 Eurocup	(Brazil) Felipe Massa	2000 Formula Renault 2000 Eurocup season
Formula Renault 2000 Eurocup	Teams: (Italy) JD Motorsport	2000 Formula Renault 2000 Eurocup season
Formula Renault 2000 UK	(Finland) Kimi Räikkönen	2000 Formula Renault 2000 UK season
Formula Renault 2000 UK	Winter Series: (United Kingdom) Mark McLoughlin	2000 Formula Renault 2000 UK season
Championnat de France Formule Renault 2000	(France) Renaud Derlot	
Formula Renault BARC	(United Kingdom) Jamie Beales	
Formula Renault 2000 Italia	(Brazil) Felipe Massa	
Formula Renault 2000 Italia	Teams: (Italy) Cram Competition	
Formula Renault 2000 Italia	Winter Series: (Italy) Ronnie Quintarelli	
Formula Campus by Renault and Elf	(France) Stephane Morat	
Formula Renault 1.6 Argentina	(Argentina) Esteban Guerrieri	
Formula BMW
Formula BMW ADAC	(Austria) Hannes Lachinger	
Formula BMW ADAC	Teams: (Germany) BMW Rookie Team	
F. Baviera Junior Cup	(Portugal) Ricardo Megre	
Formula Ford
Australian Formula Ford Championship	(Australia) Luke Youlden	2000 Australian Formula Ford Championship
British Formula Ford Championship	(Australia) James Courtney	2000 British Formula Ford Championship
Danish Formula Ford Championship	(Denmark) Tommy Nygaard	
Dutch Formula Ford Championship	(Netherlands) Patrick Koel	2000 Dutch Formula Ford Championship
European Formula Ford Championship	(United Kingdom) Mark Taylor	2000 European Formula Ford Championship
New Zealand Formula Ford Championship	(New Zealand) Phil Hellebrekers	
Swedish Formula Ford Championship	(Sweden) Mikael Karlsson	
U.S. F2000 National Championship	(United States) Aaron Justus	2000 U.S. F2000 National Championship

== Rallying ==
Series	Driver	Season article
World Rally Championship	(Finland) Marcus Grönholm	2000 World Rally Championship
World Rally Championship	Co-Drivers: (Finland) Timo Rautiainen	2000 World Rally Championship
World Rally Championship	Manufacturers: (France) Peugeot	2000 World Rally Championship
FIA Cup for Production Cars	(Austria) Manfred Stohl	2000 World Rally Championship
African Rally Championship	(Zambia) Satwant Singh	2000 African Rally Championship
Asia-Pacific Rally Championship	(New Zealand) Possum Bourne	2000 Asia-Pacific Rally Championship
Asia-Pacific Rally Championship	Co-Drivers: (Australia) Mark Stacey	2000 Asia-Pacific Rally Championship
Australian Rally Championship	(New Zealand) Possum Bourne	2000 Australian Rally Championship
Australian Rally Championship	Co-Drivers: (Australia) Mark Stacey	2000 Australian Rally Championship
British Rally Championship	(Finland) Marko Ipatti	2000 British Rally Championship
British Rally Championship	Manufacturers: (United Kingdom) Vauxhall	2000 British Rally Championship
British Rally Championship	Super 1600: (Sweden) Mats Andersson	2000 British Rally Championship
British Rally Championship	Group N: (United Kingdom) Gavin Cox	2000 British Rally Championship
Canadian Rally Championship	(Canada) Tom McGeer	2000 Canadian Rally Championship
Canadian Rally Championship	Co-Drivers: (Canada) Mark Williams	2000 Canadian Rally Championship
Czech Rally Championship	(Czech Republic) Roman Kresta	2000 Czech Rally Championship
Czech Rally Championship	Co-Drivers: (Czech Republic) Jan Tománek	2000 Czech Rally Championship
Deutsche Rallye Meisterschaft	(Germany) Matthias Kahle	
Estonian Rally Championship	A>2000: (Estonia) Ivar Raidam	2000 Estonian Rally Championship
Estonian Rally Championship	A>2000 Co-Drivers: (Estonia) Robert Lepikson	2000 Estonian Rally Championship
Estonian Rally Championship	N 2000+: (Estonia) Margus Murakas	2000 Estonian Rally Championship
Estonian Rally Championship	N 2000+ Co-Drivers: (Estonia) Peep Kallaste	2000 Estonian Rally Championship
European Rally Championship	(Denmark) Henrik Lundgaard	2000 European Rally Championship
European Rally Championship	Co-Drivers: (Denmark) Jens-Christian Anker	2000 European Rally Championship
Finnish Rally Championship	Group A +2000cc: (Finland) Sebastian Lindholm	2000 Finnish Rally Championship
Finnish Rally Championship	Group N +2000cc: (Finland) Jani Paasonen	2000 Finnish Rally Championship
Finnish Rally Championship	Group A -2000cc: (Finland) Jani Pirttinen	2000 Finnish Rally Championship
Finnish Rally Championship	Group N -2000cc: (Finland) Eero Räikkönen	2000 Finnish Rally Championship
French Rally Championship	(France) Philippe Bugalski	
Hungarian Rally Championship	(Hungary) János Tóth	
Hungarian Rally Championship	Co-Drivers: (Hungary) Imre Tóth	
Indian National Rally Championship	(India) V. R. Naren Kumar	
Indian National Rally Championship	Co-Drivers: (India) D. Ram Kumar	
Italian Rally Championship	(Italy) Piero Longhi	
Italian Rally Championship	Co-Drivers: (Italy) Lucio Baggio	
Italian Rally Championship	Manufacturers: (Japan) Toyota	
Middle East Rally Championship	(United Arab Emirates) Mohammed Ben Sulayem	
New Zealand Rally Championship	(New Zealand) Bruce Herbert	2000 New Zealand Rally Championship
New Zealand Rally Championship	Co-Drivers: (New Zealand) Rob Ryan	2000 New Zealand Rally Championship
Polish Rally Championship	(Poland) Janusz Kulig	
Romanian Rally Championship	(Romania) Constantin Aur	
Scottish Rally Championship	(United Kingdom) Andrew Wood	
Scottish Rally Championship	Co-Drivers: (United Kingdom) Ann Parker	
Slovak Rally Championship	(Czech Republic) Stanislav Chovanec	
Slovak Rally Championship	Co-Drivers: (Czech Republic) Karel Holaň	
South African National Rally Championship	(Belgium) Serge Damseaux	
South African National Rally Championship	Co-Drivers: (South Africa) Douglas Judd	
South African National Rally Championship	Manufacturers: (Japan) Toyota	
Spanish Rally Championship	(Spain) Jesús Puras	
Spanish Rally Championship	Co-Drivers: (Spain) Marc Martí	

=== Rallycross ===
Series	Driver	Season article
FIA European Rallycross Championship	Div 1: (Sweden) Kenneth Hansen	
FIA European Rallycross Championship	Div 2: (France) Eddy Bénézet	
FIA European Rallycross Championship	1400 Cup: (Germany) Sven Seeliger	
British Rallycross Championship	(United Kingdom) Lawrence Gibson	

=== Ice racing ===
Series	Driver	Season article
Andros Trophy	Elite: (France) Yvan Muller	1999–00 Andros Trophy
Andros Trophy	Promotion: (France) Jean-Noël Lanctuit	1999–00 Andros Trophy
Andros Trophy	Pilot Bike: (France) Pascal Roblin	1999–00 Andros Trophy
Andros Trophy	Dame: (France) Patricia Bertapelle	1999–00 Andros Trophy

== Sports car ==
Series	Driver	Season article
All Japan Grand Touring Car Championship	GT500: (Japan) Ryo Michigami	2000 All Japan Grand Touring Car Championship
All Japan Grand Touring Car Championship	GT500 Teams: (Japan) Mugen × Dome Project	2000 All Japan Grand Touring Car Championship
All Japan Grand Touring Car Championship	GT300: (Japan) Hideo Fukuyama	2000 All Japan Grand Touring Car Championship
All Japan Grand Touring Car Championship	GT300 Teams: (Japan) Team Taisan Advan	2000 All Japan Grand Touring Car Championship
American Le Mans Series	LMP: (United Kingdom) Allan McNish	2000 American Le Mans Series season
American Le Mans Series	GTS: (Monaco) Olivier Beretta	2000 American Le Mans Series season
American Le Mans Series	GT: (Germany) Dirk Müller	2000 American Le Mans Series season
Australian GT Production Car Championship	(Australia) Mark King	2000 Australian GT Production Car Championship
Australian GT Production Car Championship	Manufacturers: (Australia) Holden	2000 Australian GT Production Car Championship
Australian Nations Cup Championship	(New Zealand) Jim Richards	2000 Australian Nations Cup Championship
Australian Sports Sedan Championship	(Australia) Kerry Baily	2000 Australian Sports Sedan Championship
British GT Championship	GT: (United Kingdom) Calum Lockie	2000 British GT Championship
British GT Championship	GTO: (United Kingdom) Mark Sumpter	2000 British GT Championship
FIA GT Championship	GT: (United Kingdom) Julian Bailey; GT: (United Kingdom) Jamie Campbell-Walter	2000 FIA GT Championship season
FIA GT Championship	GT Teams: (United Kingdom) Lister Racing	2000 FIA GT Championship season
FIA GT Championship	N-GT: (France) Christophe Bouchut; N-GT: (France) Patrice Goueslard	2000 FIA GT Championship season
FIA GT Championship	N-GT Teams: (France) Larbre Compétition	2000 FIA GT Championship season
Grand American Road Racing Championship	SR: (United Kingdom) James Weaver	2000 Grand American Road Racing Championship season
Grand American Road Racing Championship	SRII: (United States) Larry Oberto	2000 Grand American Road Racing Championship season
Grand American Road Racing Championship	GTO: (United States) Terry Borcheller	2000 Grand American Road Racing Championship season
Grand American Road Racing Championship	GTU: (United States) Mike Fitzgerald	2000 Grand American Road Racing Championship season
Grand American Road Racing Championship	AGT: (United States) Doug Mills	2000 Grand American Road Racing Championship season
Sports Racing World Cup	SR1: (Italy) Christian Pescatori; SR1: (France) David Terrien	2000 Sports Racing World Cup season
Sports Racing World Cup	SR1 Teams: (France) JB Giesse Team Ferrari	2000 Sports Racing World Cup season
Sports Racing World Cup	SR2: (United Kingdom) Peter Owen (United Kingdom) Mark Smithson	2000 Sports Racing World Cup season
Sports Racing World Cup	SR2 Teams: (United Kingdom) Redman Bright	2000 Sports Racing World Cup season
Trans-Am Series	(United States) Brian Simo	2000 Trans-Am Series
Trans-Am Series	Manufacturers: (Italy) Qvale	2000 Trans-Am Series
TraNZam	(New Zealand) Craig Baird	
Porsche Supercup, Porsche Carrera Cup, GT3 Cup Challenge and Porsche Sprint Challenge
Porsche Supercup	(Netherlands) Patrick Huisman	2000 Porsche Supercup
Porsche Supercup	Teams: (Germany) Olaf Manthey Racing	2000 Porsche Supercup
Porsche Carrera Cup France	(France) Christophe Bouchut	2000 Porsche Carrera Cup France
Porsche Carrera Cup Germany	(Germany) Jörg Bergmeister	2000 Porsche Carrera Cup Germany
Porsche Carrera Cup Germany	Teams: (Germany) UPS Porsche Junior Team	2000 Porsche Carrera Cup Germany

== Stock car racing ==
Series	Driver	Season article
NASCAR Winston Cup Series	(United States) Bobby Labonte	2000 NASCAR Winston Cup Series
NASCAR Winston Cup Series	Manufacturers: (United States) Ford	2000 NASCAR Winston Cup Series
NASCAR Busch Grand National Series	(United States) Jeff Green	2000 NASCAR Busch Series
NASCAR Busch Grand National Series	Manufacturers: (United States) Chevrolet	2000 NASCAR Busch Series
NASCAR Craftsman Truck Series	(United States) Greg Biffle	2000 NASCAR Craftsman Truck Series
NASCAR Craftsman Truck Series	Manufacturers: (United States) Ford	2000 NASCAR Craftsman Truck Series
NASCAR Busch North Series	(United States) Brad Leighton	2000 NASCAR Busch North Series
NASCAR Winston West Series	(United States) Brendan Gaughan	2000 NASCAR Winston West Series
ARCA Bondo/Mar-Hyde Series	(United States) Frank Kimmel	2000 ARCA Bondo/Mar-Hyde Series
Australian Super Speedway Championship	(Australia) Kim Jane	1999–00 Australian Super Speedway Championship
Turismo Carretera	(Argentina) Guillermo Ortelli	2000 Turismo Carretera

== Touring car ==
Series	Driver	Season article
ADAC Procar Series	(Germany) Franz Engstler	2000 ADAC Procar Series
ADAC Procar Series	Teams: (Germany) Bertrand Schäfer Racing	2000 ADAC Procar Series
Asian Touring Car Championship	(Hong Kong) Henry Lee Junior	2000 Asian Touring Car Championship
Asian Touring Car Championship	Teams: (United Kingdom) WK Longman Racing	2000 Asian Touring Car Championship
Australian Saloon Car Series	(Australia) Shane Beikoff	2000 Australian Saloon Car Series
Australian Super Touring Championship	(Australia) Paul Morris	2000 Australian Super Touring Championship
Australian Super Touring Championship	Teams: (Australia) Knight Racing	2000 Australian Super Touring Championship
Australian Super Touring Championship	Independents: (Australia) David Auger	2000 Australian Super Touring Championship
British Touring Car Championship	(Switzerland) Alain Menu	2000 British Touring Car Championship
British Touring Car Championship	Teams: (United Kingdom) Ford Team Mondeo	2000 British Touring Car Championship
British Touring Car Championship	Manufacturers: (United Kingdom) Ford / Ford Team Mondeo	2000 British Touring Car Championship
British Touring Car Championship	Independents: (United Kingdom) Matt Neal	2000 British Touring Car Championship
Danish Touringcar Championship	(Denmark) Michael Carlsen	2000 Danish Touringcar Championship
Deutsche Tourenwagen Masters	(Germany) Bernd Schneider	2000 Deutsche Tourenwagen Masters season
European Super Touring Cup	(Italy) Fabrizio Giovanardi	2000 European Super Touring Cup
European Super Touring Cup	Teams: (Italy) Nordauto Engineering	2000 European Super Touring Cup
Finnish Touring Car Championship	(Finland) Olli Haapalainen	
French Supertouring Championship	(France) William David	
New Zealand Touring Car Championship	(New Zealand) Jason Richards	2000 New Zealand Touring Car Championship
New Zealand V8 Championship	(New Zealand) Mark Pedersen	1999–00 New Zealand V8 season
Renault Sport Clio Trophy	(Italy) Luca Rangoni	2000 Renault Sport Clio Trophy
Renault Sport Clio Trophy	Teams: (Italy) Autotottoli	2000 Renault Sport Clio Trophy
Swedish Touring Car Championship	(Norway) Tommy Rustad	2000 Swedish Touring Car Championship
Swedish Touring Car Championship	Privateers: (Sweden) Magnus Krokström	2000 Swedish Touring Car Championship
Stock Car Brasil	(Brazil) Chico Serra	2000 Stock Car Brasil season
Shell Championship Series (V8 Supercars)	(Australia) Mark Skaife	2000 Shell Championship Series
Shell Championship Series (V8 Supercars)	Teams: (Australia) Holden Racing Team	2000 Shell Championship Series
Shell Championship Series (V8 Supercars)	Manufacturers: (Australia) Holden	2000 Shell Championship Series
Konica V8 Lites Series	(Australia) Dean Canto	2000 Konica V8 Lites Series
TC2000 Championship	(Argentina) Daniel Cingolani	2000 TC2000 Championship

== Truck racing ==
Series	Driver	Season article
European Truck Racing Championship	Super-Race-Trucks: (Finland) Harri Luostarinen	2000 European Truck Racing Championship
European Truck Racing Championship	Race-Trucks: (France) Noël Crozier	2000 European Truck Racing Championship
Fórmula Truck	(Brazil) Jorge Fleck	2000 Fórmula Truck
Fórmula Truck	Teams: (Brazil) Thermoid-Melitta-Volvo	2000 Fórmula Truck

== See also ==
- List of motorsport championships
- Auto racing
