= List of 2001 motorsport champions =

2001 motorsport champions
Previous: 2000	Next: 2002

This list of 2001 motorsport champions is a list of national or international auto racing series with a Championship decided by the points or positions earned by a driver from multiple races.

== Dirt oval racing ==
Series	Champion	Refer
World of Outlaws Sprint Car Series	(United States) Danny Lasoski	
World of Outlaws Sprint Car Series	Teams: (United States) Tony Stewart Racing	

== Drag racing ==
Series	Champion	Refer
NHRA Winston Drag Racing Series	Top Fuel: (United States) Kenny Bernstein	2001 NHRA Winston Drag Racing Series
NHRA Winston Drag Racing Series	Funny Car: (United States) John Force	2001 NHRA Winston Drag Racing Series
NHRA Winston Drag Racing Series	Pro Stock: (United States) Warren Johnson	2001 NHRA Winston Drag Racing Series
NHRA Winston Drag Racing Series	Pro Stock Motorcycle: (United States) Angelle Sampey	2001 NHRA Winston Drag Racing Series

== Drifting ==
Series	Champion	Refer
D1 Grand Prix	(Japan) Nobuteru Taniguchi	2001 D1 Grand Prix season

== Karting ==
Series	Driver	Season article
Karting World Championship	FSA: (Italy) Vitantonio Liuzzi	
CIK-FIA Karting European Championship	FA: (Netherlands) Carlo van Dam	
CIK-FIA Karting European Championship	FC: (Italy) Alessandro Piccini	
CIK-FIA Karting European Championship	ICA: (France) Jean-Philippe Guignet	
CIK-FIA Karting European Championship	ICA-J: (Germany) Sebastian Vettel	
CIK-FIA Karting European Championship	Cadet: (Czech Republic) Erik Janiš	
Rotax Max Challenge	(South Africa) Claudio Piazza-Musso	

== Motorcycle racing ==
Series	Rider	Season article
500cc World Championship	(Italy) Valentino Rossi	2001 Grand Prix motorcycle racing season
250cc World Championship	(Japan) Daijiro Kato	2001 Grand Prix motorcycle racing season
125cc World Championship	(San Marino) Manuel Poggiali	2001 Grand Prix motorcycle racing season
Superbike World Championship	(Australia) Troy Bayliss	2001 Superbike World Championship season
Supersport World Championship	(Australia) Andrew Pitt	
Speedway World Championship	(Sweden) Tony Rickardsson	2001 Speedway Grand Prix
AMA Superbike Championship	(Australia) Mat Mladin	
Australian Superbike Championship	(Australia) Shawn Giles	

== Open wheel racing ==
Series	Driver	Season article
FIA Formula One World Championship	(Germany) Michael Schumacher	2001 Formula One World Championship
FIA Formula One World Championship	Constructors: (Italy) Ferrari	2001 Formula One World Championship
CART FedEx Championship Series	(Brazil) Gil de Ferran	2001 CART season
CART FedEx Championship Series	Manufacturers: (Japan) Honda	2001 CART season
CART FedEx Championship Series	Rookies: (New Zealand) Scott Dixon	2001 CART season
Indy Racing League	(United States) Sam Hornish Jr.	2001 Indy Racing League
Indy Racing League	Manufacturers: (United States) Oldsmobile	2001 Indy Racing League
Indy Racing League	Rookies: (Brazil) Felipe Giaffone	2001 Indy Racing League
Indy Lights	(United States) Townsend Bell	2001 Indy Lights season
Historic Formula One Championship	(United Kingdom) John Bladon	2001 Historic Formula One Championship
Atlantic Championship	(Brazil) Hoover Orsi	2001 Atlantic Championship season
Australian Drivers' Championship	(Australia) Rick Kelly	2001 Australian Drivers' Championship
Barber Dodge Pro Series	(France) Nicolas Rondet	2001 Barber Dodge Pro Series
Euro Formula 3000 Championship	(Brazil) Felipe Massa	2001 Euro Formula 3000 Championship
Formula Chrysler Euroseries	(Netherlands) Ricardo van der Ende	2001 Formula Chrysler Euroseries
Formula Chrysler Euroseries	Teams: (Switzerland) Alpie Motorsport	2001 Formula Chrysler Euroseries
EuroBOSS Series	(United Kingdom) Tony Worswick	2001 EuroBOSS Series
EuroBOSS Series	Teams: (United Kingdom) Worswick Engineering	2001 EuroBOSS Series
Formula Nippon Championship	(Japan) Satoshi Motoyama	2001 Formula Nippon Championship
Formula Nippon Championship	Teams: (Japan) 5ZIGEN	2001 Formula Nippon Championship
International Formula 3000 Championship	(United Kingdom) Justin Wilson	2001 International Formula 3000 Championship
International Formula 3000 Championship	Teams: (United Kingdom) Coca-Cola Nordic Racing	2001 International Formula 3000 Championship
Open Telefonica by Nissan	(France) Franck Montagny	2001 Open Telefonica by Nissan season
Star Mazda Championship	(United States) Scott Bradley	2001 Star Mazda Championship
Formula Palmer Audi	(United Kingdom) Steve Warburton	2001 Formula Palmer Audi
Formula Three
All-Japan Formula Three Championship	(France) Benoît Tréluyer	2001 Japanese Formula 3 Championship
All-Japan Formula Three Championship	Teams: (Japan) TOM'S	2001 Japanese Formula 3 Championship
Asian Formula Three Championship	(Philippines) JoJo Silverio	2001 Asian Formula Three Championship
Asian Formula Three Championship	Teams: (Japan) TOM'S	2001 Asian Formula Three Championship
Australian Formula 3 Championship	(Australia) Peter Hackett	2001 Australian Formula 3 Championship
Australian Formula 3 Championship	Level 2: (Australia) Frank Cascone	2001 Australian Formula 3 Championship
Australian Formula 3 Championship	Level 2 26 mm: (Australia) Peter Rees	2001 Australian Formula 3 Championship
Austria Formula 3 Cup	(Italy) Diego Romanini	2001 Austria Formula 3 Cup
Austria Formula 3 Cup	Trophy: (Italy) Luca lannaccone	2001 Austria Formula 3 Cup
British Formula 3 Championship	(Japan) Takuma Sato	2001 British Formula 3 season
British Formula 3 Championship	National: (United Kingdom) Robbie Kerr	2001 British Formula 3 season
Chilean Formula Three Championship	(Chile) Giuseppe Bacigalupo	2001 Chilean Formula Three Championship
Finnish Formula Three Championship	(Finland) Jari Koivisto	2001 Finnish Formula Three Championship
Finnish Formula Three Championship	Teams: (Finland) Jari Koivisto Racing	2001 Finnish Formula Three Championship
French Formula Three Championship	(Japan) Ryō Fukuda	2001 French Formula Three Championship
French Formula Three Championship	Teams: (France) Saulnier Racing	2001 French Formula Three Championship
French Formula Three Championship	Class B: (France) Philippe Hottinguer	2001 French Formula Three Championship
German Formula Three Championship	(Japan) Toshihiro Kaneishi	2001 German Formula Three Championship
German Formula Three Championship	Rookie: (Germany) Markus Winkelhock	2001 German Formula Three Championship
Italian Formula Three Championship	(Italy) Lorenzo Del Gallo	
Mexican Formula Three Championship	(Mexico) Gilberto Jiménez	2001 Mexican Formula Three Championship
Formula Three Nordic	(Finland) Sanna Pinola	
Russian Formula Three Championship	(Italy) Maurizio Mediani	
Spanish Formula Three Championship	(Spain) Ander Vilariño	2001 Spanish Formula Three season
Spanish Formula Three Championship	Teams: (Spain) Racing Engineering	2001 Spanish Formula Three season
Spanish Formula Three Championship	Copa Rookie: (Spain) Juan Antonio del Pino	2001 Spanish Formula Three season
Formula Three Sudamericana	(Brazil) Juliano Moro	
Formula Three Sudamericana	Light: (Brazil) Daniel Scandian	
Swiss Formula Three Championship	(Switzerland) Jo Zeller	2001 Swiss Formula Three Championship
Swiss Formula Three Championship	Class B: (Switzerland) Jurg Felix	2001 Swiss Formula Three Championship
United States Formula Three Championship	(Brazil) Luciano Gomide	2001 United States Formula Three Championship
United States Formula Three Championship	Teams: (Italy) EuroInternational	2001 United States Formula Three Championship
Formula Renault
Formula Renault 2000 Eurocup	(Brazil) Augusto Farfus	2001 Formula Renault 2000 Eurocup season
Formula Renault 2000 Eurocup	Teams: (Italy) Prema Powerteam	2001 Formula Renault 2000 Eurocup season
Formula Renault 2000 UK	(United Kingdom) Carl Breeze	
Formula Renault 2000 UK	Winter Series: (United Kingdom) Robert Bell	
Championnat de France Formula Renault 2000	(France) Éric Salignon	
Formula Renault BARC	(United Kingdom) Martin Wallbank	
Formula Renault 2000 Italia	(Australia) Ryan Briscoe	
Formula Renault 2000 Italia	Teams: (Italy) Prema Powerteam	
Formula Renault 2000 Italia	Winter Series: (Brazil) Roberto Streit	
Formula Renault 2000 Germany	(Germany) Marcel Lasée	
Formula Campus by Renault and Elf	(France) Bruce Lorgere-Roux	
Formula Renault 1.6 Argentina	(Argentina) Rafael Morgenstern	
Formula BMW
Formula BMW ADAC	(Germany) Timo Glock	
Formula BMW ADAC	Teams: (Germany) BMW Rookie Team	
F. Baviera Junior Cup	(Portugal) Filipe Figueiredo e Silva	
Formula Ford
Australian Formula Ford Championship	(Australia) Will Davison	2001 Australian Formula Ford Championship
Benelux Formula Ford Championship	(Netherlands) Jaap van Lagen	2001 Benelux Formula Ford Championship
British Formula Ford Championship	(Sweden) Robert Dahlgren	2001 British Formula Ford Championship
Dutch Formula Ford Championship	(Netherlands) Stefan de Groot	2001 Dutch Formula Ford Championship
Formula Ford Zetec Championship Series	(United States) Jason Lapoint	2001 Formula Ford Zetec Championship Series
European Formula Ford Championship	(Sweden) Richard Göransson	2001 European Formula Ford Championship
New Zealand Formula Ford Championship	(New Zealand) James Cressey	2000–01 New Zealand Formula Ford Championship
Other junior formulae
United States Speedway Series	(United States) Ken Petrie	2001 United States Speedway Series
Barber Dodge Pro Series	(France) Nicolas Rondet	2001 Barber Dodge Pro Series
Formula Volkswagen Germany	(Austria) Walter Lechner Jr.	2001 Formula Volkswagen Germany season
Formula Asia	(India) Karun Chandhok	2001 Formula Asia
Formula Dream	(Japan) Shinya Hosokawa	2001 Formula Dream
JAF Japan Formula 4	Kantō: (Japan) Naohiro Kawano	2001 JAF Japan Formula 4
JAF Japan Formula 4	Kansai: (Japan) Kenji Kanehisa	2001 JAF Japan Formula 4
Formula Dodge National Championship	(Brazil) Júlio Campos	
Formula Dodge National Championship	Masters: (United States) Roland Isra	
Formula Dodge Eastern Championship	(Venezuela) E. J. Viso	
Formula Dodge Eastern Championship	Masters: (United States) Mark Patterson	
Formula Dodge Midwestern Championship	(United States) Chris Baker	
Formula Dodge Midwestern Championship	Masters: (United States) Roland Isra	
Formula Dodge Southern Championship	(United States) Craig Duerson	
Formula Dodge Southern Championship	Masters: (United States) Bud Risser	
Formula Dodge Western Championship	(Brazil) Leonardo Maia	
Formula Dodge Western Championship	Masters: (United States) Peter Ponder-Pistor	
Formula König	(Germany) Thomas Westarp	2001 Formula König season
Formula König	Teams: (Germany) Kern Motorsport	2001 Formula König season
Formula Lista Junior	(Switzerland) Ken Allemann	2001 Formula Lista Junior season
Formula Toyota	(Japan) Naoki Yokomizo	2001 Formula Toyota season
Russian Formula 1600 Championship	(Russia) Dmitriy Shcheglov	2001 Russian Formula 1600 Championship
Russian Formula 1600 Championship	Teams: (Russia) LogoVAZ-Belyaevo	2001 Russian Formula 1600 Championship

== Rallying ==
Series	Driver/Co-Driver	Season article
World Rally Championship	(United Kingdom) Richard Burns	2001 World Rally Championship
World Rally Championship	Co-Drivers: (United Kingdom) Robert Reid	2001 World Rally Championship
World Rally Championship	Manufacturers: (France) Peugeot	2001 World Rally Championship
Junior World Rally Championship	(France) Sébastien Loeb	2001 World Rally Championship
FIA Cup for Production Cars	(Argentina) Gabriel Pozzo	2001 World Rally Championship
African Rally Championship	(South Africa) Schalk Burger	2001 African Rally Championship
Asia-Pacific Rally Championship	(Malaysia) Karamjit Singh	2001 Asia-Pacific Rally Championship
Asia-Pacific Rally Championship	Co-Drivers: (Malaysia) Allen Oh	2001 Asia-Pacific Rally Championship
Australian Rally Championship	(New Zealand) Possum Bourne	2001 Australian Rally Championship
Australian Rally Championship	Co-Drivers: (Australia) Craig Vincent	2001 Australian Rally Championship
Canadian Rally Championship	(Canada) Tom McGeer	2001 Canadian Rally Championship
Canadian Rally Championship	Co-Drivers: (Canada) Mark Williams	2001 Canadian Rally Championship
Czech Rally Championship	(Czech Republic) Roman Kresta	2001 Czech Rally Championship
Czech Rally Championship	Co-Drivers: (Czech Republic) Jan Tománek	2001 Czech Rally Championship
Deutsche Rallye Meisterschaft	(Germany) Matthias Kahle	
Estonian Rally Championship	A>2000: (Estonia) Margus Murakas	2001 Estonian Rally Championship
Estonian Rally Championship	A>2000 Co-Drivers: (Estonia) Toomas Kitsing	2001 Estonian Rally Championship
Estonian Rally Championship	N 2000+: (Estonia) Urmo Aava	2001 Estonian Rally Championship
Estonian Rally Championship	N 2000+ Co-Drivers: (Estonia) Peeter Poom	2001 Estonian Rally Championship
European Rally Championship	(Germany) Armin Kremer	2001 European Rally Championship
European Rally Championship	Co-Drivers: (Germany) Fred Berssen	2001 European Rally Championship
Finnish Rally Championship	Group A +2000cc: (Finland) Janne Tuohino	2001 Finnish Rally Championship
Finnish Rally Championship	Group N +2000cc: (Finland) Jouko Puhakka	2001 Finnish Rally Championship
Finnish Rally Championship	Group A -2000cc: (Finland) Tomi Tukiainen	2001 Finnish Rally Championship
Finnish Rally Championship	Group N -2000cc: (Finland) Kosti Katajamäki	2001 Finnish Rally Championship
French Rally Championship	(France) Sébastien Loeb	
Hungarian Rally Championship	(Hungary) János Tóth	
Hungarian Rally Championship	Co-Drivers: (Hungary) Imre Tóth	
Indian National Rally Championship	(India) N. Leelakrishnan	
Indian National Rally Championship	Co-Drivers: (India) Farooq Ahmed	
Italian Rally Championship	(Italy) Paolo Andreucci	
Italian Rally Championship	Co-Drivers: (Italy) Alessandro Giusti	
Italian Rally Championship	Manufacturers: (United States) Ford	
Middle East Rally Championship	(United Arab Emirates) Mohammed Ben Sulayem	
New Zealand Rally Championship	(New Zealand) Bruce Herbert	2001 New Zealand Rally Championship
New Zealand Rally Championship	Co-Drivers: (New Zealand) Rob Ryan	2001 New Zealand Rally Championship
Polish Rally Championship	(Poland) Janusz Kulig	
Romanian Rally Championship	(Romania) Constantin Aur	
Slovak Rally Championship	(Poland) Janusz Kulig	
Slovak Rally Championship	Co-Drivers: (Slovakia) Emil Horniaček	
South African National Rally Championship	(South Africa) Jannie Habig	
South African National Rally Championship	Co-Drivers: (South Africa) Douglas Judd	
South African National Rally Championship	Manufacturers: (Japan) Toyota	
Spanish Rally Championship	(Spain) Luis Monzón	
Spanish Rally Championship	Co-Drivers: (Spain) José Deniz	

=== Rallycross ===
Series	Driver	Season article
FIA European Rallycross Championship	Div 1: (Sweden) Kenneth Hansen	
FIA European Rallycross Championship	Div 2: (Belgium) Ronny Scheveneels	
FIA European Rallycross Championship	1400 Cup: (Germany) Sven Seeliger	
British Rallycross Championship	(Republic of Ireland) Dermot Carnegie	

== Sports car ==
Series	Driver	Season article
All Japan Grand Touring Car Championship	(Japan) Hironori Takeuchi (Japan) Yuji Tachikawa	2001 All Japan Grand Touring Car Championship
All Japan Grand Touring Car Championship	GT300: (Japan) Takayuki Aoki; GT300: (Japan) Noboyuki Oyagi	2001 All Japan Grand Touring Car Championship
American Le Mans Series	LMP900: (Italy) Emanuele Pirro	2001 American Le Mans Series season
American Le Mans Series	LMP675: (Belgium) Didier de Radiguès	2001 American Le Mans Series season
American Le Mans Series	GTS: (United States) Terry Borcheller	2001 American Le Mans Series season
American Le Mans Series	GT: (Germany) Jörg Müller	2001 American Le Mans Series season
British GT Championship	GT: (United Kingdom) David Warnock; GT: (United Kingdom) Mike Jordan	2001 British GT Championship
British GT Championship	GTO: (United Kingdom) Kelvin Burt; GTO: (United Kingdom) Marino Franchitti	2001 British GT Championship
Grand American Road Racing Championship	SRP: (United Kingdom) James Weaver	2001 Grand American Road Racing Championship season
Grand American Road Racing Championship	SRPII: (United States) Andy Lally	2001 Grand American Road Racing Championship season
Grand American Road Racing Championship	GTS: (United States) Chris Bingham	2001 Grand American Road Racing Championship season
Grand American Road Racing Championship	GT: (United States) Darren Law	2001 Grand American Road Racing Championship season
Grand American Road Racing Championship	AGT: (United States) Craig Conway	2001 Grand American Road Racing Championship season
FIA Sportscar Championship	SR1: (Italy) Marco Zadra	2001 FIA Sportscar Championship season
FIA Sportscar Championship	SR1 Teams: (Italy) BMS Scuderia Italia	2001 FIA Sportscar Championship season
FIA Sportscar Championship	SR2: (United States) Larry Oberto; SR2: (Sweden) Thed Björk	2001 FIA Sportscar Championship season
FIA Sportscar Championship	SR2 Teams: SportsRacing Team Sweden	2001 FIA Sportscar Championship season
FIA GT Championship	GT: (France) Christophe Bouchut; GT: (France) Jean-Philippe Belloc	2001 FIA GT Championship season
FIA GT Championship	GT Teams: (France) Larbre Compétition	2001 FIA GT Championship season
FIA GT Championship	N-GT: (Italy) Christian Pescatori; N-GT: (France) David Terrien	2001 FIA GT Championship season
FIA GT Championship	N-GT Teams: (France) JMB Compétition	2001 FIA GT Championship season
Trans-Am Series	(United States) Paul Gentilozzi	2001 Trans-Am Series
Trans-Am Series	Owners: (United States) Rocketsports #64	2001 Trans-Am Series
Trans-Am Series	Manufacturers: (United Kingdom) Jaguar	2001 Trans-Am Series
Porsche Supercup, Porsche Carrera Cup, GT3 Cup Challenge and Porsche Sprint Challenge
Porsche Supercup	(Germany) Jörg Bergmeister	2001 Porsche Supercup
Porsche Supercup	Teams: (Germany) Farnbacher Racing	2001 Porsche Supercup
Porsche Carrera Cup France	(France) Philippe Gache	2001 Porsche Carrera Cup France
Porsche Carrera Cup France	Teams: (France) SMG	2001 Porsche Carrera Cup France
Porsche Carrera Cup Germany	(Germany) Timo Bernhard	2001 Porsche Carrera Cup Germany
Porsche Carrera Cup Germany	Teams: (Germany) UPS Porsche Junior Team	2001 Porsche Carrera Cup Germany
Porsche Carrera Cup Japan	(Japan) Yasuo Miyakawa	2001 Porsche Carrera Cup Japan

== Stock car racing ==
Series	Driver	Season article
NASCAR Winston Cup Series	(United States) Jeff Gordon	2001 NASCAR Winston Cup Series
NASCAR Winston Cup Series	Manufacturers: (United States) Chevrolet	2001 NASCAR Winston Cup Series
NASCAR Busch Grand National Series	(United States) Kevin Harvick	2001 NASCAR Busch Series
NASCAR Busch Grand National Series	Manufacturers: (United States) Chevrolet	2001 NASCAR Busch Series
NASCAR Craftsman Truck Series	(United States) Greg Biffle	2000 NASCAR Craftsman Truck Series
NASCAR Craftsman Truck Series	Manufacturers: (United States) Dodge	2000 NASCAR Craftsman Truck Series
NASCAR Busch North Series	(United States) Mike Olsen	2001 NASCAR Busch North Series
NASCAR Winston West Series	(United States) Brendan Gaughan	2001 NASCAR Winston West Series
ARCA Re/Max Series	(United States) Frank Kimmel	2001 ARCA Re/Max Series
ASCAR Racing Series	(United Kingdom) John Mickel	2001 ASCAR season
Australian Super Speedway Championship	(Australia) Andrew Miedecke	2001 Australian Super Speedway Championship
Turismo Carretera	(Argentina) Guillermo Ortelli	2001 Turismo Carretera

== Touring car ==
Series	Driver	Season article
ADAC Procar Series	(Germany) Markus Gedlich	2001 ADAC Procar Series
ADAC Procar Series	Teams: (Germany) Schubert Motors	2001 ADAC Procar Series
Asian Touring Car Championship	(Thailand) Nattavude Charoensukhawatana	2001 Asian Touring Car Championship
Asian Touring Car Championship	Teams: (United Kingdom) WK Longman Racing	2001 Asian Touring Car Championship
Australian Saloon Car Series	(Australia) Tony Evangelou	2001 Australian Saloon Car Series
Australian Super Touring Series	(Australia) Peter Hills	2001 Australian Super Touring Series
Australian Super Touring Series	Teams: (Australia) Knight Racing	2001 Australian Super Touring Series
British Touring Car Championship	(United Kingdom) Jason Plato	2001 British Touring Car Championship
British Touring Car Championship	Teams: (United Kingdom) Vauxhall Motorsport	2001 British Touring Car Championship
British Touring Car Championship	Manufacturers: (United Kingdom) Vauxhall	2001 British Touring Car Championship
British Touring Car Championship	Production: (United Kingdom) Simon Harrison	2001 British Touring Car Championship
British Touring Car Championship	Production Teams: (United Kingdom) GR Motorsport	2001 British Touring Car Championship
Danish Touringcar Championship	(Denmark) Michael Carlsen	2001 Danish Touringcar Championship
Deutsche Tourenwagen Masters	(Germany) Bernd Schneider	2001 Deutsche Tourenwagen Masters season
Deutsche Tourenwagen Masters	Teams: (Germany) D2 AMG Mercedes	2001 Deutsche Tourenwagen Masters season
European Super Touring Championship	(Italy) Fabrizio Giovanardi	2001 European Touring Car Championship
European Super Touring Championship	Teams: (Italy) Nordauto Engineering	2001 European Touring Car Championship
European Super Touring Championship	Amateur: (Italy) Sandro Sardelli	2001 European Touring Car Championship
European Super Production Championship	(Netherlands) Peter Kox	2001 European Super Production Championship
Finnish Touring Car Championship	(Finland) Olli Haapalainen	
French Supertouring Championship	(France) Jean-Philippe Dayraut	
Italian Super Production Championship	(Italy) Fabio Francia	
New Zealand Touring Car Championship	(New Zealand) Jason Richards	2001 New Zealand Touring Car Championship
New Zealand V8 Championship	(New Zealand) Paul Manuell	2000–01 New Zealand V8 season
Renault Sport Clio Trophy	(Italy) Luca Rangoni	2001 Renault Sport Clio Trophy
Renault Sport Clio Trophy	Teams: (Italy) Autotottoli	2001 Renault Sport Clio Trophy
Stock Car Brasil	(Brazil) Chico Serra	2001 Stock Car Brasil season
Shell Championship Series (V8 Supercars)	(Australia) Mark Skaife	2001 Shell Championship Series
Shell Championship Series (V8 Supercars)	Teams: (Australia) Holden Racing Team	2001 Shell Championship Series
Shell Championship Series (V8 Supercars)	Manufacturers: (Australia) Holden	2001 Shell Championship Series
Konica V8 Supercar Series	(New Zealand) Simon Wills	2001 Konica V8 Supercar Series
Swedish Touring Car Championship	(Italy) Roberto Colciago	2001 Swedish Touring Car Championship
Swedish Touring Car Championship	Independents: (Sweden) Tobias Johansson	2001 Swedish Touring Car Championship
Swedish Touring Car Championship	Manufacturers: (Germany) Audi	2001 Swedish Touring Car Championship
TC2000 Championship	(Argentina) Gabriel Ponce de León	2001 TC2000 Championship
V8Star Series	(Venezuela) Johnny Cecotto	2001 V8Star Series
V8Star Series	Teams: (France) PoleVision Racing	2001 V8Star Series

== Truck racing ==
Series	Driver	Season article
European Truck Racing Championship	Super-Race-Trucks: (Germany) Fritz Kreutzpointner	2001 European Truck Racing Championship
European Truck Racing Championship	Super-Race-Trucks B: (Czech Republic) Stan Matějovský	2001 European Truck Racing Championship
European Truck Racing Championship	Race-Trucks: (Germany) Lutz Bernau	2001 European Truck Racing Championship
Fórmula Truck	(Brazil) Wellington Cirino	2001 Fórmula Truck
Fórmula Truck	Teams: (Brazil) ABF Mercedes-Benz	2001 Fórmula Truck
V8 BRute Series	(Australia) Rod Wilson	2001 V8 BRute Series

== See also ==
- List of motorsport championships
- Auto racing
