= List of 2002 motorsport champions =

2002 motorsport champions
Previous: 2001	Next: 2003

This list of 2002 motorsport champions is a list of national or international auto racing series with a Championship decided by the points or positions earned by a driver from multiple races.

== Dirt oval racing ==
Series	Champion	Refer
World of Outlaws Sprint Car Series	(United States) Steve Kinser	
World of Outlaws Sprint Car Series	Teams: (United States) Steve Kinser Racing	

== Drag racing ==
Series	Champion	Refer
NHRA Powerade Drag Racing Series	Top Fuel: (United States) Larry Dixon	2002 NHRA Powerade Drag Racing Series
NHRA Powerade Drag Racing Series	Funny Car: (United States) John Force	2002 NHRA Powerade Drag Racing Series
NHRA Powerade Drag Racing Series	Pro Stock: (United States) Jeg Coughlin Jr.	2002 NHRA Powerade Drag Racing Series
NHRA Powerade Drag Racing Series	Pro Stock Motorcycle: (United States) Angelle Sampey	2002 NHRA Powerade Drag Racing Series

== Drifting ==
Series	Champion	Refer
D1 Grand Prix	(Japan) Katsuhiro Ueo	2002 D1 Grand Prix season
D1UK/Autoglym Drift Championship	(United Kingdom) James Wolstenholme	2002 D1UK/Autoglym Drift Championship

== Karting ==
Series	Driver	Season article
Karting World Championship	FSA: (Netherlands) Giedo van der Garde	
CIK-FIA Karting European Championship	FA: (Germany) David Hemkemeyer	
CIK-FIA Karting European Championship	S-ICC: (Italy) Francesco Laudato; S-ICC: (Italy) Sauro Cesetti	
CIK-FIA Karting European Championship	ICA: (Belgium) Jonathan Thonon	
CIK-FIA Karting European Championship	ICA-J: (Switzerland) Sébastien Buemi	
Rotax Max Challenge	(South Africa) Mark Cronje	

== Motorcycle ==
Series	Rider	Season article
MotoGP World Championship	(Italy) Valentino Rossi	2002 Grand Prix motorcycle racing season
250cc World Championship	(Italy) Marco Melandri	2002 Grand Prix motorcycle racing season
125cc World Championship	(France) Arnaud Vincent	2002 Grand Prix motorcycle racing season
Superbike World Championship	(United States) Colin Edwards	2002 Superbike World Championship season
Supersport World Championship	(France) Fabien Foret	
Speedway World Championship	(Sweden) Tony Rickardsson	2002 Speedway Grand Prix
AMA Superbike Championship	(United States) Nicky Hayden	
Australian Superbike Championship	(Australia) Shawn Giles	

== Open wheel racing ==
Series	Driver	Season article
FIA Formula One World Championship	(Germany) Michael Schumacher	2002 Formula One World Championship
FIA Formula One World Championship	Constructors: (Italy) Ferrari	2002 Formula One World Championship
CART FedEx Championship Series	(Brazil) Cristiano da Matta	2002 CART season
CART FedEx Championship Series	Manufacturers: (Japan) Toyota	2002 CART season
CART FedEx Championship Series	Rookies: (Mexico) Mario Domínguez	2002 CART season
Indy Racing League	(United States) Sam Hornish Jr.	2002 Indy Racing League
Indy Racing League	Manufacturers: (United States) Chevrolet	2002 Indy Racing League
Indy Racing League	Rookies: (France) Laurent Rédon	2002 Indy Racing League
Infiniti Pro Series	(United States) A. J. Foyt IV	2002 Infiniti Pro Series season
Historic Formula One Championship	(United Kingdom) Mike Whatley	2002 Historic Formula One Championship
American Indycar Series	(United States) Eddie Nahir	2002 American Indycar Series
United States Speedway Series	(United States) Ken Petrie	2002 United States Speedway Series
Atlantic Championship	(United States) Jon Fogarty	2002 Atlantic Championship season
Australian Drivers' Championship	(Australia) Will Power	2002 Australian Drivers' Championship
Barber Dodge Pro Series	(United States) A. J. Allmendinger	2002 Barber Dodge Pro Series
Euro Formula 3000 Championship	(Brazil) Jaime Melo	2002 Euro Formula 3000 Championship
Formula Nippon Championship	(Republic of Ireland) Ralph Firman	2002 Formula Nippon Championship
Formula Nippon Championship	Teams: (Japan) Nakajima Racing	2002 Formula Nippon Championship
Formula Volkswagen Germany	(Germany) Sven Barth	2002 Formula Volkswagen Germany season
International Formula 3000 Championship	(France) Sébastien Bourdais	2002 International Formula 3000 Championship
International Formula 3000 Championship	Teams: (United Kingdom) Arden International	2002 International Formula 3000 Championship
EuroBOSS Series	(South Africa) Earl Goddard	2002 EuroBOSS Series
EuroBOSS Series	Teams: (United Kingdom) Kockney Koi Yamitsu	2002 EuroBOSS Series
Formula Asia	(Singapore) Denis Lian	2002 Formula Asia
Formula Dream	(Japan) Yuki Shibata	2002 Formula Dream
JAF Japan Formula 4	Kantō: (Japan) Tetsuya Fujisawa	2002 JAF Japan Formula 4
JAF Japan Formula 4	Kansai: (Japan) Katsumasa Katayose	2002 JAF Japan Formula 4
World Series by Nissan	(Brazil) Ricardo Zonta	2002 World Series by Nissan season
Formula Nissan 2000	(Spain) Santiago Porteiro	2002 Formula Nissan 2000 season
Formula Palmer Audi	(United Kingdom) Adrian Willmott	2002 Formula Palmer Audi
Formula Palmer Audi	Autumn Trophy: (United Kingdom) Ben Lewis	2002 Formula Palmer Audi
Formula König	(Germany) Jochen Nerpel	2002 Formula König season
Formula König	Teams: (Germany) RS Racing Team	2002 Formula König season
Formula Toyota	(Japan) Wataru Kobayakawa	2002 Formula Toyota season
Formula Dodge National Championship	(United States) Grant Maiman	
Formula Dodge National Championship	Masters: (United States) Roland Isra	
Formula Dodge Eastern Championship	(United States) Abraham Zimroth	
Formula Dodge Eastern Championship	Masters: (United States) Chris Oliver	
Formula Dodge Midwestern Championship	(Mexico) Luis Pelayo	
Formula Dodge Midwestern Championship	Masters: (United States) John Greist	
Formula Dodge Southern Championship	(United States) Matt Franc	
Formula Dodge Southern Championship	Masters: (United States) Peter Stolper	
Formula Dodge Western Championship	(United States) Robbie Montinola	
Formula Dodge Western Championship	Masters: (Mexico) Jose Guzman	
Skip Barber Challenge	(United States) Matt Franc	
Formula Lista Junior	(Poland) Damian Sawicki	2002 Formula Lista Junior season
Formula RUS	(Russia) Roman Shestakov	
Russian Formula 1600 Championship	(Russia) Viktor Shaytar	2002 Russian Formula 1600 Championship
Russian Formula 1600 Championship	Teams: (Russia) Formula Z	2002 Russian Formula 1600 Championship
Star Mazda Championship	(United States) Guy Cosmo	2002 Star Mazda Championship
Formula Three
Asian Formula Three Championship	(United Kingdom) Mark Goddard	2002 Asian Formula Three Championship
Asian Formula Three Championship	Teams: (United Kingdom) Team Goddard	2002 Asian Formula Three Championship
Australian Formula 3 Championship	(Australia) James Manderson	2002 Australian Formula 3 Championship
Australian Formula 3 Championship	National Class: (Australia) Paul Trengove	2002 Australian Formula 3 Championship
Australian Formula 3 Championship	Copa Rookie: (Spain) Andy Soucek	2002 Australian Formula 3 Championship
Austria Formula 3 Cup	(Austria) Hannes Neuhauser	2002 Austria Formula 3 Cup
Austria Formula 3 Cup	Trophy: (Austria) Hannes Neuhauser	2002 Austria Formula 3 Cup
British Formula 3 Championship	(United Kingdom) Robbie Kerr	2002 British Formula Three Championship
British Formula 3 Championship	National: (United Kingdom) Adam Carroll	2002 British Formula Three Championship
All-Japan Formula Three Championship	(Japan) Takashi Kogure	2002 Japanese Formula 3 Championship
All-Japan Formula Three Championship	Teams: (Japan) Dome Racing Team	2002 Japanese Formula 3 Championship
Chilean Formula Three Championship	(Chile) Giuseppe Bacigalupo	2002 Chilean Formula Three Championship
French Formula Three Championship	(France) Tristan Gommendy	2002 French Formula Three Championship
French Formula Three Championship	Teams: (France) ASM Formule 3	2002 French Formula Three Championship
French Formula Three Championship	Class B: (France) Benjamin Poron	2002 French Formula Three Championship
German Formula Three Championship	(United Kingdom) Gary Paffett	2002 German Formula Three Championship
German Formula Three Championship	Rookie: (Germany) Timo Glock	2002 German Formula Three Championship
Finnish Formula Three Championship	(Finland) Jussi Pinomäki	2002 Finnish Formula Three Championship
Finnish Formula Three Championship	Teams: (Finland) Niinivirta Motorsport	2002 Finnish Formula Three Championship
Italian Formula Three Championship	(Serbia and Montenegro) Miloš Pavlović	2002 Italian Formula Three season
Italian Formula Three Championship	Trofeo: (Italy) Carmine Tancredi	2002 Italian Formula Three season
Mexican Formula Three Championship	(Mexico) Guillermo Zapata	2002 Mexican Formula Three Championship
Russian Formula Three Championship	(Italy) Andrea Belicchi	
Spanish Formula Three Championship	(Spain) Marcel Costa	2002 Spanish Formula Three season
Spanish Formula Three Championship	Teams: (Spain) Racing Engineering	2002 Spanish Formula Three season
Swiss Formula Three Championship	(Switzerland) Jo Zeller	2002 Swiss Formula Three Championship
Swiss Formula Three Championship	Class B: (Switzerland) Bruno Huber	2002 Swiss Formula Three Championship
Formula Three Sudamericana	(Brazil) Nelson Piquet Jr.	
Formula Three Sudamericana	Light: (Brazil) Eduardo Azevedo	
Formula Renault
Formula Renault 2000 Eurocup	(France) Eric Salignon	2002 Formula Renault 2000 Eurocup season
Formula Renault 2000 Eurocup	Teams: (France) Graff Racing	2002 Formula Renault 2000 Eurocup season
Formula Renault 2000 UK	(United Kingdom) Danny Watts	2002 Formula Renault 2000 UK season
Formula Renault 2000 UK	Winter Series: (United Kingdom) Robert Bell	2002 Formula Renault 2000 UK season
Championnat de France FFSA de Formule Renault	(France) Alexandre Prémat	
Formula Renault BARC	(United Kingdom) Jeremy Smith	
Formula Renault 2000 Italia	(Argentina) José María López	
Formula Renault 2000 Italia	Teams: (Italy) Cram Competition	
Formula Renault 2000 Italia	Winter Series: (Finland) Toni Vilander	
Formula Renault 2000 Germany	(Austria) Christian Klien	
Formula Renault 2000 Scandinavia	(Denmark) Philip Andersen	2002 Formula Renault 2000 Scandinavia season
Renault Speed Trophy F2000	(Germany) Thomas Conrad	
Mexican Formula Renault Championship	(Mexico) David Martínez	
Formula Renault 2000 Brazil	(Brazil) Sérgio Jimenez	
Formula Campus by Renault and Elf	(France) Loïc Duval	
North American Fran Am 2000 Pro Championship	(Canada) Bruno Spengler	
Asian Formula Renault Challenge	(China) Cheng Congfu	
Asian Formula Renault Challenge	Teams: (China) FRD Team	
Formula Renault 1600 Argentina	(Argentina) Rafael Morgenstern	
Formula Junior 1600 Italia powered by Renault	(Italy) Barbieri	
Formula Junior 1600 Spain	(Spain) Adrián Vallés	
North American Fran Am 1600 Pro Championship	(United States) Tim Barber	
Formula Super Renault	(Argentina) Matías Rossi	
Formula BMW
Formula BMW ADAC	(Finland) Nico Rosberg	2002 Formula BMW ADAC season
Formula BMW ADAC	Teams: (Germany) VIVA Racing/Team Rosberg	2002 Formula BMW ADAC season
F. Baviera Junior Cup	(Portugal) Nuno Pinto	
Formula Ford
Australian Formula Ford Championship	(Australia) Jamie Whincup	2002 Australian Formula Ford Championship
Benelux Formula Ford Championship	(Netherlands) Jaap van Lagen	2002 Benelux Formula Ford Championship
British Formula Ford Championship	(United Kingdom) Westley Barber	2002 British Formula Ford Championship
Dutch Formula Ford Championship	(Netherlands) Jaap van Lagen	2002 Dutch Formula Ford Championship
Formula Ford Zetec Championship Series	(United States) Bryan Sellers	2002 Formula Ford Zetec Championship Series
New Zealand Formula Ford Championship	(New Zealand) Fabian Coulthard	2001–02 New Zealand Formula Ford Championship

== Rallying ==
Series	Driver/Co-Driver	Season article
World Rally Championship	(Finland) Marcus Grönholm	2002 World Rally Championship
World Rally Championship	Co-Drivers: (Finland) Timo Rautiainen	2002 World Rally Championship
World Rally Championship	Manufacturer: (France) Peugeot	2002 World Rally Championship
Junior World Rally Championship	(Spain) Daniel Solà	2002 World Rally Championship
Production World Rally Championship	(Malaysia) Karamjit Singh	2002 World Rally Championship
African Rally Championship	(South Africa) John Gemmel	2002 African Rally Championship
Asia-Pacific Rally Championship	(Malaysia) Karamjit Singh	2002 Asia-Pacific Rally Championship
Asia-Pacific Rally Championship	Co-Drivers: (Malaysia) Allen Oh	2002 Asia-Pacific Rally Championship
Australian Rally Championship	(New Zealand) Possum Bourne	2002 Australian Rally Championship
Australian Rally Championship	Co-Drivers: (Australia) Mark Stacey	2002 Australian Rally Championship
British Rally Championship	(United Kingdom) Jonny Milner	2002 British Rally Championship
British Rally Championship	Co-Drivers: (United Kingdom) Nicky Beech	2002 British Rally Championship
Canadian Rally Championship	(Canada) Patrick Richard	2002 Canadian Rally Championship
Canadian Rally Championship	Co-Drivers: (Canada) Ian McCurdy	2002 Canadian Rally Championship
Czech Rally Championship	(Czech Republic) Václav Pech	2002 Czech Rally Championship
Czech Rally Championship	Co-Drivers: (Czech Republic) Petr Uhel	2002 Czech Rally Championship
Deutsche Rallye Meisterschaft	(Germany) Matthias Kahle	
Estonian Rally Championship	A>2000: (Estonia) Margus Murakas	2002 Estonian Rally Championship
Estonian Rally Championship	A>2000 Co-Drivers: (Estonia) Toomas Kitsing	2002 Estonian Rally Championship
Estonian Rally Championship	N 2000+: (Estonia) Mait Meriloo	2002 Estonian Rally Championship
Estonian Rally Championship	N 2000+ Co-Drivers: (Estonia) Peep Kallaste; N 2000+ Co-Drivers: (Estonia) Meelis Pihel	2002 Estonian Rally Championship
European Rally Championship	(Italy) Renato Travaglia	2002 European Rally Championship
European Rally Championship	Co-Drivers: (Italy) Flavio Zanella	2002 European Rally Championship
Finnish Rally Championship	Group A +2000cc: (Finland) Sebastian Lindholm	2002 Finnish Rally Championship
Finnish Rally Championship	Group N +2000cc: (Finland) Juha Salo	2002 Finnish Rally Championship
Finnish Rally Championship	Group A -2000cc: (Finland) Mikko Hirvonen	2002 Finnish Rally Championship
Finnish Rally Championship	Group N -2000cc: (Finland) Eero Räikkönen	2002 Finnish Rally Championship
French Rally Championship	(France) Benoît Rousselot	
Hungarian Rally Championship	(Hungary) János Tóth	
Hungarian Rally Championship	Co-Drivers: (Hungary) Imre Tóth	
Indian National Rally Championship	(India) V. R. Naren Kumar	
Indian National Rally Championship	Co-Drivers: (India) D. Ram Kumar	
Italian Rally Championship	(Italy) Renato Travaglia	
Italian Rally Championship	Co-Drivers: (Italy) Flavio Zanella	
Italian Rally Championship	Manufacturers: (France) Peugeot	
Middle East Rally Championship	(United Arab Emirates) Mohammed Ben Sulayem	
New Zealand Rally Championship	(New Zealand) Bruce Herbert	2002 New Zealand Rally Championship
New Zealand Rally Championship	Co-Drivers: (New Zealand) Rob Ryan	2002 New Zealand Rally Championship
Polish Rally Championship	(Poland) Leszek Kuzaj	
Romanian Rally Championship	(Romania) Constantin Aur	
Scottish Rally Championship	(United Kingdom) Barry Johnson	
Scottish Rally Championship	Co-Drivers: (United Kingdom) Gordon Adam	
Slovak Rally Championship	(Czech Republic) Václav Pech	
Slovak Rally Championship	Co-Drivers: (Czech Republic) Petr Uhel	
South African National Rally Championship	(South Africa) Jannie Habig	
South African National Rally Championship	Co-Drivers: (South Africa) Douglas Judd	
South African National Rally Championship	Manufacturers: (Japan) Toyota	
Spanish Rally Championship	(Spain) Jesús Puras	
Spanish Rally Championship	Co-Drivers: (Spain) Carlos del Barrio	

=== Rallycross ===
Series	Driver	Season article
FIA European Rallycross Championship	Div 1: (Sweden) Kenneth Hansen	
FIA European Rallycross Championship	Div 2: (Netherlands) Marc-Jan Vlassak	
FIA European Rallycross Championship	1400 Cup: (Czech Republic) Aleš Zázvorka	
British Rallycross Championship	(United Kingdom) Pat Doran	

== Sports car ==
Series	Driver	Season article
American Le Mans Series	LMP900: (Denmark) Tom Kristensen	2002 American Le Mans Series season
American Le Mans Series	LMP675: (United States) Jon Field	2002 American Le Mans Series season
American Le Mans Series	GTS: (Canada) Ron Fellows	2002 American Le Mans Series season
American Le Mans Series	GT: (Germany) Lucas Luhr; GT: (Germany) Sascha Maassen	2002 American Le Mans Series season
British GT Championship	GT: (United Kingdom) Ian McKellar; GT: (Brazil) Thomas Erdos	2002 British GT Championship
British GT Championship	GTO: (United Kingdom) Jamie Davies	2002 British GT Championship
FIA GT Championship	GT: (France) Christophe Bouchut	2002 FIA GT Championship season
FIA GT Championship	GT Teams: (France) Larbre Compétition	2002 FIA GT Championship season
FIA GT Championship	N-GT: (France) Stéphane Ortelli	2002 FIA GT Championship season
FIA GT Championship	N-GT Teams: (Germany) Freisinger Motorsport	2002 FIA GT Championship season
FIA Sportscar Championship	SR1: (Netherlands) Jan Lammers; SR1: (Netherlands) Val Hillebrand	2002 FIA Sportscar Championship season
FIA Sportscar Championship	SR1 Teams: (Netherlands) Racing for Holland	2002 FIA Sportscar Championship season
FIA Sportscar Championship	SR2: (Italy) Mirko Savoldi; SR2: (Italy) Piergiuseppe Peroni	2002 FIA Sportscar Championship season
FIA Sportscar Championship	SR2 Teams: (Italy) Lucchini Engineering	2002 FIA Sportscar Championship season
Rolex Sports Car Series	SRP: (Belgium) Didier Theys	2002 Rolex Sports Car Series season
Rolex Sports Car Series	SRPII: (United States) Terry Borcheller	2002 Rolex Sports Car Series season
Rolex Sports Car Series	GTS: (United States) Chris Bingham	2002 Rolex Sports Car Series season
Rolex Sports Car Series	GT: (United States) Bill Auberlen; GT: (United States) Cort Wagner	2002 Rolex Sports Car Series season
Rolex Sports Car Series	AGT: (United States) Kerry Hitt	2002 Rolex Sports Car Series season
Trans-Am Series	(United States) Boris Said	2002 Trans-Am Series
Trans-Am Series	Teams: (United States) ACS Express Racing	2002 Trans-Am Series
Trans-Am Series	Manufacturers: (United States) Ford	2002 Trans-Am Series
Porsche Supercup, Porsche Carrera Cup, GT3 Cup Challenge and Porsche Sprint Challenge
Porsche Supercup	(Monaco) Stéphane Ortelli	2002 Porsche Supercup
Porsche Supercup	Teams: (Germany) Kadach Tuning	2002 Porsche Supercup
Porsche Carrera Cup France	(France) Sébastian Dumez	2002 Porsche Carrera Cup France
Porsche Carrera Cup France	Teams: (France) SMG	2002 Porsche Carrera Cup France
Porsche Carrera Cup Germany	(Germany) Marc Lieb	2002 Porsche Carrera Cup Germany
Porsche Carrera Cup Germany	Teams: (Germany) UPS Porsche Junior Team	2002 Porsche Carrera Cup Germany
Porsche Carrera Cup Japan	(Japan) Takashi Inoue	2002 Porsche Carrera Cup Japan

== Stock car racing ==
Series	Driver	Season article
NASCAR Winston Cup Series	(United States) Tony Stewart	2002 NASCAR Winston Cup Series
NASCAR Winston Cup Series	Manufacturers: (United States) Ford	2002 NASCAR Winston Cup Series
NASCAR Busch Grand National Series	(United States) Greg Biffle	2002 NASCAR Busch Series
NASCAR Busch Grand National Series	Manufacturers: (United States) Ford	2002 NASCAR Busch Series
NASCAR Craftsman Truck Series	(United States) Mike Bliss	2002 NASCAR Craftsman Truck Series
NASCAR Craftsman Truck Series	Manufacturers: (United States) Chevrolet	2002 NASCAR Craftsman Truck Series
NASCAR Busch North Series	(United States) Andy Santerre	2002 NASCAR Busch North Series
NASCAR Winston West Series	(United States) Eric Norris	2002 NASCAR Winston West Series
ARCA Re/Max Series	(United States) Frank Kimmel	2002 ARCA Re/Max Series
ASCAR Racing Series	(France) Nicolas Minassian	2002 ASCAR season
Australian Super Speedway Championship	(Australia) Andrew Miedecke	2002 Australian Super Speedway Championship
Turismo Carretera	(Argentina) Guillermo Ortelli	2002 Turismo Carretera

== Touring car ==
Series	Driver	Season article
ADAC Procar Series	(Germany) Thomas Klenke	2002 ADAC Procar Series
ADAC Procar Series	Teams: (Germany) Hotfiel Sport	2002 ADAC Procar Series
Asian Touring Car Championship	(Finland) Toni Ruokonen	2002 Asian Touring Car Championship
Asian Touring Car Championship	Teams: (United Kingdom) WK Longman Racing	2002 Asian Touring Car Championship
Australian Saloon Car Series	(Australia) Bruce Heinrich	2002 Australian Saloon Car Series
Australian Super Touring Series	(Australia) Alan Gurr	2002 Australian Super Touring Series
Australian Super Touring Series	Teams: (Australia) Knight Racing	2002 Australian Super Touring Series
British Touring Car Championship	(United Kingdom) James Thompson	2002 British Touring Car Championship
British Touring Car Championship	Teams: (United Kingdom) Vauxhall Motorsport	2002 British Touring Car Championship
British Touring Car Championship	Manufacturers: (United Kingdom) Vauxhall	2002 British Touring Car Championship
British Touring Car Championship	Production: (United Kingdom) James Kaye	2002 British Touring Car Championship
British Touring Car Championship	Production Teams: (United Kingdom) Synchro Motorsport	2002 British Touring Car Championship
British Touring Car Championship	Independent: (United Kingdom) Dan Eaves	2002 British Touring Car Championship
Danish Touringcar Championship	(Denmark) Jason Watt	2002 Danish Touringcar Championship
European Touring Car Championship	Overall: (Italy) Fabrizio Giovanardi	
European Touring Car Championship	Manufacturers: (Italy) Alfa Romeo	
European Touring Car Championship	Independents: (Italy) Fabrizio Giovanardi	
Deutsche Tourenwagen Masters	(France) Laurent Aïello	2002 Deutsche Tourenwagen Masters season
Finnish Touring Car Championship	(Finland) Olli Haapalainen	
French Supertouring Championship	(France) Soheil Ayari	
Italian Super Production Championship	(Italy) Massimo Pigoli	
New Zealand Touring Car Championship	(New Zealand) Barrie Thomlinson	2002 New Zealand Touring Car Championship
New Zealand V8 Championship	(New Zealand) Ashley Stichbury	2001–02 New Zealand V8 season
Norwegian Touring Car Championship	(Norway) Jarle Gåsland	2002 Norwegian Touring Car Championship
Renault Sport Clio Trophy	(Italy) Luca Rangoni	2002 Renault Sport Clio Trophy
Renault Sport Clio Trophy	Teams: (Italy) Autotottoli	2002 Renault Sport Clio Trophy
V8 Supercar Championship Series	(Australia) Mark Skaife	2002 V8 Supercar Championship Series
V8 Supercar Championship Series	Teams: (Australia) Holden Racing Team	2002 V8 Supercar Championship Series
V8 Supercar Championship Series	Manufacturers: (Australia) Holden	2002 V8 Supercar Championship Series
Konica V8 Supercar Series	(Australia) Paul Dumbrell	2002 Konica V8 Supercar Series
Stock Car Brasil	(Brazil) Ingo Hoffmann	2002 Stock Car Brasil season
TC2000 Championship	(Argentina) Norberto Fontana	2002 TC2000 Championship

== Truck racing ==
Series	Driver	Season article
European Truck Racing Championship	Super-Race-Trucks: (Germany) Gerd Körber	2002 European Truck Racing Championship
European Truck Racing Championship	Race-Trucks: (Austria) Egon Allgäuer	2002 European Truck Racing Championship
Fórmula Truck	(Brazil) Roberval Andrade	2002 Fórmula Truck
Fórmula Truck	Teams: (Brazil) Muffatão	2002 Fórmula Truck
V8 BRute Series	(Australia) Warren Luff	2002 V8 BRute Series

== See also ==
- List of motorsport championships
- Auto racing
