= List of 1999 motorsport champions =

1999 motorsport champions
Previous: 1998	Next: 2000

The following list of 1999 motorsport champions is a list of national or international auto racing series with a Championship decided by the points or positions earned by a driver from multiple races.

== Dirt oval racing ==
Series	Champion	Refer
World of Outlaws Sprint Car Series	(United States) Mark Kinser	
World of Outlaws Sprint Car Series	Teams: (United States) Karl Kinser Racing	

== Drag racing ==
Series	Champion	Refer
NHRA Winston Drag Racing Series	Top Fuel: (United States) Tony Schumacher	1999 NHRA Winston Drag Racing Series
NHRA Winston Drag Racing Series	Funny Car: (United States) John Force	1999 NHRA Winston Drag Racing Series
NHRA Winston Drag Racing Series	Pro Stock: (United States) Warren Johnson	1999 NHRA Winston Drag Racing Series
NHRA Winston Drag Racing Series	Pro Stock Motorcycle: (United States) Matt Hines	1999 NHRA Winston Drag Racing Series

== Karting ==
Series	Driver	Season article
CIK-FIA Karting World Championship	FSA: (Italy) Danilo Rossi	
CIK-FIA Karting World Championship	FC: (Italy) Francesco Laudato	
CIK-FIA Karting World Championship	Formula A: (France) Franck Perera	
CIK-FIA Karting European Championship	FSA: (Italy) Giuseppe Palmieri	
CIK-FIA Karting European Championship	FC: (Italy) Ronnie Quintarelli	
CIK-FIA Karting European Championship	FA: (France) Julien Poncelet	
CIK-FIA Karting European Championship	ICA: (Italy) Stefano Fabi	
CIK-FIA Karting European Championship	ICA-J: (Austria) Reinhard Kofler	
CIK-FIA Karting European Championship	Cadet: (Switzerland) Cyndie Allemann	

== Motorcycle ==
Series	Rider	Season article
500cc World Championship	(Spain) Àlex Crivillé	1999 Grand Prix motorcycle racing season
250cc World Championship	(Italy) Valentino Rossi	1999 Grand Prix motorcycle racing season
125cc World Championship	(Spain) Emilio Alzamora	1999 Grand Prix motorcycle racing season
Superbike World Championship	(United Kingdom) Carl Fogarty	1999 Superbike World Championship
Supersport World Championship	(France) Stéphane Chambon	1999 Supersport World Championship
Speedway World Championship	(Sweden) Tony Rickardsson	1999 Speedway Grand Prix
AMA Superbike Championship	(Australia) Mat Mladin	
Australian Superbike Championship	(Australia) Steve Martin	

== Open wheel racing ==
Series	Driver	Season article
FIA Formula One World Championship	(Finland) Mika Häkkinen	1999 Formula One World Championship
FIA Formula One World Championship	Constructors: (Italy) Ferrari	1999 Formula One World Championship
FIA International Formula 3000	(Germany) Nick Heidfeld	1999 International Formula 3000 Championship
FIA International Formula 3000	Teams: (United Kingdom) West Competition	1999 International Formula 3000 Championship
CART FedEx Championship Series	(Colombia) Juan Pablo Montoya	1999 CART season
CART FedEx Championship Series	Manufacturers: (Japan) Honda	1999 CART season
CART FedEx Championship Series	Rookies: (Colombia) Juan Pablo Montoya	1999 CART season
Indy Racing League	(United States) Greg Ray	1999 Indy Racing League
Indy Racing League	Manufacturers: (United States) Oldsmobile	1999 Indy Racing League
Indy Racing League	Rookies: (United States) Scott Harrington	1999 Indy Racing League
Indy Lights	(Spain) Oriol Servià	1999 Indy Lights season
Historic Formula One Championship	(United Kingdom) Bob Berridge	1999 Historic Formula One Championship
American Indycar Series	(United States) Bill Tempero	1999 American Indycar Series
Atlantic Championship	(United States) Anthony Lazzaro	1999 Atlantic Championship season
Australian Drivers' Championship	(New Zealand) Simon Wills	1999 Australian Drivers' Championship
Barber Dodge Pro Series	(United States) Jeff Simmons	1999 Barber Dodge Pro Series
Italian Formula 3000 Championship	(Italy) Giorgio Vinella	1999 Italian Formula 3000 Championship
Formula Palmer Audi	(United Kingdom) Richard Tarling	1999 Formula Palmer Audi
Formula Palmer Audi	Autumn Trophy: (United States) Paul Edwards	1999 Formula Palmer Audi
Euro Open MoviStar by Nissan	(Spain) Fernando Alonso	1999 Euro Open by Nissan
Euro Open MoviStar by Nissan	Teams: (Spain) Campos Racing	1999 Euro Open by Nissan
BOSS Formula Series	(United Kingdom) Tony Worswick	1999 BOSS Formula Series
BOSS Formula Series	Teams: (United Kingdom) Worswick Engineering	1999 BOSS Formula Series
Formula Asia	(Thailand) Nattapong Horthongkum	1999 Formula Asia
Formula BMW ADAC	(Germany) André Lotterer	
Formula BMW ADAC	Teams: (Germany) BMW Rookie Team	
Formula Dream	(Japan) Yuji Ide	1999 Formula Dream
Formula König	(Belgium) Benoit Allart	1999 Formula König season
Formula König	Teams: (Germany) Böhm Motorsport	1999 Formula König season
Formula Maruti	(India) Parthiva Sureshwaren	1999 Formula Maruti season
Formula Nippon Championship	(Netherlands) Tom Coronel	1999 Formula Nippon Championship
Formula Nippon Championship	Teams: (Japan) Nakajima Racing	1999 Formula Nippon Championship
Formula Toyota	(Japan) Kaichi Sato	1999 Formula Toyota season
Formula Toyota	West: (Japan) Satoshi Inoue	1999 Formula Toyota season
JAF Japan Formula 4	Kantō: (Japan) Touya Higuchi	1999 JAF Japan Formula 4
JAF Japan Formula 4	Kansai: (Japan) Keita Sawa	1999 JAF Japan Formula 4
Russian Formula 1600 Championship	(Russia) Alexander Kuzmin	1999 Russian Formula 1600 Championship
Russian Formula 1600 Championship	Teams: (Russia) LogoVAZ-City	1999 Russian Formula 1600 Championship
Star Mazda Championship	(United States) Joey Hand	1999 Star Mazda Championship
Formula Three
All-Japan Formula Three Championship	(United Kingdom) Darren Manning	1999 All-Japan Formula Three Championship
All-Japan Formula Three Championship	Teams: (Japan) TOM'S	1999 All-Japan Formula Three Championship
Austria Formula 3 Cup	(Germany) Andre Fibier	1999 Austria Formula 3 Cup
Austria Formula 3 Cup	Trophy: (Austria) Christian Eigl	1999 Austria Formula 3 Cup
Australian Formula 3 Championship	(Australia) Paul Stephenson	1999 Australian Formula Three Championship
British Formula Three Championship	(United Kingdom) Marc Hynes	1999 British Formula Three Championship
British Formula Three Championship	Class B: (United Kingdom) Martin O'Connell	1999 British Formula Three Championship
Chilean Formula Three Championship	(Chile) Cristobal Ibarra	1999 Chilean Formula Three Championship
French Formula Three Championship	(France) Sébastien Bourdais	1999 French Formula Three Championship
French Formula Three Championship	Teams: (France) La Filiere	1999 French Formula Three Championship
German Formula Three Championship	(Netherlands) Christijan Albers	1999 German Formula Three Championship
German Formula Three Championship	Rookie: (Netherlands) Walter van Lent	1999 German Formula Three Championship
Italian Formula Three Championship	(Sweden) Peter Sundberg	1999 Italian Formula Three Championship
Italian Formula Three Championship	Teams: (Italy) Prema Powerteam	1999 Italian Formula Three Championship
Mexican Formula Three Championship	(Mexico) Eduardo Oliveira	1999 Mexican Formula Three Championship
Russian Formula Three Championship	(Italy) Alberto Pedemonte	1999 Russian Formula Three Championship
Formula 3 Sudamericana	(Brazil) Hoover Orsi	1999 Formula 3 Sudamericana
Formula 3 Sudamericana	National: (Brazil) João Paulo de Oliveira	1999 Formula 3 Sudamericana
Swiss Formula Three Championship	(Switzerland) Jo Zeller	1999 Swiss Formula Three Championship
Swiss Formula Three Championship	Class B: (Switzerland) Andrè Gauch	1999 Swiss Formula Three Championship
Formula Renault
Formula Renault Eurocup	(Italy) Gianmaria Bruni	1999 Formula Renault Eurocup
Formula Renault Eurocup	Teams: (Italy) JD Motorsport	1999 Formula Renault Eurocup
Formula Renault Argentina	(Argentina) Mariano Acebal	1999 Formula Renault Argentina
British Formula Renault Championship	(Brazil) Antônio Pizzonia	1999 British Formula Renault Championship
British Formula Renault Championship	Teams: (United Kingdom) Manor Motorsport	1999 British Formula Renault Championship
Formula Renault BARC	(United Kingdom) Elliot Lewis	1999 Formula Renault BARC
Formula Renault 2.0 Germany	(Hungary) Zsolt Baumgartner	1999 Formula Renault 2.0 Germany
French Formula Renault Championship	(France) Lucas Lasserre	1999 French Formula Renault Championship
Formula Ford
Australian Formula Ford Championship	(Australia) Greg Ritter	1999 Australian Formula Ford Championship
British Formula Ford Championship	(Denmark) Nicolas Kiesa	1999 British Formula Ford Championship
Danish Formula Ford Championship	(Denmark) Anders Ole Egebart	
Dutch Formula Ford Championship	(Netherlands) Vincent van der Valk	1999 Dutch Formula Ford Championship
Formula Ford EuroCup	(Australia) Marcos Ambrose	1999 Formula Ford EuroCup
New Zealand Formula Ford Championship	(New Zealand) LeRoy Stevenson	
Formula Ford 1600 Nordic Championship	(Sweden) Robin Rudholm	
Swedish Formula Ford Championship	(Sweden) Thed Björk	
USF2000 Championship	(United Kingdom) Dan Wheldon	1999 USF2000 Championship

== Rallying ==
Series	Driver/Co-Driver	Season article
World Rally Championship	(Finland) Tommi Mäkinen	1999 World Rally Championship
World Rally Championship	Co-Drivers: (Finland) Risto Mannisenmäki	1999 World Rally Championship
World Rally Championship	Manufacturers: (Japan) Toyota	1999 World Rally Championship
FIA Cup for Production Cars	(Uruguay) Gustavo Trelles	1999 World Rally Championship
African Rally Championship	(Uganda) Charles Muhangi	1999 African Rally Championship
Asia-Pacific Rally Championship	(Japan) Katsuhiko Taguchi	1999 Asia-Pacific Rally Championship
Asia-Pacific Rally Championship	Co-Drivers: (Malaysia) Ron Teoh	1999 Asia-Pacific Rally Championship
Australian Rally Championship	(New Zealand) Possum Bourne	1999 Australian Rally Championship
Australian Rally Championship	Co-Drivers: (Australia) Craig Vincent	1999 Australian Rally Championship
British Rally Championship	(Finland) Tapio Laukkanen	1999 British Rally Championship
British Rally Championship	Co-Drivers: (Finland) Kaj Lindström	1999 British Rally Championship
Canadian Rally Championship	(Canada) Frank Sprongl	1999 Canadian Rally Championship
Canadian Rally Championship	Co-Drivers: (Canada) Dan Sprongl	1999 Canadian Rally Championship
Czech Rally Championship	(Czech Republic) Ladislav Křeček	1999 Czech Rally Championship
Czech Rally Championship	Co-Drivers: (Czech Republic) Jan Krečman	1999 Czech Rally Championship
Deutsche Rallye Meisterschaft	(Germany) Armin Kremer	
Estonian Rally Championship	A>2000: (Estonia) Ivar Raidam	1999 Estonian Rally Championship
Estonian Rally Championship	A>2000 Co-Drivers: (Estonia) Robert Lepikson	1999 Estonian Rally Championship
Estonian Rally Championship	N 2000+: (Estonia) Margus Murakas	1999 Estonian Rally Championship
Estonian Rally Championship	N 2000+ Co-Drivers: (Estonia) Toomas Sildmäe; N 2000+ Co-Drivers: (Estonia) Peep Kallaste	1999 Estonian Rally Championship
European Rally Championship	(Italy) Enrico Bertone	1999 European Rally Championship
European Rally Championship	Co-Drivers: (Italy) Nicola Arena	1999 European Rally Championship
Finnish Rally Championship	Group A +2000cc: (Finland) Pasi Hagström	1999 Finnish Rally Championship
Finnish Rally Championship	Group N +2000cc: (Finland) Janne Tuohino	1999 Finnish Rally Championship
Finnish Rally Championship	Group A -2000cc: (Finland) Kari Kivenne	1999 Finnish Rally Championship
Finnish Rally Championship	Group N -2000cc: (Finland) Tomi Tukiainen	1999 Finnish Rally Championship
French Rally Championship	(France) Philippe Bugalski	
Hungarian Rally Championship	(Hungary) Ferenc Kiss	
Hungarian Rally Championship	Co-Drivers: (Hungary) Ernő Büki	
Indian National Rally Championship	(India) V. R. Naren Kumar	
Indian National Rally Championship	Co-Drivers: (India) Farooq Ahmed	
Italian Rally Championship	(Italy) Andrea Aghini	
Italian Rally Championship	Co-Drivers: (Italy) Loris Roggia	
Italian Rally Championship	Manufacturers: (Japan) Toyota	
Middle East Rally Championship	(United Arab Emirates) Mohammed Ben Sulayem	
New Zealand Rally Championship	(New Zealand) Geoff Argyle	1999 New Zealand Rally Championship
New Zealand Rally Championship	Co-Drivers: (New Zealand) Rob Ryan	1999 New Zealand Rally Championship
Polish Rally Championship	(Poland) Krzysztof Hołowczyc	
Romanian Rally Championship	(Romania) Constantin Aur	
Scottish Rally Championship	(United Kingdom) Jon Burn	
Scottish Rally Championship	Co-Drivers: (United Kingdom) Stan Quirk	
Slovak Rally Championship	(Czech Republic) Stanislav Chovanec	
Slovak Rally Championship	Co-Drivers: (Czech Republic) Karel Holaň	
South African National Rally Championship	(South Africa) Jan Habig	
South African National Rally Championship	Co-Drivers: (South Africa) Douglas Judd	
South African National Rally Championship	Manufacturers: (Japan) Toyota	
Spanish Rally Championship	(Spain) Jesús Puras	
Spanish Rally Championship	Co-Drivers: (Spain) Marc Martí	

=== Rallycross ===
Series	Driver	Season article
FIA European Rallycross Championship	Div 1: (Sweden) Per Eklund	
FIA European Rallycross Championship	Div 2: (Sweden) Magnus Hansen	
FIA European Rallycross Championship	1400 Cup: (Denmark) Johnny Jensen	
British Rallycross Championship	(Republic of Ireland) Dermot Carnegie	

=== Ice racing ===
Series	Driver	Season article
Andros Trophy	Elite: (France) Yvan Muller	1997–98 Andros Trophy
Andros Trophy	Promotion: (France) Philippe de Korsak	1997–98 Andros Trophy
Andros Trophy	Pilot Bike: (France) David Baffeleuf	1997–98 Andros Trophy
Andros Trophy	Dame: (France) Patricia Bertapelle	1997–98 Andros Trophy

== Sports car and GT ==
Series	Driver	Season article
American Le Mans Series	LMP: (United States) Elliott Forbes-Robinson	1999 American Le Mans Series season
American Le Mans Series	GTS: (Monaco) Olivier Beretta	1999 American Le Mans Series season
American Le Mans Series	GT: (United States) Cort Wagner	1999 American Le Mans Series season
British GT Championship	GT1: (United Kingdom) Julian Bailey; GT1: (United Kingdom) Jamie Campbell-Walter	1999 British GT Championship
British GT Championship	GT2: (United Kingdom) David Warnock	1999 British GT Championship
United States Road Racing Championship	Can-Am: (United States) Elliott Forbes-Robinson; Can-Am: (United States) Butch Leitzinger	1999 United States Road Racing Championship season
United States Road Racing Championship	GT2: (United States) Larry Schumacher; GT2: (United States) John O'Steen	1999 United States Road Racing Championship season
United States Road Racing Championship	GT3: (United States) Cort Wagner	1999 United States Road Racing Championship season
Sports Racing World Cup	SR1: (France) Emmanuel Collard; SR1: (Italy) Vincenzo Sospiri	1999 Sports Racing World Cup season
Sports Racing World Cup	SR1 Teams: (France) JB Giesse Team Ferrari	1999 Sports Racing World Cup season
Sports Racing World Cup	SR2: (Italy) Angelo Lancelotti	1999 Sports Racing World Cup season
Sports Racing World Cup	SR2 Teams: (Italy) Cauduro Tampolli Team	1999 Sports Racing World Cup season
FIA GT Championship	(Monaco) Olivier Beretta (Austria) Karl Wendlinger	1999 FIA GT Championship season
FIA GT Championship	Teams: (France) Viper Team Oreca	1999 FIA GT Championship season
Porsche Supercup, Porsche Carrera Cup, GT3 Cup Challenge and Porsche Sprint Challenge
Porsche Supercup	(Netherlands) Patrick Huisman	1999 Porsche Supercup
Porsche Supercup	Teams: (Germany) Olaf Manthey Racing	1999 Porsche Supercup
Porsche Carrera Cup France	(France) Dominique Dupuy	1999 Porsche Carrera Cup France
Porsche Carrera Cup Germany	(Germany) Lucas Luhr	1999 Porsche Carrera Cup Germany
Porsche Carrera Cup Germany	Teams: (Germany) UPS Porsche Junior Team	1999 Porsche Carrera Cup Germany

== Stock car ==
Series	Driver	Season article
NASCAR Winston Cup Series	(United States) Dale Jarrett	1999 NASCAR Winston Cup Series
NASCAR Winston Cup Series	Manufacturers: (United States) Ford	1999 NASCAR Winston Cup Series
NASCAR Busch Grand National Series	(United States) Dale Earnhardt Jr.	1999 NASCAR Busch Series
NASCAR Busch Grand National Series	Manufacturers: (United States) Chevrolet	1999 NASCAR Busch Series
NASCAR Craftsman Truck Series	(United States) Jack Sprague	1999 NASCAR Craftsman Truck Series
NASCAR Craftsman Truck Series	Manufacturers: (United States) Ford	1999 NASCAR Craftsman Truck Series
NASCAR Busch North Series	(United States) Brad Leighton	1999 NASCAR Busch North Series
NASCAR Winston West Series	(United States) Sean Woodside	1999 NASCAR Winston West Series
ARCA Bondo/Mar-Hyde Series	(United States) Bill Baird	1999 ARCA Bondo/Mar-Hyde Series
AUSCAR	(Australia) Leigh Watkins	1998–99 AUSCAR season
Australian Super Speedway Championship	(Australia) Kim Jane	1998–99 Australian Super Speedway Championship
Turismo Carretera	(Argentina) Juan María Traverso	1999 Turismo Carretera

== Touring car ==
Series	Driver	Season article
Shell Championship Series (V8 Supercars)	(Australia) Craig Lowndes	1999 Shell Championship Series
Shell Championship Series (V8 Supercars)	Teams: (Australia) Holden Racing Team	1999 Shell Championship Series
ADAC Procar Series	(Germany) Jürgen Hohenester	1999 ADAC Procar Series
ADAC Procar Series	Teams: (Germany) Hohenester Motorsport	1999 ADAC Procar Series
Australian Super Touring Championship	(Australia) Paul Morris	1999 Australian Super Touring Championship
Australian Super Touring Championship	Teams: (Australia) Volvo Dealer Racing	1999 Australian Super Touring Championship
Australian Super Touring Championship	Manufacturers: (Sweden) Volvo	1999 Australian Super Touring Championship
British Touring Car Championship	(France) Laurent Aïello	1999 British Touring Car Championship
British Touring Car Championship	Teams: (United Kingdom) Vodafone Nissan Racing	1999 British Touring Car Championship
British Touring Car Championship	Manufacturers: (Japan) Nissan	1999 British Touring Car Championship
British Touring Car Championship	Independent: (United Kingdom) Matt Neal	1999 British Touring Car Championship
Danish Touringcar Championship	(Denmark) Jesper Sylvest	1999 Danish Touringcar Championship
Finnish Touring Car Championship	(Finland) Olli Haapalainen	
French Supertouring Championship	(France) William David	
Italian Superturismo Championship	(Italy) Fabrizio Giovanardi	1999 Italian Superturismo Championship
Italian Superturismo Championship	Teams: (Italy) Nordauto Engineering	1999 Italian Superturismo Championship
New Zealand Touring Car Championship	(New Zealand) Jason Richards	1999 New Zealand Touring Car Championship
New Zealand V8 Championship	(New Zealand) Paul Pedersen	1998–99 New Zealand V8 season
Renault Sport Clio Trophy	(France) Jérôme Policand	1999 Renault Sport Clio Trophy
Stock Car Brasil	(Brazil) Chico Serra	1999 Stock Car Brasil season
TC2000 Championship	(Argentina) Juan Manuel Silva	1999 TC2000 Championship

== Truck racing ==
Series	Driver	Season article
European Truck Racing Championship	Super-Race-Trucks: (Germany) Fritz Kreutzpointner	1999 European Truck Racing Championship
European Truck Racing Championship	Race-Trucks: (Germany) Heinz-Werner Lenz	1999 European Truck Racing Championship
Fórmula Truck	(Brazil) Jorge Fleck	1999 Fórmula Truck
Fórmula Truck	Teams: (Brazil) ABF Volvo	1999 Fórmula Truck

== See also ==
- List of motorsport championships
- Auto racing
