= List of 1998 motorsport champions =

1998 motorsport champions
| Previous: 1997 | Next: 1999 |

This list of 1998 motorsport champions is a list of national or international auto racing series with a Championship decided by the points or positions earned by a driver from multiple races.

== Dirt oval racing ==
| Series | Champion | Refer |
|---|---|---|
| World of Outlaws Sprint Car Series | (United States) Steve Kinser | |
| World of Outlaws Sprint Car Series | Teams: (United States) Karl Kinser Racing | |

== Drag racing ==
| Series | Champion | Refer |
|---|---|---|
| NHRA Winston Drag Racing Series | Top Fuel: (United States) Gary Scelzi | 1998 NHRA Winston Drag Racing Series |
| NHRA Winston Drag Racing Series | Funny Car: (United States) John Force | 1998 NHRA Winston Drag Racing Series |
| NHRA Winston Drag Racing Series | Pro Stock: (United States) Warren Johnson | 1998 NHRA Winston Drag Racing Series |
| NHRA Winston Drag Racing Series | Pro Stock Motorcycle: (United States) Matt Hines | 1998 NHRA Winston Drag Racing Series |

== Karting ==
| Series | Driver | Season article |
|---|---|---|
| CIK-FIA Karting World Championship | FSA: (Italy) Davide Forè | |
| CIK-FIA Karting World Championship | FC: (Italy) Gianluca Beggio | |
| CIK-FIA Karting World Championship | Formula A: (Brazil) Ruben Carrapatoso | |
| CIK-FIA Karting European Championship | FSA: (Italy) Davide Forè | |
| CIK-FIA Karting European Championship | FC: (Italy) Gianluca Beggio | |
| CIK-FIA Karting European Championship | FA: (Portugal) César Campaniço | |
| CIK-FIA Karting European Championship | ICA: (France) Julien Poncelet | |
| CIK-FIA Karting European Championship | ICA-J: (France) Frank Pereira | |
| CIK-FIA Karting European Championship | Cadet: (Portugal) Álvaro Parente | |

== Motorcycle ==
| Series | Rider | Season article |
|---|---|---|
| 500cc World Championship | (Australia) Mick Doohan | 1998 Grand Prix motorcycle racing season |
| 250cc World Championship | (Italy) Loris Capirossi | 1998 Grand Prix motorcycle racing season |
| 125cc World Championship | (Japan) Kazuto Sakata | 1998 Grand Prix motorcycle racing season |
| Superbike World Championship | (United Kingdom) Carl Fogarty | 1998 Superbike World Championship season |
| Supersport World Series | (Italy) Fabrizio Pirovano | |
| Speedway World Championship | (Sweden) Tony Rickardsson | 1998 Speedway Grand Prix |
| AMA Superbike Championship | (United States) Ben Bostrom | |
| Australian Superbike Championship | (Australia) Martin Craggill | |

== Open wheel racing ==
| Series | Driver | Season article |
|---|---|---|
| FIA Formula One World Championship | (Finland) Mika Häkkinen | 1998 Formula One World Championship |
| FIA Formula One World Championship | Constructors: (United Kingdom) McLaren-Mercedes | 1998 Formula One World Championship |
| CART FedEx Championship Series | (Italy) Alex Zanardi | 1998 CART FedEx Championship Series |
| CART FedEx Championship Series | Manufacturers: (Japan) Honda | 1998 CART FedEx Championship Series |
| CART FedEx Championship Series | Rookies: (Brazil) Tony Kanaan | 1998 CART FedEx Championship Series |
| Indy Racing League | (Sweden) Kenny Bräck | 1998 Indy Racing League |
| Indy Racing League | Manufacturers: (United States) Oldsmobile | 1998 Indy Racing League |
| Indy Racing League | Rookies: (United States) Robby Unser | 1998 Indy Racing League |
| International Formula 3000 | (Colombia) Juan Pablo Montoya | 1998 International Formula 3000 Championship |
| Formula Nippon Championship | (Japan) Satoshi Motoyama | 1998 Formula Nippon Championship |
| Formula Nippon Championship | Teams: (Japan) LEMONed Racing Team LeMans | 1998 Formula Nippon Championship |
| Indy Lights | (Brazil) Cristiano da Matta | 1998 Indy Lights season |
| Historic Formula One Championship | (United Kingdom) Bob Berridge | 1998 Historic Formula One Championship |
| American Indycar Series | (United States) Greg Gorden | 1998 American Indycar Series |
| Atlantic Championship | (Canada) Lee Bentham | 1998 Atlantic Championship season |
| Australian Drivers' Championship | (New Zealand) Scott Dixon | 1998 Australian Drivers' Championship |
| Barber Dodge Pro Series | (United States) Jeff Simmons | 1998 Barber Dodge Pro Series |
| Formula Palmer Audi | (United Kingdom) Justin Wilson | 1998 Formula Palmer Audi |
| Formula Palmer Audi | Autumn Trophy: (United Kingdom) Derek Hayes | 1998 Formula Palmer Audi |
| BOSS Formula Series | (United Kingdom) Nigel Greensall | 1998 BOSS Formula Series |
| BOSS Formula Series | Teams: (United Kingdom) European Aviation | 1998 BOSS Formula Series |
| Open Fortuna by Nissan | (Spain) Marc Gené | 1998 Euro Open by Nissan season |
| Formula Asia | (Australia) Ben Walsh | 1998 Formula Asia |
| JAF Japan Formula 4 | (Japan) Takeyuki Kishi | 1998 JAF Japan Formula 4 |
| Formula König | (Netherlands) Elran Nijenhuis | 1998 Formula König season |
| Formula Toyota | (Japan) Masahiro Tsukiji | 1998 Formula Toyota season |
| Formula Toyota | West: (Japan) Tomoyuki Inoue | 1998 Formula Toyota season |
| Russian Formula 1600 Championship | (Russia) Alexander Nesterov | 1998 Russian Formula 1600 Championship |
| Russian Formula 1600 Championship | Teams: (Russia) ABRO-NVR-100 | 1998 Russian Formula 1600 Championship |
| Russian Formula 1600 Championship | ASPAS Cup: (Russia) Edgard Lindgren | 1998 Russian Formula 1600 Championship |
| Russian Formula 1600 Championship | ASPAS Cup Teams: (Russia) AKKS Motorsport | 1998 Russian Formula 1600 Championship |
| Star Mazda Championship | (United States) Ian Lacy | 1998 Star Mazda Championship |
Formula Three
| All-Japan Formula Three Championship | (United Kingdom) Peter Dumbreck | 1998 All-Japan Formula Three Championship |
| All-Japan Formula Three Championship | Teams: (Japan) TOM'S | 1998 All-Japan Formula Three Championship |
| Austria Formula 3 Cup | (Germany) Andre Fibier | 1998 Austria Formula 3 Cup |
| Austria Formula 3 Cup | Trophy: (Germany) Jörg Sandek | 1998 Austria Formula 3 Cup |
| British Formula 3 Championship | (Brazil) Mário Haberfeld | 1998 British Formula Three Championship |
| British Formula 3 Championship | National: (Australia) Phillip Scifleet | 1998 British Formula Three Championship |
| Chilean Formula Three Championship | (Chile) Mauricio Perrot | 1998 Chilean Formula Three Championship |
| French Formula Three Championship | (Belgium) David Saelens | 1998 French Formula Three Championship |
| French Formula Three Championship | Teams: (France) ASM Formule 3 | 1998 French Formula Three Championship |
| German Formula Three Championship | (Belgium) Bas Leinders | 1998 German Formula Three Championship |
| German Formula Three Championship | Rookie: (Austria) Robert Lechner | 1998 German Formula Three Championship |
| Italian Formula Three Championship | (Netherlands) Donny Crevels | |
| Formula 3 Sudamericana | (Argentina) Gabriel Furlán | 1998 Formula 3 Sudamericana |
| Formula 3 Sudamericana | National: (Chile) Ramón Ibarra | 1998 Formula 3 Sudamericana |
| Mexican Formula Three Championship | (Mexico) Carlos Perea | 1998 Mexican Formula Three Championship |
| Russian Formula Three Championship | (Russia) Viktor Kozankov | 1998 Russian Formula Three Championship |
| Russian Formula Three Championship | ASPAS Cup: (Italy) Alberto Pedemonte | 1998 Russian Formula Three Championship |
| Swiss Formula Three Championship | (Switzerland) Jo Zeller | 1998 Swiss Formula Three Championship |
| Swiss Formula Three Championship | Class B: (Switzerland) Thomas Stingelin | 1998 Swiss Formula Three Championship |
Formula Renault
| French Formula Renault Championship | (United Kingdom) Matthew Davies | 1998 French Formula Renault Championship |
| Eurocup Formula Renault | (France) Bruno Besson | |
| Eurocup Formula Renault | Teams: (Italy) Tatuus JD Motorsport | |
| Formula Renault Argentina | (Argentina) Gabriel Ponce de León | 1998 Formula Renault Argentina |
| Formula Renault Germany | (Netherlands) Hugo van der Ham | 1998 Formula Renault Germany |
| Formula Renault Sport UK | (Brazil) Aluizio Coelho | 1998 Formula Renault Sport UK |
| Formula Renault Sport UK | Teams: (United Kingdom) Manor Motorsport | 1998 Formula Renault Sport UK |
| Formula Renault BARC | (United Kingdom) Nick Dudfield | 1998 Formula Renault BARC |
| Formula Renault Campus France | (United Kingdom) Westley Barber | |
| Formula Renault Campus Italy | (Italy) Gianmaria Bruni | |
Formula BMW
| Formula BMW ADAC | (Germany) Stefan Mücke | |
| Formula BMW ADAC | Teams: (Germany) Mücke Motorsport | |
Formula Ford
| Australian Formula Ford Championship | (Australia) Adam Macrow | 1998 Australian Formula Ford Championship |
| British Formula Ford Championship | (United Kingdom) Jenson Button | |
| European Formula Ford Championship | (United Kingdom) Derek Hayes | 1998 European Formula Ford Championship |
| Danish Formula Ford Championship | (Denmark) Michael Pedersen | |
| Formula Ford Zetec Benelux | (Netherlands) Jeroen Bleekemolen | |
| Formula Ford 1800 Netherlands | (Netherlands) Jeroen Bleekemolen | |
| Formula Ford 1600 Nordic | (Sweden) Robert Dahlgren | |
| Formula Ford 1600 Sweden | (Sweden) Robert Dahlgren | |
| New Zealand Formula Ford Championship | (New Zealand) Greg Tullet | |
| Portuguese Formula Ford Championship | (Portugal) Ricardo Mégre | |
| Scottish Formula Ford Championship | (United Kingdom) Stewart Roden | |
| U.S. F2000 National Championship | (Australia) David Besnard | 1998 U.S. F2000 National Championship |

== Rallying ==
| Series | Driver/Co-Driver | Season article |
|---|---|---|
| World Rally Championship | (Finland) Tommi Mäkinen | 1998 World Rally Championship |
| World Rally Championship | Co-Drivers: (Finland) Risto Mannisenmäki | 1998 World Rally Championship |
| World Rally Championship | Manufacturer: (Japan) Mitsubishi | 1998 World Rally Championship |
| FIA Cup for Production Cars | (Uruguay) Gustavo Trelles | 1998 World Rally Championship |
| African Rally Championship | (Zambia) Satwant Singh | 1998 African Rally Championship |
| Asia-Pacific Rally Championship | (Japan) Yoshio Fujimoto | 1998 Asia-Pacific Rally Championship |
| Asia-Pacific Rally Championship | Co-Drivers: (New Zealand) Tony Sircombe | 1998 Asia-Pacific Rally Championship |
| Asia-Pacific Rally Championship | Manufacturers: (Japan) Toyota | 1998 Asia-Pacific Rally Championship |
| Asia-Pacific Rally Championship | Group N: (Australia) Michael Guest | 1998 Asia-Pacific Rally Championship |
| Asia-Pacific Rally Championship | 2-Litre: (Japan) Nobuhiro Tajima | 1998 Asia-Pacific Rally Championship |
| Australian Rally Championship | (New Zealand) Possum Bourne | 1998 Australian Rally Championship |
| Australian Rally Championship | Co-Drivers: (Australia) Craig Vincent | 1998 Australian Rally Championship |
| British Rally Championship | (United Kingdom) Martin Rowe | 1998 British Rally Championship |
| British Rally Championship | Co-Drivers: (United Kingdom) Derek Ringer | 1998 British Rally Championship |
| Canadian Rally Championship | (Canada) Frank Sprongl | 1998 Canadian Rally Championship |
| Canadian Rally Championship | Co-Drivers: (Canada) Dan Sprongl | 1998 Canadian Rally Championship |
| Czech Rally Championship | (Czech Republic) Ladislav Křeček | 1998 Czech Rally Championship |
| Czech Rally Championship | Co-Drivers: (Czech Republic) Jan Krečman | 1998 Czech Rally Championship |
| Deutsche Rallye Meisterschaft | (Germany) Armin Kremer | |
| Estonian Rally Championship | N 2000+: (Estonia) Markko Märtin | 1998 Estonian Rally Championship |
| Estonian Rally Championship | N 2000+ Co-Drivers: (Estonia) Toomas Kitsing | 1998 Estonian Rally Championship |
| Estonian Rally Championship | A>2000: (Estonia) Riho Parts | 1998 Estonian Rally Championship |
| Estonian Rally Championship | A>2000 Co-Drivers: (Estonia) Aare Kaaristo | 1998 Estonian Rally Championship |
| European Rally Championship | (Italy) Andrea Navarra | 1998 European Rally Championship |
| European Rally Championship | Co-Drivers: (Italy) Renzo Casazza | 1998 European Rally Championship |
| Finnish Rally Championship | Group A +2000cc: (Finland) Marcus Grönholm | 1998 Finnish Rally Championship |
| Finnish Rally Championship | Group N +2000cc: (Finland) Jouko Puhakka | 1998 Finnish Rally Championship |
| Finnish Rally Championship | Group A -2000cc: (Finland) Esa Saarenpää | 1998 Finnish Rally Championship |
| Finnish Rally Championship | Group N -2000cc: (Finland) Hannu Jokinen | 1998 Finnish Rally Championship |
| French Rally Championship | (France) Philippe Bugalski | |
| Hungarian Rally Championship | (Hungary) Ferenc Kiss | |
| Hungarian Rally Championship | Co-Drivers: (Hungary) Ernő Büki | |
| Indian National Rally Championship | (India) N. Leelakrishnan | |
| Indian National Rally Championship | Co-Drivers: (India) Farooq Ahmed | |
| Italian Rally Championship | (Italy) Andrea Aghini | |
| Italian Rally Championship | Co-Drivers: (Italy) Loris Roggia | |
| Italian Rally Championship | Manufacturers: (Japan) Toyota | |
| Middle East Rally Championship | (United Arab Emirates) Mohammed Ben Sulayem | |
| New Zealand Rally Championship | (New Zealand) Geoff Argyle | 1998 New Zealand Rally Championship |
| New Zealand Rally Championship | Co-Drivers: (New Zealand) Alan Glen | 1998 New Zealand Rally Championship |
| Polish Rally Championship | (Poland) Robert Gryczyński | |
| Romanian Rally Championship | (Romania) Constantin Aur | |
| Scottish Rally Championship | (United Kingdom) Jimmy Paterson | |
| Scottish Rally Championship | Co-Drivers: (United Kingdom) Fred Bell | |
| Slovak Rally Championship | (Italy) Enrico Bertone | |
| Slovak Rally Championship | Co-Drivers: (Slovakia) Michal Kočí | |
| South African National Rally Championship | (Belgium) Serge Damseaux | |
| South African National Rally Championship | Co-Drivers: (South Africa) Vito Bonafede | |
| South African National Rally Championship | Manufacturers: (Japan) Toyota | |
| Spanish Rally Championship | (Spain) Jesús Puras | |
| Spanish Rally Championship | Co-Drivers: (Spain) Carlos del Barrio | |

=== Rallycross ===
| Series | Driver | Season article |
|---|---|---|
| FIA European Rallycross Championship | Div 1: (Sweden) Kenneth Hansen | |
| FIA European Rallycross Championship | Div 2: (Norway) Eivind Opland | |
| FIA European Rallycross Championship | 1400 Cup: (Czech Republic) Jaroslav Kalný | |
| British Rallycross Championship | (Republic of Ireland) Helmut Holfeld | |

=== Ice racing ===
| Series | Driver | Season article |
|---|---|---|
| Andros Trophy | Elite: (France) Yvan Muller | 1997–98 Andros Trophy |
| Andros Trophy | Promotion: (France) Claude Millet | 1997–98 Andros Trophy |
| Andros Trophy | Pilot Bike: (France) David Baffeleuf | 1997–98 Andros Trophy |
| Andros Trophy | Dame: (Germany) Jutta Kleinschmidt | 1997–98 Andros Trophy |

== Sports car and GT ==
| Series | Driver | Season article |
|---|---|---|
| Professional SportsCar Racing Championship | WSC: (United States) Butch Leitzinger | 1998 IMSA GT Championship season |
| Professional SportsCar Racing Championship | GT1: (United Kingdom) Andy Wallace | 1998 IMSA GT Championship season |
| Professional SportsCar Racing Championship | GT2: (United States) Larry Schumacher | 1998 IMSA GT Championship season |
| Professional SportsCar Racing Championship | GT3: (United States) Mark Simo | 1998 IMSA GT Championship season |
| United States Road Racing Championship | Can-Am: (United Kingdom) James Weaver | 1998 United States Road Racing Championship season |
| United States Road Racing Championship | GT1: (Belgium) Thierry Boutsen | 1998 United States Road Racing Championship season |
| United States Road Racing Championship | GT2: (United States) Scott Sansone; GT2: (United States) Cameron Worth | 1998 United States Road Racing Championship season |
| United States Road Racing Championship | GT3: (Canada) Ross Bentley | 1998 United States Road Racing Championship season |
| International Sports Racing Series | SR1: (France) Emmanuel Collard; SR1: (Italy) Vincenzo Sospiri | 1998 International Sports Racing Series season |
| International Sports Racing Series | SR1 Teams: (France) JB Giesse Team Ferrari | 1998 International Sports Racing Series season |
| International Sports Racing Series | SR2: (France) Jean-Claude de Castelli | 1998 International Sports Racing Series season |
| International Sports Racing Series | SR2 Teams: (France) Waterair Sport | 1998 International Sports Racing Series season |
| FIA GT Championship | GT1: (Germany) Klaus Ludwig; GT1: (Brazil) Ricardo Zonta | 1998 FIA GT Championship season |
| FIA GT Championship | GT2: (Monaco) Olivier Beretta; GT2: (Portugal) Pedro Lamy | 1998 FIA GT Championship season |
| GTR Euroseries | (Germany) Thomas Bscher | |
| All Japan GT Championship | (France) Érik Comas (Japan) Masami Kageyama | |
| British GT Championship | GT1: (United Kingdom) Steve O'Rourke; GT1: (United Kingdom) Tim Sugden | |
| British GT Championship | GT2: (United Kingdom) Richard Dean; GT2: (United Kingdom) Kurt Luby | |
| Trans-Am | (United States) Paul Gentilozzi | |
Porsche Supercup, Porsche Carrera Cup, GT3 Cup Challenge and Porsche Sprint Challenge
| Porsche Supercup | (Netherlands) Patrick Huisman | 1998 Porsche Supercup |
| Porsche Supercup | Teams: (Germany) Olaf Manthey Racing | 1998 Porsche Supercup |
| Porsche Carrera Cup France | (France) Dominique Dupuy | 1998 Porsche Carrera Cup France |
| Porsche Carrera Cup Germany | (Germany) Dirk Müller | 1998 Porsche Carrera Cup Germany |
| Porsche Carrera Cup Germany | Teams: (Germany) UPS Porsche Junior Team | 1998 Porsche Carrera Cup Germany |

== Stock car ==
| Series | Driver | Season article |
|---|---|---|
| NASCAR Winston Cup Series | (United States) Jeff Gordon | 1998 NASCAR Winston Cup Series |
| NASCAR Winston Cup Series | Manufacturers: (United States) Chevrolet | 1998 NASCAR Winston Cup Series |
| NASCAR Busch Grand National Series | (United States) Dale Earnhardt Jr. | 1998 NASCAR Busch Series |
| NASCAR Busch Grand National Series | Manufacturers: (United States) Chevrolet | 1998 NASCAR Busch Series |
| NASCAR Craftsman Truck Series | (United States) Ron Hornaday Jr. | 1998 NASCAR Craftsman Truck Series |
| NASCAR Craftsman Truck Series | Manufacturers: (United States) Chevrolet | 1998 NASCAR Craftsman Truck Series |
| NASCAR Busch North Series | (United States) Mike Stefanik | 1998 NASCAR Busch North Series |
| NASCAR Winston West Series | (United States) Kevin Harvick | 1998 NASCAR Winston West Series |
| ARCA Bondo/Mar-Hyde Series | (United States) Frank Kimmel | 1998 ARCA Bondo/Mar-Hyde Series |
| AUSCAR | (Australia) Darren McDonald | 1997–98 AUSCAR season |
| Australian Super Speedway Championship | (Australia) Kim Jane | 1997–98 Australian Super Speedway Championship |
| Turismo Carretera | (Argentina) Guillermo Ortelli | 1998 Turismo Carretera |

== Touring car ==
| Series | Driver | Season article |
|---|---|---|
| ADAC Procar Series | (Germany) Thomas Winkelhock | 1998 ADAC Procar Series |
| ADAC Procar Series | Teams: (Netherlands) Brinkmann Motorsport | 1998 ADAC Procar Series |
| Australian Touring Car Championship | (Australia) Craig Lowndes | 1998 Australian Touring Car Championship |
| Australian Super Touring Championship | (Australia) Brad Jones | 1998 Australian Super Touring Championship |
| Australian Super Touring Championship | Manufacturers': Audi | 1998 Australian Super Touring Championship |
| Australian Super Touring Championship | Teams: Audi Sport Australia | 1998 Australian Super Touring Championship |
| British Touring Car Championship | (Sweden) Rickard Rydell | 1998 British Touring Car Championship |
| British Touring Car Championship | Teams: (United Kingdom) Vodafone Nissan Racing | 1998 British Touring Car Championship |
| British Touring Car Championship | Manufacturers: (Japan) Nissan | 1998 British Touring Car Championship |
| British Touring Car Championship | Independent: (Norway) Tommy Rustad | 1998 British Touring Car Championship |
| Finnish Touring Car Championship | (Finland) Arto Salmenautio | |
| French Touring Car Championship | (France) Éric Cayrolle | |
| French Supertouring Championship | (France) Éric Cayrolle | |
| German Supertouring Championship | (Venezuela) Johnny Cecotto | |
| Italian Superturismo Championship | (Italy) Fabrizio Giovanardi | 1998 Italian Superturismo Championship |
| Italian Superturismo Championship | Teams: (Italy) Nordauto Engineering | 1998 Italian Superturismo Championship |
| Japanese Touring Car Championship | (Japan) Masanori Sekiya | 1998 Japanese Touring Car Championship |
| Japanese Touring Car Championship | Teams: (Japan) Toyota Team TOM'S | 1998 Japanese Touring Car Championship |
| New Zealand Touring Car Championship | (New Zealand) Brett Riley | 1998 New Zealand Touring Car Championship |
| New Zealand V8 Championship | (New Zealand) Wayne Huxford | 1997–98 New Zealand V8 season |
| Renault Sport Spider Elf Trophy | (Italy) Andrea Belicchi | 1998 Renault Sport Spider Elf Trophy |
| South African Touring Car Championship | (South Africa) Giniel de Villiers | |
| Spanish Touring Car Championship | (Spain) Alfredo Mostajo | 1998 Campeonato de España de Turismos Series |
| Stock Car Brasil | (Brazil) Ingo Hoffmann | 1998 Stock Car Brasil season |
| Swedish Touring Car Championship | (Sweden) Fredrik Ekblom | |
| TC2000 Championship | (Argentina) Omar Martínez | 1998 TC2000 Championship |

== Truck racing ==
| Series | Driver | Season article |
|---|---|---|
| European Truck Racing Championship | Super-Race-Trucks: (France) Ludovic Faure | 1998 European Truck Racing Championship |
| European Truck Racing Championship | Race-Trucks: (Germany) Heinz-Werner Lenz | 1998 European Truck Racing Championship |
| Fórmula Truck | (Brazil) Oswaldo Drugovich Jr. | 1998 Fórmula Truck |
| Fórmula Truck | Teams: (Brazil) Drugovich Auto Peças | 1998 Fórmula Truck |

== See also ==
- List of motorsport championships
- Auto racing
