= Sergio Santander =

- Born: 5 March 1954 Arica, Chile
- Died: 26 September 1987 (aged 33) Santiago, Chile

Championship titles
- 1981: Chilean F3

Sergio Santander Benavente (5 March 1954 – 26 September 1987) was a Chileracecar driver. He was the Chilean Formula 3 Champion in 1981.

Santander was killed on 26 September 1987 at the age of 33 in a crash in the Chilean F3 race at the Autódromo Las Vizcachas in Santiago.
