= 2000 Formula Toyota season =

2000 Formula Toyota

Seasons
- ← 1999 2001 →

The 2000 Esso Formula Toyota season was the 11th season of the Formula Toyota and first season since the merger between the Main and West championships

== Drivers ==
All cars are Toyota 4A-GE powered, Tom's built Toyota FT20's.

No.	Driver
3	(Japan) Naoki Yokomizo
8	(Japan) Naoki Yokomizo
13	(Japan) Toda Takao
14	(Japan) Takashi Kogure
15	(Japan) Satoshi Inoue
20	(Republic of Ireland) Jeff Wright
22	(Japan) Kai Kanjin
24	(Japan) Tsubo-rin Takaya
28	(Japan) Kazuaki Kudo
29	(Japan) Fukutagawa Yu
32	(Japan) Tomomori Yuichi
36	(Japan) Ito Mototsukasa
38	(Japan) Akajima Yohei
62	(Japan) Satoshi Goto
63	(Japan) Takahiro Ito
71	(Japan) Kenji Ito
77	(Japan) An Mitsuki
89	(Japan) Tasaki Norihiko
92	(Japan) Ikeda Kuniteru
99	(Japan) Nobukiyo Yuho

== Event calendar and results ==
Round	Circuit	Location	Date	Pole position	Fastest lap	Winning driver
1	Suzuka Circuit	Suzuka, Mie	March 26	(Japan) Nobukiyo Yuho	???	(Japan) Nobukiyo Yuho
2	Tsukuba Circuit	Shimotsuma, Ibaraki	April 9	(Japan) Satoshi Goto	???	(Japan) Satoshi Goto
3	Fuji International Speedway	Oyama, Shizuoka	May 4	(Japan) Kenji Ito	???	(Republic of Ireland) Jeff Wright
4	Fuji International Speedway	Oyama, Shizuoka	June 4	(Japan) Tomomori Yuichi	???	(Japan) Satoshi Goto
5	Sports Land SUGO	Murata, Miyagi	July 30	(Japan) Satoshi Goto	???	(Japan) Satoshi Goto
6	Suzuka Circuit	Suzuka, Mie	August 27	(Japan) Kenji Ito	???	(Japan) Kenji Ito
7	Mine Circuit	Mine, Yamaguchi	September 17	(Japan) Satoshi Goto	???	(Japan) Satoshi Goto
8	Mine Circuit	Mine, Yamaguchi	October 1	(Japan) Tasaki Norihiko	???	(Japan) Tasaki Norihiko
9	Fuji International Speedway	Oyama, Shizuoka	October 15	(Japan) Naoki Yokomizo	???	(Japan) Naoki Yokomizo
10	Sports Land SUGO	Murata, Miyagi	October 29	(Republic of Ireland) Jeff Wright	???	(Republic of Ireland) Jeff Wright

== Final standings ==
Position	Driver	Points
1	(Japan) Satoshi Goto	137
2	(Japan) Kenji Ito	100
3	(Japan) Naoki Yokomizo	69
4	(Republic of Ireland) Jeff Wright	67
5	(Japan) Takashi Kogure	58
