= Formula Dream =

Japanese motor racing series

- Category: Single seaters
- Country: Japan
- Inaugural season: 1999
- Folded: 2005
- Last Drivers' champion: (Japan) Koudai Tsukakoshi
- Last Makes' champion: Dome-Honda
- Official website: formula-dream.com/

Formula Dream was an open wheel racing series based in Japan. The series was replaced by Formula Challenge Japan in 2006.

== Champions ==
Season	Champion	Car
1999	(Japan) Yuji Ide	Dome-Mugen
2000	(Japan) Kosuke Matsuura	Dome-Mugen
2001	(Japan) Shinya Hosokawa	Dome-Mugen
2002	(Japan) Yuki Shibata	Dome-Mugen
2003	(Japan) Hideki Mutoh	Dome-Mugen
2004	(Japan) Yasuhiro Takasaki	Dome-Honda
2005	(Japan) Koudai Tsukakoshi	Dome-Honda

== Circuits ==
- (Japan) Suzuka Circuit (1999–2005)
- (Japan) Twin Ring Motegi (1999–2003)
- (Japan) Okayama International Circuit (2002–2003, 2005)

== See also ==
- Formula Nippon
- Formula Challenge Japan
