= Formula Toyota =

Racing championship in Japan

- Category: Single seaters
- Inaugural season: 1990
- Folded: 2007
- Constructors: Argo-Tom's (1990–1994); Tom's (1995–2001); Toyota (2002–2007)
- Engine suppliers: Toyota
- Tyre suppliers: Bridgestone (2002–2007)
- Last Drivers' champion: (Italy) Kei Cozzolino
- Last Teams' champion: (Japan) Team Le Beauset
- Official website: Formula Toyota

Formula Toyota was a spec racing series in Japan between 1991 and 2007. Many Japanese Formula One drivers, like Kazuki Nakajima and Toranosuke Takagi, made their racing debut in the Formula Toyota. The class folded after the 2007 season when it was effectively replaced by the Formula Challenge Japan.

== History ==
The Formula Toyota held its inaugural race in 1990, this race was won by Masami Kageyama. Toyota launched their first Formula 3 engine in 1991 and won both the drivers title and engine title in the 1991 Japanese Formula Three Championship. Together with their Formula 3 engine Toyota launched their own racing class, Formula Toyota. The first generation car, the Argo-Tom's FT10, uses an aluminium monocoque. The car was powered by a Toyota 4A-GE engine, which produced 140hp. The FT10 was used until 1994 when it was replaced by a Tom's built FT20. This car was powered by a 5-valve engine, replacing the previous 4-valve engine. In 1995 the Formula Toyota Racing School was founded and the best driver from each class won a fully funded drive in the Formula Toyota championship. Between 1991 and 1999 there were two Formula Toyota championships, Main and West. But after the fields became smaller Toyota merged the two classes into one class for the 2000 season. The championships last race was on November 25, 2007 at Fuji International Speedway. The race was won by Italian-Japanese driver Kei Cozzolino. Team Le Beauset was the most successful team in Formula Toyota, their drivers won the championship six times.

The series folded after the creation of the Formula Challenge Japan. Nissan, Honda and Toyota joined forces and created this racing class in 2006. The Formula Challenge Japan was replaced by the Japan Formula 4 after the 2013 season. In New Zealand the Toyota Racing Series, also known as Formula Toyota, currently uses a Tatuus built Toyota FT40. There is no relationship between the Japanese series and this one except the use of Toyota engines.

== Champions ==
Year	Championship		Car
1990	(Japan) Masami Kageyama		Argo-Tom's FT10
	Main	West	
1991	(Japan) Eiichi Tajima	(Japan) Hidehiro Mochizuki	Argo-Tom's FT10
1992	(Japan) Tomoyuki Hosono	(Japan) Masayuki Yamamoto	Argo-Tom's FT10
1993	(Japan) Mitsuhiro Kinoshita	(Japan) Eiji Sengoku	Argo-Tom's FT10
1994	(Japan) Shigeaki Hattori	(Japan) Jiro Nakatani	Argo-Tom's FT10
1995	(Japan) Takahiro Fujita	(Japan) Yuji Tachikawa	Tom's FT20
1996	(Japan) Yasuhisa Fujiwara	(Japan) Shinya Kurushima	Tom's FT20
1997	(Argentina) Rubén Derfler	(Japan) Shinichi Takagi	Tom's FT20
1998	(Japan) Masahiro Tsukiji	(Japan) Tomoyuki Inoue	Tom's FT20
1999	(Japan) Kaichi Sato	(Japan) Satoshi Inoue	Tom's FT20
	Championship		
2000	(Japan) Satoshi Goto		Tom's FT20
2001	(Japan) Naoki Yokomizo		Tom's FT20
2002	(Japan) Wataru Kobayakawa		FT30
2003	(Japan) Kazuki Nakajima		FT30
2004	(Japan) Hideto Yasuoka		FT30
2005	(Japan) Kazuya Oshima		FT30
2006	(Japan) Yuhi Sekiguchi		FT30
2007	(Italy) Kei Cozzolino		FT30

== Other notable drivers ==
- Toranosuke Takagi, Formula 1 driver for Tyrrell in 1998 and Arrows in 1999
- Takashi Kogure, Super GT and Formula Nippon driver
- Hiroki Yoshimoto, former GP2 Series driver and WTCC driver
- Kohei Hirate, former GP2 Series driver and former test driver for Toyota Racing
- Keisuke Kunimoto, winner of the 2008 Macau Grand Prix Formula Three race
- Yuji Kunimoto, 2010 All-Japan Formula Three champion
- Takuto Iguchi, Super GT GT300 driver
