= Formula Asia =

Former Single-Seater Racing Championship

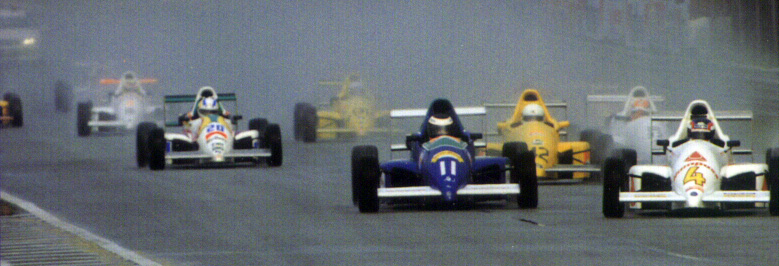
A Formula Asia 2000 race.

Formula Asia, also known as Asian Formula 2000, was a class of open wheel formula racing. The formula used an Argo chassis coupled with a 16-valve Ford Zetec 1,800cc engine.

There was only one championship held in Asia from 1994 until 2002, organized and promoted by Motorsport Asia Ltd. It was established to assist young Asian drivers make the transition from karting to European formulae such as Formula Ford and Formula Renault. Rounds were held in India, Indonesia, Malaysia and China. A special invitation race was also held annually at the Macau Grand Prix. It was replaced by Formula BMW Asia in 2003.

Japanese female driver Keiko Ihara finished third in the AF2000 race at the 2002 Macau Grand Prix, becoming the first woman on the podium in the event's 50-year history.

Drivers who have taken part in Formula Asia include: Michael Vergers, Narain Karthikeyan, Alex Yoong, Ananda Mikola, Bagoes Hermanto, Takuma Sato, Mark Goddard, Parthiva Sureshwaren, Karun Chandhok, Denis Lian, Jim Ka To and Danny Watts.

The cars were later used as a support class with the Asian Formula Three cars.

== Past champions ==
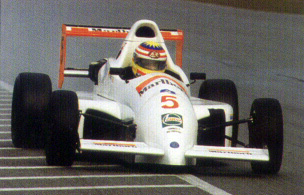
Alex Yoong driving a Formula Asia car.

- 1996 (India) Narain Karthikeyan
- 1997 (Indonesia) Bagoes Hermanto
- 1998 (Australia) Ben Walsh
- 1999 (Thailand) Nattapong Horthongkum
- 2000 (Malaysia) Ng Wai-Leong
- 2001 (India) Karun Chandhok
- 2002 (Singapore) Denis Lian

== Macau Asian Formula 2000 Challenge winners ==
- 1999 (Japan) Takuma Sato
- 2000 (France) Philippe Descombes
- 2001 (France) Philippe Descombes
- 2002 (United Kingdom) Danny Watts
