= Finnish Touring Car Championship =

The Finnish Touring Car Championship is a domestic saloon car series. As of the 2007 season it became eligible to become part of the FIA European Touring Car Cup.

== Champions ==
Season	Champion	Team
1987	(Finland) Leif Wiik	Volvo Finland
1988–1995	Unknown	
1996	(Finland) Toni Rasmus Ruokonen	Rasmus Speed
1997	(Finland) Heikki Salmenautio	OS Motorsport
1998	(Finland) Arto Salmenautio	OS Motorsport
1999	(Finland) Olli Haapalainen	Lehtonen Motorsport
2000	(Finland) Olli Haapalainen	Lehtonen Motorsport
2001	(Finland) Olli Haapalainen	Lehtonen Motorsport
2002	(Finland) Olli Haapalainen	Lehtonen Motorsport
2003	(Finland) Pasi Lähteenmäki	Kuusijärvi Racing
2004	(Finland) Olli Haapalainen	Lehtonen Motorsport
2005	(Finland) Pasi Lähteenmäki	Kuusijärvi Racing Team
2006	(Finland) Ari Laivola	Sarlin Race Tech
2007	(Finland) Pasi Lähteenmäki	Kuusijärvi Racing Team
2008	(Finland) Mikko Eskelinen	GTM Finland
2009	(Finland) Mikko Tiainen	MJT Racing
