= Russian Formula Three Championship =

- Category: Single-seater
- Country: Russia
- Inaugural season: 1997
- Folded: 2008
- Constructors: ArtTech, Astrada, Dallara
- Last Drivers' champion: (Russia) Vladimir Semyonov
- Last Teams' champion: ArtLine Engineering
- Official website: http://www.f1600.ru

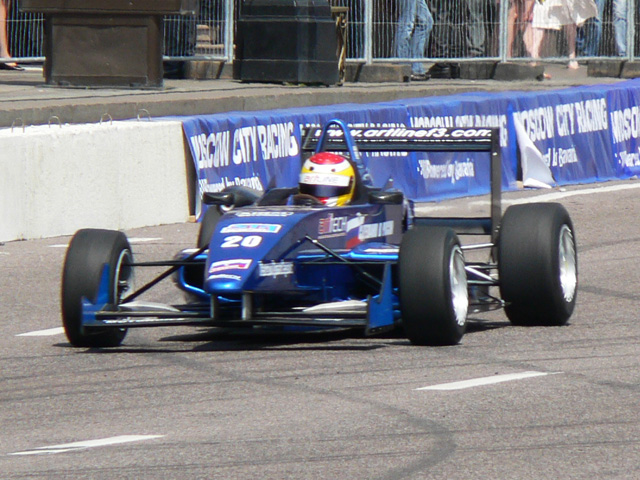
Ivan Samarin driving ArtTech F24 car at Moscow City Racing 2008 show

Russian Formula Three Championship is the name of a former Russian Formula Three racing competition. Starting in 1997, the series ended in 2002, it was relaunched in 2008, which lasted one season.

== Champions ==
Season	Championship			ASPAS Cup		
Season	Drivers' Champion	Car	Teams' Champion	Drivers' Champion	Car	Teams' Champion
2008	(Russia) Vladimir Semyonov	ArtTech F24	ArtLine Engineering	No Cup		
2007	Russian Formula 1600 Championship			No Cup		
2006	Russian Formula 1600 Championship			No Cup		
2005	Russian Formula 1600 Championship			No Cup		
2004	Russian Formula 1600 Championship			No Cup		
2003	Russian Formula 1600 Championship			No Cup		
2002	(Italy) Andrea Belicchi	Dallara F399	Lukoil Racing	No Cup		
2001	(Italy) Maurizio Mediani	Dallara F399	ArtLine Engineering	No Cup		
2000	(Italy) Alberto Pedemonte	Dallara F399	Lukoil Racing	No Cup		
1999	(Italy) Alberto Pedemonte	Dallara	Lukoil Racing	No Cup		
1998	(Russia) Viktor Kozankov	Dallara	West Canopus Castrol	(Italy) Alberto Pedemonte	Dallara F397	Lukoil Racing
1997	(Russia) Viktor Kozankov	Dallara	West Canopus Castrol	(Italy) Alberto Pedemonte	Dallara F397	Lukoil Racing
