= Chilean Formula Three Championship =

Car racing series competition in Chile

- Category: Single seaters
- Country: Chile
- Inaugural season: 1972
- Folded: 2019
- Drivers: 24
- Teams: 8
- Constructors: Tito, Crespi, Larroquette
- Engine suppliers: Nissan
- Last Drivers' champion: (Chile) José Luis Riffo
- Last Teams' champion: (Chile) Team Green Bull
- Official website: formula3.cl

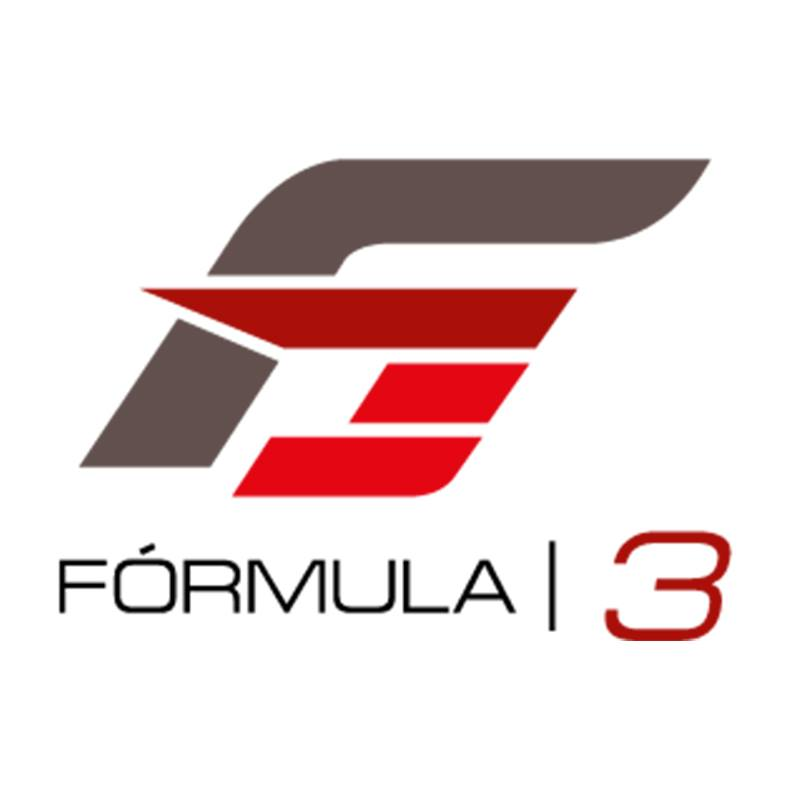
The Chilean Formula 3 Logo

The Chilean Formula Three Championship is an open-wheel racing series competition in Chile.

The cars must have a chassis (monocoque or tubular steel frame) manufactured domestically, Nissan GA15S/GA15DS engine and a 4-speed transmission (reverse gear optional). The displacement of the carbureted engines may be increased up to 1600cc.

From 1972, The Chilean Formula Three Championship did not follow at any time, any of the FIA rules, for chassis or engine, and by the way, cannot be considered as a "Formula Three" championship.

== Champions ==
Season	Champion	Team Champion	Car
1972	(Chile) José Manuel Salinas	?	Salinas-Fiat
1973	(Chile) Juan Carlos Silva	?	?
1974	(Chile) Juan Carlos Silva	?	?
1975	NOT HELD		
1976	(Chile) Juan Carlos Silva	?	?
1977	(Chile) Juan Carlos Silva	?	?
1978	(Chile) Juan Carlos Ridolfi	Ridolfi Competicion	?
1979	(Chile) Santiago Bengolea	Team Marlboro-Chiletabacos	Renault 4S 1.020 c.c.
1980	(Chile) Juan Carlos Ridolfi	Viceroy Racing Team-Chiletabacos	Renault 4S 1.020 c.c.
1981	(Chile) Sergio Santander	Viceroy Racing Team-Chiletabacos	Renault 4S 1.020 c.c.
1982	(Chile) Juan Carlos Ridolfi	Viceroy Racing Team-Chiletabacos	Renault 4S 1.020 c.c.
1983	(Chile) Kurt Horta	Viceroy Racing Team-Chiletabacos	Renault 4S 1.020 c.c.
1984	(Chile) Kurt Horta	Viceroy Racing Team-Chiletabacos	Renault 12 1.400 c.c.
1985	(Chile) Giuseppe Bacigalupo	Team John Player Special-Chiletabacos	Tulia-Renault
1986	(Chile) Giuseppe Bacigalupo	Team John Player Special-Chiletabacos	Tulia-Renault
1987	(Chile) Giuseppe Bacigalupo	Viceroy Racing Team-Chiletabacos	Renault 9 1.400 c.c.
1988	(Chile) Giuseppe Bacigalupo	Team Remolques Goren-Transportes Ferretti	Renault 12 1.400 c.c.
1989	(Chile) Santiago Bengolea	Team Kodak-Gillette Atra Plus-Goodyear	Renault 12 1.400 c.c.
1990	(Chile) Kurt Horta	Team Remolques Goren	Renault 12 1.400 c.c.
1991	(Chile) Giuseppe Bacigalupo	Equipo Marlboro-Shell-Alfa Romeo	Alfa Romeo 33 1.400 c.c.
1992	(Chile) Giuseppe Bacigalupo	Equipo Marlboro-Shell-Alfa Romeo	Alfa Romeo 33 1.400 c.c.
1993	(Chile) Giuseppe Bacigalupo	Equipo Rosen Alfa Romeo	Alfa Romeo 33 1.400 c.c.
1994	(Chile) Ramón Ibarra	Team Valvoline-Jeans One Way-Covial	Renault 12 1.400 c.c.
1995	(Chile) Ramón Ibarra	Team Valvoline-Diario El Mercurio	Renault 12 1.400 c.c.
1996	(Chile) Ramón Ibarra	Team Valvoline-Diario El Mercurio	Renault 12 1.400 c.c.
1997	(Chile) Ramón Ibarra	Team Valvoline-Diario El Mercurio-Epson	Renault 12 1.400 c.c.
1998	(Chile) Mauricio Perrot	Team Castrol-Transportes Perrot	Renault 12 1.400 c.c.
1999	(Chile) Cristobal Ibarra	Team Valvoline	Renault 12 1.400 c.c.
2000	(Chile) Matías Horta	Team Lubricantes Castrol	Renault 12 1.400 c.c.
2001	(Chile) Giuseppe Bacigalupo	Team B&M Security Systems-Lubricantes Castrol	Renault 12 1.400 c.c.
2002	(Chile) Giuseppe Bacigalupo	Team B&M Security Systems-Lubricantes Castrol	Renault 12 1.400 c.c.
2003	(Chile) Cristobal Puig	Team Puig-Motel Real-Zirotti Rectificacion	Renault 12 1.400 c.c.
2004	(Chile) Giuseppe Bacigalupo	B&M Security Systems-Castrol-Bacigalupo Competición	Nissan V16 1.500 c.c.
2005	(Chile) Benjamín Moreau	(Argentina) Basco Racing Team	Crespi-Nissan
2006	(Chile) José Luis Riffo	(Chile) Kano Pro Racing-Liqui Moly	Larroquette-Nissan
2007	(Chile) José Luis Riffo	(Chile) Kano Pro Racing	Larroquette-Nissan
2008	(Argentina) Juan Manuel Basco Jr.	(Argentina) Basco Racing Team	Tito-Nissan
2009	(Chile) Javier Barrales	(Chile) Scuncio Pro Racing - Main Maestranza	Tito-Nissan
2010	(Chile) Juan Carlos Carbonell	(Chile) Carbonell-Cornejo Competicion	Tulia 27-Nissan
2011	(Chile) Pablo Donoso	(Chile) Kem Xtreme	?
2012	(Chile) José Luis Riffo	(Chile) Team Green Bull	Tulia 25-Nissan
2013-2015	NOT HELD		
2016	(Chile) Alex Renner	(Chile) TyT Competicion	Silva F3-Nissan
2017	(Chile) José Luis Riffo	Team Green Bull	Tito 02 - Nissan V16
2018	(Chile) Lucas Bacigalupo	B&M Security Systema - Bacigalupo-Serrano Competición	Tito 02 - Nissan V16
2019	(Chile) Giovanni Ramirez	Bacigalupo-Serrano Competición	Tulia 25 - Nissan V16

== Titles by driver ==
Driver	Titles
(Chile) Giuseppe Bacigalupo	10
(Chile) Juan Carlos Silva	4
(Chile) Ramón Ibarra	4
(Chile) José Luis Riffo	4
(Chile) Juan Carlos Ridolfi	3
(Chile) Kurt Horta	3
(Chile) Santiago Bengolea	2
(Chile) José Manuel Salinas	1
(Chile) Sergio Santander	1
(Chile) Mauricio Perrot	1
(Chile) Cristobal Ibarra	1
(Chile) Matías Horta	1
(Chile) Cristobal Puig	1
(Chile) Benjamin Moreau	1
(Argentina) Juan Manuel Basco Jr.	1
(Chile) Javier Barrales	1
(Chile) Juan Carlos Carbonell	1
(Chile) Pablo Donoso	1
(Chile) Alex Renner	1
(Chile) Lucas Bacigalupo	1
(Chile) Giovanni Ramírez	1
