= Formula Beat =

Single-seater racing championship

- Category: Single seaters
- Country: Japan
- Inaugural season: 1993
- Tyre suppliers: Yokohama (2008–2011); Dunlop (2012–present)
- Drivers' champion: (Japan) "KAMIKAZE"
- Official website: Formula 4

Formula Beat, known as JAF Japan Formula 4 (JAF 地方選手権 F4, JAF Chihou Senshuken) until its rebranding in 2023, is a formula racing class in Japan. The class was founded in 1993 by the Japan Automobile Federation as a class above FJ1600 and below the former All-Japan Formula Three Championship and the current Formula Regional Japanese Championship and Super Formula Lights.

== Car ==
Formula Beat is an open chassis class, open for all chassis manufacturers. Since 2012 the engines have been limited to a maximum capacity of 2,000cc. Currently the cars are allowed to be fitted with a Honda K20A, Toyota 3ZR or Nissan SR20 engine. In the early 2010s, most cars were primarily built by Japanese constructor West Racing Cars, but the championship has since seen entries from older Dallara-built Formula 3 cars and Tatuus chassis.

== Champions ==
=== 1993-1996 ===
Season	Suzuka Champion	TI Champion	Tsukuba (1993-96)/Mine Champion	Super F4 Champion
1993	(Japan) Ryō Michigami	(Japan) Ryō Michigami	Not held	Not held
1994	(Japan) Hiroshi Sasaki	(Japan) Yutaka Okano	Not held	Not held
1995	(Japan) Shōta Mizuno	(Japan) Tatsuya Mizutani	(Japan) Yasuhisa Fujiwara	Not held
1996	(Japan) Tsuyoshi Takahashi	(Japan) Ryōhei Sakaguchi	(Japan) Takaya Tsubobayashi	Not held
1997	(Japan) Yūsuke Matsuura	(Japan) Akihiro Asai	(Japan) Seiji Yoshimura	Not held
1998	(Japan) Kōta Sasaki	(Japan) Naoki Yokobayashi	(Japan) Kōta Sasaki	(Japan) Naoki Yokobayashi
1999	Not held		(Japan) Hideki Nishimura	(Japan) Takeshi Ohtani
2000	Not held		(Japan) Shun Nakamura	(Japan) Takahiro Ogawa

=== 1997-present ===
Season	Kantō Champion	Kansai Champion	All-Japan Final Winner
1997	(Japan) Akihiro Asai	N/A	Not held
1998	(Japan) Takeyuki Kishi	N/A	Not held
1999	(Japan) Touya Higuchi	(Japan) Keita Sawa	Not held
2000	(Japan) Issei Nishio	(Japan) Hideaki Nakao	Not held
2001	(Japan) Naohiro Kawano	(Japan) Kenji Kanehisa	Not held
2002	(Japan) Tetsuya Fujisawa	(Japan) Katsumasa Katayose	Not held
2003	(Japan) Kei Idaka	(Japan) Kenji Ōtaki	Not held
Season	East Champion	West Champion	All-Japan Final Winner
2004	(Japan) Masanobu Katō	(Japan) Koudai Tsukakoshi	Not held
2005	(Japan) Satoru Okada	(Japan) Masaki Tanaka	Not held
2006	(Japan) Muneyuki Kurihara	(Japan) Taku Ikeda	(Japan) Muneyuki Kurihara
2007	(Japan) Kei Idaka	(Japan) Yoshinari Tomimoto	(Japan) Masanobu Katō
2008	(Japan) Yūsuke Tsuchiya	(Japan) Shōta Hanaoka	(Japan) Shōta Hanaoka
2009	(Japan) Tsubasa Kondō	(Japan) Shōta Hanaoka	(Japan) Shōta Hanaoka
2010	(Japan) Makoto Kanai	(Japan) Naoki Nishimoto	(Japan) Hiroki Yoshida
2011	(Japan) Yuhi Sekiguchi	(Japan) Ryō Hirakawa	(Japan) Naoki Nishimoto
2012	(Japan) Ryōsuke Takehira	(Japan) Kosuke Hattori	(Japan) Masayoshi Nakayama
2013	(Japan) Kenta Yamashita	(Japan) Shintarō Kawabata	(Japan) Keishi Ishikawa
2014	(Japan) Yuichi Mikasa	(Japan) Yūya Hiraki	(Japan) Takahiro Ban
2015	(Japan) Tadasuke Makino	(Japan) Tadasuke Makino	(Japan) Tadasuke Makino
2016	(Japan) Toshiki Ōyu	(Japan) Toshiki Ōyu	(Japan) Toshiki Ōyu
2017	(Japan) Yūki Tsunoda	(Japan) Keisuke Ohara	(Japan) Yūki Tsunoda
2018	(Japan) Makoto Kanai	(Japan) Norio Kubo	(Japan) Kakunoshin Ohta
Champion			All-Japan Final Winner
2019	(Japan) Kōhei Tokumasu		(Japan) Kakunoshin Ohta
2020	(Japan) Isao Nakajima		(Japan) Tatsuya Ōta
2021	(Japan) Seiya Motojima		(Japan) Satoshi Katō
2022	(Japan) Itsuki Satō		Not held
2023	(Japan) Kōta Sasaki		Not held
2024	(Japan) Hammer Izawa		Not held
2025	(Japan) Shōta Sakai		Not held
2026	(Japan) "KAMIKAZE"		Not held
