= List of 2006 motorsport champions =

2006 motorsport champions
Previous: 2005	Next: 2007

This list of 2006 motorsport champions is a list of national or international auto racing series with a Championship decided by the points or positions earned by a driver from multiple races.

== Air racing ==
Series	Pilot	refer
Red Bull Air Race World Series	(United States) Kirby Chambliss	2006 Red Bull Air Race World Series

== Dirt oval racing ==
Series	Champion	Refer
Lucas Oil Late Model Dirt Series	(United States) Earl Pearson Jr.	
World of Outlaws Late Model Series	(United States) Tim McCreadie	
World of Outlaws Sprint Car Series	(United States) Donny Schatz	
World of Outlaws Sprint Car Series	Teams: (United States) Donny Schatz Motorsports	

== Drag racing ==
Series	Champion	Refer
NHRA Powerade Drag Racing Series	Top Fuel: (United States) Tony Schumacher	2006 NHRA Powerade Drag Racing Series season
NHRA Powerade Drag Racing Series	Funny Car: (United States) John Force	2006 NHRA Powerade Drag Racing Series season
NHRA Powerade Drag Racing Series	Pro Stock: (United States) Jason Line	2006 NHRA Powerade Drag Racing Series season
NHRA Powerade Drag Racing Series	Pro Stock Motorcycle: (United States) Andrew Hines	2006 NHRA Powerade Drag Racing Series season

== Drifting ==
Series	Champion	Refer
D1 Grand Prix	(Japan) Nobushige Kumakubo	2006 D1 Grand Prix series
D1 Grand Prix	D1SL: (Japan) Takashi Hagisako	2006 D1 Grand Prix series
D1NZ	(New Zealand) Daniel Woolhouse	2006 D1NZ season
D1 Great Britain	(United Kingdom) Phil Morrison	2006 D1 Great Britain
D1 Malaysia	(Malaysia) Tengku Djan Ley	2006 D1 Malaysia
Formula D	(Sweden) Samuel Hübinette	2006 Formula D season

== Karting ==
Series	Driver	Season article
Karting World Championship	FA: (Italy) Davide Forè	
CIK-FIA Karting European Championship	FA: (Italy) Marco Ardigò	
CIK-FIA Karting European Championship	S-ICC: (Italy) Roberto Toninelli	
CIK-FIA Karting European Championship	ICA: (Italy) Nicola Nolé	
CIK-FIA Karting European Championship	ICA-J: (Spain) Miki Monrás	
Rotax Max Challenge	DD2: (Australia) Ben George	
Rotax Max Challenge	MAX: (Netherlands) Ricardo Romkema	
Rotax Max Challenge	MAX Masters: (Canada) Luc Sauriol	
Rotax Max Challenge	Junior: (Netherlands) Jorrit Pex	
Rotax Max Challenge	Nations Cup: United Kingdom	

== Motorcycle ==
Series	Rider	Season article
MotoGP World Championship	(United States) Nicky Hayden	2006 Grand Prix motorcycle racing season
250cc World Championship	(Spain) Jorge Lorenzo	2006 Grand Prix motorcycle racing season
125cc World Championship	(Spain) Álvaro Bautista	2006 Grand Prix motorcycle racing season
Superbike World Championship	(Australia) Troy Bayliss	2006 Superbike World Championship season
Supersport World Championship	(France) Sébastien Charpentier	2006 Supersport World Championship season
Speedway World Championship	(Australia) Jason Crump	2006 Speedway Grand Prix
AMA Superbike Championship	(United States) Ben Spies	2006 AMA Superbike Championship season
Australian Superbike Championship	(Australia) Jamie Stauffer	

== Open wheel racing ==
Series	Driver	Season article
FIA Formula One World Championship	(Spain) Fernando Alonso	2006 Formula One World Championship
FIA Formula One World Championship	Constructors: (France) Renault	2006 Formula One World Championship
GP2 Series	(United Kingdom) Lewis Hamilton	2006 GP2 Series
GP2 Series	Teams: (France) ART Grand Prix	2006 GP2 Series
IndyCar Series	(United States) Sam Hornish Jr.	2006 IndyCar Series
IndyCar Series	Rookies: (United States) Marco Andretti	2006 IndyCar Series
Champ Car World Series	(France) Sébastien Bourdais	2006 Champ Car season
Champ Car World Series	Nations: France	2006 Champ Car season
Champ Car World Series	Rookies: (Australia) Will Power	2006 Champ Car season
A1 Grand Prix	A1 Team France (Alexandre Prémat/Nicolas Lapierre)	2005–06 A1 Grand Prix season
Atlantic Championship	(France) Simon Pagenaud	2006 Atlantic Championship season
Indy Pro Series	(United Kingdom) Jay Howard	2006 Indy Pro Series season
Formula Palmer Audi	(United Kingdom) Jon Barnes	2006 Formula Palmer Audi
Formula Palmer Audi	Autumn Trophy: (United States) Dane Cameron	2006 Formula Palmer Audi
Formula Nippon Championship	(France) Benoît Tréluyer	2006 Formula Nippon Championship
Formula Nippon Championship	Teams: (Japan) Team Impul	2006 Formula Nippon Championship
Grand Prix Masters	(United States) Eddie Cheever	2006 Grand Prix Masters
Grand Prix Masters	Teams: (United States) Team GPM	2006 Grand Prix Masters
Euroseries 3000	(Italy) Giacomo Ricci	2006 Euroseries 3000 season
Euroseries 3000	Teams: (Italy) FMS International	2006 Euroseries 3000 season
F3000 International Masters	(Czech Republic) Jan Charouz	2006 F3000 International Masters
F3000 International Masters	Teams: (Czech Republic) Charouz Racing System	2006 F3000 International Masters
EuroBOSS Series	(Netherlands) Klaas Zwart	2006 EuroBOSS Series
EuroBOSS Series	Teams: (United Kingdom) Team Ascari	2006 EuroBOSS Series
Formula Challenge Japan	(Japan) Yuhi Sekiguchi	2006 Formula Challenge Japan
Formula Lista Junior	(Austria) Gerhard Tweraser	2006 Formula Lista Junior season
Formula Lista Junior	Teams: (Austria) Neuhauser Racing	2006 Formula Lista Junior season
Formula Maruti	(India) Thrivikraman Seshachalam	2006 Formula Maruti season
Formula RUS	(Russia) Kirill Ovcharenko	
JAF Japan Formula 4	East: (Japan) Muneyuki Kurihara	2006 JAF Japan Formula 4
JAF Japan Formula 4	West: (Japan) Taku Ikeda	2006 JAF Japan Formula 4
Formula Toyota	(Japan) Yuhi Sekiguchi	2006 Formula Toyota season
Historic Formula One Championship	(United Kingdom) Steve Hartley	2006 Historic Formula One Championship
Russian Formula 1600 Championship	(Russia) Ivan Samarin	2006 Russian Formula 1600 Championship
Russian Formula 1600 Championship	Teams: (Russia) Lukoil Racing	2006 Russian Formula 1600 Championship
Star Mazda Championship	(United States) Adrian Carrio	2006 Star Mazda Championship
Formula Three
Formula 3 Euro Series	(United Kingdom) Paul di Resta	2006 Formula 3 Euro Series season
Formula 3 Euro Series	Teams: (France) ASM Formule 3	2006 Formula 3 Euro Series season
Formula 3 Euro Series	Rookie: (Japan) Kamui Kobayashi	2006 Formula 3 Euro Series season
Formula 3 Euro Series	Nation: Japan	2006 Formula 3 Euro Series season
Asian Formula Three Championship	(United Kingdom) James Winslow	2006 Asian Formula Three Championship
Asian Formula Three Championship	Teams: (Philippines) JA Motorsport	2006 Asian Formula Three Championship
British Formula 3 Championship	(United Kingdom) Mike Conway	2006 British Formula 3 season
British Formula 3 Championship	National: (Venezuela) Rodolfo González	2006 British Formula 3 season
Chilean Formula Three Championship	(Chile) José Luis Riffo	2006 Chilean Formula Three Championship
Finnish Formula Three Championship	(Finland) Arto Taimi	2006 Finnish Formula Three Championship
Finnish Formula Three Championship	Teams: (Finland) TCB Racing	2006 Finnish Formula Three Championship
German Formula Three Championship	(China) Ho-Pin Tung	2006 German Formula Three season
German Formula Three Championship	Trophy: (Latvia) Harald Schlegelmilch	2006 German Formula Three season
German Formula Three Championship	Rookie: (Latvia) Harald Schlegelmilch	2006 German Formula Three season
All-Japan Formula Three Championship	(Germany) Adrian Sutil	2006 Japanese Formula 3 Championship
All-Japan Formula Three Championship	Teams: (Japan) TOM'S	2006 Japanese Formula 3 Championship
Italian Formula Three Championship	(Italy) Mauro Massironi	2006 Italian Formula Three season
Italian Formula Three Championship	Trofeo: (Italy) Imeiro Brigliadori	2006 Italian Formula Three season
Spanish Formula Three Championship	(Argentina) Ricardo Risatti	2006 Spanish Formula Three season
Spanish Formula Three Championship	Copa de España: (Spain) Germán Sánchez	2006 Spanish Formula Three season
Spanish Formula Three Championship	Teams: (Spain) Racing Engineering	2006 Spanish Formula Three season
Spanish Formula Three Championship	Trofeo Ibérico: (Spain) Roldán Rodríguez	2006 Spanish Formula Three season
Australian Drivers' Championship	(United Kingdom) Ben Clucas	2006 Australian Drivers' Championship
Australian Drivers' Championship	National: (Australia) Ricky Occhipinti	2006 Australian Drivers' Championship
Formula Three Sudamericana	(Brazil) Luiz Razia	2006 Formula 3 Sudamericana season
Formula Three Sudamericana	Light: (Brazil) Caio Costa	2006 Formula 3 Sudamericana season
Formula Renault
Formula Renault 3.5 Series	(Sweden) Alx Danielsson	2006 Formula Renault 3.5 Series
Formula Renault 3.5 Series	Teams: (Austria) Interwetten.com	2006 Formula Renault 3.5 Series
Formula V6 Asia by Renault Series	(India) Karun Chandhok	2006 Formula V6 Asia by Renault Series
Formula V6 Asia by Renault Series	Teams: (South Korea) Team E-Rain	2006 Formula V6 Asia by Renault Series
Eurocup Formula Renault 2.0	(Portugal) Filipe Albuquerque	2006 Eurocup Formula Renault 2.0 season
Eurocup Formula Renault 2.0	(Italy) JD Motorsport	2006 Eurocup Formula Renault 2.0 season
Formula Renault 2.0 Northern European Cup	(Portugal) Filipe Albuquerque	2006 Formula Renault 2.0 Northern European Cup season
Formula Renault 1.6 Argentina	(Argentina) Mariano Werner	2006 Formula Renault 1.6 Argentina
Italian Formula Renault Championship	(Spain) Dani Clos	
Italian Formula Renault Championship	Winter Series: (Spain) Jaime Alguersuari	
Formula BMW
Formula BMW ADAC	(Germany) Christian Vietoris	2006 Formula BMW ADAC season
Formula BMW ADAC	Teams: (Germany) Josef Kaufmann Racing	2006 Formula BMW ADAC season
Formula BMW ADAC	Rookies: (Germany) Jens Klingmann	2006 Formula BMW ADAC season
Formula BMW Asia	(New Zealand) Earl Bamber	
Formula BMW Asia	Teams: (Malaysia) Team Meritus	
Formula BMW UK	(Republic of Ireland) Niall Breen	2006 Formula BMW UK season
Formula BMW UK	Teams: (United Kingdom) Fortec Motorsport	2006 Formula BMW UK season
Formula BMW USA	(Canada) Robert Wickens	
Formula BMW USA	Teams: (United States) EuroInternational	
Formula Ford
Australian Formula Ford Championship	(Australia) John Martin	2006 Australian Formula Ford Championship
Benelux Formula Ford Championship	(Netherlands) Michel Florie	2006 Benelux Formula Ford Championship
British Formula Ford Championship	(United Kingdom) Nathan Freke	2006 British Formula Ford Championship
Dutch Formula Ford Championship	(Netherlands) Michel Florie	2006 Dutch Formula Ford Championship
Formula Ford 2000 Championship Series	(United States) J. R. Hildebrand	2006 Formula Ford 2000 Championship Series
New Zealand Formula Ford Championship	(New Zealand) Shane van Gisbergen	2005–06 New Zealand Formula Ford Championship
Pacific F2000 Championship	(United States) Robert Podlesni	2006 Pacific F2000 Championship

== Rallying ==
Series	Driver/Co-Driver	Season article
World Rally Championship	(France) Sébastien Loeb	2006 World Rally Championship
World Rally Championship	Co-Drivers: (Monaco) Daniel Elena	2006 World Rally Championship
World Rally Championship	Manufacturers: (United States) Ford	2006 World Rally Championship
Junior World Rally Championship	(Sweden) Patrik Sandell	2006 World Rally Championship
Production World Rally Championship	(Qatar) Nasser Al-Attiyah	2006 World Rally Championship
African Rally Championship	(Belgium) Patrick Emontspool	2006 African Rally Championship
Asia-Pacific Rally Championship	(Australia) Cody Crocker	2006 Asia-Pacific Rally Championship
Asia-Pacific Rally Championship	Co-Drivers: (Australia) Benjamin Atkinson	2006 Asia-Pacific Rally Championship
Australian Rally Championship	(Australia) Simon Evans	2006 Australian Rally Championship
Australian Rally Championship	Co-Drivers: (Australia) Sue Evans	2006 Australian Rally Championship
British Rally Championship	(United Kingdom) Mark Higgins	2006 British Rally Championship
British Rally Championship	Co-Drivers: (Republic of Ireland) Rory Kennedy	2006 British Rally Championship
Canadian Rally Championship	(Canada) Antoine L'Estage	2006 Canadian Rally Championship
Canadian Rally Championship	Co-Drivers: (Canada) Ole Holter	2006 Canadian Rally Championship
Central European Zone Rally Championship	S1600: (Czech Republic) Josef Peták	2006 Central European Zone Rally Championship
Central European Zone Rally Championship	Group N: (Czech Republic) Václav Pech	2006 Central European Zone Rally Championship
Central European Zone Rally Championship	Group A: (Austria) Raimund Baumschlager	2006 Central European Zone Rally Championship
Central European Zone Rally Championship	Historic: (Italy) Vittorio Policante	2006 Central European Zone Rally Championship
Codasur South American Rally Championship	(Argentina) Roberto Sánchez	
Czech Rally Championship	(Czech Republic) Václav Pech	2006 Czech Rally Championship
Czech Rally Championship	Co-Drivers: (Czech Republic) Petr Uhel	2006 Czech Rally Championship
Estonian Rally Championship	(Estonia) Martin Rauam	2006 Estonian Rally Championship
Estonian Rally Championship	Co-Drivers: (Estonia) Kristo Kraag	2006 Estonian Rally Championship
European Rally Championship	(Italy) Giandomenico Basso	2006 European Rally Championship
European Rally Championship	Co-Drivers: (Italy) Mitia Dotta	2006 European Rally Championship
French Rally Championship	(France) Nicolas Vouilloz	
Hungarian Rally Championship	(Hungary) Balázs Benik	
Hungarian Rally Championship	Co-Drivers: (Hungary) István Varga	
Indian National Rally Championship	(India) V. R. Naren Kumar	
Indian National Rally Championship	Co-Drivers: (India) D. Ram Kumar	
Italian Rally Championship	(Italy) Paolo Andreucci	
Italian Rally Championship	Co-Drivers: (Italy) Anna Andreussi	
Italian Rally Championship	Manufacturers: (Italy) Fiat	
Middle East Rally Championship	(Qatar) Nasser Al-Attiyah	
New Zealand Rally Championship	(New Zealand) Richard Mason	2006 New Zealand Rally Championship
New Zealand Rally Championship	Co-Drivers: (New Zealand) Sara Randall	2006 New Zealand Rally Championship
Polish Rally Championship	(Poland) Leszek Kuzaj	
Rally America	(United States) Travis Pastrana	
Romanian Rally Championship	(Romania) Constantin Aur	
Scottish Rally Championship	(United Kingdom) Dave Weston	
Scottish Rally Championship	Co-Drivers: (United Kingdom) Steven Clark	
Slovak Rally Championship	(Poland) Grzegorz Grzyb	
Slovak Rally Championship	Co-Drivers: (Poland) Robert Hundla	
South African National Rally Championship	(South Africa) Enzo Kuun	
South African National Rally Championship	Co-Drivers: (South Africa) Guy Hodgson	
South African National Rally Championship	Manufacturers: (Japan) Toyota	
Spanish Rally Championship	(Spain) Daniel Solà	
Spanish Rally Championship	Co-Drivers: (Spain) Xavier Amigo	

=== Rallycross ===
Series	Driver	Season article
FIA European Rallycross Championship	Div 1: (Sweden) Lars Larsson	
FIA European Rallycross Championship	Div 1A: (Poland) Krzysztof Groblewski	
FIA European Rallycross Championship	Div 2: (Czech Republic) Roman Častoral	
British Rallycross Championship	(United Kingdom) Christopher Evans	

== Sports car and GT ==
Series	Driver	Season article
American Le Mans Series	LMP1: (United Kingdom) Allan McNish; LMP1: (Italy) Rinaldo Capello	2006 American Le Mans Series season
American Le Mans Series	LMP1 Teams: (United States) Audi Sport North America	2006 American Le Mans Series season
American Le Mans Series	LMP2: (Germany) Lucas Luhr; LMP2: (Germany) Sascha Maassen	2006 American Le Mans Series season
American Le Mans Series	LMP2 Teams: (United States) Penske Motorsports	2006 American Le Mans Series season
American Le Mans Series	GT1: (United Kingdom) Oliver Gavin; GT1: (Monaco) Olivier Beretta	2006 American Le Mans Series season
American Le Mans Series	GT1 Teams: (United States) Corvette Racing	2006 American Le Mans Series season
American Le Mans Series	GT2: (Germany) Jörg Bergmeister	2006 American Le Mans Series season
American Le Mans Series	GT2 Teams: (United States) Risi Competizione	2006 American Le Mans Series season
Australian GT Championship	(Australia) Greg Crick	2006 Australian GT Championship
British GT Championship	GT2: (Canada) Chris Niarchos; GT2: (United Kingdom) Tim Mullen	2006 British GT Championship
British GT Championship	GT3: (Russia) Leo Machitski	2006 British GT Championship
British GT Championship	GTC: (United Kingdom) Matt Allison; GTC: (United Kingdom) Jonny Lang	2006 British GT Championship
Le Mans Series	LMP1: (France) Jean-Christophe Boullion; LMP1: (France) Emmanuel Collard	2006 Le Mans Series season
Le Mans Series	LMP1 Teams: (France) Pescarolo Sport	2006 Le Mans Series season
Le Mans Series	LMP2: (Denmark) Juan Barazi; LMP2: (Netherlands) Michael Vergers	2006 Le Mans Series season
Le Mans Series	LMP2 Teams: (France) Barazi-Epsilon	2006 Le Mans Series season
Le Mans Series	GT1: (Portugal) Pedro Lamy; GT1: (Switzerland) Gabriele Gardel; GT1: (Belgium) Vincent Vosse	2006 Le Mans Series season
Le Mans Series	GT1 Teams: (France) Aston Martin Labre	2006 Le Mans Series season
Le Mans Series	GT2: (Germany) Marc Lieb; GT2: (Switzerland) Joël Camathias	2006 Le Mans Series season
Le Mans Series	GT2 Teams: (Italy) Autorlando Sport	2006 Le Mans Series season
Rolex Sports Car Series	DP: (Germany) Jörg Bergmeister	2006 Rolex Sports Car Series season
Rolex Sports Car Series	GT: (United States) Andy Lally; GT: (United States) Marc Bunting	2006 Rolex Sports Car Series season
FIA GT Championship	GT1: (Germany) Michael Bartels; GT1: (Italy) Andrea Bertolini	2006 FIA GT Championship season
FIA GT Championship	GT1 Teams: (Germany) Vitaphone Racing Team	2006 FIA GT Championship season
FIA GT Championship	GT2: (Brazil) Jaime Melo	2006 FIA GT Championship season
FIA GT Championship	GT2 Teams: (Italy) AF Corse	2006 FIA GT Championship season
Porsche Supercup, Porsche Carrera Cup, GT3 Cup Challenge and Porsche Sprint Challenge
Porsche Supercup	(United Kingdom) Richard Westbrook	2006 Porsche Supercup
Porsche Supercup	Teams: (Germany) Jetstream Motorsport	2006 Porsche Supercup
Porsche Carrera Cup Asia	(Hong Kong) Darryl O'Young	2006 Porsche Carrera Cup Asia
Australian Carrera Cup Championship	(New Zealand) Craig Baird	2006 Australian Carrera Cup Championship
Porsche Carrera Cup Brasil	(Brazil) Xandy Negrão	2006 Porsche Carrera Cup Brasil
Porsche Carrera Cup France	(France) Anthony Beltoise	2006 Porsche Carrera Cup France
Porsche Carrera Cup France	Teams: (France) Team Sofrev ASP	2006 Porsche Carrera Cup France
Porsche Carrera Cup Germany	(Germany) Dirk Werner	2006 Porsche Carrera Cup Germany
Porsche Carrera Cup Germany	Teams: (Germany) HP Team Herberth	2006 Porsche Carrera Cup Germany
Porsche Carrera Cup Great Britain	(Republic of Ireland) Damien Faulkner	2006 Porsche Carrera Cup Great Britain
Porsche Carrera Cup Great Britain	Teams: (United Kingdom) Team Parker Racing	2006 Porsche Carrera Cup Great Britain
Porsche Carrera Cup Great Britain	Pro-Am: (United Kingdom) Phil Quaife	2006 Porsche Carrera Cup Great Britain
Porsche Carrera Cup Great Britain	Pro-Am Team: (United Kingdom) Motorbase Performance	2006 Porsche Carrera Cup Great Britain
Porsche Carrera Cup Japan	(Japan) Isao Ihashi	2006 Porsche Carrera Cup Japan
Porsche Carrera Cup Scandinavia	(Sweden) Fredrik Ros	2006 Porsche Carrera Cup Scandinavia
Porsche Carrera Cup Scandinavia	Teams: (Sweden) Flash Engineering	2006 Porsche Carrera Cup Scandinavia

== Stock car racing ==
Series	Driver	Season article
NASCAR Nextel Cup Series	(United States) Jimmie Johnson	2006 NASCAR Nextel Cup Series
NASCAR Nextel Cup Series	Manufacturers: (United States) Chevrolet	2006 NASCAR Nextel Cup Series
NASCAR Busch Series	(United States) Kevin Harvick	2006 NASCAR Busch Series
NASCAR Busch Series	Manufacturers: (United States) Chevrolet	2006 NASCAR Busch Series
NASCAR Craftsman Truck Series	(United States) Todd Bodine	2006 NASCAR Craftsman Truck Series
NASCAR Craftsman Truck Series	Manufacturers: (Japan) Toyota	2006 NASCAR Craftsman Truck Series
NASCAR AutoZone West Series	(United States) Eric Holmes	2006 NASCAR AutoZone West Series
NASCAR Busch East Series	(United States) Mike Olsen	2006 NASCAR Busch East Series
ARCA Re/Max Series	(United States) Frank Kimmel	2006 ARCA Re/Max Series
Desafío Corona	(Mexico) Rogelio López	2006 Desafío Corona season
SCSA Racing Series	(United Kingdom) Oli Playle	2006 SCSA season
Turismo Carretera	(Argentina) Norberto Fontana	2006 Turismo Carretera

== Touring car ==
Series	Driver	Season article
World Touring Car Championship	Overall: (United Kingdom) Andy Priaulx	2006 World Touring Car Championship
World Touring Car Championship	Independents: (Netherlands) Tom Coronel	2006 World Touring Car Championship
World Touring Car Championship	Teams: (Germany) BMW	2006 World Touring Car Championship
ADAC Procar Series	(Belgium) Vincent Radermecker	2006 ADAC Procar Series
ADAC Procar Series	Teams: (Switzerland) Maurer Motorsport	2006 ADAC Procar Series
Asian Touring Car Championship	(Germany) Franz Engstler	2006 Asian Touring Car Championship
Asian Touring Car Championship	Teams: (Germany) Engstler Motorsport	2006 Asian Touring Car Championship
Australian Saloon Car Championship	(Australia) Bruce Heinrich	2006 Australian Saloon Car Championship
British Touring Car Championship	(United Kingdom) Matt Neal	2006 British Touring Car Championship
British Touring Car Championship	Teams: (United Kingdom) Team Halfords	2006 British Touring Car Championship
British Touring Car Championship	Manufacturers: (Spain) SEAT	2006 British Touring Car Championship
British Touring Car Championship	Independents: (United Kingdom) Matt Neal	2006 British Touring Car Championship
British Touring Car Championship	Independents Teams: (United Kingdom) Team Halfords	2006 British Touring Car Championship
BRL V6	(Netherlands) Sandor van Es	2006 BRL V6 season
BRL Light	(Netherlands) Marijn van Kalmthout	2006 BRL Light season
Campeonato Brasileiro de Marcas e Pilotos	(Brazil) Fabio Ebrahim	2006 Campeonato Brasileiro de Marcas e Pilotos
Chevrolet Supercars Middle East Championship	(United Kingdom) Jamie Morrow	2005–06 Chevrolet Supercars Middle East Championship
Danish Touringcar Championship	(Denmark) Casper Elgaard	2006 Danish Touringcar Championship
Deutsche Tourenwagen Masters	(Germany) Bernd Schneider	2006 Deutsche Tourenwagen Masters
Deutsche Tourenwagen Masters	Teams: (Germany) HWA Team I	2006 Deutsche Tourenwagen Masters
Eurocup Mégane Trophy	(Netherlands) Jaap van Lagen	2006 Eurocup Mégane Trophy
Eurocup Mégane Trophy	Teams: (France) Tech 1 Racing	2006 Eurocup Mégane Trophy
Eurocup Mégane Trophy	Junior: (France) Matthieu Lahaye	2006 Eurocup Mégane Trophy
Finnish Touring Car Championship	(Finland) Ari Laivola	
Italian Superturismo Championship	(Italy) Roberto Colciago	2006 Italian Superturismo Championship
Italian Superturismo Championship	Teams: (Italy) SEAT Sport Italia	2006 Italian Superturismo Championship
New Zealand V8 Championship	(New Zealand) Kayne Scott	2005–06 New Zealand V8 season
V8 Supercar Championship Series	(Australia) Rick Kelly	2006 V8 Supercar Championship Series
V8 Supercar Championship Series	Teams: (Australia) HSV Dealer Team	2006 V8 Supercar Championship Series
V8 Supercar Championship Series	Manufacturers: (Australia) Holden	2006 V8 Supercar Championship Series
Fujitsu V8 Supercar Series	(Australia) Adam Macrow	2006 Fujitsu V8 Supercar Series
SEAT Cupra Championship	(United Kingdom) Mat Jackson	2006 SEAT Cupra Championship
Stock Car Brasil	(Brazil) Cacá Bueno	2006 Stock Car Brasil season
Superstars Series	(Italy) Max Pigoli	2006 Superstars Series
Superstars Series	Teams: (Italy) Audi Sport Italia	2006 Superstars Series
TC2000 Championship	(Argentina) Matías Rossi	2006 TC 2000 Championship

== Truck racing ==
Series	Driver	Season article
European Truck Racing Championship	(Spain) Antonio Albacete	2006 European Truck Racing Championship
Fórmula Truck	(Brazil) Renato Martins	2006 Fórmula Truck season
Fórmula Truck	Teams: (Brazil) RM Competições	2006 Fórmula Truck season
Fórmula Truck	Manufacturers: (Germany) Mercedes-Benz	2006 Fórmula Truck season
V8 Ute Racing Series	(Australia) Marcus Zukanovic	2006 V8 Ute Racing Series

== See also ==
- List of motorsport championships
- Auto racing
