= List of 2004 motorsport champions =

2004 motorsport champions
Previous: 2003	Next: 2005

This list of 2004 motorsport champions is a list of national or international auto racing series with a Championship decided by the points or positions earned by a driver from multiple races.

== Air racing ==
Series	Pilot	refer
Red Bull Air Race World Series	(United States) Kirby Chambliss	2004 Red Bull Air Race World Series

== Dirt oval racing ==
Series	Champion	Refer
World of Outlaws Late Model Series	(United States) Scott Bloomquist	
World of Outlaws Sprint Car Series	(United States) Steve Kinser	
World of Outlaws Sprint Car Series	Teams: (United States) Steve Kinser Racing	

== Drag racing ==
Series	Champion	Refer
NHRA Powerade Drag Racing Series	Top Fuel: (United States) Tony Schumacher	2004 NHRA Powerade Drag Racing Series
NHRA Powerade Drag Racing Series	Funny Car: (United States) John Force	2004 NHRA Powerade Drag Racing Series
NHRA Powerade Drag Racing Series	Pro Stock: (United States) Greg Anderson	2004 NHRA Powerade Drag Racing Series
NHRA Powerade Drag Racing Series	Pro Stock Motorcycle: (United States) Andrew Hines	2004 NHRA Powerade Drag Racing Series

== Drifting ==
Series	Champion	Refer
D1 Grand Prix	(Japan) Ryuji Miki	2004 D1 Grand Prix season
D1NZ	(New Zealand) Justin Rood	2004 D1NZ season
D1UK/Autoglym Drift Championship	(United Kingdom) Brett Castle	2004 D1UK/Autoglym Drift Championship
Formula D	(Sweden) Samuel Hübinette	2004 Formula D season

== Karting ==
Series	Driver	Season article
Karting World Championship	FA: (Italy) Davide Forè	
CIK-FIA Karting European Championship	FA: (Netherlands) Nick de Bruijn	
CIK-FIA Karting European Championship	S-ICC: (Italy) Francesco Laudato	
CIK-FIA Karting European Championship	ICA: (France) Kévin Estre	
CIK-FIA Karting European Championship	ICA-J: (Monaco) Stefano Coletti	
Rotax Max Challenge	RM1: (South Africa) Wesleigh Orr	
Rotax Max Challenge	MAX Masters: (France) Sam Ghalleb	
Rotax Max Challenge	Junior: (France) Benjamin Salvatore	

== Motorcycle ==
Series	Rider	Season article
MotoGP World Championship	(Italy) Valentino Rossi	2004 Grand Prix motorcycle racing season
250cc World Championship	(Spain) Daniel Pedrosa	2004 Grand Prix motorcycle racing season
125cc World Championship	(Italy) Andrea Dovizioso	2004 Grand Prix motorcycle racing season
Superbike World Championship	(United Kingdom) James Toseland	2004 Superbike World Championship season
Supersport World Championship	(Australia) Karl Muggeridge	2004 Supersport World Championship season
Speedway World Championship	(Australia) Jason Crump	2004 Speedway Grand Prix
AMA Superbike Championship	(Australia) Mat Mladin	
Australian Superbike Championship	(Australia) Adam Fergusson	

== Open wheel racing ==
Series	Driver	Season article
FIA Formula One World Championship	(Germany) Michael Schumacher	2004 Formula One World Championship
FIA Formula One World Championship	Constructors: (Italy) Ferrari	2004 Formula One World Championship
IndyCar Series	(Brazil) Tony Kanaan	2004 IndyCar Series
IndyCar Series	Manufacturers: (Japan) Honda	2004 IndyCar Series
IndyCar Series	Rookies: (Japan) Kosuke Matsuura	2004 IndyCar Series
Champ Car World Series	(France) Sébastien Bourdais	2004 Champ Car season
Champ Car World Series	Constructors: (United Kingdom) Lola	2004 Champ Car season
Champ Car World Series	Rookies: (United States) A. J. Allmendinger	2004 Champ Car season
World Series by Nissan	(Finland) Heikki Kovalainen	2004 World Series by Nissan season
World Series by Lights	(Serbia and Montenegro) Miloš Pavlović	2004 World Series Lights season
Atlantic Championship	(United States) Jon Fogarty	2004 Atlantic Championship season
Infiniti Pro Series	(Brazil) Thiago Medeiros	2004 Infiniti Pro Series season
Australian Drivers' Championship	(Australia) Neil McFadyen	2004 Australian Drivers' Championship
Australian Drivers' Championship	Silver: (Australia) Ian Peters	2004 Australian Drivers' Championship
Euro Formula 3000	(Netherlands) Nicky Pastorelli	2004 Euro Formula 3000 Series
Formula Nippon Championship	(United Kingdom) Richard Lyons	2004 Formula Nippon Championship
Formula Nippon Championship	Teams: (Japan) Team Impul	2004 Formula Nippon Championship
International Formula 3000 Championship	(Italy) Vitantonio Liuzzi	2004 International Formula 3000 Championship
EuroBOSS Series	(United Kingdom) Scott Mansell	2004 EuroBOSS Series
EuroBOSS Series	Teams: (United Kingdom) Mansell Motorsport	2004 EuroBOSS Series
Historic Formula One Championship	(Portugal) Rodrigo Gallego	2004 Historic Formula One Championship
Formula Palmer Audi	(United Kingdom) Jonathan Kennard	2004 Formula Palmer Audi
Formula Palmer Audi	Autumn Trophy: (United Kingdom) Stephen Young	2004 Formula Palmer Audi
Formula Dream	(Japan) Yasuhiro Takasaki	2004 Formula Dream
Formula König	(Germany) Ronny Wechselberger	2004 Formula König season
Formula König	Teams: (Germany) Böhm Motorsport	2004 Formula König season
Formula Lista Junior	(Latvia) Harald Schlegelmilch	2004 Formula Lista Junior season
Formula Maruti	(India) Gaurav Gill	2004 Formula Maruti season
Formula Toyota	(Japan) Hideto Yasuoka	2004 Formula Toyota season
JAF Japan Formula 4	East: (Japan) Masanobu Katō	2004 JAF Japan Formula 4
JAF Japan Formula 4	West: (Japan) Koudai Tsukakoshi	2004 JAF Japan Formula 4
Star Mazda Championship	(United States) Michael McDowell	2004 Star Mazda Championship
Formula Dodge National Championship	(United States) Marco Andretti	
Formula Dodge National Championship	Masters: (Australia) Chris Wilcox	
Formula Dodge Eastern Championship	(United States) Matt Franc	
Formula Dodge Eastern Championship	Expert: (United States) Daniel Herrington	
Formula Dodge Eastern Championship	Sportsman: (Colombia) Steven Goldstein	
Formula Dodge Eastern Championship	Masters: (United States) R. J. Smith	
Formula Dodge Midwestern Championship	(United States) Revere Greist	
Formula Dodge Midwestern Championship	Expert: (United States) Doug Boyer	
Formula Dodge Midwestern Championship	Sportsman: (United States) Mark Fee	
Formula Dodge Midwestern Championship	Masters: (United States) John Greist	
Formula Dodge Southern Championship	(United States) Marco Andretti	
Formula Dodge Southern Championship	Masters: (United States) John Greist	
Formula Dodge Western Championship	(United States) Harrison Brix	
Formula Dodge Western Championship	Masters: (United States) Quentin Wahl	
Formula Rus	(Russia) Sergey Afanasyev	
Russian Formula 1600 Championship	(Russia) Alexey Pavlovskiy	2004 Russian Formula 1600 Championship
Russian Formula 1600 Championship	Teams: (Russia) Lukoil Racing	2004 Russian Formula 1600 Championship
United States Speedway Series	(United States) Greg Gorden	2004 United States Speedway Series
Formula Three
Formula 3 Euro Series	(United Kingdom) Jamie Green	2004 Formula 3 Euro Series season
Formula 3 Euro Series	Rookie: (France) Franck Perera	2004 Formula 3 Euro Series season
Formula 3 Euro Series	Nation: France	2004 Formula 3 Euro Series season
Asian Formula Three Championship	(Australia) Christian Jones	2004 Asian Formula Three Championship
Asian Formula Three Championship	Teams: (Australia) Christian Jones Motorsport	2004 Asian Formula Three Championship
Australian Formula 3 Championship	(Australia) Karl Reindler	2004 Australian Formula 3 Championship
Australian Formula 3 Championship	Trophy: (Australia) Nic Jordan	2004 Australian Formula 3 Championship
Austria Formula 3 Cup	(Germany) Jan Seyffarth	2004 Austria Formula 3 Cup
Austria Formula 3 Cup	Trophy: (Switzerland) Jürg Felix	2004 Austria Formula 3 Cup
British Formula 3 Championship	(Brazil) Nelson Piquet Jr.	2004 British Formula 3 season
British Formula 3 Championship	National: (United Kingdom) Ryan Lewis	2004 British Formula 3 season
All-Japan Formula Three Championship	(Italy) Ronnie Quintarelli	2004 Japanese Formula 3 Championship
All-Japan Formula Three Championship	Teams: (Japan) Inging	2004 Japanese Formula 3 Championship
Chilean Formula Three Championship	(Chile) Giuseppe Bacigalupo	2004 Chilean Formula Three Championship
Finnish Formula Three Championship	(Finland) Teemu Tanninen	2004 Finnish Formula Three Championship
Finnish Formula Three Championship	Teams: (Finland) Polameri Team	2004 Finnish Formula Three Championship
German Formula Three Championship	(Germany) Bastian Kolmsee	2004 German Formula Three season
German Formula Three Championship	Rookie: (Germany) Bastian Kolmsee	2004 German Formula Three season
Italian Formula Three Championship	(Italy) Matteo Cressoni	2004 Italian Formula Three season
Spanish Formula Three Championship	(Spain) Borja García	2004 Spanish Formula Three season
Spanish Formula Three Championship	Teams: (Spain) Racing Engineering	2004 Spanish Formula Three season
Spanish Formula Three Championship	Trofeo Ibérico: (Spain) Borja García	2004 Spanish Formula Three season
Spanish Formula Three Championship	Copa de España Júnior: (Spain) Javier Villa	2004 Spanish Formula Three season
Formula 3 Sudamericana	(Brazil) Alexandre Sarnes Negrão	2004 Formula 3 Sudamericana season
Formula 3 Sudamericana	Light: (Brazil) Marcos Guerra	2004 Formula 3 Sudamericana season
Formula Renault
Formula Renault V6 Eurocup	(Switzerland) Giorgio Mondini	2004 Formula Renault V6 Eurocup season
Formula Renault V6 Eurocup	Teams: (Italy) EuroInternational	2004 Formula Renault V6 Eurocup season
Formula Renault 2000 Eurocup	(United States) Scott Speed	2004 Formula Renault 2000 Eurocup season
Formula Renault 2000 Eurocup	Teams: (Germany) Motopark Academy	2004 Formula Renault 2000 Eurocup season
Formula Renault 2000 UK	(United Kingdom) Mike Conway	2004 Formula Renault 2000 UK season
Formula Renault 2000 UK	Winter Series: (United Kingdom) Stuart Hall	2004 Formula Renault 2000 UK season
Formula Renault 2000 Germany	(United States) Scott Speed	2004 Formula Renault 2000 Germany season
Renault Speed Trophy F2000	(Switzerland) Nicolas Maulini	2004 Formula Renault seasons
Copa Corona Formula Renault 2000 de America	(Mexico) Homero Richards	2004 Formula Renault seasons
Formula Renault 2000 Brazil	(Brazil) Alexandre Foizer	2004 Formula Renault seasons
Championnat de France FFSA Formule Campus Renault Elf	(France) Jacky Ferré	2004 Formula Renault seasons
Formula Renault 1600 Belgium	(Belgium) Maxime Soulet	2004 Formula Renault seasons
Formula Renault Monza	(Romania) Michael Herck	2004 Formula Renault seasons
Formula Renault Elf 1600 Argentina	(Argentina) Ezequiel Bosio	2004 Formula Renault seasons
Formula TR 1600 Pro Series	(United States) Marco Andretti	2004 Formula Renault seasons
Championnat de France Formula Renault 2000	(France) Patrick Pilet	
Formula Renault BARC	(United Kingdom) Nicky Wilson	
Formula Renault 2000 Italia	(Venezuela) Pastor Maldonado	
Formula Renault 2000 Italia	Winter Series: (Russia) Mikhail Aleshin	
Formula Renault 2000 Netherlands	(Netherlands) Junior Strous	
Formula Renault 2000 Scandinavia	(Denmark) Kasper Andersen	
Formula TR 2000 Pro Series	(United States) Colin Braun	
North American Formula Renault 2000	(Argentina) Martin Ponte	
Asian Formula Renault Challenge	(Japan) Hideaki Nakao	
Asian Formula Renault Challenge	Teams: (China) FRD Team	
Formula Renault 1600 Spain	(Romania) Michael Herck	
Formula Super Renault	(Argentina) Ivo Perabo	
Formula BMW
Formula BMW ADAC	(Germany) Sebastian Vettel	2004 Formula BMW ADAC season
Formula BMW ADAC	Teams: (Germany) ADAC Berlin-Brandenburg	2004 Formula BMW ADAC season
Formula BMW Asia	(Hong Kong) Marchy Lee	2004 Formula BMW Asia season
Formula BMW Asia	Teams: (Malaysia) Team Meritus	2004 Formula BMW Asia season
Formula BMW USA	(Germany) Andreas Wirth	
Formula BMW USA	Teams: (United States) HBR/Powerslide Motorsport	
Formula BMW UK	(United Kingdom) Tim Bridgman	2004 Formula BMW UK season
F. Baviera Junior Cup	(Spain) Arturo Llobell	
Formula Ford
Australian Formula Ford Championship	(Australia) David Reynolds	2004 Australian Formula Ford Championship
Benelux Formula Ford Championship	(Netherlands) Helmert-Jan van der Slik	2004 Benelux Formula Ford Championship
British Formula Ford Championship	(Finland) Valle Mäkelä	2004 British Formula Ford Championship
Dutch Formula Ford Championship	(Netherlands) Michel Florie	2004 Dutch Formula Ford Championship
Formula Ford Zetec Championship Series	(United States) Bobby Wilson	2004 Formula Ford Zetec Championship Series
New Zealand Formula Ford Championship	(New Zealand) Tim Edgell	2003–04 New Zealand Formula Ford Championship
Pacific F2000 Championship	(United States) Brad Jaeger	2004 Pacific F2000 Championship

== Rallying ==
Series	Driver/Co-Driver	Season article
World Rally Championship	(France) Sébastien Loeb	2004 World Rally Championship
World Rally Championship	Co-Drivers: (Monaco) Daniel Elena	2004 World Rally Championship
World Rally Championship	Manufacturer: (France) Citroën	2004 World Rally Championship
Junior World Rally Championship	(Sweden) Per-Gunnar Andersson	2004 World Rally Championship
Production World Rally Championship	(United Kingdom) Niall McShea	2004 World Rally Championship
African Rally Championship	(Zambia) Muna Singh	2004 African Rally Championship
Asia-Pacific Rally Championship	(Malaysia) Karamjit Singh	2004 Asia-Pacific Rally Championship
Asia-Pacific Rally Championship	Co-Drivers: (Malaysia) Allen Oh	2004 Asia-Pacific Rally Championship
Australian Rally Championship	(Australia) Cody Crocker	2004 Australian Rally Championship
Australian Rally Championship	Co-Drivers: (Australia) Greg Foletta	2004 Australian Rally Championship
British Rally Championship	(United Kingdom) David Higgins	2004 British Rally Championship
British Rally Championship	Co-Drivers: (Republic of Ireland) Brian Murphy	2004 British Rally Championship
Canadian Rally Championship	(Canada) Patrick Richard	2004 Canadian Rally Championship
Canadian Rally Championship	Co-Drivers: (Canada) Nathalie Richard	2004 Canadian Rally Championship
Codasur South American Rally Championship	(Peru) Ramón Ferreyros	
Czech Rally Championship	(Czech Republic) Jan Kopecký	2004 Czech Rally Championship
Czech Rally Championship	Co-Drivers: (Czech Republic) Filip Schovánek	2004 Czech Rally Championship
Deutsche Rallye Meisterschaft	(Germany) Matthias Kahle	
Estonian Rally Championship	(Russia) Aleksander Dorossinski	2004 Estonian Rally Championship
Estonian Rally Championship	Co-Drivers: (Russia) Dmitri Balin	2004 Estonian Rally Championship
European Rally Championship	(France) Simon Jean-Joseph	2004 European Rally Championship
European Rally Championship	Co-Drivers: (France) Jack Boyère	2004 European Rally Championship
French Rally Championship	(France) Stéphane Sarrazin	
Hungarian Rally Championship	(Hungary) Tamás Turi	
Hungarian Rally Championship	Co-Drivers: (Hungary) István Kerék	
Indian National Rally Championship	(India) Vikram Mathias	
Indian National Rally Championship	Co-Drivers: (India) Sujith Kumar	
Italian Rally Championship	(Italy) Andrea Navarra	
Italian Rally Championship	Co-Drivers: (Italy) Simona Fedeli	
Italian Rally Championship	Manufacturers: (Japan) Subaru	
Middle East Rally Championship	(United Arab Emirates) Khalid Al Qassimi	
New Zealand Rally Championship	(New Zealand) Chris West	2004 New Zealand Rally Championship
New Zealand Rally Championship	Co-Drivers: (New Zealand) Garry Cowan	2004 New Zealand Rally Championship
Polish Rally Championship	(Poland) Leszek Kuzaj	
Romanian Rally Championship	(Romania) Dan Gîrtofan	
Scottish Rally Championship	(United Kingdom) Raymond Munro	
Scottish Rally Championship	Co-Drivers: (United Kingdom) Stewart Merry	
Slovak Rally Championship	(Slovakia) Tibor Cserhalmi	
Slovak Rally Championship	Co-Drivers: (Slovakia) Martin Krajňák	
South African National Rally Championship	(Belgium) Serge Damseaux	
South African National Rally Championship	Co-Drivers: (South Africa) Robert Paisley	
South African National Rally Championship	Manufacturers: (Japan) Toyota	
Spanish Rally Championship	(Spain) Alberto Hevia	
Spanish Rally Championship	Co-Drivers: (Spain) Alberto Iglesias Pin	

=== Rallycross ===
Series	Driver	Season article
FIA European Rallycross Championship	Div 1: (Sweden) Kenneth Hansen	
FIA European Rallycross Championship	Div 1A: (Netherlands) Ron Snoeck	
FIA European Rallycross Championship	Div 2: (Finland) Jussi Pinomäki	
British Rallycross Championship	(Republic of Ireland) Dermot Carnegie	

== Sports car and GT ==
Series	Driver	Season article
American Le Mans Series	LMP1: (Germany) Marco Werner; LMP1: (Finland) JJ Lehto	2004 American Le Mans Series season
American Le Mans Series	LMP1 Teams: (United States) ADT Champion Racing	2004 American Le Mans Series season
American Le Mans Series	LMP2: (United Kingdom) Ian James	2004 American Le Mans Series season
American Le Mans Series	LMP2 Teams: (United States) Miracle Motorsports	2004 American Le Mans Series season
American Le Mans Series	GTS: (Canada) Ron Fellows; GTS: (United States) Johnny O'Connell	2004 American Le Mans Series season
American Le Mans Series	GTS Teams: (United States) Corvette Racing	2004 American Le Mans Series season
American Le Mans Series	GT: (Germany) Timo Bernhard	2004 American Le Mans Series season
American Le Mans Series	GT Teams: (United States) Alex Job Racing	2004 American Le Mans Series season
British GT Championship	N-GT: (United Kingdom) Jonathan Cocker	2004 British GT Championship
British GT Championship	GT Cup: (Portugal) Ni Amorim; GT Cup: (United Kingdom) Adam Wilcox	2004 British GT Championship
Le Mans Series	LMP1: (United Kingdom) Johnny Herbert; LMP1: (United Kingdom) Jamie Davies	2004 Le Mans Series season
Le Mans Series	LMP1 Teams: (United Kingdom) Audi Sport UK Veloqx	2004 Le Mans Series season
Le Mans Series	LMP2: (Switzerland) Alexander Frei; LMP2: (United Kingdom) Sam Hancock	2004 Le Mans Series season
Le Mans Series	LMP2 Teams: (France) Courage Compétition	2004 Le Mans Series season
Le Mans Series	GTS: (Portugal) Pedro Lamy; GTS: (France) Christophe Bouchut; GTS: (Switzerland) Steve Zacchia	2004 Le Mans Series season
Le Mans Series	GTS Teams: (France) Larbre Compétition	2004 Le Mans Series season
Le Mans Series	GT: (Russia) Roman Rusinov	2004 Le Mans Series season
Le Mans Series	GT Teams: (United Kingdom) Sebah Automotive	2004 Le Mans Series season
Rolex Sports Car Series	DP: (Italy) Max Papis; DP: (United States) Scott Pruett	2004 Rolex Sports Car Series season
Rolex Sports Car Series	SGS: (United States) Andy Lally; SGS: (United States) Marc Bunting	2004 Rolex Sports Car Series season
Rolex Sports Car Series	GT: (United States) Bill Auberlen; GT: (United States) Boris Said	2004 Rolex Sports Car Series season
FIA GT Championship	GT: (Italy) Fabrizio Gollin; GT: (Italy) Luca Cappellari	2004 FIA GT Championship season
FIA GT Championship	GT Teams: (Italy) BMS Scuderia Italia	2004 FIA GT Championship season
FIA GT Championship	N-GT: (Germany) Sascha Maassen; N-GT: (Germany) Lucas Luhr	2004 FIA GT Championship season
FIA GT Championship	N-GT Teams: (Germany) Freisinger Motorsport	2004 FIA GT Championship season
Porsche Supercup, Porsche Carrera Cup, GT3 Cup Challenge and Porsche Sprint Challenge
Porsche Supercup	(Germany) Wolf Henzler	2004 Porsche Supercup
Porsche Supercup	Teams: (Germany) Farnbacher Racing	2004 Porsche Supercup
Porsche Carrera Cup Asia	(Hong Kong) Matthew Marsh	2004 Porsche Carrera Cup Asia
Australian Carrera Cup Championship	(Australia) Alex Davison	2004 Australian Carrera Cup Championship
Porsche Carrera Cup France	(France) James Ruffier	2004 Porsche Carrera Cup France
Porsche Carrera Cup France	Teams: (France) Ruffier Racing	2004 Porsche Carrera Cup France
Porsche Carrera Cup Germany	(Germany) Mike Rockenfeller	2004 Porsche Carrera Cup Germany
Porsche Carrera Cup Germany	Teams: (Germany) UPS Porsche Junior Team	2004 Porsche Carrera Cup Germany
Porsche Carrera Cup Great Britain	(United Kingdom) Richard Westbrook	2004 Porsche Carrera Cup Great Britain
Porsche Carrera Cup Great Britain	Teams: (United Kingdom) Redline Racing	2004 Porsche Carrera Cup Great Britain
Porsche Carrera Cup Japan	(Japan) Masayuki Yamamoto	2004 Porsche Carrera Cup Japan
Porsche Carrera Cup Scandinavia	(Sweden) Robin Rudholm	2004 Porsche Carrera Cup Scandinavia
Porsche Carrera Cup Scandinavia	Teams: (Sweden) Podium Racing	2004 Porsche Carrera Cup Scandinavia

== Stock car racing ==
Series	Driver	Season article
NASCAR Nextel Cup Series	(United States) Kurt Busch	2004 NASCAR Nextel Cup Series
NASCAR Nextel Cup Series	Manufacturers: (United States) Chevrolet	2004 NASCAR Nextel Cup Series
NASCAR Busch Series	(United States) Martin Truex Jr.	2004 NASCAR Busch Series
NASCAR Busch Series	Manufacturers: (United States) Chevrolet	2004 NASCAR Busch Series
NASCAR Craftsman Truck Series	(United States) Bobby Hamilton	2004 NASCAR Craftsman Truck Series
NASCAR Craftsman Truck Series	Manufacturers: (United States) Dodge	2004 NASCAR Craftsman Truck Series
NASCAR Busch North Series	(United States) Andy Santerre	2004 NASCAR Busch North Series
NASCAR West Series	(United States) Mike Duncan	2004 NASCAR West Series
ARCA Re/Max Series	(United States) Frank Kimmel	2004 ARCA Re/Max Series
ASCAR Days of Thunder	(United Kingdom) Stevie Hodgson	2004 Days of Thunder season
Desafío Corona	(Mexico) Carlos Pardo	2004 Desafío Corona season
Turismo Carretera	(Argentina) Omar Martínez	2004 Turismo Carretera

== Touring car ==
Series	Driver	Season article
ADAC Procar Series	(Germany) Claudia Hürtgen	2004 ADAC Procar Series
ADAC Procar Series	Teams: (Germany) Schubert Motors	2004 ADAC Procar Series
Asian Touring Car Championship	(Hong Kong) Ka Chun Lo	2004 Asian Touring Car Championship
Asian Touring Car Championship	Teams: (Hong Kong) 778 Autosport	2004 Asian Touring Car Championship
Australian Saloon Car Series	(Australia) Clint Harvey	2004 Australian Saloon Car Series
British Touring Car Championship	(United Kingdom) James Thompson	2004 British Touring Car Championship
British Touring Car Championship	Teams: (United Kingdom) VX Racing	2004 British Touring Car Championship
British Touring Car Championship	Manufacturers: (United Kingdom) Vauxhall	2004 British Touring Car Championship
British Touring Car Championship	Independent: (United Kingdom) Anthony Reid	2004 British Touring Car Championship
BRL V6	(Netherlands) Donny Crevels	2004 BRL V6 season
Campeonato Brasileiro de Marcas e Pilotos	(Brazil) Rodrigo Navarro	2004 Campeonato Brasileiro de Marcas e Pilotos
Danish Touringcar Championship	(Denmark) Casper Elgaard	2004 Danish Touringcar Championship
Deutsche Tourenwagen Masters	(Sweden) Mattias Ekström	2004 Deutsche Tourenwagen Masters
Deutsche Tourenwagen Masters	Teams: (Germany) Abt Sportsline	2004 Deutsche Tourenwagen Masters
European Touring Car Championship	Overall: (United Kingdom) Andy Priaulx	
European Touring Car Championship	Manufacturers: (Germany) BMW	
European Touring Car Championship	Independents: (Netherlands) Tom Coronel	
Finnish Touring Car Championship	(Finland) Pasi Lähteenmäki	
French Supertouring Championship	(France) Soheil Ayari	
Italian Super Production Championship	(Italy) Adriano de Micheli	
New Zealand V8 Championship	(New Zealand) Andy Booth	2003–04 New Zealand V8 season
Norwegian Touring Car Championship	(Norway) Alf-Aslak Eng	2004 Norwegian Touring Car Championship
Renault Sport Clio Trophy	(Italy) Luca Rangoni	2004 Renault Sport Clio Trophy
Renault Sport Clio Trophy	Teams: (Italy) Autotottoli	2004 Renault Sport Clio Trophy
V8 Supercar Championship Series	(Australia) Marcos Ambrose	2004 V8 Supercar Championship Series
V8 Supercar Championship Series	Teams: (Australia) Stone Brothers Racing	2004 V8 Supercar Championship Series
V8 Supercar Championship Series	Manufacturers: (United States) Ford	2004 V8 Supercar Championship Series
Konica Minolta V8 Supercar Series	(Australia) Andrew Jones	2004 Konica Minolta V8 Supercar Series
SEAT Cupra Championship	(United Kingdom) James Pickford	2004 SEAT Cupra Championship
Stock Car Brasil	(Brazil) Giuliano Losacco	2004 Stock Car Brasil season
Superstars Series	(Italy) Francesco Ascani	2004 Superstars Series
Superstars Series	Teams: (Italy) CAAL Racing	2004 Superstars Series
TC2000 Championship	(Argentina) Christian Ledesma	2004 TC2000 Championship
Clio Cup
Renault Clio Cup UK	(United Kingdom) Paul Rivett	
Renault Clio Cup UK	Winter Series: (United Kingdom) Jonathan Adam	

== Truck racing ==
Series	Driver	Season article
European Truck Racing Championship	Super-Race-Trucks: (Germany) Markus Oestreich	2004 European Truck Racing Championship
European Truck Racing Championship	Race-Trucks: (United Kingdom) Stuart Oliver	2004 European Truck Racing Championship
Fórmula Truck	(Brazil) Beto Monteiro	2004 Fórmula Truck season
Fórmula Truck	Teams: (Brazil) DF Motorsport	2004 Fórmula Truck season
Fórmula Truck	Manufacturers: (United States) Ford	2004 Fórmula Truck season
V8 BRute Racing Series	(Australia) Damien White	2004 V8 BRute Racing Series

== See also ==
- List of motorsport championships
- Auto racing
