= List of 2003 motorsport champions =

2003 motorsport champions
Previous: 2002	Next: 2004

This list of 2003 motorsport champions is a list of national or international auto racing series with a Championship decided by the points or positions earned by a driver from multiple races.

== Air racing ==
Series	Pilot	refer
Red Bull Air Race World Series	(Hungary) Péter Besenyei	2003 Red Bull Air Race World Series

== Dirt oval racing ==
Series	Champion	Refer
World of Outlaws Sprint Car Series	(United States) Steve Kinser	
World of Outlaws Sprint Car Series	Teams: (United States) Steve Kinser Racing	

== Drag racing ==
Series	Champion	Refer
NHRA Powerade Drag Racing Series	Top Fuel: (United States) Larry Dixon	2003 NHRA Powerade Drag Racing Series
NHRA Powerade Drag Racing Series	Funny Car: (United States) Tony Pedregon	2003 NHRA Powerade Drag Racing Series
NHRA Powerade Drag Racing Series	Pro Stock: (United States) Greg Anderson	2003 NHRA Powerade Drag Racing Series
NHRA Powerade Drag Racing Series	Pro Stock Motorcycle: (United States) Geno Scali	2003 NHRA Powerade Drag Racing Series

== Drifting ==
Series	Champion	Refer
D1 Grand Prix	(Japan) Youichi Imamura	2003 D1 Grand Prix season
D1NZ	(New Zealand) Jairus Wharerau	2003 D1NZ season

== Karting ==
Series	Driver	Season article
Karting World Championship	FA: (New Zealand) Wade Cunningham	
CIK-FIA Karting European Championship	FA: (Netherlands) Bas Lammers	
CIK-FIA Karting European Championship	S-ICC: (Italy) Alessandro Manetti	
CIK-FIA Karting European Championship	ICA: (Italy) Nicola Bocchi	
CIK-FIA Karting European Championship	ICA-J: (Italy) Nicholas Risitano	
Rotax Max Challenge	MAX: (South Africa) Cristiano Morgado	
Rotax Max Challenge	Junior: (Spain) Omar Martin	

== Motorcycle ==
Series	Rider	Season article
MotoGP World Championship	(Italy) Valentino Rossi	2003 Grand Prix motorcycle racing season
250cc World Championship	(San Marino) Manuel Poggiali	2003 Grand Prix motorcycle racing season
125cc World Championship	(Spain) Daniel Pedrosa	2003 Grand Prix motorcycle racing season
Superbike World Championship	(United Kingdom) Neil Hodgson	2003 Superbike World Championship season
Supersport World Championship	(Australia) Chris Vermeulen	
Speedway World Championship	(Denmark) Nicki Pedersen	2003 Speedway Grand Prix
AMA Superbike Championship	(Australia) Mat Mladin	
Australian Superbike Championship	(Australia) Craig Coxhell	

== Open wheel racing ==
Series	Driver	Season article
FIA Formula One World Championship	(Germany) Michael Schumacher	2003 Formula One World Championship
FIA Formula One World Championship	Constructors: (Italy) Ferrari	2003 Formula One World Championship
Champ Car World Series	(Canada) Paul Tracy	2003 CART season
Champ Car World Series	Manufacturers: (United Kingdom) Lola	2003 CART season
Champ Car World Series	Rookies: (France) Sébastien Bourdais	2003 CART season
IndyCar Series	(New Zealand) Scott Dixon	2003 IndyCar Series
IndyCar Series	Manufacturers: (Japan) Toyota	2003 IndyCar Series
IndyCar Series	Rookies: (United Kingdom) Dan Wheldon	2003 IndyCar Series
Infiniti Pro Series	(United Kingdom) Mark Taylor	2003 Infiniti Pro Series season
Historic Formula One Championship	(United Kingdom) Mike Wrigley	2003 Historic Formula One Championship
Atlantic Championship	(United States) A. J. Allmendinger	2003 Atlantic Championship season
Australian Drivers' Championship	(New Zealand) Daniel Gaunt	2003 Australian Drivers' Championship
Barber Dodge Pro Series	(Brazil) Leonardo Maia	2003 Barber Dodge Pro Series
Euro Formula 3000 Series	(Brazil) Augusto Farfus	2003 Euro Formula 3000 Series
Formula Nippon Championship	(Japan) Satoshi Motoyama	2003 Formula Nippon Championship
Formula Nippon Championship	Teams: (Japan) Team Impul	2003 Formula Nippon Championship
Formula Volkswagen Germany	(Netherlands) Jaap van Lagen	2003 Formula Volkswagen Germany season
International Formula 3000 Championship	(Sweden) Björn Wirdheim	2003 International Formula 3000 Championship
World Series by Lights	(Argentina) Juan Cruz Álvarez	2003 World Series Lights season
World Series by Nissan	(France) Franck Montagny	2003 World Series by Nissan season
Formula Palmer Audi	(United Kingdom) Ryan Lewis	2003 Formula Palmer Audi
Formula Palmer Audi	Autumn Trophy: (United Kingdom) Jonathan Kennard	2003 Formula Palmer Audi
EuroBOSS Series	(Netherlands) Klaas Zwart	2003 EuroBOSS Series
EuroBOSS Series	Teams: (United Kingdom) Team Ascari	2003 EuroBOSS Series
JAF Japan Formula 4	Kantō: (Japan) Kei Idaka	2003 JAF Japan Formula 4
JAF Japan Formula 4	Kansai: (Japan) Kenji Ōtaki	2003 JAF Japan Formula 4
Formula Dream	(Japan) Hideki Mutoh	2003 Formula Dream
Formula König	(Austria) Franz Kuncic	2003 Formula König season
Formula König	Teams: (Germany) Kern Motorsport	2003 Formula König season
Formula Toyota	(Japan) Kazuki Nakajima	2003 Formula Toyota season
Star Mazda Championship	(Venezuela) Luis Schiavo	2003 Star Mazda Championship
Formula Dodge National Championship	(Brazil) Raphael Matos	
Formula Dodge National Championship	Masters: (Australia) Chris Wilcox	
Formula Dodge Eastern Championship	(United States) Marco Andretti	
Formula Dodge Eastern Championship	Masters: (United States) Mark Patterson	
Formula Dodge Midwestern Championship	(Mexico) Salvador Durán	
Formula Dodge Midwestern Championship	Masters: (United States) John Greist	
Formula Dodge Southern Championship	(United States) Joe D'Agostino	
Formula Dodge Southern Championship	Masters: (United States) John Pew	
Formula Dodge Western Championship	(United States) Ricky Schmidt	
Formula Dodge Western Championship	Masters: (United States) Jim Mashburn	
Skip Barber Challenge	(United States) Matt Franc	
Formula Lista Junior	(Switzerland) Romain Grosjean	2003 Formula Lista Junior season
Formula RUS	(Russia) Yuri Baiborodov	
Russian Formula 1600 Championship	(Russia) Alexander Tyuryumin	2003 Russian Formula 1600 Championship
Russian Formula 1600 Championship	Teams: (Russia) ArtLine Engineering	2003 Russian Formula 1600 Championship
United States Speedway Series	(United States) Mike Koss	2003 United States Speedway Series
Formula Three
Formula 3 Euro Series	(Australia) Ryan Briscoe	2003 Formula 3 Euro Series season
Formula 3 Euro Series	Rookie: (Austria) Christian Klien	2003 Formula 3 Euro Series season
Formula 3 Euro Series	Nation: France	2003 Formula 3 Euro Series season
Asian Formula Three Championship	(Philippines) Pepon Marave	2003 Asian Formula Three Championship
Asian Formula Three Championship	Teams: (Philippines) Kinetic F3 Racing Team	2003 Asian Formula Three Championship
Australian Formula 3 Championship	(Australia) Michael Caruso	2003 Australian Formula 3 Championship
Australian Formula 3 Championship	Trophy Class: (Australia) David Borg	2003 Australian Formula 3 Championship
Austria Formula 3 Cup	(Italy) Diego Romanini	2003 Austria Formula 3 Cup
Austria Formula 3 Cup	Trophy: (Germany) Jörg Sandek	2003 Austria Formula 3 Cup
British Formula 3 Championship	(South Africa) Alan van der Merwe	2003 British Formula Three Championship
British Formula 3 Championship	National: (Venezuela) Ernesto Viso	2003 British Formula Three Championship
All-Japan Formula Three Championship	(Australia) James Courtney	2003 Japanese Formula 3 Championship
All-Japan Formula Three Championship	Teams: (Japan) TOM'S	2003 Japanese Formula 3 Championship
Chilean Formula Three Championship	(Chile) Cristobal Puig	2003 Chilean Formula Three Championship
Finnish Formula Three Championship	(Italy) Andrea Belicchi	2003 Finnish Formula Three Championship
Finnish Formula Three Championship	Teams: (Russia) Lukoil Racing	2003 Finnish Formula Three Championship
German Formula Three Championship	(Brazil) João Paulo de Oliveira	2003 German Formula Three season
German Formula Three Championship	Rookie: (Germany) Sven Barth	2003 German Formula Three season
Italian Formula Three Championship	(Italy) Fausto Ippoliti	2003 Italian Formula Three season
Spanish Formula Three Championship	(Brazil) Ricardo Mauricio	2003 Spanish Formula Three season
Spanish Formula Three Championship	Teams: (Spain) Racing Engineering	2003 Spanish Formula Three season
Spanish Formula Three Championship	Trofeo Ibérico: (Spain) Borja García	2003 Spanish Formula Three season
Spanish Formula Three Championship	Copa de España Júnior: (Argentina) Ricardo Risatti	2003 Spanish Formula Three season
Formula 3 Sudamericana	(Brazil) Danilo Dirani	2003 Formula 3 Sudamericana season
Formula 3 Sudamericana	Light: (Brazil) Rodrigo Ribeiro	2003 Formula 3 Sudamericana season
Formula Renault
Formula Renault V6 Eurocup	(Argentina) José María López	2003 Formula Renault V6 Eurocup
Formula Renault V6 Eurocup	Teams: (France) ARTA-Signature	2003 Formula Renault V6 Eurocup
Formula Renault 2000 Masters	(Argentina) Esteban Guerrieri	2003 Formula Renault 2000 Masters season
Formula Renault 2000 Masters	Teams: (Italy) JD Motorsport	2003 Formula Renault 2000 Masters season
Formula Renault 2000 UK	(United Kingdom) Lewis Hamilton	2003 Formula Renault 2000 UK season
Formula Renault 2000 UK	Winter Series: (United Kingdom) Jay Howard	2003 Formula Renault 2000 UK season
Championnat de France Formula Renault 2000	(France) Loïc Duval	
Formula Renault BARC	(United Kingdom) James Gornall	
Formula Renault 2000 Italia	(France) Franck Perera	
Formula Renault 2000 Italia	Teams: (Italy) Prema Powerteam	
Formula Renault 2000 Italia	Winter Series: (Venezuela) Pastor Maldonado	
Formula Renault 2000 Germany	(United Kingdom) Ryan Sharp	
Formula Renault 2000 Netherlands	(Netherlands) Paul Meijer	
Formula Renault 2000 Scandinavia	(Denmark) Tom Pedersen	
Renault Speed Trophy F2000	(Switzerland) Manuel Benz	
Mexican Formula Renault Championship	(Mexico) Homero Richards	
Formula Renault 2000 Brazil	(Brazil) Allam Khodair	
North American Fran Am 2000 Pro Championship	(Canada) Andrew Ranger	
North American Fran Am 2000 Pro Championship	Winter Series: (United Kingdom) Charles Hall	
Asian Formula Renault Challenge	(Macau) Rodolfo Ávila	
Asian Formula Renault Challenge	Teams: (Macau) Asia Racing Team	
Formula Campus by Renault and Elf	(France) Laurent Groppi	
Formula Renault 1600 Argentina	(Argentina) Maximiliano Merlino	
Formula Renault 1600 Belgium	(Belgium) Jérôme d'Ambrosio	
Formula Junior 1600 Italia powered by Renault	(Italy) Marino Spinozzi	
Formula Junior 1600 Italia powered by Renault	Winter Series: (Italy) Domenico Capuano	
Formula Junior 1600 Spain	(Spain) Juan Antonio del Pino	
North American Fran Am 1600 Pro Championship	(United States) Colin Braun	
Formula Super Renault	(Argentina) Federico Lifschitz	
Formula BMW
Formula BMW ADAC	(Germany) Maximilian Götz	2003 Formula BMW ADAC season
Formula BMW ADAC	Teams: (Germany) ADAC Berlin-Brandenburg	2003 Formula BMW ADAC season
Formula BMW Asia	(China) Ho-Pin Tung	2003 Formula BMW Asia season
Formula BMW Asia	Teams: (Malaysia) Team Meritus	2003 Formula BMW Asia season
F. Baviera Junior Cup	(Uruguay) Juan Cáceres	
Formula Ford
Australian Formula Ford Championship	(Australia) Neil McFadyen	2003 Australian Formula Ford Championship
Benelux Formula Ford Championship	(Netherlands) Michel Florie	2003 Benelux Formula Ford Championship
British Formula Ford Championship	(United Kingdom) Tom Kimber-Smith	2003 British Formula Ford Championship
Dutch Formula Ford Championship	(Netherlands) Nelson van der Pol	2003 Dutch Formula Ford Championship
Formula Ford Zetec Championship Series	(United States) Jonathan Bomarito	2003 Formula Ford Zetec Championship Series
New Zealand Formula Ford Championship	(New Zealand) Jonny Reid	2002–03 New Zealand Formula Ford Championship

== Rallying ==
Series	Driver/Co-Driver	Season article
World Rally Championship	(Norway) Petter Solberg	2003 World Rally Championship
World Rally Championship	Co-Drivers: (United Kingdom) Phil Mills	2003 World Rally Championship
World Rally Championship	Manufacturers: (France) Citroën	2003 World Rally Championship
Junior World Rally Championship	(France) Brice Tirabassi	2003 World Rally Championship
Production World Rally Championship	(United Kingdom) Martin Rowe	2003 World Rally Championship
African Rally Championship	(Spain) Fernando Rueda	2003 African Rally Championship
Asia-Pacific Rally Championship	(Germany) Armin Kremer	2003 Asia-Pacific Rally Championship
Asia-Pacific Rally Championship	Co-Drivers: (Germany) Fred Berssen	2003 Asia-Pacific Rally Championship
Australian Rally Championship	(Australia) Cody Crocker	2003 Australian Rally Championship
Australian Rally Championship	Co-Drivers: (Australia) Greg Foletta	2003 Australian Rally Championship
British Rally Championship	(United Kingdom) Jonny Milner	2003 British Rally Championship
British Rally Championship	Co-Drivers: (United Kingdom) Nicky Beech	2003 British Rally Championship
Canadian Rally Championship	(Canada) Tom McGeer	2003 Canadian Rally Championship
Canadian Rally Championship	Co-Drivers: (Canada) Philip Erickson	2003 Canadian Rally Championship
Czech Rally Championship	(Czech Republic) Václav Pech	2003 Czech Rally Championship
Czech Rally Championship	Co-Drivers: (Czech Republic) Petr Uhel	2003 Czech Rally Championship
Deutsche Rallye Meisterschaft	(Germany) Hermann Gassner Sr.	
Estonian Rally Championship	A>2000: (Estonia) Slava Popov	2003 Estonian Rally Championship
Estonian Rally Championship	A>2000 Co-Drivers: (Estonia) Sergei Larens	2003 Estonian Rally Championship
Estonian Rally Championship	N 2000+: (Estonia) Ivar Raidam	2003 Estonian Rally Championship
Estonian Rally Championship	N 2000+ Co-Drivers: (Estonia) Robert Lepikson	2003 Estonian Rally Championship
European Rally Championship	(Belgium) Bruno Thiry	2003 European Rally Championship
European Rally Championship	Co-Drivers: (Belgium) Jean-Marc Fortin	2003 European Rally Championship
French Rally Championship	(France) Alexandre Bengué	
Hungarian Rally Championship	(Hungary) Balázs Benik	
Hungarian Rally Championship	Co-Drivers: (Hungary) Pál Somogyi	
Indian National Rally Championship	(India) V. R. Naren Kumar	
Indian National Rally Championship	Co-Drivers: (India) D. Ram Kumar	
Italian Rally Championship	(Italy) Paolo Andreucci	
Italian Rally Championship	Co-Drivers: (Italy) Anna Andreussi	
Italian Rally Championship	Manufacturers: (Italy) Fiat	
Middle East Rally Championship	(Qatar) Nasser Al-Attiyah	
New Zealand Rally Championship	(New Zealand) Bruce Herbert	2003 New Zealand Rally Championship
New Zealand Rally Championship	Co-Drivers: (New Zealand) Rob Ryan	2003 New Zealand Rally Championship
Polish Rally Championship	(Poland) Tomasz Czopik	
Romanian Rally Championship	(Romania) Mihai Leu	
Scottish Rally Championship	(United Kingdom) Raymond Munro	
Scottish Rally Championship	Co-Drivers: (United Kingdom) Neil Ewing	
Slovak Rally Championship	(Czech Republic) Václav Pech	
Slovak Rally Championship	Co-Drivers: (Czech Republic) Petr Uhel	
South African National Rally Championship	(Belgium) Serge Damseaux	
South African National Rally Championship	Co-Drivers: (South Africa) Robert Paisley	
South African National Rally Championship	Manufacturers: (Japan) Toyota	
Spanish Rally Championship	(Spain) Miguel Ángel Fuster	
Spanish Rally Championship	Co-Drivers: (Spain) José Vicente Medina	

=== Rallycross ===
Series	Driver	Season article
FIA European Rallycross Championship	Div 1: (Sweden) Kenneth Hansen	
FIA European Rallycross Championship	Div 2: (Czech Republic) Jaroslav Kalný	
FIA European Rallycross Championship	1400 Cup: (Norway) Guttorm Lindefjell	
British Rallycross Championship	(Republic of Ireland) Dermot Carnegie	

== Sports car and GT ==
Series	Driver	Season article
American Le Mans Series	LMP900: (Germany) Frank Biela; LMP900: (Germany) Marco Werner	2003 American Le Mans Series season
American Le Mans Series	LMP675: (United States) Chris Dyson	2003 American Le Mans Series season
American Le Mans Series	GTS: (Canada) Ron Fellows; GTS: (United States) Johnny O'Connell	2003 American Le Mans Series season
American Le Mans Series	GT: (Germany) Lucas Luhr; GT: (Germany) Sascha Maassen	2003 American Le Mans Series season
British GT Championship	GTO: (United Kingdom) Tom Herridge	2003 British GT Championship
British GT Championship	GT Cup: (Republic of Ireland) Matt Griffin; GT Cup: (United Kingdom) Patrick Pearce	2003 British GT Championship
Rolex Sports Car Series	DP: (United States) Terry Borcheller	2003 Rolex Sports Car Series season
Rolex Sports Car Series	SRPII: (United States) Steve Marshall	2003 Rolex Sports Car Series season
Rolex Sports Car Series	GTS: (United States) Tommy Riggins; GTS: (United States) Dave Machavern	2003 Rolex Sports Car Series season
Rolex Sports Car Series	GT: (United States) Cort Wagner; GT: (United States) Brent Martini	2003 Rolex Sports Car Series season
FIA Sportscar Championship	SR1: (Netherlands) Jan Lammers; SR1: (Netherlands) John Bosch	2003 FIA Sportscar Championship season
FIA Sportscar Championship	SR1 Teams: (Netherlands) Racing for Holland	2003 FIA Sportscar Championship season
FIA Sportscar Championship	SR2: (Italy) Mirko Savoldi; SR2: (Italy) Piergiuseppe Peroni	2003 FIA Sportscar Championship season
FIA Sportscar Championship	SR2 Teams: (Italy) Lucchini Engineering	2003 FIA Sportscar Championship season
FIA GT Championship	GT: (Italy) Thomas Biagi; GT: (Italy) Matteo Bobbi	2003 FIA GT Championship season
FIA GT Championship	GT Teams: (Italy) BMS Scuderia Italia	2003 FIA GT Championship season
FIA GT Championship	N-GT: (France) Stéphane Ortelli; N-GT: (Germany) Marc Lieb	2003 FIA GT Championship season
FIA GT Championship	N-GT Teams: (Germany) Freisinger Motorsport	2003 FIA GT Championship season
Porsche Supercup, Porsche Carrera Cup, GT3 Cup Challenge and Porsche Sprint Challenge
Porsche Supercup	(Germany) Frank Stippler	2003 Porsche Supercup
Porsche Supercup	Teams: (Germany) Farnbacher Racing	2003 Porsche Supercup
Porsche Carrera Cup Asia	(Hong Kong) Charles Kwan	2003 Porsche Carrera Cup Asia
Australian Carrera Cup Championship	(New Zealand) Jim Richards	2003 Australian Carrera Cup Championship
Porsche Carrera Cup France	(France) Philippe Gache	2003 Porsche Carrera Cup France
Porsche Carrera Cup France	Teams: (France) Larbre Compétition	2003 Porsche Carrera Cup France
Porsche Carrera Cup Germany	(Germany) Frank Stippler	2003 Porsche Carrera Cup Germany
Porsche Carrera Cup Germany	Teams: (Germany) UPS Porsche Junior Team	2003 Porsche Carrera Cup Germany
Porsche Carrera Cup Great Britain	(United Kingdom) Barry Horne	2003 Porsche Carrera Cup Great Britain
Porsche Carrera Cup Great Britain	Teams: (United Kingdom) Team Parker Racing	2003 Porsche Carrera Cup Great Britain
Porsche Carrera Cup Japan	(Japan) Masayuki Yamamoto	2003 Porsche Carrera Cup Japan

== Stock car racing ==
Series	Driver	Season article
NASCAR Winston Cup Series	(United States) Matt Kenseth	2003 NASCAR Winston Cup Series
NASCAR Winston Cup Series	Manufacturers: (United States) Chevrolet	2003 NASCAR Winston Cup Series
NASCAR Busch Series	(United States) Brian Vickers	2003 NASCAR Busch Series
NASCAR Busch Series	Manufacturers: (United States) Chevrolet	2003 NASCAR Busch Series
NASCAR Craftsman Truck Series	(United States) Travis Kvapil	2003 NASCAR Craftsman Truck Series
NASCAR Craftsman Truck Series	Manufacturers: (United States) Dodge	2003 NASCAR Craftsman Truck Series
NASCAR Busch North Series	(United States) Andy Santerre	2003 NASCAR Busch North Series
NASCAR Winston West Series	(United States) Scott Lynch	2003 NASCAR Winston West Series
ARCA Re/Max Series	(United States) Frank Kimmel	2003 ARCA Re/Max Series
ASCAR Racing Series	(United Kingdom) Ben Collins	2003 ASCAR season
Turismo Carretera	(Argentina) Ernesto Bessone	2003 Turismo Carretera

== Touring car ==
Series	Driver	Season article
ADAC Procar Series	(Germany) Claudia Hürtgen	2003 ADAC Procar Series
ADAC Procar Series	Teams: (Germany) Schubert Motors	2003 ADAC Procar Series
Asian Touring Car Championship	(Hong Kong) Gary Sham Gai Tong	2003 Asian Touring Car Championship
Asian Touring Car Championship	Teams: (Hong Kong) 3 Crowns Racing	2003 Asian Touring Car Championship
Australian Saloon Car Series	(Australia) Bruce Heinrich	2003 Australian Saloon Car Series
British Touring Car Championship	(France) Yvan Muller	2003 British Touring Car Championship
British Touring Car Championship	Teams: (United Kingdom) VX Racing	2003 British Touring Car Championship
British Touring Car Championship	Manufacturers: (United Kingdom) Vauxhall	2003 British Touring Car Championship
British Touring Car Championship	Production: (United Kingdom) Luke Hines	2003 British Touring Car Championship
British Touring Car Championship	Production Teams: (United Kingdom) Barwell Motorsport	2003 British Touring Car Championship
British Touring Car Championship	Independent: (United Kingdom) Rob Collard	2003 British Touring Car Championship
Danish Touringcar Championship	(Denmark) Jan Magnussen	2003 Danish Touringcar Championship
Deutsche Tourenwagen Masters	(Germany) Bernd Schneider	2003 Deutsche Tourenwagen Masters
Deutsche Tourenwagen Masters	Teams: (Germany) HWA Team I	2003 Deutsche Tourenwagen Masters
European Touring Car Championship	Overall: (Italy) Gabriele Tarquini	
European Touring Car Championship	Manufacturers: (Germany) BMW	
European Touring Car Championship	Independents: (Netherlands) Duncan Huisman	
Finnish Touring Car Championship	(Finland) Olli Haapalainen	
French Supertouring Championship	(France) Christophe Bouchut	
Italian Super Production Championship	(Italy) Salvatore Tavano	
New Zealand V8 Championship	(New Zealand) Mark Pedersen	2002–03 New Zealand V8 season
Norwegian Touring Car Championship	(Norway) Alf-Aslak Eng	2003 Norwegian Touring Car Championship
Renault Sport Clio Trophy	(Italy) Luca Rangoni	2003 Renault Sport Clio Trophy
Renault Sport Clio Trophy	Teams: (Italy) Autotottoli	2003 Renault Sport Clio Trophy
V8 Supercar Championship Series	(Australia) Marcos Ambrose	2003 V8 Supercar Championship Series
V8 Supercar Championship Series	Teams: (Australia) Stone Brothers Racing	2003 V8 Supercar Championship Series
V8 Supercar Championship Series	Manufacturers: (United States) Ford	2003 V8 Supercar Championship Series
Konica V8 Supercar Series	(Australia) Mark Winterbottom	2003 Konica V8 Supercar Series
SEAT Cupra Championship	(United Kingdom) Robert Huff	2003 SEAT Cupra Championship
Stock Car Brasil	(Brazil) David Muffato	2003 Stock Car Brasil season
TC2000 Championship	(Argentina) Gabriel Ponce de León	2003 TC2000 Championship

== Truck racing ==
Series	Driver	Season article
European Truck Racing Championship	Super-Race-Trucks: (Germany) Gerd Körber	2003 European Truck Racing Championship
European Truck Racing Championship	Race-Trucks: (Germany) Lutz Bernau	2003 European Truck Racing Championship
Fórmula Truck	(Brazil) Wellington Cirino	2003 Fórmula Truck season
Fórmula Truck	Teams: (Brazil) ABF Mercedes-Benz	2003 Fórmula Truck season
V8 BRute Racing Series	(Australia) Warren Luff	2003 V8 BRute Racing Series

== See also ==
- List of motorsport championships
- Auto racing
