= List of 2005 motorsport champions =

2005 motorsport champions
Previous: 2004	Next: 2006

This list of 2005 motorsport champions is a list of national or international auto racing series with a Championship decided by the points or positions earned by a driver from multiple races.

== Air racing ==
Series	Pilot	refer
Red Bull Air Race World Series	(United States) Mike Mangold	2005 Red Bull Air Race World Series

== Dirt oval racing ==
Series	Champion	Refer
Lucas Oil Late Model Dirt Series	(United States) Earl Pearson Jr.	
World of Outlaws Late Model Series	(United States) Billy Moyer Sr.	
World of Outlaws Sprint Car Series	(United States) Steve Kinser	
World of Outlaws Sprint Car Series	Teams: (United States) Steve Kinser Racing	

== Drag racing ==
Series	Champion	Refer
NHRA Powerade Drag Racing Series	Top Fuel: (United States) Tony Schumacher	2005 NHRA Powerade Drag Racing Series season
NHRA Powerade Drag Racing Series	Funny Car: (United States) Gary Scelzi	2005 NHRA Powerade Drag Racing Series season
NHRA Powerade Drag Racing Series	Pro Stock: (United States) Greg Anderson	2005 NHRA Powerade Drag Racing Series season
NHRA Powerade Drag Racing Series	Pro Stock Motorcycle: (United States) Andrew Hines	2005 NHRA Powerade Drag Racing Series season

== Drifting ==
Series	Champion	Refer
D1 Grand Prix	(Japan) Yasuyuki Kazama	2005 D1 Grand Prix season
D1NZ	(New Zealand) Adam Richards	2005 D1NZ season
D1UK/Autoglym Drift Championship	(United Kingdom) Damien Mulvey	2005 D1UK/Autoglym Drift Championship
Formula D	(New Zealand) Rhys Millen	2005 Formula D season

== Karting ==
Series	Driver	Season article
Karting World Championship	FA: (United Kingdom) Oliver Oakes	
CIK-FIA Karting European Championship	FA: (Italy) Marco Ardigò	
CIK-FIA Karting European Championship	S-ICC: (Italy) Francesco Laudato	
CIK-FIA Karting European Championship	ICA: (United Kingdom) James Calado	
CIK-FIA Karting European Championship	ICA-J: (Denmark) Michael Christensen	
Rotax Max Challenge	RM1: (South Africa) Wesleigh Orr	
Rotax Max Challenge	MAX: (Netherlands) Luuk Glansdorp	
Rotax Max Challenge	MAX Masters: (Indonesia) Satya Rasa	
Rotax Max Challenge	Junior: (Estonia) Kenneth Hildebrand	

== Motorcycle ==
Series	Rider	Season article
MotoGP World Championship	(Italy) Valentino Rossi	2005 Grand Prix motorcycle racing season
250cc World Championship	(Spain) Daniel Pedrosa	2005 Grand Prix motorcycle racing season
125cc World Championship	(Switzerland) Thomas Lüthi	2005 Grand Prix motorcycle racing season
Superbike World Championship	(Australia) Troy Corser	2005 Superbike World Championship season
Supersport World Championship	(France) Sébastien Charpentier	
Speedway World Championship	(Sweden) Tony Rickardsson	2005 Speedway Grand Prix
AMA Superbike Championship	(Australia) Mat Mladin	2005 AMA Superbike Championship season
Australian Superbike Championship	(Australia) Josh Brookes	

== Open wheel racing ==
Series	Driver	Season article
FIA Formula One World Championship	(Spain) Fernando Alonso	2005 Formula One World Championship
FIA Formula One World Championship	Constructors: (France) Renault	2005 Formula One World Championship
GP2 Series	(Germany) Nico Rosberg	2005 GP2 Series
GP2 Series	Teams: (France) ART Grand Prix	2005 GP2 Series
IndyCar Series	(United Kingdom) Dan Wheldon	2005 IndyCar Series
IndyCar Series	Manufacturers: (Japan) Honda	2005 IndyCar Series
IndyCar Series	Rookies: (United States) Danica Patrick	2005 IndyCar Series
Champ Car World Series	(France) Sébastien Bourdais	2005 Champ Car season
Champ Car World Series	Nations: France	2005 Champ Car season
Champ Car World Series	Rookies: (Germany) Timo Glock	2005 Champ Car season
Italian Formula 3000	(Italy) Luca Filippi	2005 Italian Formula 3000 season
Italian Formula 3000	Light: (Italy) Stefano Gattuso	2005 Italian Formula 3000 season
Formula Nippon Championship	(Japan) Satoshi Motoyama	2005 Formula Nippon Championship
Formula Nippon Championship	Teams: (Japan) Team Impul	2005 Formula Nippon Championship
3000 Pro Series	(Italy) Max Busnelli	2005 3000 Pro Series
3000 Pro Series	Teams: (Italy) Draco Junior Team	2005 3000 Pro Series
Atlantic Championship	(Netherlands) Charles Zwolsman Jr.	2005 Atlantic Championship season
Infiniti Pro Series	(New Zealand) Wade Cunningham	2005 Infiniti Pro Series season
EuroBOSS Series	(France) Patrick d’Aubreby	2005 EuroBOSS Series
EuroBOSS Series	Teams: (United Kingdom) Team Griffiths/Team Ascari	2005 EuroBOSS Series
Historic Formula One Championship	(Germany) Christian Gläsel	2005 Historic Formula One Championship
Formula Palmer Audi	(United Kingdom) Joe Tandy	2005 Formula Palmer Audi
Formula Palmer Audi	Autumn Trophy: (United Kingdom) Josh Weber	2005 Formula Palmer Audi
Star Mazda Championship	(Brazil) Raphael Matos	2005 Star Mazda Championship
Formula Three
Formula 3 Euro Series	(United Kingdom) Lewis Hamilton	2005 Formula 3 Euro Series season
Formula 3 Euro Series	Teams: (France) ASM Formule 3	2005 Formula 3 Euro Series season
Formula 3 Euro Series	Rookie: (Germany) Sebastian Vettel	2005 Formula 3 Euro Series season
Formula 3 Euro Series	Nation: United Kingdom	2005 Formula 3 Euro Series season
Asian Formula Three Championship	(Indonesia) Ananda Mikola	2005 Asian Formula Three Championship
Asian Formula Three Championship	Teams: (Japan) ThreeBond Racing	2005 Asian Formula Three Championship
British Formula 3 Championship	(Portugal) Álvaro Parente	2005 British Formula 3 season
British Formula 3 Championship	National: (Mexico) Salvador Durán	2005 British Formula 3 season
Chilean Formula Three Championship	(Chile) Benjamín Moreau	2005 Chilean Formula Three Championship
All-Japan Formula Three Championship	(Brazil) João Paulo de Oliveira	2005 Japanese Formula 3 Championship
All-Japan Formula Three Championship	Teams: (Japan) TOM'S	2005 Japanese Formula 3 Championship
German Formula Three Championship	(Germany) Peter Elkmann	2005 German Formula Three Championship
German Formula Three Championship	T: (Germany) Kevin Fank	2005 German Formula Three Championship
German Formula Three Championship	Rookie: (Germany) Pascal Kochem	2005 German Formula Three Championship
Italian Formula Three Championship	(Italy) Luigi Ferrara	2005 Italian Formula Three season
Spanish Formula Three Championship	(Spain) Andy Soucek	2005 Spanish Formula Three season
Spanish Formula Three Championship	Copa de España: (Spain) Arturo Llobell	2005 Spanish Formula Three season
Spanish Formula Three Championship	Teams: (Spain) Racing Engineering	2005 Spanish Formula Three season
Spanish Formula Three Championship	Trofeo Ibérico: (Spain) Andy Soucek	2005 Spanish Formula Three season
Australian Drivers' Championship	(Australia) Aaron Caratti	2005 Australian Drivers' Championship
Australian Drivers' Championship	B: (Australia) Bill Maddocks	2005 Australian Drivers' Championship
Formula 3 Central Europe	(Romania) Michael Herck	
Austrian Formula Three Championship	(Romania) Michael Herck	
Finnish Formula Three Championship	(Finland) Jari Koivisto	2005 Finnish Formula Three Championship
Finnish Formula Three Championship	Teams: (Finland) Jari Koivisto Racing	2005 Finnish Formula Three Championship
Formula Three Sudamericana	(Brazil) Alberto Valerio	2005 Formula 3 Sudamericana season
Formula Three Sudamericana	Light: (Brazil) Paulo Jose Meyer	2005 Formula 3 Sudamericana season
Turkish Formula Three Championship	(Turkey) Cemil Çipa	
Formula Renault
Formula Renault 3.5 Series	(Poland) Robert Kubica	2005 Formula Renault 3.5 Series season
Formula Renault 3.5 Series	Teams: (Spain) Epsilon Euskadi	2005 Formula Renault 3.5 Series season
Eurocup Formula Renault 2.0	(Japan) Kamui Kobayashi	2005 Eurocup Formula Renault 2.0 season
Eurocup Formula Renault 2.0	Teams: (France) SG Formula	2005 Eurocup Formula Renault 2.0 season
Formula Renault 2.0 Germany	(Finland) Pekka Saarinen	2005 Formula Renault 2.0 Germany season
Formula Renault 2.0 UK	(United Kingdom) Oliver Jarvis	2005 Formula Renault 2.0 UK season
Formula Renault 2.0 UK	Winter Series: (Netherlands) Junior Strous	2005 Formula Renault seasons
Formula Renault BARC	(United Kingdom) Nick Wilcox	2005 Formula Renault seasons
Champonnat de France Formula Renault 2.0	(France) Romain Grosjean	2005 Formula Renault seasons
Formula Renault 2.0 Italia	(Japan) Kamui Kobayashi	2005 Formula Renault seasons
Formula Renault 2.0 Italia	Winter Series: (Finland) Atte Mustonen	2005 Formula Renault seasons
Formula Renault 2.0 Netherlands	(Netherlands) Renger van der Zande	2005 Formula Renault seasons
Formula Renault 2.0 Nordic Series	(Denmark) Jesper Wulff Laursen	2005 Formula Renault seasons
Formule Renault 2.0 Suisse	(Switzerland) Ralph Meichtry	2005 Formula Renault seasons
Copa Corona Formula Renault 2000 de America	(Mexico) Germán Quiroga	2005 Formula Renault seasons
Formula Renault 2.0 Brazil	(Brazil) Nelson Merlo	2005 Formula Renault seasons
Formula TR 2000 Pro Series	(United States) Seth Ingham	2005 Formula Renault seasons
Asian Formula Renault Challenge	(Taiwan) Hanss Lin	2005 Formula Renault seasons
Asian Formula Renault Challenge	Teams: (China) Shangsai FRD Team	2005 Formula Renault seasons
Championnat de France Formule Campus Renault Elf La Filiere FFSA	(France) Jean-Karl Vernay	2005 Formula Renault seasons
Formula Junior 1.6 Italia powered by Renault	(Italy) Pasquale Di Sabatino	2005 Formula Renault seasons
Formula Junior 1.6 Italia powered by Renault	Winter Series: (Italy) Davide Ruzzon	2005 Formula Renault seasons
Formula Renault 1.6 Belgium	(Belgium) Pierre Sevrin	2005 Formula Renault seasons
Formula Renault 1.6 Argentina	(Argentina) Lucas Benamo	2005 Formula Renault seasons
Copa Corona Formula Renault Jr. 1600	(Mexico) Picho Toledano	2005 Formula Renault seasons
Formula TR 1600 Pro Series	(United States) Carl Skerlong	2005 Formula Renault seasons
Formula BMW
Formula BMW ADAC	(Germany) Nico Hülkenberg	2005 Formula BMW ADAC season
Formula BMW ADAC	Teams: (Germany) Josef Kaufmann Racing	2005 Formula BMW ADAC season
Formula BMW ADAC	Rookies: (Germany) Nico Hülkenberg	2005 Formula BMW ADAC season
Formula BMW Asia	(Bahrain) Salman Al Khalifa	
Formula BMW Asia	Teams: (Malaysia) Team Meritus	
Formula BMW UK	(United Kingdom) Dean Smith	2005 Formula BMW UK season
Formula BMW UK	Teams: (United Kingdom) Nexa Racing	2005 Formula BMW UK season
Formula BMW USA	(France) Richard Philippe	2005 Formula BMW USA season
Formula BMW USA	Teams: (Canada) Team Autotecnica	2005 Formula BMW USA season
Formula Ford
Australian Formula Ford Championship	(Australia) Daniel Elliott	2005 Australian Formula Ford Championship
Benelux Formula Ford Championship	(Netherlands) Dennis Retera	2005 Benelux Formula Ford Championship
British Formula Ford Championship	(Republic of Ireland) Charlie Donnelly	2005 British Formula Ford Championship
Dutch Formula Ford Championship	(Netherlands) Dennis Retera	2005 Dutch Formula Ford Championship
Formula Ford Zetec Championship Series	(United Kingdom) Jay Howard	2005 Formula Ford Zetec Championship Series
New Zealand Formula Ford Championship	(New Zealand) Shannon O'Brien	2004–05 New Zealand Formula Ford Championship
Pacific F2000 Championship	(United States) Mike Forest	2005 Pacific F2000 Championship
Scottish Formula Ford Championship	(United Kingdom) Joe Tanner	
Other junior formulae
Formula Dream	(Japan) Koudai Tsukakoshi	2005 Formula Dream
Formula Lista Junior	(Switzerland) Rolf Biland	2005 Formula Lista Junior season
Formula Maruti	(India) Raymond Banajee	2005 Formula Maruti season
Formula Toyota	(Japan) Kazuya Oshima	2005 Formula Toyota season
JAF Japan Formula 4	East: (Japan) Satoru Okada	2005 JAF Japan Formula 4
JAF Japan Formula 4	West: (Japan) Masaki Tanaka	2005 JAF Japan Formula 4
Skip Barber National Championship	(United States) Gerardo Bonilla	
Skip Barber National Championship	Masters: (Australia) Chris Wilcox	
Skip Barber Eastern Regional Series	(United States) Charles Anti	
Skip Barber Eastern Regional Series	Sportsman: (United States) Adrian Dixon	
Skip Barber Eastern Regional Series	Masters: (United States) Michael Auriemma	
Skip Barber Midwestern Regional Series	(United States) Revere Greist	
Skip Barber Midwestern Regional Series	Sportsman: (Canada) Mike Gomez	
Skip Barber Midwestern Regional Series	Masters: (United States) John Greist	
Skip Barber Southern Regional Series	(United States) Matt Varsha	
Skip Barber Southern Regional Series	Sportsman: (United States) Murray Marden	
Skip Barber Southern Regional Series	Masters: (United States) David Libby	
Skip Barber Western Regional Series	(United States) Tim Traver	
Skip Barber Western Regional Series	Sportsman: (United States) Sprague Theobald	
Skip Barber Western Regional Series	Masters: (United States) Jeffrey Kaiser	
Formula RUS	(Russia) Sergey Romaschenko	
Russian Formula 1600 Championship	(Russia) Vitaly Petrov	2005 Russian Formula 1600 Championship
Russian Formula 1600 Championship	Teams: (Russia) Lukoil Racing	2005 Russian Formula 1600 Championship
United States Speedway Series	(United States) Bailey Dotson	2005 United States Speedway Series

== Rallying ==
Series	Driver/Co-Driver	Season article
World Rally Championship	(France) Sébastien Loeb	2005 World Rally Championship
World Rally Championship	Co-Drivers: (Monaco) Daniel Elena	2005 World Rally Championship
World Rally Championship	Manufacturer: (France) Citroën	2005 World Rally Championship
Junior World Rally Championship	(Spain) Dani Sordo	2005 World Rally Championship
Production World Rally Championship	(Japan) Toshi Arai	2005 World Rally Championship
African Rally Championship	(Zambia) Muna Singh	2005 African Rally Championship
Asia-Pacific Rally Championship	(Finland) Jussi Välimäki	2005 Asia-Pacific Rally Championship
Asia-Pacific Rally Championship	Co-Drivers: (Finland) Jarkko Kalliolepo	2005 Asia-Pacific Rally Championship
Australian Rally Championship	(Australia) Cody Crocker	2005 Australian Rally Championship
Australian Rally Championship	Co-Drivers: (Australia) Dale Moscatt	2005 Australian Rally Championship
British Rally Championship	(United Kingdom) Mark Higgins	2005 British Rally Championship
British Rally Championship	Co-Drivers: (United Kingdom) Bryan Thomas	2005 British Rally Championship
Canadian Rally Championship	(Canada) Peter Thomson	2005 Canadian Rally Championship
Canadian Rally Championship	Co-Drivers: (Canada) Rod Hendrickson	2005 Canadian Rally Championship
Central European Zone Rally Championship	S1600: (Czech Republic) Josef Peták	2005 Central European Zone Rally Championship
Central European Zone Rally Championship	Group N: (Slovenia) Andrej Jereb	2005 Central European Zone Rally Championship
Central European Zone Rally Championship	Group A: (Serbia and Montenegro) Čedomir Brkič	2005 Central European Zone Rally Championship
Central European Zone Rally Championship	Historic: (Italy) Folco Gamberucci	2005 Central European Zone Rally Championship
Codasur South American Rally Championship	(Argentina) Juan Pablo Raies	
Czech Rally Championship	(Czech Republic) Václav Pech	2005 Czech Rally Championship
Czech Rally Championship	Co-Drivers: (Czech Republic) Petr Uhel	2005 Czech Rally Championship
Deutsche Rallye Meisterschaft	(Germany) Matthias Kahle	
Estonian Rally Championship	(Estonia) Margus Murakas	2005 Estonian Rally Championship
Estonian Rally Championship	Co-Drivers: (Estonia) Aare Ojamäe; Co-Drivers: (Estonia) Raul Markus	2005 Estonian Rally Championship
European Rally Championship	(Italy) Renato Travaglia	2005 European Rally Championship
European Rally Championship	Co-Drivers: (Italy) Flavio Zanella	2005 European Rally Championship
French Rally Championship	(France) Nicolas Bernardi	
Hungarian Rally Championship	(Hungary) János Tóth	
Hungarian Rally Championship	Co-Drivers: (Hungary) Bea Bahor	
Indian National Rally Championship	(India) V. R. Naren Kumar	
Indian National Rally Championship	Co-Drivers: (India) D. Ram Kumar	
Italian Rally Championship	(Italy) Piero Longhi	
Italian Rally Championship	Co-Drivers: (Italy) Maurizio Imerito	
Italian Rally Championship	Manufacturers: (Japan) Subaru	
Middle East Rally Championship	(Qatar) Nasser Al-Attiyah	
New Zealand Rally Championship	(New Zealand) Richard Mason	2005 New Zealand Rally Championship
New Zealand Rally Championship	Co-Drivers: (New Zealand) Garry Cowan	2005 New Zealand Rally Championship
Polish Rally Championship	(Poland) Leszek Kuzaj	
Rally America	(Canada) Patrick Richard	
Romanian Rally Championship	(Romania) Bogdan Marișca	
Scottish Rally Championship	(United Kingdom) Barry Johnson	
Scottish Rally Championship	Co-Drivers: (United Kingdom) Stewart Merry	
Slovak Rally Championship	(Slovakia) Jozef Béreš Jr.	
Slovak Rally Championship	Co-Drivers: (Slovakia) Petr Starý	
South African National Rally Championship	(South Africa) Jannie Habig	
South African National Rally Championship	Co-Drivers: (South Africa) Douglas Judd	
South African National Rally Championship	Manufacturers: (Japan) Toyota	
Spanish Rally Championship	(Spain) Dani Sordo	
Spanish Rally Championship	Co-Drivers: (Spain) Marc Martí	

=== Rallycross ===
Series	Driver	Season article
FIA European Rallycross Championship	Div 1: (Sweden) Kenneth Hansen	
FIA European Rallycross Championship	Div 1A: (Netherlands) Ron Snoeck	
FIA European Rallycross Championship	Div 2: (Finland) Jussi Pinomäki	
British Rallycross Championship	(United Kingdom) Pat Doran	

== Sports car and GT ==
Series	Driver	Season article
American Le Mans Series	LMP1: (Germany) Frank Biela; LMP1: (Italy) Emanuele Pirro	2005 American Le Mans Series season
American Le Mans Series	LMP1 Teams: (United States) ADT Champion Racing	2005 American Le Mans Series season
American Le Mans Series	LMP2: (United States) Clint Field	2005 American Le Mans Series season
American Le Mans Series	LMP2 Teams: (United States) Intersport Racing	2005 American Le Mans Series season
American Le Mans Series	GT1: (United Kingdom) Oliver Gavin; GT1: (Monaco) Olivier Beretta	2005 American Le Mans Series season
American Le Mans Series	GT1 Teams: (United States) Corvette Racing	2005 American Le Mans Series season
American Le Mans Series	GT2: (United States) Patrick Long; GT2: (Germany) Jörg Bergmeister	2005 American Le Mans Series season
American Le Mans Series	GT2 Teams: (United States) Petersen/White Lightning	2005 American Le Mans Series season
Australian GT Championship	(Australia) Bryce Washington	2005 Australian GT Championship
British GT Championship	GT2: (United Kingdom) Andrew Kirkaldy; GT2: (United Kingdom) Nathan Kinch	2005 British GT Championship
British GT Championship	GT3: (Greece) Dimitris Deverikos; GT3: (United Kingdom) Piers Masarati	2005 British GT Championship
Le Mans Series	LMP1: (France) Jean-Christophe Boullion; LMP1: (France) Emmanuel Collard	2005 Le Mans Series season
Le Mans Series	LMP1 Teams: (France) Pescarolo Sport	2005 Le Mans Series season
Le Mans Series	LMP2: (United Kingdom) Gareth Evans	2005 Le Mans Series season
Le Mans Series	LMP2 Teams: (United Kingdom) Chamberlain-Synergy	2005 Le Mans Series season
Le Mans Series	GT1: (Italy) Michele Bartyan; GT1: (Italy) Christian Pescatori; GT1: (Switzerland) Toni Seiler	2005 Le Mans Series season
Le Mans Series	GT1 Teams: (Italy) BMS Scuderia Italia	2005 Le Mans Series season
Le Mans Series	GT2: (France) Xavier Pompidou; GT2: (Germany) Marc Lieb	2005 Le Mans Series season
Le Mans Series	GT2 Teams: (United Kingdom) Sebah Automotive	2005 Le Mans Series season
Rolex Sports Car Series	DP: (Italy) Max Angelelli; DP: (South Africa) Wayne Taylor	2005 Rolex Sports Car Series season
Rolex Sports Car Series	GT: (United States) Craig Stanton	2005 Rolex Sports Car Series season
FIA GT Championship	GT1: (Switzerland) Gabriele Gardel	2005 FIA GT Championship season
FIA GT Championship	GT1 Teams: (Germany) Vitaphone Racing Team	2005 FIA GT Championship season
FIA GT Championship	GT2: (Germany) Marc Lieb; GT2: (Germany) Mike Rockenfeller	2005 FIA GT Championship season
FIA GT Championship	GT2 Teams: (United Kingdom) GruppeM Racing	2005 FIA GT Championship season
Porsche Supercup, Porsche Carrera Cup, GT3 Cup Challenge and Porsche Sprint Challenge
Porsche Supercup	(Italy) Alessandro Zampedri	2005 Porsche Supercup
Porsche Supercup	Teams: (Austria) Walter Lechner Racing	2005 Porsche Supercup
Porsche Carrera Cup Asia	(United Kingdom) Jonny Cocker	2005 Porsche Carrera Cup Asia
Australian Carrera Cup Championship	(New Zealand) Fabian Coulthard	2005 Australian Carrera Cup Championship
Porsche Carrera Cup Brasil	(Brazil) Beto Posses	2005 Porsche Carrera Cup Brasil
Porsche Carrera Cup France	(France) Anthony Beltoise	2005 Porsche Carrera Cup France
Porsche Carrera Cup France	Teams: (France) Team Sofrev ASP	2005 Porsche Carrera Cup France
Porsche Carrera Cup Germany	(Germany) Christian Menzel	2005 Porsche Carrera Cup Germany
Porsche Carrera Cup Germany	Teams: (Germany) Team HP-PZ Koblenz	2005 Porsche Carrera Cup Germany
Porsche Carrera Cup Great Britain	(Republic of Ireland) Damien Faulkner	2005 Porsche Carrera Cup Great Britain
Porsche Carrera Cup Great Britain	Teams: (United Kingdom) Team Parker Racing	2005 Porsche Carrera Cup Great Britain
Porsche Carrera Cup Japan	(Japan) Isao Ihashi	2005 Porsche Carrera Cup Japan
Porsche Carrera Cup Scandinavia	(Sweden) Fredrik Ros	2005 Porsche Carrera Cup Scandinavia
Porsche Carrera Cup Scandinavia	Teams: (Sweden) Podium Racing	2005 Porsche Carrera Cup Scandinavia

== Stock car racing ==
Series	Driver	Season article
NASCAR Nextel Cup Series	(United States) Tony Stewart	2005 NASCAR Nextel Cup Series
NASCAR Nextel Cup Series	Manufacturers: (United States) Chevrolet	2005 NASCAR Nextel Cup Series
NASCAR Busch Series	(United States) Martin Truex Jr.	2005 NASCAR Busch Series
NASCAR Busch Series	Manufacturers: (United States) Chevrolet	2005 NASCAR Busch Series
NASCAR Craftsman Truck Series	(United States) Ted Musgrave	2005 NASCAR Craftsman Truck Series
NASCAR Craftsman Truck Series	Manufacturers: (United States) Chevrolet	2005 NASCAR Craftsman Truck Series
NASCAR Busch North Series	(United States) Andy Santerre	2005 NASCAR Busch North Series
NASCAR West Series	(United States) Mike Duncan	2005 NASCAR West Series
ARCA Re/Max Series	(United States) Frank Kimmel	2005 ARCA Re/Max Series
Desafío Corona	(Mexico) Jorge Goeters	2005 Desafío Corona season
SCSA Racing Series	(Netherlands) Michael Vergers	2005 SCSA season
Turismo Carretera	(Argentina) Juan Manuel Silva	2005 Turismo Carretera

== Touring car ==
Series	Driver	Season article
World Touring Car Championship	Overall: (United Kingdom) Andy Priaulx	2005 World Touring Car Championship season
World Touring Car Championship	Teams: (Germany) BMW	2005 World Touring Car Championship season
World Touring Car Championship	Independents: (Germany) Marc Hennerici	2005 World Touring Car Championship season
ADAC Procar Series	(Switzerland) Mathias Schläppi	2005 ADAC Procar Series
ADAC Procar Series	Teams: (Switzerland) Maurer Motorsport	2005 ADAC Procar Series
Asian Touring Car Championship	(Germany) Franz Engstler	2005 Asian Touring Car Championship
Asian Touring Car Championship	Teams: (Germany) Engstler Motorsport	2005 Asian Touring Car Championship
Australian Saloon Car Series	(Australia) Bruce Heinrich	2005 Australian Saloon Car Series
British Touring Car Championship	(United Kingdom) Matt Neal	2005 British Touring Car Championship
British Touring Car Championship	Teams: (United Kingdom) Team Halfords	2005 British Touring Car Championship
British Touring Car Championship	Manufacturers: (United Kingdom) Vauxhall	2005 British Touring Car Championship
British Touring Car Championship	Independents: (United Kingdom) Matt Neal	2005 British Touring Car Championship
British Touring Car Championship	Independents Teams: (United Kingdom) Team Halfords	2005 British Touring Car Championship
BRL V6	(Netherlands) Jeroen Bleekemolen	2005 BRL V6 season
BRL Light	(Netherlands) Marijn van Kalmthout	2005 BRL Light season
Campeonato Brasileiro de Marcas e Pilotos	(Brazil) Rafael Iserhard	2005 Campeonato Brasileiro de Marcas e Pilotos
Danish Touringcar Championship	(Denmark) Casper Elgaard	2005 Danish Touringcar Championship
Deutsche Tourenwagen Masters	(United Kingdom) Gary Paffett	2005 Deutsche Tourenwagen Masters
Deutsche Tourenwagen Masters	Teams: (Germany) HWA Team I	2005 Deutsche Tourenwagen Masters
Eurocup Mégane Trophy	(Belgium) Jan Heylen	2005 Eurocup Mégane Trophy
Eurocup Mégane Trophy	Teams: Racing for Belgium	2005 Eurocup Mégane Trophy
Eurocup Mégane Trophy	Junior: (France) Sébastien Dhouailly	2005 Eurocup Mégane Trophy
Finnish Touring Car Championship	(Finland) Olli Haapalainen	
French Supertouring Championship	(France) Soheil Ayari	
Italian Superturismo Championship	(Italy) Alessandro Zanardi	2005 Italian Superturismo Championship
Italian Superturismo Championship	Teams: (Italy) ROAL Motorsport	2005 Italian Superturismo Championship
New Zealand V8 Championship	(New Zealand) Andy Booth	2004–05 New Zealand V8 season
V8 Supercar Championship Series	(Australia) Russell Ingall	2005 V8 Supercar Championship Series
V8 Supercar Championship Series	Teams: (Australia) Stone Brothers Racing	2005 V8 Supercar Championship Series
V8 Supercar Championship Series	Manufacturers: (United States) Ford	2005 V8 Supercar Championship Series
HPDC V8 Supercar Series	(Australia) Dean Canto	2005 Holden Performance Driving Centre V8 Supercar Series
SEAT Cupra Championship	(United Kingdom) Tom Boardman	2005 SEAT Cupra Championship
Stock Car Brasil	(Brazil) Giuliano Losacco	2005 Stock Car Brasil season
Superstars Series	(Italy) Tobia Masini	2005 Superstars Series
Superstars Series	Teams: (Italy) CAAL Racing	2005 Superstars Series
TC2000 Championship	(Argentina) Gabriel Ponce de León	2005 TC 2000 Championship
Clio Cup
Renault Clio Cup UK	(United Kingdom) Jonathan Adam	

== Truck racing ==
Series	Driver	Season article
European Truck Racing Championship	Super-Race-Trucks: (Germany) Ralf Druckenmüller	2004 European Truck Racing Championship
European Truck Racing Championship	Race-Trucks: (Spain) Antonio Albacete	2004 European Truck Racing Championship
Fórmula Truck	(Brazil) Wellington Cirino	2005 Fórmula Truck season
Fórmula Truck	Teams: (Brazil) ABF Mercedes-Benz	2005 Fórmula Truck season
Fórmula Truck	Manufacturers: (Sweden) Scania	2005 Fórmula Truck season
V8 Ute Racing Series	(Australia) Damien White	2005 V8 Ute Racing Series

== See also ==
- List of motorsport championships
- Auto racing
