= 2007 Australian Saloon Car Championship =

The 2007 Australian Saloon Car Championship was a CAMS sanctioned national motor racing championship open to Group 3K Saloon Cars. It was the seventh national series for Saloon Cars and the second to be contested as the Australian Saloon Car Championship.

== Schedule ==
The 2007 Australian Saloon Car Championship was contested over an eight-round series with three races per round.

Round	Circuit	State	Date
1	Oran Park Raceway	New South Wales	21–22 April
2	Phillip Island Grand Prix Circuit	Victoria	5–6 May
3	Queensland Raceway	Queensland	26–27 May
4	Mallala Motor Sport Park	South Australia	30 June-1 July
5	Eastern Creek International Raceway	New South Wales	14–15 July
6	Phillip Island Grand Prix Circuit	Victoria	11–12 August
7	Mallala Motor Sport Park	South Australia	13–14 October
8	Sandown International Motor Raceway	Victoria	8–9 December

== Points system ==
Championship points were awarded on a 40-35-31-27-23-20-17-15-13-11-10-9-8-7-6-5-4-3-2 basis for the first 19 positions in each race, with one point awarded for positions 20 through 40.

== Championship results ==
					Oran Park			Phillip Island			Qld Raceway			Mallala			Eastern Creek			Phillip Island			Mallala			Sandown			Total
Position	Driver	No.	Car	Entrant	R1	R2	R3	R1	R2	R3	R1	R2	R3	R1	R2	R3	R1	R2	R3	R1	R2	R3	R1	R2	R3	R1	R2	R3	
1	Bruce Heinrich	1	Ford AU Falcon	Tri-State Racing	40	35	35	31	35	5	-	31	31	40	40	40	35	40	40	40	40	20	40	40	35	31	31	-	755
2	Kris Walton	68	Ford AU Falcon	Talbrace Pty Ltd	35	27	31	40	4	40	10	40	40	13	23	35	40	35	35	35	-	40	31	35	40	40	40	40	749
3	Matt Lovell	17	Ford AU Falcon	Cell-tic Batteries	13	15	20	17	23	27	27	23	13	23	27	31	6	17	31	17	27	13	35	23	20	20	27	27	522
4	Steve Kwiatkowski	34	Ford AU Falcon	Westport Cars	15	23	23	-	-	-	-	35	35	20	35	27	31	31	23	20	10	35	-	31	27	35	15	31	502
5	John Goodacre	6	Holden VT Commodore	GaP Solutions / Brice Australia	17	-	9	35	40	35	23	27	20	27	20	20	20	13	-	-	-	-	-	-	-	27	35	35	403
6	Troy Hoey	13	Ford AU Falcon	Sunstate Gas & Plumbing Pty Ltd	10	11	17	15	5	11	31	20	15	9	17	17	-	15	17	15	20	15	20	15	13	13	17	15	353
7	Scott Nicolas	7	Ford AU Falcon	Chris Milton Engines	-	17	15	23	31	-	-	-	23	35	4	23	13	27	8	31	35	27	13	-	17	-	-	-	342
8	Clint Harvey	72	Ford AU Falcon	Strategic Transport Racing	31	40	40	-	20	31	-	-	-	-	-	-	17	23	20	-	-	-	-	-	-	23	20	23	288
9	Peter Dane	60	Ford AU Falcon	Cash Stop Racing	11	13	-	20	8	4	20	17	11	-	-	-	23	10	27	27	31	-	27	17	-	-	-	-	266
10	Brad Fox	80	Ford AU Falcon	Brad Fox	20	20	-	27	27	23	-	-	-	31	-	-	-	-	-	-	-	-	15	27	31	-	-	-	221
11	Kjake Camilleri	36	Holden VT Commodore	Envirotek Racing	27	4	-	5	15	20	40	-	27	10	15	-	-	-	-	-	-	-	-	-	-	-	11	20	194
12	Geoff Brown	82	Ford AU Falcon	Tri-State Racing	4	7	10	-	11	7	17	15	9	2	9	-	4	7	7	10	17	11	11	10	9	5	4	-	186
13	Paul Pennisi	46	Holden VT Commodore	Woodstock Motor Racing	7	8	7	9	9	8	13	-	-	8	11	11	5	5	-	7	23	23	-	-	-	10	8	-	172
14	Shawn Jamieson	15	Holden VT Commodore	Tri-State Racing	23	31	27	-	-	-	-	-	-	17	31	-	27	-	11	-	-	-	-	-	-	-	-	-	167
15	Kevin Weeks	77	Holden VT Commodore	BRE Performance	-	-	-	-	-	-	-	-	-	15	-	13	15	20	6	23	-	31	17	-	23	-	-	-	163
16	Robert Lonie	31	Holden VT Commodore	Gilbert Motor Bodies	-	-	-	4	10	13	-	-	-	6	7	15	9	9	10	9	11	7	10	13	10	9	9	-	161
17	Brenton Burr	74	Ford AU Falcon	Travel-Bug Vaccination Clinics	-	-	-	6	-	-	-	-	-	4	13	10	-	-	-	11	9	9	-	11	11	8	10	17	119
18	Tim Rowse	81	Holden VT Commodore	Rowse Motors	-	-	-	13	17	-	-	-	-	-	-	-	-	-	-	13	-	17	-	-	-	-	7	11	78
19	Brett Niall	55	Ford AU Falcon	Strategic Transport Racing	9	10	11	-	-	-	-	-	-	-	-	-	11	11	13	-	-	-	-	-	-	-	3	7	75
20	Brett Carrington	47	Ford AU Falcon	B&R Computers	-	-	-	10	13	15	-	-	-	-	-	-	-	-	-	8	15	8	-	-	-	-	-	-	69
21	Justin Garnett	22	Ford AU Falcon	Justin Garnett	-	-	-	-	-	-	-	-	-	-	-	-	-	-	-	6	13	10	-	-	-	15	23	-	67
22	Shane Smollen	56	Ford AU Falcon	McGrath Estate Agents	5	9	-	7	7	9	-	-	-	-	-	-	10	6	-	-	-	-	-	-	-	-	2	10	65
23	Rod Dawson	86	Ford AU Falcon	Kris Walton	-	-	-	-	-	-	35	9	17	-	-	-	-	-	-	-	-	-	-	-	-	-	-	-	61
24	David Clark	22	Ford AU Falcon	Northern Auto Gas	-	-	-	-	-	-	-	-	-	-	-	-	-	-	-	-	-	-	23	20	15	-	-	-	58
25	Malcolm Niall	54	Ford AU Falcon	Strategic Transport Racing	8	-	8	-	-	-	-	-	-	-	-	-	7	-	9	-	-	-	-	-	-	-	5	8	45
26	Bradley Piggott	48	Ford AU Falcon	Raleigh Raceway	6	-	13	11	-	10	-	-	-	-	-	-	-	-	-	-	-	-	-	-	-	-	-	-	40
27	Andrew Nowland	5	Ford AU Falcon	Coffey Ford	-	-	-	-	-	-	-	-	-	-	-	-	-	-	-	-	-	-	-	-	-	11	13	13	37
28	Naomi Maltby	91	Holden VN Commodore	Walkom Performance Engines	-	-	-	-	-	-	-	-	-	-	6	8	-	-	-	-	-	-	7	8	6	-	-	-	35
29	John van Gilst	21	Holden VN Commodore	Woodtech Australia	-	-	-	-	-	-	15	11	8	-	-	-	-	-	-	-	-	-	-	-	-	-	-	-	34
30	Mark Sutherland	44	Holden VN Commodore	Woodstock Motor Racing	3	5	5	8	6	6	-	-	-	-	-	-	-	-	-	-	-	-	-	-	-	-	-	-	33
31	Michael Seal	67	Ford AU Falcon	Michael Seal	-	-	-	-	-	-	-	-	-	-	-	-	8	8	15	-	-	-	-	-	-	-	-	-	31
32	Lindsay Kearns	67	Ford EA Falcon	Goldwell Handcare	-	-	-	-	-	-	-	13	10	-	-	-	-	-	-	-	-	-	-	-	-	4	-	-	27
33	Mark Primmer	41	Ford EA Falcon	Dial Before You Dig	-	-	-	-	-	-	9	10	7	-	-	-	-	-	-	-	-	-	-	-	-	-	-	-	26
33	Grace Monterosso	27	Holden VN Commodore	B&V Auto Techniques	-	-	-	-	-	-	-	-	-	1	-	-	-	-	-	-	-	-	8	9	8	-	-	-	26
33	Sam Milton	7	Ford AU Falcon	Chris Milton Engines	-	-	-	-	-	-	-	-	-	-	-	-	-	-	-	-	-	-	-	-	-	17	-	9	26
36	David Mitchell	28	Ford AU Falcon	Raleigh Raceway	2	6	6	-	-	-	11	-	-	-	-	-	-	-	-	-	-	-	-	-	-	-	-	-	25
37	Craig Smith	5	Ford EA Falcon	Plumbing Construction Projects	-	-	-	-	-	-	-	-	-	7	8	9	-	-	-	-	-	-	-	-	-	-	-	-	24
38	Ryan Millier	39	Ford EA Falcon	Bedggoods/Union Hydraulics	-	-	-	-	-	-	-	-	-	-	-	-	-	-	-	-	-	-	-	-	-	6	6	6	18
39	Kerry Wade	77	Holden VT Commodore	B.R.E Motorsport Services	-	-	-	-	-	17	-	-	-	-	-	-	-	-	-	-	-	-	-	-	-	-	-	-	17
40	George Diamond	40	Ford EA Falcon	Scania	-	-	-	-	-	-	-	-	-	-	-	-	-	-	-	-	-	-	9	-	7	-	-	-	16
40	Wayne King	25	Ford EA Falcon	Morphett Vale Garage	-	-	-	-	-	-	-	-	-	11	5	-	-	-	-	-	-	-	-	-	-	-	-	-	16
42	Andrew Hamilton	83	Ford EA Falcon	Vetech Fleet Management	-	-	-	-	-	-	-	-	-	5	10	-	-	-	-	-	-	-	-	-	-	-	-	-	15
43	Basil Stratos	41	Holden VT Commodore	Bendix	-	-	-	-	-	-	-	-	-	-	-	-	-	-	-	-	-	-	-	-	-	7	-	5	12
44	Barry Whitford	37	Ford EB Falcon	Sinergy Motorsports	-	-	-	-	-	-	-	-	-	3	-	7	-	-	-	-	-	-	-	-	-	-	-	-	10
45	Michael Uebergang	65	Ford AU Falcon	Betta Electrical	-	-	-	-	-	-	-	-	-	-	-	-	-	-	-	-	-	-	-	-	-	-	-	-	0
45	Nelson Brown	32	Ford EA Falcon	Mountadam Vineyards	-	-	-	-	-	-	-	-	-	-	-	-	-	-	-	-	-	-	-	-	-	-	-	-	0
45	Tony James	24	Holden VN Commodore	Tony James	-	-	-	-	-	-	-	-	-	-	-	-	-	-	-	-	-	-	-	-	-	-	-	-	0
45	Luke Westtall	27	Holden VP Commodore	LWR-Renovators Haven	-	-	-	-	-	-	-	-	-	-	-	-	-	-	-	-	-	-	-	-	-	-	-	-	0
