= 2006 Australian Saloon Car Championship =

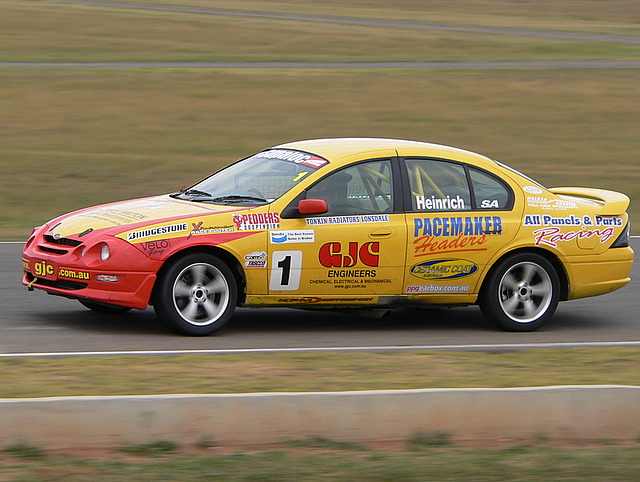
Bruce Heinrich won the 2006 Championship in a Ford AU Falcon

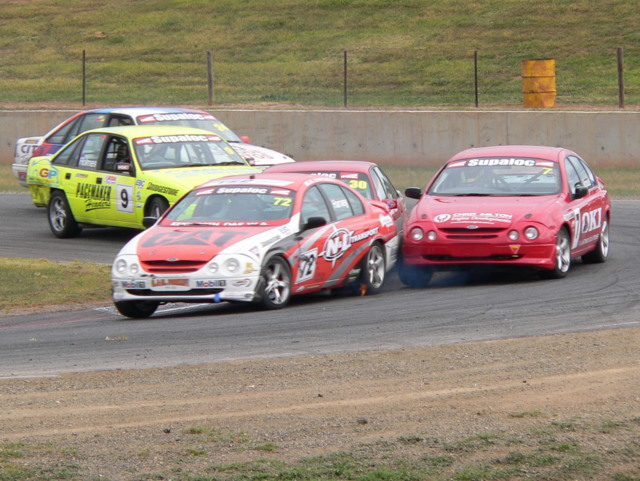
Clint Harvey (# 71 Ford AU Falcon) leads Paul Fiore (#30 Holden VN Commodore), Scott Nicholas (#7 Ford AU Falcon) and Peter Holmes (#9 Holden VN Commodore) at the Mallala Motor Sport Park round of the championship.

The 2006 Australian Saloon Car Championship was open to drivers of Saloon Cars complying with CAMS Group 3K regulations. The title was contested over a seven-round series with three races per round.

- Round 1, Wakefield Park Raceway, New South Wales, 5 March
- Round 2, Symmons Plains International Raceway, Tasmania, 8 & 9 April
- Round 3, Oran Park Raceway, New South Wales, 6 & 7 May
- Round 4, Mallala Motorsport Park, South Australia, 25 June
- Round 5, Phillip Island Grand Prix Circuit, Victoria, 19 & 20 August
- Round 6, Oran Park Raceway, New South Wales, 28 & 29 October
- Round 7, Eastern Creek International Raceway, New South Wales, 25 & 26 November

Points were awarded based on the results of each race as follows

- 1st, 40 points
- 2nd, 35 points
- 3rd, 31 points
- 4th, 27 points
- 5th, 23 points
- 6th, 20 points
- 7th, 17 points
- 8th, 15 points
- 9th, 13 points
- 10th, 11 points
- 11th, 10 points
- 12th, 9 points
- 13th, 8 points
- 14th, 7 points
- 15th, 6 points
- 16th, 5 points
- 17th, 4 points
- 18th, 3 points
- 19th, 2 points
- 20th to 40th, 1 point

The results of this, the first Australian Saloon Car Championship, are given below.

| Position | Driver | No. | Car | Entrant | Rd1 R1 | Rd1 R2 | Rd1 R3 | Rd2 R1 | Rd2 R2 | Rd2 R3 | Rd3 R1 | Rd3 R2 | Rd3 R3 | Rd4 R1 | Rd4 R2 | Rd4 R3 | Rd5 R1 | Rd5 R2 | Rd5 R3 | Rd6 R1 | Rd6 R2 | Rd6 R3 | Rd7 R1 | Rd7 R2 | Rd7 R3 | Points |
| 1 | Bruce Heinrich | 1 | Ford Falcon AU | GJ Engineers | 40 | - | 20 | 40 | 40 | 35 | 35 | 35 | 35 | 40 | 40 | 40 | 35 | 40 | 40 | 35 | 35 | 35 | 9 | 35 | 40 | 704 |
| 2 | Kris Walton | 38 | Ford Falcon AU | Talbrace Pty Ltd | 35 | 40 | 31 | 20 | 13 | 17 | 31 | 23 | 31 | 35 | 35 | 35 | 40 | 35 | 35 | 40 | 40 | 40 | 6 | - | 35 | 617 |
| 3 | Shawn Jamieson | 15 | Holden Commodore VT | All Panel & Parts | 23 | 23 | 13 | 23 | 17 | 13 | 20 | 17 | 27 | 31 | 31 | 31 | 15 | 27 | 31 | 27 | 31 | 27 | 35 | 31 | - | 493 |
| 4 | Clint Harvey | 71 | Ford Falcon AU | Strategic Transport Racing | 13 | 27 | 35 | 35 | 35 | 31 | 40 | 40 | 40 | 23 | 17 | 17 | 31 | 5 | 27 | 23 | - | 15 | - | - | - | 454 |
| 5 | John Goodacre | 2 | Holden Commodore VN & VT | Gap Solutions | 31 | 35 | 40 | - | 20 | 23 | 23 | 20 | 20 | 20 | - | 5 | 4 | 15 | 13 | 15 | 15 | 13 | - | - | - | 312 |
| 6 | Paul Fiore | 30 | Holden Commodore VN | BRE Performance | 27 | 31 | 27 | 7 | 31 | 40 | 15 | 5 | 15 | 17 | 20 | 15 | 27 | 23 | - | - | - | - | - | - | - | 300 |
| 7 | Matthew Lovell | 17 | Ford Falcon EA | Batteries Direct | 17 | 13 | 10 | 17 | - | - | 17 | 31 | - | 15 | 23 | 27 | 10 | 13 | 15 | 13 | 17 | 20 | 31 | - | 10 | 299 |
| 8 | Peter Dane | 60 | Ford Falcon EA & AU | Cash Stop Racing | 20 | 17 | 15 | - | - | - | 27 | 27 | 23 | 6 | 8 | 6 | 17 | 17 | 23 | 11 | 20 | 23 | 20 | 17 | - | 297 |
| 9 | Jake Camilleri | 36 | Ford Falcon EA & Holden Commodore VT | Grand Prix Panel & Paint | 8 | - | - | 31 | 27 | 27 | 10 | 13 | 13 | 27 | 27 | 20 | - | - | - | 17 | 9 | 11 | - | - | - | 240 |
| 10 | Scott Nicholas | 7 | Ford Falcon AU | Oaki Printing Solutions | - | - | - | - | - | - | - | - | - | 9 | 7 | 13 | 7 | - | - | 7 | 23 | 31 | 40 | 40 | 31 | 208 |
| 11 | Roger Paterson | 18 | Holden Commodore VN & Ford Falcon AU | Sportsmed SA Hospitals | 7 | 8 | 3 | 13 | - | 11 | 6 | 3 | - | - | - | - | 13 | 2 | - | 9 | 13 | 9 | 23 | 23 | 23 | 166 |
| 12 | Michael Barbara | 8 | Holden Commodore VN | Cash Stop Racing | 10 | 15 | 17 | 11 | 15 | - | 13 | 15 | 17 | 5 | 10 | 8 | 3 | 9 | 6 | - | - | - | - | - | - | 154 |
| 13 | Brett Niall | 55 | Ford Falcon AU | Strategic Transport Racing | 4 | 6 | 6 | 5 | 6 | 9 | 9 | 10 | 9 | 3 | 6 | 3 | 11 | 10 | 17 | 10 | 11 | 8 | - | - | - | 143 |
| 14 | Brett Carrington | 47 | Ford Falcon AU | B & R Computers | - | - | - | - | 1 | 1 | 1 | 1 | 1 | 2 | 1 | - | 9 | 11 | - | 8 | 8 | 10 | 27 | 27 | 27 | 135 |
| 15 | Steve Kwiatkowski | 34 | Ford Falcon EA | Westport Cars | 15 | 20 | 23 | 27 | 23 | 20 | - | - | - | - | - | - | - | - | - | - | - | - | - | - | - | 128 |
| 16 | Brad Fox | 80 | Ford Falcon EA | Computer-line Rick | - | - | - | - | - | - | 5 | 1 | - | - | - | - | 20 | 31 | 10 | 31 | 27 | - | - | - | - | 125 |
| 17 | Geoff Brown | 82 | Ford Falcon AU | Tri-State Racing | 1 | 1 | 1 | 9 | 3 | 7 | 7 | 9 | 11 | 1 | 4 | - | 5 | - | 8 | 3 | 7 | 7 | - | 15 | 17 | 116 |
| 18 | Malcolm Niall | 54 | Ford Falcon AU | Strategic Transport Racing | 2 | 4 | 5 | 8 | 10 | - | 11 | 11 | 10 | 4 | 9 | 7 | 8 | 1 | 7 | - | - | - | - | - | - | 97 |
| 19 | Paul Pennisi | 46 | Holden Commodore VN & VT | Woodstock Motor Racing | 1 | 1 | 1 | 3 | 1 | 5 | 1 | 4 | 5 | 1 | - | - | 6 | 8 | 11 | 1 | 4 | 3 | 15 | 11 | 11 | 93 |
| 20 | Brett Bowden | 42 | Ford Falcon EA | Dial 1100 Before You Dig | 1 | 3 | 4 | 10 | 9 | 6 | 8 | 7 | 8 | 1 | 3 | 1 | 2 | 4 | 5 | 4 | 1 | 4 | - | - | - | 81 |
| 21 | Paul Williams | 50 | Ford Falcon EA | Strategic Transport Racing | 1 | 1 | 1 | 15 | - | 10 | 2 | 8 | 7 | 8 | 1 | 9 | 1 | 3 | 9 | 1 | - | 2 | - | - | - | 79 |
| 22 | Tony James | 10 | Holden Commodore VN | BRE Performance | 11 | 11 | 11 | - | 11 | 15 | - | - | - | - | - | - | - | 6 | 2 | - | - | - | - | - | - | 67 |
| | Robert Lonie | 31 | Holden Commodore VN | Gilbert Motor Bodies | - | - | - | - | - | - | - | - | - | - | - | 1 | 1 | 1 | 1 | 2 | 3 | 1 | 17 | 20 | 20 | 67 |
| 24 | Robert Rubis | 76 & 77 | Ford Falcon EA & AU | Sydney Tower Restaurants | 6 | 10 | 9 | - | - | - | - | - | - | - | - | - | - | - | - | 1 | 10 | 17 | - | - | - | 53 |
| 25 | Wayne King | 25 | Ford Falcon EA | U-Pull-It Auto Disman | - | - | - | - | - | - | - | - | - | 13 | 15 | 23 | - | - | - | - | - | - | - | - | - | 51 |
| 26 | Paul Fiore | 30 | Holden Commodore VN | BRE Performance | - | - | - | - | - | - | - | - | - | - | - | - | 27 | 23 | - | - | - | - | - | - | - | 50 |
| 27 | Adam Hughes | 66 | Ford Falcon EA | Embroid Me Liverpool | - | - | - | - | - | - | - | - | - | - | - | - | - | - | - | 6 | - | - | 13 | 13 | 15 | 47 |
| 28 | John Ierardo | 45 | Holden Commodore VN | Woodstock Motor Racing | 1 | 1 | 2 | - | 2 | 4 | - | - | - | 1 | 2 | 1 | 1 | 1 | 4 | - | - | - | 10 | 10 | - | 40 |
| 29 | Shane Smollen | 56 | Ford Falcon EA | McGrath Estate Agents | - | - | - | - | - | - | - | - | - | - | - | - | - | - | - | 1 | 2 | 1 | 11 | 9 | 13 | 37 |
| 30 | Tim Rowse | 81 | Holden Commodore VT | Rowse Motors | 3 | 5 | 1 | - | - | - | - | - | - | - | - | - | - | 7 | 20 | - | - | - | - | - | - | 36 |
| 31 | David Rogers | 87 | Holden Commodore VN | Manual Transmission Factory | - | - | - | - | - | - | - | - | - | - | - | - | - | - | - | 5 | 6 | 6 | 8 | - | 9 | 34 |
| | David Lines | 24 | Holden Commodore VN | Aust Crash | - | - | - | - | - | - | - | - | - | 11 | 13 | 10 | - | - | - | - | - | - | - | - | - | 34 |
| 33 | Peter Holmes | 9 | Holden Commodore VN | Peter Holmes | - | - | - | - | - | - | - | - | - | 7 | 11 | 11 | - | - | - | - | - | - | - | - | - | 29 |
| 34 | Mark Southerland | 44 | Holden Commodore VN | Woodstock Motor Racing | 1 | 2 | - | 4 | 4 | 2 | 3 | 6 | 6 | - | - | - | - | - | - | - | - | - | - | - | - | 28 |
| 35 | Mark Primmer | 41 | Ford Falcon EA | Dial 1100 Before You Dig | 1 | 1 | 1 | - | 1 | 3 | 1 | 1 | 2 | 1 | 1 | 1 | 1 | 1 | 1 | 1 | 1 | - | 7 | - | - | 26 |
| 36 | Stephen Robinson | 40 | Holden Commodore VN | David Gainer | 9 | 7 | 7 | - | - | - | - | - | - | - | - | - | - | - | - | - | - | - | - | - | - | 23 |
| 37 | Tony Evangelou | 86 | Ford Falcon EA | ANT Racing | 5 | 9 | 8 | - | - | - | - | - | - | - | - | - | - | - | - | - | - | - | - | - | - | 22 |
| 38 | Craig Smith | 90 | Ford Falcon EB | Life Tiles | 1 | 1 | 1 | - | 8 | 1 | 4 | - | 4 | - | 1 | - | - | - | - | - | - | - | - | - | - | 21 |
| 39 | Grant Johnson | 54 | Ford Falcon AU | Strategic Transport Racing | - | - | - | - | - | - | - | - | - | - | - | - | - | - | - | 20 | - | - | - | - | - | 20 |
| 40 | John van Gilst | 21 | Holden Commodore VN | Woodtech | - | - | - | 6 | 5 | 8 | - | - | - | - | - | - | - | - | - | - | - | - | - | - | - | 19 |
| 41 | Ken Wright | 13 | Ford Falcon EA | Mercbits | - | - | - | - | 7 | - | - | - | - | - | - | - | - | - | - | 1 | 5 | 5 | - | - | - | 18 |
| 42 | Michael Bartsch | 19 | Holden Commodore VN | Bartsch Builders | - | 1 | 1 | - | - | - | 1 | 2 | - | 10 | - | 1 | - | - | - | - | - | - | - | - | - | 16 |
| 43 | Andrew Hamilton | 83 | Ford Falcon EA | VEHTEC | - | - | - | - | - | - | - | - | - | 1 | 5 | 4 | 1 | 1 | 3 | - | - | - | - | - | - | 15 |
| 44 | Peter Hogan | 52 | Holden Commodore VN | | - | - | - | - | - | - | 1 | 1 | 3 | - | - | - | - | - | - | - | - | - | - | - | - | 5 |
| 45 | Lindsay Gates | 3 | Holden Commodore VN | Ceramic Coat Aust | 1 | 1 | - | - | - | - | - | - | - | - | 1 | 1 | - | - | - | - | - | - | - | - | - | 4 |
| 46 | Brenton Burr | 74 | Ford Falcon AU | Regency Building Supplies | - | - | - | - | - | - | - | - | - | 1 | 1 | 1 | - | - | - | - | - | - | - | - | - | 3 |
| | Pat Calabrese | 4 | Holden Commodore VN | Bianco Building Supplies | - | - | - | - | - | - | - | - | - | 1 | 1 | 1 | - | - | - | - | - | - | - | - | - | 3 |
| | Mark Pilatti | 77 | Holden Commodore VN | Readymix | - | - | - | - | - | - | - | - | - | - | - | - | 1 | 1 | 1 | - | - | - | - | - | - | 3 |
| 49 | Brad Boley | 12 | Holden Commodore VN | BRE Performance | - | - | - | - | - | - | - | - | - | - | - | 2 | - | - | - | - | - | - | - | - | - | 2 |
| | Grace Monterosso | 27 | Holden Commodore VN | Bianco Building Supplies | - | - | - | - | - | - | - | - | - | - | 1 | 1 | - | - | - | - | - | - | - | - | - | 2 |
| 51 | Luke Norris | 16 | Holden Commodore VN | Woodtech | - | - | - | - | - | - | - | - | - | - | - | - | - | - | - | - | - | - | - | - | - | 0 |

Note : The Paul Fiore listed in 6th position and the Paul Fiore listed in 26th position are undoubtedly the same driver. This duplication appears in the results published at www.tascco.com.au and also those published in The Annual.
