= Australian Saloon Car Series =

- Category: Touring Car Racing
- Country: Australia
- Inaugural season: 2000
- Constructors: Holden; Ford
- Tyre suppliers: Bridgestone
- Drivers' champion: Damian Mitchell (A class); Justin Chaffey (B class)

The Australian Super Six Touring Car Series, known originally as the Australian Saloon Car Series, is an Australian motor racing series for drivers of Group 3K Saloon Cars. The Saloon Car category was devised as a low cost amateur sedan racing formula which would potentially replace the ageing HQ Holden category. The original regulations were focused around large Australian sedans of early 1990s vintage with eligibility limited to VN and VP series Holden Commodores and the EA and EB series Ford Falcons. The regulations limited the cars to six cylinder versions rather than the V8 engined models, as the latter might make the category too similar to Commodore Cup. The cars are slightly modified from their road going versions, with an emphasis on safety for racing.

The Saloon Car category made its debut at the 2000 Adelaide 500 meeting in what was the first round of a three-round series. The annual series was officially sanctioned by the Confederation of Australian Motor Sport from 2002 and state level series have also evolved in New South Wales, Victoria, Queensland, South Australia and Western Australia. The category has been particularly successful in Western Australia.

The first major change in the category regulations saw an update in vehicle eligibility for the 2006 season with the Holden VT Commodore and the Ford AU Falcon models added to the field. The newer models proved instantly more competitive and the older cars soon slipped down the field and were relegated to class results or state level series.

In the same year the series was granted “National Championship” status by the CAMS and officially became the Australian Saloon Car Championship. After a second year as a Championship in 2007 it reverted to its “National Series” status for 2008. In 2014 the series was rebranded under the title of Australian Super Six Touring Car Series.

The category's most successful driver has been Bruce Heinrich who has won the national series five times, including the two Australian Saloon Car Championship titles.

== Series winners ==
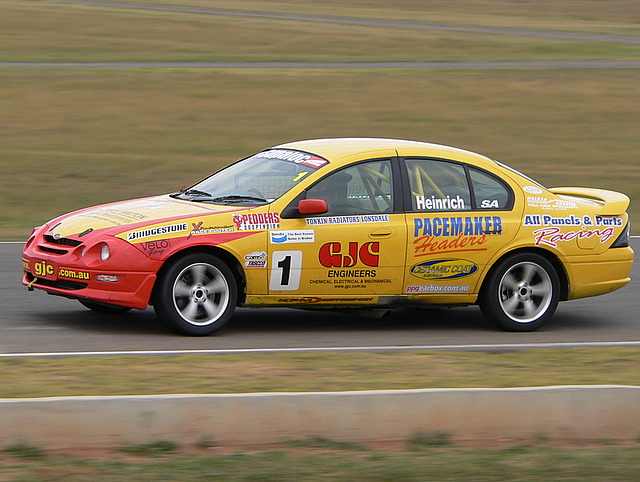
Bruce Heinrich won both Australian Saloon Car Championships in a Ford AU Falcon

Year	Winner	Car
2000	Shane Beikoff	Holden VN Commodore
2001	Tony Evangelou	Holden VN Commodore
2002	Bruce Heinrich	Ford EA Falcon
2003	Bruce Heinrich	Ford EA Falcon
2004	Clint Harvey	Holden VN Commodore
2005	Bruce Heinrich	Ford EA Falcon
2006 #	Bruce Heinrich	Ford AU Falcon
2007 #	Bruce Heinrich	Ford AU Falcon
2008	Steve Kwiatkowski	Ford AU Falcon
2009	Shawn Jamieson	Holden VT Commodore
2010	Tim Rowse	Holden VT Commodore
2011	Matt Lovell	Ford AU Falcon
2012	Simon Tabinor	Holden VT Commodore
2013	Simon Tabinor	Holden VT Commodore
2014	Gavin Ross	Holden VT Commodore
2015	Gavin Ross	Holden VT Commodore
2016	Grant Johnson	Holden VT Commodore

1. Note: In 2006 & 2007 only, the series had National Championship status and was officially known as the Australian Saloon Car Championship.
