= Canadian Rally Championship =

Automobile rallying championship in Canada

- Category: Rallying
- Country: Canada
- Inaugural season: 1957
- Classes: O4WD, P4WD, O2WD, P2WD
- Drivers' champion: (Mexico) Ricardo Cordero
- Co-Drivers' champion: (Mexico) Marco Hernandez
- Makes' champion: Citroen
- Official website: www.carsrally.ca

Bryan Maplethorpe, in his open class 2002 Subaru Impreza WRX rally car at the 2007 Kananaskis Rally in Alberta, Canada

The Canadian Rally Championship is an automobile rallying championship sanctioned by the Canadian Association of RallySport (CARS) held since 1957 in Canada.

The Canadian Rally Championship follows a 2 class format; 2-Wheel Drive, 4/All-Wheel Drive.

== Canadian rallying history ==
The Canadian Rally Championship (CRC) is Canada's only national rallying series. 2007 marked the 50th anniversary of the Canadian Rally Championship, making it the longest running motorsport series in Canada. It has been run continuously since 1957 when Leslie Chelminski and Les Stanley from Montreal shared the very first national rally title in a factory-prepared Volkswagen Karmann-Ghia. In the early days, the rally championship was based on a navigational (also called time-speed-distance or TSD) rally series which, at times, had as many as twenty events in the series. The most notable Canadian car rallies in those days were the Canadian Winter Rally and the Shell 4000. Some Rally champions from the TSD era include Art Dempsey, Bill Silvera, and Canadian Motorsport Hall of Fame inductees John Bird, Paul S. Manson, and Bruce D. Simpson.

As the sport gradually changed and adopted the European "stage" format, performance rallying became part of the Canadian motorsport picture. As opposed to TSD rallies, where competitors are required to follow the organizer's schedule, travel below posted speed limits and otherwise adhere to the rules of the public roads they are traveling on, performance rallies incorporate high speed "special stages" on roads closed to vehicles other than the rally cars, which must be specially prepared with full safety equipment. In 1973, the Canadian Rally Championship became based solely on stage rallies, including the Rally of the Tall Pines, which is still the premier event, and is held in November every year.

== 2026 CRC Season ==
The 2026 Canadian Rally Championship is a season of rally racing sanctioned by the Canadian Association of Rallysport (CARS). The championship features a calendar of eight events across Canada, held on surfaces including gravel, snow, and ice. The season's competition includes various vehicle classes, such as Open 4WD, Prepared 4WD, Open 2WD, and Prepared 2WD.

== Calendar ==
=== 2026 Event Calendar ===
A map showing the locations of the rallies in the 2025 championship. Event headquarters are marked with black dots.

Round	Start date	Finish date	Rally	Location	Club	Surface	Stages	Distance
1	06 February	07 February	(Quebec) Rally Perce-Neige of Maniwaki	Maniwaki, Quebec	CASLL	Snow / Ice	18	193.84 km
2	29 May	31 May	(British Columbia) Rocky Mountain Rally	Invermere, British Columbia	CSCC	Gravel	12	165.38 km
3	05 June	06 June	(British Columbia) Pacific Forest Rally	Merritt, British Columbia	WCRA	Gravel	10	165.40 km
4	26 June	28 June	(Quebec) International Rallye Baie des Chaleurs	New Richmond, Quebec	CRAB	Gravel	14	209.13 km
5	11 September	12 September	(Quebec) Rallye Defi Petite Nation	Saint-Victor-de-Beauce, Quebec	CASLL	Gravel	?	? km
6	30 October	01 November	(Quebec) Rallye de Charlevoix	La Malbaie, Quebec	CASLL	Gravel	19	202.63 km
7	20 November	21 November	(Ontario) Rally of the Tall Pines	Bancroft, Ontario	MLRC	Gravel	15	170.72 km
8	04 December	05 December	(British Columbia) Big White Winter Rally	Kelowna, British Columbia	WCRA	Snow / Ice	12	190.65 km

== Results and standings ==
=== Season summary ===
Round	Event	Winning driver	Winning co-driver	Winning car	Winning time
1	(Quebec) Rally Perce-Neige of Maniwaki	(Russia) Leonid Urlichich Crazy Leo	(France) Enzo Mahinc	(Japan) Subaru Impreza STi N12	2:07:39.0
2	(British Columbia) Rocky Mountain Rally	(Lithuania) Martynas Samsonas	(Lithuania) Kajus Samsonas	(Japan) Subaru Impreza STi N14	1:16:33.1
3	(British Columbia) Pacific Forest Rally	Cancelled	Cancelled	Cancelled	Cancelled
4	(Quebec) Rallye Baie des Chaleurs	(Canada) Jean-Sébastien Besner	(Canada) Hubert Gaudreau	(United States) Ford Fiesta Proto	2:13:50.0
5	(Quebec) Rallye Défi Beauce-Appalaches	(Canada) Jean-Sébastien Besner	(Canada) Hubert Gaudreau	(Czech Republic) Škoda Fabia Rally2 evo	1:47:40.0
6	(Quebec) Rallye de Charlevoix				
7	(Ontario) Novus Automotive Rally of the Tall Pines				
8	(British Columbia) Big White Winter Rally				

=== 2026 Drivers' Championship Standings ===
Each driver earns 1 point for starting a rally and 1 additional point for finishing it. Position-based points are awarded according to standard CRC regulations.

Overall Standing
Pos.	Driver	RPN (Quebec)	RMR (British Columbia)	PFR (British Columbia)	BDC (Quebec)	DPN (Quebec)	RDC (Quebec)	RTP (Ontario)	BWR (British Columbia)	Points
1	(Canada) André Leblanc	16th	3rd		4th					28
2	(Canada) Jérôme Mailloux	5th			2nd					27
3	(Canada) Jean-Sébastien Besner	15th			1st					24
4	(Russia) Leonid Urlichich	1st								22
4	(Lithuania) Martynas Samsonas		1st							22
6	(Canada) Yohan Tessier	2nd			DNF					18
7	(Germany) Hardy Schmidtke		2nd							17
8	(Canada) Vincent Trudel	7th			5th					16
8	(Canada) Alexandre Moreau	DNF	DNF		3rd					16
10	(Canada) Olivier Martel	3rd								14

Prepared 4WD Standing
Pos.	Driver	RPN (Quebec)	RMR (British Columbia)	PFR (British Columbia)	BDC (Quebec)	DPN (Quebec)	RDC (Quebec)	RTP (Ontario)	BWR (British Columbia)	Points
1	(North Macedonia) Michael Dimkovski	1st			1st					18
2	(United Kingdom) Rose Oakhill		1st							9
3	(Canada) Olivier Landreville	2nd								6
3	(Canada) Vincent Bourque	5th			3rd					6
3	(Kenya) Azam Deen		2nd							6
3	(Canada) Alexandre Laviolette				2nd					6
7	(Canada) Marc-André Drouin	4th			5th					5
8	(Canada) Simon Aubé	3rd								4
9	(Canada) Karim Fodil-Lemelin				4th					3
10	(Canada) Réjean Perron				6th					1

2WD Overall Standing
Pos.	Driver	RPN (Quebec)	RMR (British Columbia)	PFR (British Columbia)	BDC (Quebec)	DPN (Quebec)	RDC (Quebec)	RTP (Ontario)	BWR (British Columbia)	Points
1	(Canada) André Leblanc	5th	1st		1st					54
2	(Canada) Dave St-Pierre	4th	6th		3rd					34
3	(France) Maxime Galpin	3rd			2nd					31
4	(Canada) Vincent Lalande	1st			DNF					23
5	(Canada) Nicolas Laverdière	2nd								17
5	(Canada) Kornelius Rempel		2nd							17
7	(Canada) Aran Cook		3rd							14
8	(Canada) Andrew Miller				4th					12
8	(Republic of Ireland) Bryan McCarthy		4th							12
10	(Canada) Mathieu Royer	6th			10th					11

Prepared 2WD Standing
Pos.	Driver	RPN (Quebec)	RMR (British Columbia)	PFR (British Columbia)	BDC (Quebec)	DPN (Quebec)	RDC (Quebec)	RTP (Ontario)	BWR (British Columbia)	Points
1	(Canada) Mathieu Royer	1st			4th					12
2	(Canada) Aran Cook		1st							9
2	(Canada) David Gagné				1st					9
4	(Canada) Jim Stevens	2nd			6th					7
5	(Republic of Ireland) Bryan McCarthy		2nd							6
5	(Canada) Marc-Olivier Leblanc				2nd					6
7	(Canada) Dan Galipeau				3rd					4
8	(Canada) Philippe Normandeau				5th					2
9										
10										

=== 2026 Co-Drivers' Championship Standings ===
Points for co-drivers are awarded using the same system as the drivers' championship.

Overall Standing
Pos.	Driver	RPN (Quebec)	RMR (British Columbia)	PFR (British Columbia)	BDC (Quebec)	DPN (Quebec)	RDC (Quebec)	RTP (Ontario)	BWR (British Columbia)	Points
1	(Canada) Philippe Poirier	5th			2nd					27
2	(Canada) Hubert Gaudreau		DNF		1st					23
3	(France) Enzo Mahinc	1st								22
3	(Lithuania) Kajus Samsonas		1st							22
5	(Canada) Marie-France Desmarais Trepanier	2nd			DNF					18
6	(North Macedonia) Stefan Trajkov		2nd							17
7	(Canada) René Leblanc	16th	3rd							16
8	(Canada) Ian Guité	DNF			3rd					15
9	(United States) Michelle Miller		9th		5th					14
9	(Canada) Simon Levac	6th			7th					14

Prepared 4WD Standing
Pos.	Driver	RPN (Quebec)	RMR (British Columbia)	PFR (British Columbia)	BDC (Quebec)	DPN (Quebec)	RDC (Quebec)	RTP (Ontario)	BWR (British Columbia)	Points
1	(Canada) Simon Levac	1st			1st					18
2	(Canada) Sarah Temporale		1st							9
3	(Canada) Alexandre Marcoux	2nd			6th					7
4	(Canada) Simon Lamarre	5th			3rd					6
4	(Canada) Dan Bobyn		2nd							6
4	(Canada) Samuel Motreff				2nd					6
7	(Canada) Marc-André Briand	4th			5th					5
8	(Canada) Gabrielle St-Jacques	3rd								4
9	(Canada) Jonathan Downing				4th					3
10										

2WD Overall Standing
Pos.	Driver	RPN (Quebec)	RMR (British Columbia)	PFR (British Columbia)	BDC (Quebec)	DPN (Quebec)	RDC (Quebec)	RTP (Ontario)	BWR (British Columbia)	Points
1	(Canada) René Leblanc	5th	1st							32
2	(France) Fabien Craen	1st								22
2	(Canada) Dave Cyr				1st					22
4	(Canada) Éric Dubé	4th	6th		DNF					21
5	(Canada) Marc-Olivier Lamontagne	2nd								17
5	(France) Théo Mallet				2nd					17
5	(Canada) Andrew Andrus		2nd							17
8	(Canada) Jonathan G. Desgroseilliers	3rd			12th					16
9	(Canada) Robert Jackett		3rd							14
9	(Canada) Pierre-Luc Chouinard				3rd					14

Prepared 2WD Standing
Pos.	Driver	RPN (Quebec)	RMR (British Columbia)	PFR (British Columbia)	BDC (Quebec)	DPN (Quebec)	RDC (Quebec)	RTP (Ontario)	BWR (British Columbia)	Points
1	(Canada) Alyssa Voyzelle-Montminy	1st			4th					12
2	(Canada) Robert Jackett		1st							9
2	(Canada) Pierre-Charles Babin				1st					9
4	(Canada) Brandon Pace	2nd			6th					7
5	(Canada) Chuck Bolger		2nd							6
5	(Canada) Jean-Francois Brière				2nd					6
7	(Canada) Colin Turk				3rd					4
8	(Canada) Caroline Moreau				5th					2
9										
10										

=== 2026 Manufacturers' Championship Standings ===
Points for the Manufacturers' Championship are awarded based on the best-placed entry for each manufacturer at each event, using the standard Canadian Rally Championship points system.

==== Overall Standing ====
Pos.	Driver	RPN (Quebec)	RMR (British Columbia)	PFR (British Columbia)	BDC (Quebec)	DPN (Quebec)	RDC (Quebec)	RTP (Ontario)	BWR (British Columbia)	Points
1	(Japan) Subaru	1st	1st							40
2	(Japan) Mitsubishi	8th	2nd							18
3	(United States) Ford		3rd							12
4	(Japan) Honda		5th							8
6	(Japan) Toyota		7th							4
6	(Germany) Volkswagen		8th							3
7	(France) Peugeot	9th								2
8										
9										
10										

==== 2WD Standing ====
Pos.	Driver	RPN (Quebec)	RMR (British Columbia)	PFR (British Columbia)	BDC (Quebec)	DPN (Quebec)	RDC (Quebec)	RTP (Ontario)	BWR (British Columbia)	Points
1	(United States) Ford	4th	1st							30
2	(France) Peugeot	1st								20
3	(Japan) Honda		2nd							15
4	(Japan) Toyota		3rd							12
5	(Germany) Volkswagen		4th							10
6	(Japan) Subaru		5th							8
7	(Japan) Nissan	6th								6
8	(Japan) Suzuki	7th								4
9										
10										

=== 2026 Novice Championship Standings ===
The Novice Cup in the Canadian Rally Championship is awarded to eligible new drivers who have competed in fewer than six performance rallies before the start of the season. Points are awarded based on a different system as the main drivers' championship, 9 points = 1st, 6 points = 2nd, 4 points = 3rd, 3 point = 4th, 2 points = 5th and 1 points = 6th. Only novice drivers are ranked in this category, and the top-placed novice at each event earns points from their overall position in the rally.

Overall Standing
Pos.	Driver	RPN (Quebec)	RMR (British Columbia)	PFR (British Columbia)	BDC (Quebec)	DPN (Quebec)	RDC (Quebec)	RTP (Ontario)	BWR (British Columbia)	Points
1	(Canada) Yohan Tessier	1st								9
1	(Republic of Ireland) Bryan McCarthy		1st							9
3	(North Macedonia) Michael Dimkovski	2nd								6
3	(Canada) Leon Wawryk		2nd							6
5	(Canada) Olivier Landreville	3rd								4
5	(United Kingdom) Rose Oakhill		3rd							4
7	(Canada) Marc-André Drouin	4th								3
8	(Canada) Vincent Bourque	5th								2
9										
10										

=== 2026 Ladies Cup Championship Standings ===
In the realm of the Canadian Rally Championship, the Ladies Cup represents a special recognition for women behind the wheel. Using a points system aligned with that of the novice category, female competitors collect scores based on how they place among other eligible participants. This class is designed to foster inclusion, encourage more women to take part in rallying, and highlight their ongoing contributions and competitive consistency throughout the series.

Overall Standing
Pos.	Driver	RPN (Quebec)	RMR (British Columbia)	PFR (British Columbia)	BDC (Quebec)	DPN (Quebec)	RDC (Quebec)	RTP (Ontario)	BWR (British Columbia)	Points
1	(Canada) Marie-France Desmarais Trepanier	1st								9
1	(Canada) Celine Pepperdine		1st							9
3	(Canada) Gabrielle Saint-Jacques	2nd								6
3	(United States) Josie Rimmer		2nd							6
3	(United States) Michelle Miller		2nd							6
6	(Canada) Karianne Hubert	3rd								4
6	(Canada) Erika Seguin	3rd								4
6	(United Kingdom) Rose Oakhill		3rd							4
6	(Canada) Sarah Temporale		3rd							4
10	(Canada) Alyssa Voyzelle-Montminy	4th								3

== Statistiques ==
=== Champions ===
Year	Driver	Co-Driver	Marque
1957	Leslie Chelminski	Les Stanley	Volkswagen
1958	Leslie Chelminski		
1959	Art Dempsey	Bill A. Silvera	
1960	Art Dempsey	Bill A. Silvera	
1961	William Silvera	Bill A. Silvera	
1962	John C. Wilson		
1963	John Bird		Volkswagen
1964	John Bird		Volkswagen
1965	John Bird		Volkswagen
1966	Bruce Simpson		Volvo
1967	Bruce Simpson		Datsun
1968	Keith Ronald	John Slade	Volkswagen
1969	Bruce Schmidt	Betty Schmidt/Paul S. Manson	Datsun
1970	Walter Boyce	Doug Woods	Datsun
1971	Walter Boyce	Doug Woods	Datsun
1972	Walter Boyce	Doug Woods	Datsun
1973	Walter Boyce	Doug Woods	Fiat
1974	Walter Boyce	Doug Woods	Toyota
1975	Jean-Paul Pérusse	John Bellefleur	Fiat
1976	Jean-Paul Pérusse	John Bellefleur	Fiat
1977	Taisto Heinonen	Tom Burgess	Toyota
1978	Taisto Heinonen	Tom Burgess	Toyota
1979	Taisto Heinonen	Tom Burgess	Toyota
1980	Taisto Heinonen	Tom Burgess	Toyota
1981	Randy Black	Bob Lee	Toyota
1982	Taisto Heinonen	Tom Burgess	Toyota
1983	Randy Black	Tom Burgess	Nissan
1984	Tim Bendle	Mary Crundwell	Toyota
1985	Tim Bendle	Louis Belanger	Toyota
1986	Bo Skowronnek	Terry Epp	Volvo
1987	Alain Bergeron	Martin Headland	Toyota
1988	Alain Bergeron	Raymond Cadieux	Toyota
1989	Paul Choiniere	Martin Headland	Audi
1990	Tom McGeer	Trish Sparrow	Audi
1991	Frank Sprongl	Dan Sprongl	Audi
1992	Tom McGeer	Trish Sparrow	Audi
1993	Tom McGeer	Trish Sparrow	Subaru
1994	Frank Sprongl	Dan Sprongl	Audi
1995	Frank Sprongl	Mike Koch	Audi
1996	Carl Merrill	Yorgi Bittner	Eagle
1997	Frank Sprongl	Dan Sprongl	Audi
1998	Frank Sprongl	Dan Sprongl	Audi
1999	Frank Sprongl	Dan Sprongl	Audi
2000	Tom McGeer	Mark Williams	Subaru
2001	Tom McGeer	Mark Williams	Subaru
2002	Patrick Richard	Ian McCurdy	Subaru
2003	Tom McGeer	Philip Erickson	Subaru
2004	Patrick Richard	Nathalie Richard	Subaru
2005	Peter Thomson	Rod Hendrickson	Subaru
2006	Antoine L'Estage	Ole Holter	Hyundai
2007	Antoine L'Estage	Nathalie Richard	Hyundai
2008	Patrick Richard	Alan Ockwell	Subaru
2009	Patrick Richard	Alan Ockwell	Subaru
2010	Antoine L'Estage	Nathalie Richard	Mitsubishi
2011	Antoine L'Estage	Nathalie Richard	Mitsubishi
2012	Antoine L'Estage	Nathalie Richard	Mitsubishi
2013	Antoine L'Estage	Nathalie Richard	Mitsubishi
2014	Antoine L'Estage	Alan Ockwell	Mitsubishi
2015	Antoine L'Estage	Alan Ockwell	Subaru
2016	Antoine L'Estage	Darren Garrod	Subaru
2017	Antoine L'Estage	Alan Ockwell	Subaru
2018	Karel Carré	Samuel Joyal	Subaru
2019	Karel Carré	Samuel Joyal	Subaru
2021	André Leblanc	René Leblanc	Subaru
2022	Jerome Mailloux	Philippe Poirier	Subaru
2023	Jean-Sébastien Besner	Yvan Joyal	Ford
2024	Jean-Sébastien Besner	Alan Ockwell	Ford
2025	Ricardo Cordero	Marco Hernandez	Citroen

=== Canadian Performance Rally Lifetime Standings ===
The following standings are based on an individual's placings in the first six overall positions on all Canadian Championship Performance Rallies from 1973 to 2024. There are 14 drivers and 10 co-drivers who have attained Grand Master status (>2000 points)

Driver
Driver	Lifetime Points	CARS Points	Career Wins
Antoine L'Estage	7060	1568	57
Taisto Heinonen	5580	1110	40
Frank Sprongl	5060	1079	36
Tom McGeer	4990	1053	21
John Buffum	4900	778	43
Patrick Richard	4160	894	22
Jean-Paul Perusse	3860	784	21
Walter Boyce	2920	593	12
Randy Black	2880	570	10
Jean-Sebastian Besner	2560	608	4
Sylvain Vincent	2540	571	1
Bo Skowronnek	2390	503	5
Carl Merril	2350	382	8
Bjorn Anderson	2120	420	6

Co-Driver
Driver	Lifetime Points	CARS Points	Career Wins
Tom Burgess	6080	1211	39
Dan Sprongl	4520	967	32
Nathalie Richard	3930	875	29
John Bellefleur	3930	765	20
Alan Ockwell	3770	863	29
Trish McGeer	2860	636	5
Yvan Joyal	2280	588	5
Martin Headland	2250	509	7
Gilles Lacroix	2140	561	3
Mark Williams	2050	361	17

=== Top 10 Canadian Rally Championship ===
Most Championship
	Driver	Total
1	(Canada) Antoine L'Estage	10
2	(Canada) Frank Spongl	6
2	(Canada) Tom McGeer	6
4	(Finland) Taisto Heinonen	5
4	(Canada) Walter Boyce	5
6	(Canada) Patrick Richard	4
7	(Canada) Jean-Sébastian Besner	2
7	(Canada) Randy Black	2
7	(Canada) Karel Carré	2
7	(Canada) Alain Bergeron	2

Most Wins
	Driver	Total
1	(Canada) Antoine L'Estage	57
2	(United States) John Buffum	43
3	(Finland) Taisto Heinonen	40
4	(Canada) Frank Sprongl	36
5	(Canada) Patrick Richard	22
6	(Canada) Tom McGeer	21
6	(Canada) Jean-Paul Pérusse	21
8	(Canada) Walter Boyce	12
9	(Canada) Tim Bendle	11
10	(Canada) Randy Black	10

Most Manufacturers Titles
	Manufacturer	Total
1	(Japan) Subaru	18
2	(Japan) Toyota	11
3	(Germany) Audi	8
4	(Japan) Mitsubishi	6
5	(Germany) Volkswagen	5
6	(Japan) Datsun	4
7	(Italy) Fiat	3
8	(South Korea) Hyundai	2
8	(Sweden) Volvo	2
8	(United States) Ford	2

== Past results ==
=== 2025 ===
Round	Event	Winning driver	Winning co-driver	Winning car	Winning time
1	(Quebec) Rallye Perce-Neige de Maniwaki	(Canada) Jean-Sébastian Besner	(Canada) Yvan Joyal	(United States) Ford Fiesta R5	1:52:04.1
2	(British Columbia) Pacific Forest Rally	(Mexico) Ricardo Cordero	(Mexico) Marco Herández	(France) Citroën C3 Rally2	1:33:17.2
3	(Quebec) Rallye Auto International Baie-des-Chaleurs	(Sweden) Calle Carlberg	(Sweden) Torbjörn Carlberg	(France) Peugeot 208 Rally4	2:11:57.0
4	(Quebec) Rallye Défi Petite Nation	(Canada) Jean-Sébastian Besner	(Canada) Yvan Joyal	(United States) Ford Fiesta R5	1:44:37.4
5	(British Columbia) Rocky Mountain Rally	Cancelled	Cancelled	Cancelled	Cancelled
6	(Quebec) Rallye de Charlevoix	(Canada) Simon Vincent	(Canada) Hubert Gaudreau	(Japan) Subaru Impreza	1:50:29.4
7	(Ontario) Novus Automotive Rally of the Tall Pines	(Mexico) Ricardo Cordero	(Mexico) Marco Herández	(France) Citroën C3 Rally2	1:43:21.7
8	(British Columbia) Big White Winter Rally	(Mexico) Ricardo Cordero	(Mexico) Marco Herández	(France) Citroën C3 Rally2	1:43:18.7

=== 2024 ===
Round	Event	Winning driver	Winning co-driver	Winning car	Winning time
1	(Quebec) Rallye Perce-Neige de Maniwaki	(Canada) Antoine L'Estage	(Canada) Alan Ockwell	(United States) Ford Fiesta Proto	2:42:17.8
2	(British Columbia) Rocky Mountain Rally	(Canada) Jérôme Mailloux	(Canada) Philippe Poirier	(Japan) Subaru Impreza STi N14	1:48:18.3
3	(British Columbia) Pacific Forest Rally	(Canada) Antoine L'Estage	(Canada) Alan Ockwell	(United States) Ford Fiesta Proto	1:18:48.0
4	(Quebec) Rallye Auto International Baie-des-Chaleurs	(Mexico) Alejandro Mauro	(Mexico) Andrián Pérez	(Czechoslovakia) Škoda Fabia Rally2 evo	2:02:36.2
5	(Quebec) Rallye Défi Petite Nation	(Canada) Jérôme Mailloux	(Canada) Philippe Poirier	(Japan) Subaru Impreza STi N14	1:52:18.2
6	(Quebec) Rallye de Charlevoix	(Canada) Antoine L'Estage	(Canada) Alan Ockwell	(United States) Ford Fiesta Proto	1:43:09.2
7	(Ontario) Lincoln Electric Rally of the Tall Pines	(Canada) Jean-Sébastian Besner	(Canada) Yvan Joyal	(United States) Ford Fiesta R5	1:36:51.7
8	(British Columbia) Big White Winter Rally	(Mexico) Ricardo Cordero	(Mexico) Marco Herández	(France) Citroën C3 Rally2	2:21:23.4

=== 2023 ===
Round	Event	Winning driver	Winning co-driver	Winning car	Winning time
1	(Quebec) Rallye Perce-Neige de Maniwaki	(Canada) Alexandre Moreau	(Canada) Ian Guité	(Japan) Subaru Impreza STi N12	2:00:46.9
2	(British Columbia) Rocky Mountain Rally	(Canada) Tanveer Deen	(Canada) Naila Deen	(Japan) Mitsubishi Lancer Evo IX	1:43:19.1
3	(Quebec) Rallye Auto International Baie-des-Chaleurs	(Canada) Joël Levac	(Canada) Laurence-Fanny L'Estage	(United Kingdom) Mini John Cooper Works WRC	2:06:42.9
4	(Quebec) Rallye Défi Petite Nation	(Canada) Jean-Sébastian Besner	(Canada) Yvan Joyal	(United States) Ford Fiesta R5	1:57:27.9
5	(British Columbia) Pacific Forest Rally (Cancelled)	-	-	-	-
6	(Quebec) Rallye de Charlevoix	(Canada) Simon Vincent	(Canada) Hubert Gaudreau	(Japan) Subaru Impreza RS	2:11:34.4
7	(Ontario) Lincoln Electric Rally of the Tall Pines	(Canada) Jérôme Mailloux	(Canada) Philippe Poirier	(Japan) Subaru Impreza STi N14	1:30:50.5
8	(British Columbia) National Big White Winter Rally	(United States) Samuel Albert	(United States) Krista Skucas	(Japan) Subaru Impreza STi	1:55:43.9

=== 2022 ===
Round	Event	Winning driver	Winning co-driver	Winning car	Winning time
1	(Quebec) Rallye Perce-Neige de Maniwaki	(Canada) Jérôme Mailloux	(Canada) Philippe Poirier	(Japan) Subaru Impreza STi N14	1:11:48.2
2	(British Columbia) Rocky Mountain Rally	(Canada) Tanveer Deen	(Canada) Naila Deen	(Japan) Mitsubishi Lancer Evo IX	1:35:58.82
3	(Quebec) Rallye Auto International Baie-des-Chaleurs	(Mexico) Ricardo Cordero	(Mexico) Marco Hernandez	(France) Citroën C3 Rally2	2:04:38.8
4	(Quebec) Rallye Défi Petite Nation	(Canada) Joël Levac	(France) Florian Barral	(United Kingdom) Mini John Cooper Works WRC	1:42:39.4
5	(British Columbia) Pacific Forest Rally (Cancelled)	-	-	-	-
6	(Quebec) Rallye de Charlevoix	(Canada) Jérôme Mailloux	(Canada) Philippe Poirier	(Japan) Subaru Impreza STi N14	1:56:07.2
7	(Ontario) Lincoln Electric Rally of the Tall Pines	(Canada) Jérôme Mailloux	(Canada) Philippe Poirier	(Japan) Subaru Impreza STi N14	1:54:06.9
8	(British Columbia) National Big White Winter Rally	(United States) Matthew Dickinson	(Canada) Chris Kremer	(Japan) Subaru WRX STI	1:57:55.3

=== 2021 ===
Round	Event	Winning driver	Winning co-driver	Winning car	Winning time
1	(Quebec) Rallye Perce-Neige de Maniwaki (Cancelled)	-	-	-	-
2	(Quebec) Rallye Auto International Baie-des-Chaleurs	(Canada) Joël Levac	(Canada) Laurence-Fanny L'Estage	(United Kingdom) Mini John Cooper Works WRC	1:52:42.1
3	(Quebec) Rallye Défi Petite Nation	(Canada) Jérôme Mailloux	(Canada) Philippe Poirier	(Japan) Subaru Impreza STi N14	2:03:33.3
4	(British Columbia) Rocky Mountain Rally	(Canada) André Leblanc	(Canada) René Leblanc	(Japan) Subaru Impreza STi N10	1:41:06.1
5	(British Columbia) Pacific Forest Rally (Cancelled)	-	-	-	-
6	(Quebec) Rallye de Charlevoix	(Canada) Marc-André Brisebois	(Canada) Marie-France Desmarais Trepani	(Japan) Subaru Impreza STi N12	1:53:48.1
7	(Ontario) Lincoln Electric Rally of the Tall Pines	(Canada) André Leblanc	(Canada) René Leblanc	(Japan) Subaru Impreza STi N10	1:21:16.4
8	(British Columbia) Big White Winter Rally	(United Kingdom) Kyle Tilley	(Italy) Alessandro Gelsomino	(United States) Ford Fiesta Rally2	1:59:02.9

=== 2020 ===
Round	Event	Winning driver	Winning co-driver	Winning car	Winning time
1	(Quebec) Rallye Perce-Neige de Maniwaki	(Canada) Karel Carré	(Canada) Hubert Gaudreau	(Japan) Subaru Impreza STi N12	2:24:48.6
2	(Quebec) Rallye Auto International Baie-des-Chaleurs (Cancelled)	-	-	-	-
3	(Quebec) Rallye Défi Petite Nation (Cancelled)	-	-	-	-
4	(British Columbia) Rocky Mountain Rally (Cancelled)	-	-	-	-
5	(British Columbia) Pacific Forest Rally (Cancelled)	-	-	-	-
6	(Quebec) Rallye de Charlevoix (Cancelled)	-	-	-	-
7	(Ontario) Lincoln Electric Rally of the Tall Pines (Cancelled)	-	-	-	-
8	(British Columbia) Big White Winter Rally (Cancelled)	-	-	-	-

=== 2019 ===
Round	Event	Winning driver	Winning co-driver	Winning car	Winning time
1	(Quebec) Rallye Perce-Neige de Maniwaki	(Canada) Antoine L'Estage	(Canada) Alan Ockwell	(Japan) Subaru Impreza STi N11 Spec C	2:36:55.2
2	(British Columbia) Rocky Mountain Rally	(Canada) Brandon Semenuk	(Canada) John Hall	(United States) Ford Fiesta R5	1:41:06.1
3	(Quebec) Rallye Auto International Baie-des-Chaleurs	(Canada) Joël Levac	(Canada) Stéphanie Lewis	(United Kingdom) Mini John Cooper Works WRC	2:19:52.3
4	(Quebec) Rallye Défi Petite Nation	(Canada) Karel Carré	(Canada) Samuel Joyal	(Japan) Subaru Impreza STi N12	1:45:12.5
5	(British Columbia) Pacific Forest Rally	(Canada) Karel Carré	(Canada) Samuel Joyal	(Japan) Subaru Impreza STi N12	1:50:57.6
6	(Quebec) Rallye de Charlevoix	(Canada) Nicolas Laverdière	(Canada) Vincent Trudel	(Japan) Mitsubishi Lancer Evo VIII	1:59:29.0
7	(Ontario) Lincoln Electric Rally of the Tall Pines	(Russia) Leonid Urlichich Crazy Leo	(Russia) Tatiana Nikolaeva	(Japan) Subaru Impreza STi N12	2:00:48.1
8	(British Columbia) Big White Winter Rally	(Canada) Brandon Semenuk	(Canada) John Hall	(United States) Ford Fiesta R5	2:04:33.8

=== 2018 ===
Round	Event	Winning driver	Winning co-driver	Winning car	Winning time
1	(Quebec) Rallye Perce-Neige de Maniwaki	(Canada) Karel Carré	(Canada) Samuel Joyal	(Japan) Subaru Impreza STi N12	2:31:51.5
2	(British Columbia) Rocky Mountain Rally	(Canada) Antoine L'Estage	(Canada) Alan Ockwell	(Japan) Subaru WRX STI	1:47:39.3
3	(Quebec) Rallye Baie-des-Chaleurs	(Canada) Jean-Sébastian Besner	(Canada) Yvan Joyal	(Japan) Mitsubishi Lancer Evo VIII	2:32:48.3
4	(Quebec) Rallye Défi	(Canada) Joël Levac	(Canada) Stéphanie Lewis	(United Kingdom) Mini John Cooper Works WRC	1:46:07.7
5	(British Columbia) Pacific Forest Rally	(Canada) Karel Carré	(Canada) Samuel Joyal	(Japan) Subaru Impreza STi N12	1:51:31.0
6	(Ontario) Lincoln Electric Rally of the Tall Pines	(Canada) Karel Carré	(Canada) Samuel Joyal	(Japan) Subaru Impreza STi N12	1:51:31.0
7	(British Columbia) The Big White Winter Rally	(Canada) Brandon Semenuk	(Canada) John Hall	(Japan) Subaru Crosstrek	2:07:01.6

=== 2017 ===
Round	Event	Winning driver	Winning co-driver	Winning car	Winning time
1	(Quebec) Rallye Perce-Neige Maniwaki	(United Kingdom) David Higgins	(United Kingdom) Craig Drew	(Japan) Subaru WRX STI	2:19:09.1
2	(British Columbia) Rocky Mountain Rally	(Canada) Brandon Semenuk	(Canada) John Hall	(Japan) Subaru Crosstrek	1:43:38.9
3	(Quebec) Rallye Baie-des-Chaleurs	(Canada) Antoine L'Estage	(Canada) Alan Ockwell	(Japan) Subaru WRX STI	2:07:14.0
4	(Quebec) Rallye Défi	(Canada) Antoine L'Estage	(Canada) Alan Ockwell	(Japan) Subaru WRX STI	2:00:09.0
5	(British Columbia) Pacific Forest Rally	(Canada) Antoine L'Estage	(Canada) Alan Ockwell	(Japan) Subaru WRX STI	1:14:59.0
6	(Ontario) Lincoln Electric Rally of the Tall Pines	(Canada) Antoine L'Estage	(Canada) Alan Ockwell	(Japan) Subaru WRX STI	1:49:38.9
7	(British Columbia) Big White Winter Rally	(Canada) Antoine L'Estage	(Canada) Alan Ockwell	(Japan) Subaru WRX STI	1:58:44.9

=== 2016 ===
Round	Event	Winning driver	Winning co-driver	Winning car	Winning time
1	(Quebec) Rallye Perce-Neige Maniwaki	(Canada) Maxime Labrie	(Canada) Robert Labrie	(Japan) Subaru Impreza STi N10	2:29:02.8
2	(British Columbia) Rocky Mountain Rally	(Canada) Antoine L'Estage	(United Kingdom) Darren Garrod	(Japan) Subaru WRX STI	1:39:12.8
3	(Quebec) Rallye Baie-des-Chaleurs	(Canada) Joël Levac	(Canada) Stéphanie Lewis	(United Kingdom) Mini John Cooper Works WRC	2:09:59.5
4	(Quebec) Rallye Défi	(Canada) Marc Bourassa	(Canada) Daniel Paquette	(Japan) Subaru Impreza STi N10	1:15:51.9
5	(British Columbia) Pacific Forest Rally	(Canada) Antoine L'Estage	(United Kingdom) Dallen Garrod	(Japan) Subaru WRX STI	1:34:10.0
6	(Ontario) Rally of the Tall Pines	(Canada) Antoine L'Estage	(United Kingdom) Dallen Garrod	(Japan) Subaru WRX STI	2:06:45.3
7	(British Columbia) Big White Winter Rally	(Canada) Antoine L'Estage	(United Kingdom) Dallen Garrod	(Japan) Subaru WRX STI	2:08:51.1

=== 2015 ===
Round	Event	Winning driver	Winning co-driver	Winning car	Winning time
1	(Quebec) Rallye Perce-Neige Maniwaki	(Canada) Antoine L'Estage	(Canada) Alan Ockwell	(Japan) Subaru WRX STI	2:22:51.1
2	(Quebec) Rallye Baie-des-Chaleurs	(Canada) Antoine L'Estage	(Canada) Alan Ockwell	(Japan) Subaru WRX STI	2:03:25.1
3	(Quebec) Rallye Défi	(Canada) Joël Levac	(Canada) Stéphanie Lewis	(United Kingdom) Mini John Cooper Works WRC	1:37:54.2
4	(British Columbia) Pacific Forest Rally	(Canada) Antoine L'Estage	(Canada) Alan Ockwell	(Japan) Subaru WRX STI	1:25:00.4
5	(British Columbia) Rocky Mountain Rally	(Canada) Antoine L'Estage	(Canada) Alan Ockwell	(Japan) Subaru WRX STI	1:13:27.7
6	(Ontario) Rally of the Tall Pines	(Canada) Sylvain Vincent	(Canada) Simon Vincent	(Japan) Subaru Impreza RS	1:59:09.5

=== 2014 ===
Round	Event	Winning driver	Winning co-driver	Winning car	Winning time
1	(Quebec) Rallye Perce-Neige Maniwaki	(Canada) Antoine L'Estage	(Canada) John Hall	(Japan) Mitsubishi Lancer Evo X	2:28:45.4
2	(Quebec) Rallye Automobile Baie-des-Chaleurs	(Canada) Antoine L'Estage	(Canada) Alan Ockwell	(Japan) Mitsubishi Lancer Evo X	2:05:38.1
3	(Quebec) Rallye Défi	(Canada) Antoine L'Estage	(Canada) Alan Ockwell	(Japan) Mitsubishi Lancer Evo X	1:30:01.8
4	(British Columbia) Pacific Forest Rally	(Canada) Antoine L'Estage	(Canada) Alan Ockwell	(Japan) Mitsubishi Lancer Evo X	1:21:46.0
5	(British Columbia) Rocky Mountain Rally	(Canada) Antoine L'Estage	(Canada) Alan Ockwell	(Japan) Mitsubishi Lancer Evo X	1:44:57.1
6	(Ontario) Rally of the Tall Pines	(Canada) Antoine L'Estage	(Canada) Alan Ockwell	(Japan) Mitsubishi Lancer Evo X	1:48:34.3

=== 2013 ===
Round	Event	Winning driver	Winning co-driver	Winning car	Winning time
1	(Quebec) Rallye Perce-Neige Maniwaki	(Canada) Patrick Richard	(United Kingdom) Robert Fagg	(Japan) Subaru Impreza STi N14	2:12:19.5
2	(Quebec) Rallye Auto Baie-des-Chaleurs	(Canada) Antoine L'Estage	(Canada) Nathalie Richard	(Japan) Mitsubishi Lancer Evo X	1:39:03.0
3	(Quebec) Rallye Défi	(Canada) Antoine L'Estage	(Republic of Ireland) Karl Atkinson	(Japan) Mitsubishi Lancer Evo X	1:33:48.7
4	(British Columbia) Pacific Forest Rally	(Canada) Antoine L'Estage	(United Kingdom) Craig Parry	(Japan) Mitsubishi Lancer Evo X	1:19:21.3
5	(British Columbia) Rocky Mountain Rally	(Canada) Antoine L'Estage	(United Kingdom) Craig Parry	(Japan) Mitsubishi Lancer Evo X	1:42:39.6
6	(Ontario) Rally of the Tall Pines	(Canada) Christopher Martin	(United States) Brian Johnson	(Japan) Subaru Impreza RS	2:17:21.0

=== 2012 ===
Round	Event	Winning driver	Winning co-driver	Winning car	Winning time
1	(Quebec) Rallye Perce-Neige Maniwaki	(Canada) Antoine L'Estage	(Canada) Nathalie Richard	(Japan) Mitsubishi Lancer Evo X	2:45:18.8
2	(British Columbia) Rocky Mountain Rally	(Canada) Antoine L'Estage	(Canada) Nathalie Richard	(Japan) Mitsubishi Lancer Evo X	1:22:24.4
3	(Quebec) Rallye Auto Baie-des-Chaleurs	(Canada) Antoine L'Estage	(Canada) Nathalie Richard	(Japan) Mitsubishi Lancer Evo X	1:28:31.5
4	(Quebec) Rallye Défi	(United States) Ken Block	(Italy) Alessandro Gelsomino	(United States) Ford Fiesta RS Open	1:33:26.0
5	(British Columbia) Pacific Forest Rally	(Canada) Antoine L'Estage	(Canada) Nathalie Richard	(Japan) Mitsubishi Lancer Evo X	1:31:59.6
6	(Ontario) Rally of the Tall Pines	(Canada) Patrick Richard	(Canada) Alan Ockwell	(Japan) Subaru Impreza STi N14	1:46:18.4

=== 2011 ===
Round	Event	Winning driver	Winning co-driver	Winning car	Winning time
1	(Quebec) Rallye Perce-Neige Maniwaki	(Canada) Antoine L'Estage	(Canada) Nathalie Richard	(Japan) Mitsubishi Lancer Evo X	2:22:33.6
2	(Alberta) Rocky Mountain Rally	(Canada) Antoine L'Estage	(Canada) Nathalie Richard	(Japan) Mitsubishi Lancer Evo X	0:43:23.6
3	(Quebec) Rallye Auto Baie-des-Chaleurs	(Canada) Antoine L'Estage	(Canada) Nathalie Richard	(Japan) Mitsubishi Lancer Evo X	1:58:10.1
4	(Quebec) Rallye Défi	(Canada) Antoine L'Estage	(Canada) Nathalie Richard	(Japan) Mitsubishi Lancer Evo X	1:17:28.0
5	(British Columbia) Pacific Forest Rally	(Canada) Patrick Richard	(Canada) Alan Ockwell	(Japan) Subaru Impreza STi N14	1:19:49.6
6	(Ontario) Rally of the Tall Pines	(Russia) Leonid Urlichich Crazy Leo	(Republic of Ireland) Martin Brady	(Japan) Subaru Impreza STi N12	1:59:04.8

=== 2010 ===
Round	Event	Winning driver	Winning co-driver	Winning car	Winning time
1	(Quebec) Rallye Perce-Neige Maniwaki	(Canada) Bruno Carré	(Canada) Yvan Joyal	(Japan) Subaru Impreza WRX STi	2:26:17.0
2	(Alberta) Rocky Mountain Rally	(Canada) Antoine L'Estage	(Canada) Nathalie Richard	(Japan) Mitsubishi Lancer Evo X	1:11:48.8
3	(Quebec) Rallye Auto Baie-des-Chaleurs	(Canada) Patrick Richard	(Canada) Alan Ockwell	(Japan) Subaru Impreza STi N14	1:19:49.6
4	(Quebec) Rallye Défi	(Canada) Antoine L'Estage	(Canada) Nathalie Richard	(Japan) Mitsubishi Lancer Evo X	1:09:51.0
5	(British Columbia) Pacific Forest Rally	(Canada) Antoine L'Estage	(Canada) Nathalie Richard	(Japan) Mitsubishi Lancer Evo X	1:20:13.0
6	(Ontario) Rally of the Tall Pines	(Canada) Antoine L'Estage	(Canada) Nathalie Richard	(Japan) Mitsubishi Lancer Evo X	1:47:43.0

=== 2009 ===
Round	Event	Winning driver	Winning co-driver	Winning car	Winning time
1	(Quebec) Rallye Perce-Neige-Maniwaki	(Canada) Antoine L'Estage	(Canada) Nathalie Richard	(Japan) Mitsubishi Lancer Evo X	1:59:17.0
2	(Alberta) Rocky Mountain Rally	(Canada) Patrick Richard	(Canada) Alan Ockwell	(Japan) Subaru Impreza STi N14	1:32:34.0
3	(Quebec) Rallye Baie-des-Chaleurs	(Canada) Patrick Richard	(Canada) Alan Ockwell	(Japan) Subaru Impreza STi N14	1:34:48.0
4	(Quebec) Rallye Défi	(Canada) Antoine L'Estage	(Canada) Nathalie Richard	(Japan) Mitsubishi Lancer Evo X	1:11:20.0
5	(British Columbia) Pacific Forest Rally	(Canada) Patrick Richard	(Canada) Alan Ockwell	(Japan) Subaru Impreza STi N14	1:26:12.4
6	(Ontario) Rally of the Tall Pines	(Canada) Patrick Richard	(Canada) Alan Ockwell	(Japan) Subaru Impreza STi N14	1:53:48.0

=== 2008 ===
Round	Event	Winning driver	Winning co-driver	Winning car	Winning time
1	(Quebec) Rallye Perce-Neige Maniwaki	(Canada) Antoine L'Estage	(Canada) Nathalie Richard	(South Korea) Hyundai Tiburon	2:44:20.0
2	(Alberta) Rocky Mountain Rally	(Canada) Patrick Richard	(Canada) Alan Ockwell	(Japan) Subaru Impreza WRX STi	1:26:43.8
3	(Quebec) Rallye Baie-des-Chaleurs	(United States) Ken Block	(Italy) Alessandro Gelsomino	(Japan) Subaru Impreza STi N14	1:54:27.0
4	(Quebec) Rallye Défi	(Canada) Patrick Richard	(Canada) Alan Ockwell	(Japan) Subaru Impreza WRX STi	1:08:27.0
5	(British Columbia) Pacific Forest Rally	(Canada) Antoine L'Estage	(Canada) Nathalie Richard	(South Korea) Hyundai Tiburon	1:47:22.3
6	(Ontario) Rally of the Tall Pines	(Canada) Patrick Richard	(Canada) Alan Ockwell	(Japan) Subaru Impreza STi N14	1:39:34.0

=== 2007 ===
Round	Event	Winning driver	Winning co-driver	Winning car	Winning time
1	(Quebec) Rallye Perce-Neige Maniwaki	(Canada) Andrew Comrie-Picard	(United States) Marc Goldfarb	(Japan) Mitsubishi Lancer Evo IX	2:11:54.0
2	(Alberta) Rocky Mountain Rally	(Canada) Antoine L'Estage	(Canada) Nathalie Richard	(South Korea) Hyundai Tiburon	1:38:23.0
3	(Quebec) Rallye Baie-des-Chaleurs	(Canada) Antoine L'Estage	(Canada) Nathalie Richard	(South Korea) Hyundai Tiburon	1:49:56.0
4	(Quebec) Défi Ste-Agathe/Duhamel	(Canada) Antoine L'Estage	(Canada) Nathalie Richard	(South Korea) Hyundai Tiburon	1:21:44.0
5	(British Columbia) Pacific Forest Rally	(Canada) Antoine L'Estage	(Canada) Nathalie Richard	(South Korea) Hyundai Tiburon	1:49:30.0
6	(Ontario) Rally of the Tall Pines	(Canada) Antoine L'Estage	(Canada) Nathalie Richard	(South Korea) Hyundai Tiburon	2:00:22.0

=== 2006 ===
Round	Event	Winning driver	Winning co-driver	Winning car	Winning time
1	(Quebec) Rallye Perce-Neige Maniwaki	(Canada) Antoine L'Estage	(United States) Mark Williams	(South Korea) Hyundai Tiburon	2:28:25.0
2	(Alberta) Rocky Mountain Rally	(Canada) Antoine L'Estage	(United States) Mark Williams	(South Korea) Hyundai Tiburon	1:13:17.0
3	(Quebec) Rallye Baie-des-Chaleurs	(United States) Matthew Iorio	(United States) Ole Holter	(Japan) Subaru Impreza WRX	1:51:08.0
4	(Quebec) Défi Ste-Agathe/Duhamel	(Canada) Antoine L'Estage	(Canada) Nathalie Richard	(South Korea) Hyundai Tiburon	1:59:06.0
5	(British Columbia) Pacific Forest Rally	(United States) Matthew Iorio	(United States) Ole Holter	(Japan) Subaru Impreza WRX	1:42:22.0
6	(Ontario) Rally of the Tall Pines	(Canada) Antoine L'Estage	(Canada) Nathalie Richard	(South Korea) Hyundai Tiburon	1:46:28.0

=== 2005 ===
Round	Event	Winning driver	Winning co-driver	Winning car	Winning time
1	(Quebec) Rallye Perce-Neige	(Canada) Peter Thomson	(United States) Rod Hendricksen	(Japan) Subaru Impreza WRX	2:39:39.0
2	(Alberta) Rocky Mountain Rally	(Canada) Peter Thomson	(United States) Rod Hendricksen	(Japan) Subaru Impreza WRX	1:45:56.0
3	(Quebec) Rallye Baie-des-Chaleurs	(Canada) Antoine L'Estage	(Canada) Brian Maxwell	(South Korea) Hyundai Tiburon	1:47:36.0
4	(Quebec) Défi Ste-Agathe/Duhamel	(Canada) Antoine L'Estage	(Canada) Yanick Napert	(South Korea) Hyundai Tiburon	1:43:26.0
5	(British Columbia) Pacific Forest Rally	(Canada) Antoine L'Estage	(Canada) Yanick Napert	(South Korea) Hyundai Tiburon	1:35:20.0
6	(Ontario) Rally of the Tall Pines	(United States) John Buffum	(Canada) Nathalie Richard	(South Korea) Hyundai Tiburon	1:54:17.0

=== 2004 ===
Round	Event	Winning driver	Winning co-driver	Winning car	Winning time
1	(Quebec) Rallye Perce-Neige	(Canada) Patrick Richard	(Sweden) Björn Christian Edström	(Japan) Subaru Impreza WRX	2:26:13.0
2	(Alberta) Rocky Mountain Rally	(Canada) Patrick Richard	(Canada) Nathalie Richard	(Japan) Subaru Impreza WRX	1:28:34.0
3	(Quebec) Rallye Baie-des-Chaleurs	(Canada) Patrick Richard	(Canada) Nathalie Richard	(Japan) Subaru Impreza WRX	1:53:52.0
4	(Quebec) Rallye Défi Ste-Agathe/Duhamel	(Canada) Patrick Richard	(Canada) Nathalie Richard	(Japan) Subaru Impreza WRX	1:26:01.0
5	(British Columbia) Pacific Forest Rally	(Canada) Patrick Richard	(Canada) Nathalie Richard	(Japan) Subaru Impreza WRX	1:45:13.0
6	(Ontario) Rally of the Tall Pines	(Canada) Antoine L'Estage	(Canada) Yanick Napert	(South Korea) Hyundai Tiburon	1:49:31.0

=== 2003 ===
Round	Event	Winning driver	Winning co-driver	Winning car	Winning time
1	(Quebec) Rallye Perce-Neige	(Canada) Sylvain Erickson	(Canada) Philip Erickson	(Japan) Mitsubishi Lancer Evo IV	2:35:59.0
2	(Quebec) Rallye International de Québec	(Canada) Patrick Richard	(Sweden) Mikael Johansson	(Japan) Subaru Impreza WRX	2:21:39.2
3	(Alberta) Big Horn Rally	(Canada) Tom McGeer	(United Kingdom) Howard Davies	(Japan) Subaru Impreza WRX	1:37:09.0
4	(Alberta) Rocky Mountain Rally	(Canada) Tom McGeer	(United Kingdom) Howard Davies	(Japan) Subaru Impreza WRX	1:38:39.0
5	(British Columbia) Pacific Forest Rally	(Canada) Tom McGeer	(United States) Jeffrey Becker	(Japan) Subaru Impreza WRX	2:00:48.0
6	(Quebec) Rallye Baie-des-Chaleurs	(Canada) Patrick Richard	(Canada) Ian McCurdy	(Japan) Subaru Impreza WRX	1:50:51.0
7	(Quebec) Rallye Défi Ste-Agathe	(Canada) Sylvain Erickson	(Canada) Philip Erickson	(Japan) Mitsubishi Lancer Evo IV	1:29:49.0
8	(Ontario) Rally of the Tall Pines	(Canada) Frank Sprongl	(Canada) Brian Maxwell	(Japan) Mitsubishi Lancer Evo VI	1:41:06.0

=== 2002 ===
Round	Event	Winning driver	Winning co-driver	Winning car	Winning time
1	(Quebec) Rallye de Québec	(Canada) Tom McGeer	(United States) Mark Williams	(Japan) Subaru Impreza WRX	2:48:58.0
2	(Quebec) Rallye Perce-Neige	(Canada) Patrick Richard	(Canada) Ian McCurdy	(Japan) Subaru Impreza WRX	2:07:59.0
3	(Alberta) Big Horn Rally	(Canada) Patrick Richard	(Canada) Ian McCurdy	(Japan) Subaru Impreza WRX	1:14:52.0
4	(Alberta) Rocky Mountain Rally	(Canada) Sylvain Erickson	(Canada) Philip Erickson	(Japan) Mitsubishi Lancer Evo IV	1:31:21.0
5	(Quebec) Rallye Baie-des-Chaleurs	(Canada) Tom McGeer	(United States) Mark Williams	(Japan) Subaru Impreza WRX	2:08:58.0
6	(Quebec) Défi Ste-Agathe/Duhamel	(Canada) Patrick Richard	(Canada) Ian McCurdy	(Japan) Subaru Impreza WRX	1:38:11.0
7	(Ontario) Rally of the Voyageurs	(Canada) Patrick Richard	(Canada) Ian McCurdy	(Japan) Subaru Impreza WRX	1:27:32.0
8	(Quebec) Rallye International de Charlevoix	(United States) John Buffum	(United Kingdom) Stephen McAuley	(South Korea) Hyundai Tiburon	3:43:32.1
9	(Ontario) Rally of the Tall Pines	(Canada) Tom McGeer	(United States) Mark Williams	(Japan) Subaru Impreza WRX	1:55:29

=== 2001 ===
Round	Event	Winning driver	Winning co-driver	Winning car	Winning time
1	(Quebec) Rallye de Québec	(Canada) Tom McGeer	(United States) Mark Williams	(Japan) Subaru Impreza WRX	1:44:39.0
2	(Quebec) Rallye Perce-Neige-Maniwaki	(Canada) Sylvain Erickson	(Canada) Philip Erickson	(Japan) Mitsubishi Lancer Evo IV	2:15:27.0
3	(Alberta) Big Horn Rally	(Canada) Tom McGeer	(United States) Mark Williams	(Japan) Subaru Impreza WRX	1:34:57.0
4	(Alberta) Rocky Mountain Rally	(Canada) Tom McGeer	(United States) Mark Williams	(Japan) Subaru Impreza WRX	1:36:51.0
5	(Quebec) Rallye Baie-des-Chaleurs	(Canada) Tom McGeer	(United States) Mark Williams	(Japan) Subaru Impreza WRX	1:58:08.0
6	(Ontario) Rally of the Voyageurs	(Canada) Frank Sprongl	(Canada) Dan Sprongl	(Germany) Audi S2	1:27:32.0
7	(Quebec) Rallye International Charlevoix	(Canada) Tom McGeer	(United States) Mark Williams	(Japan) Subaru Impreza WRX	3:32:56.5
8	(Ontario) Rally of the Tall Pines	(Canada) Tom McGeer	(United States) Mark Williams	(Japan) Subaru Impreza WRX	1:58:07.0

=== 2000 ===
Round	Event	Winning driver	Winning co-driver	Winning car	Winning time
1	(Quebec) Subaru Rallye de Québec	(Canada) Frank Sprongl	(Canada) Dan Sprongl	(Germany) Audi S2	1:40:25.0
2	(Quebec) Subaru Rallye Perce-Neige	(Canada) Tom McGeer	(United States) Mark Williams	(Japan) Subaru Impreza WRX	2:18:40.0
3	(Alberta) Bighorn Rally	(Canada) Frank Sprongl	(Canada) Dan Sprongl	(Germany) Audi S2	1:29:33.0
4	(Alberta) Rocky Mountain Rally	(United States) John Buffum	(United States) Mark Williams	(Japan) Subaru Impreza RS	1:45:29.0
5	(Quebec) Rallye Baie-des-Chaleurs	(Canada) Tom McGeer	(United States) Mark Williams	(Japan) Subaru Impreza WRX	1:49:41.0
6	(Ontario) Rally of the Voyageurs	(Canada) Tom McGeer	(United States) Mark Williams	(Japan) Subaru Impreza WRX	1:39:37.0
7	(Quebec) Rallye International Charlevoix	(Canada) Tom McGeer	(United States) Mark Williams	(Japan) Subaru Impreza WRX	2:14:03.4
8	(Ontario) Rally of the Tall Pines	(Canada) Tom McGeer	(United States) Mark Williams	(Japan) Subaru Impreza WRX	2:03:32.0

=== 1999 ===
Round	Event	Winning driver	Winning co-driver	Winning car	Winning time
1	(Quebec) Rallye de Québec	(Canada) Frank Sprongl	(Canada) Dan Sprongl	(Germany) Audi S2	1:48:27
2	(Quebec) Rallye Perce-Neige	(Canada) Frank Sprongl	(Canada) Dan Sprongl	(Germany) Audi S2	2:27:11
3	(Alberta) Bighorn Rally	(Canada) Frank Sprongl	(Canada) Dan Sprongl	(Germany) Audi S2	1:28:30
4	(Alberta) Rocky Mountain Rally	(Canada) Frank Sprongl	(Canada) Dan Sprongl	(Germany) Audi S2	1:56:33
5	(Quebec) Rallye Baie-des-Chaleurs	(Canada) Frank Sprongl	(Canada) Dan Sprongl	(Germany) Audi S2	2:58:22
6	(Ontario) Rally of the Voyageurs	(Canada) Frank Sprongl	(Canada) Dan Sprongl	(Germany) Audi S2	1:24:01
7	(Quebec) Rallye Auto Charlevoix Export A	(United States) John Buffum	(United States) Lance Smith	(Japan) Mitsubishi Lancer Evo V	1:25:54
8	(Ontario) Rally of the Tall Pines	(Canada) Frank Sprongl	(Canada) Dan Sprongl	(Germany) Audi S2	2:14:28

=== 1998 ===
Round	Event	Winning driver	Winning co-driver	Winning car	Winning time
1	(Quebec) Rallye Perce-Neige (Cancelled)	-	-	-	-
2	(Quebec) Rallye de Québec	(Canada) Frank Sprongl	(Canada) Dan Sprongl	(Germany) Audi S2	2:24:25
3	(Alberta) Bighorn Rally	(Canada) Frank Sprongl	(Canada) Dan Sprongl	(Germany) Audi S2	1:28:05
4	(Alberta) Rocky Mountain Rally	(Canada) Frank Sprongl	(Canada) Dan Sprongl	(Germany) Audi S2	1:36:37
5	(Quebec) Rallye Subaru Yokohama Baie-des-Chaleurs	(Canada) Frank Sprongl	(Canada) Dan Sprongl	(Germany) Audi S2	2:26:03
6	(Ontario) Rally of the Voyageurs	(Canada) Frank Sprongl	(Canada) Dan Sprongl	(Germany) Audi S2	-
7	(Quebec) Rallye Auto Charlevoix	(Canada) Tom McGeer	(Canada) Trish McGeer	(Japan) Subaru Impreza WRX	1:45:17
8	(Ontario) Rally of the Tall Pines	(Canada) Frank Sprongl	(Canada) Dan Sprongl	(Germany) Audi S2	2:09:45

=== 1997 ===
Round	Event	Winning driver	Winning co-driver	Winning car	Winning time
1	(Quebec) Rallye Perce-Neige	(United States) Carl Merrill	(United States) Lance Smith	(United States) Ford Escort RS Cosworth	3:08:09
2	(Quebec) Rallye de Québec Michelin	(Canada) Frank Sprongl	(Canada) Dan Sprongl	(Germany) Audi S2	2:12:05
3	(Alberta) Michelin Bighorn Rally	(Canada) Frank Sprongl	(Canada) Dan Sprongl	(Germany) Audi S2	0:53:30
4	(Alberta) Michelin Rocky Mountain Rally	(United States) Carl Merrill	(United States) Lance Smith	(United States) Ford Escort RS Cosworth	1:50:45
5	(Quebec) Rallye Michelin Baie-des-Chaleurs	(Canada) Frank Sprongl	(Canada) Dan Sprongl	(Germany) Audi S2	2:03:32
6	(Quebec) Rallye Auto Charlevoix Michelin	(Canada) Frank Sprongl	(Canada) Dan Sprongl	(Germany) Audi S2	1:56:50
7	(Ontario) Rally of the Tall Pines	(Canada) Frank Sprongl	(Canada) Dan Sprongl	(Germany) Audi S2	2:30:56

=== 1996 ===
Round	Event	Winning driver	Winning co-driver	Winning car	Winning time
1	(Quebec) Rallye Perce-Neige	(United States) Carl Merrill	(Canada) John Bellefleur	(United States) Ford Escort RS Cosworth	2:23:41
2	(Quebec) Rallye de Québec Michelin	(Canada) Frank Sprongl	(Canada) Dan Sprongl	(Germany) Audi S2	1:33:08
3	(Alberta) Michelin Bighorn Rally	(Canada) Sylvain Erickson	(Canada) Gilles Nault	(United States) Eagle Talon TSi	1:59:02
4	(Alberta) Michelin Rocky Mountain Rally	(Canada) Tim Bendle	(Canada) Art MacKenzie	(United States) Pontiac Fiero	2:15:05
5	(Quebec) Rallye Michelin Baie-des-Chaleurs	(Turkey) Selçuk Karamanoğlu	(United States) George Bittner Yorgi	(United States) Eagle Talon TSi	2:27:16
6	(Ontario) Michelin Rallye of the Voyageurs	(United States) John Buffum	(Canada) Brian Maxwell	(South Korea) Hyundai Elantra	1:13:29
7	(Quebec) Rallye Auto Charlevoix	(Turkey) Selçuk Karamanoğlu	(United States) George Bittner Yorgi	(United States) Eagle Talon TSi	1:30:22
8	(Ontario) Rally of the Tall Pines	(Canada) Frank Sprongl	(Canada) John Bellefleur	(Germany) Audi S2	2:03:22

=== 1995 ===
Round	Event	Winning driver	Winning co-driver	Winning car	Winning time
1	(Quebec) Rallye Perce-Neige Michelin	(Canada) Frank Sprongl	(Canada) Dan Sprongl	(Germany) Audi S2	2:22:46
2	(Quebec) Rallye de Québec Michelin	(Canada) Frank Sprongl	(Canada) Dan Sprongl	(Germany) Audi S2	1:43:28
3	(Alberta) Michelin Bighorn Rally	(Canada) Tim Bendle	(Canada) Greg Hofer	(United States) Pontiac Fiero	2:07:38
4	(Alberta) Michelin Rocky Mountain Rally	(Canada) Yves Barbe	(Canada) Gilles Lacroix	(United States) Eagle Talon TSi	2:12:00
5	(Quebec) Rallye Baie-des-Chaleurs	(United States) John Buffum	(United States) Jeffrey Becker	(South Korea) Hyundai Elantra	1:52:06
6	(Ontario) Michelin Rallye of the Voyageurs	(United States) John Buffum	(United States) Jeffrey Becker	(South Korea) Hyundai Elantra	1:21:46
7	(Quebec) Rallye Auto Charlevoix Michelin	(Canada) Frank Sprongl	(Canada) Brian Maxwell	(Germany) Audi S2	1:58:45
8	(Ontario) Michelin Rally of the Tall Pines	(Canada) Frank Sprongl	(Canada) Sandra Latreille	(Germany) Audi S2	2:11:02

=== 1994 ===
Round	Event	Winning driver	Winning co-driver	Winning car	Winning time
1	Rallye Michelin Quebec/Beauport	(Canada) Frank Sprongl	(Canada) Dan Sprongl	(Germany) Audi S2	
2	(Alberta) Michelin Bighorn Rally	(Canada) Tom McGeer	(Canada) Trish McGeer	(Japan) Subaru Legacy 4WD Turbo	
3	(Quebec) Michelin Rallye Baie-des-Chaleurs	(United States) Carl Merrill	(United States) Jon Wickens	(United States) Ford Escort RS Cosworth	
4	(Nova Scotia) Highlands Rally	?	?	?	
5	(Ontario) Rallye of the Voyageurs	(United States) John Buffum	(United States) Jeffrey Becker	(Germany) Audi S2	1:49:37
6	(Quebec) Rallye Auto Charlevoix	(Canada) Frank Sprongl	(Canada) Dan Sprongl	(Germany) Audi S2	
7	(Ontario) Michelin Rally of the Tall Pines	(Canada) Frank Sprongl	(Canada) Dan Sprongl	(Germany) Audi S2	2:19:26

=== 1993 ===
Round	Event	Winning driver	Winning co-driver	Winning car	Winning time
1	(Quebec) Rallye Perce-Neige	(Canada) Yves Barbe	(Canada) Gilles Lacroix	(United States) Eagle Talon TSi	
2	(Alberta) Big Horn Rally	(Canada) Tom McGeer	(Canada) Trish McGeer	(Japan) Subaru Legacy 4WD Turbo	
3	(Alberta) Rocky Mountain Rally	(Canada) Tim Bendle	(Canada) Olivier Tozser	(Japan) Datsun 510	
4	(Quebec) Rallye Baie-des-Chaleurs	(Canada) Yves Barbe	(Canada) Terry Epp	(United States) Eagle Talon TSi	1:51:53
5	(Nova Scotia) Highlands Rally	(United States) John Buffum	(United States) Carl Merrill	(United States) Ford Escort RS Cosworth	1:57:18
6	(Ontario) Rallye of the Voyageurs	(United States) Carl Merrill	(United States) Jon Wickens	(United States) Ford Escort RS Cosworth	
7	(Quebec) Rallye Auto Charlevoix	(United States) Carl Merrill	(United States) Jon Wickens	(United States) Ford Escort RS Cosworth	
8	(Ontario) Michelin Rally of the Tall Pines	(United States) Paul Choiniere	(United States) Jeffrey Becker	(Germany) Audi S2	

=== 1992 ===
Round	Event	Winning driver	Winning co-driver	Winning car	Winning time
1	(Quebec) Rallye Perce-Neige	(Canada) Michel Poirier-Defoy	(Canada) Pierre Racine	(United States) Eagle Talon TSi	1:59:49
2	(Alberta) Hinton Bighorn Rally	(Greece) Jorge Dascollas	(Canada) Steve Walkington	(Japan) Mazda RX-7	1:46:10
3	(Alberta) Rocky Mountain Rally	(Canada) Frank Sprongl	(Canada) Dan Sprongl	(Germany) Audi Quattro	2:18:01
4	(Quebec) Rallye Baie-des-Chaleurs	(Canada) Tom McGeer	(Canada) Trish McGeer	(Japan) Subaru Legacy 4WD Turbo	1:56:40
5	(Nova Scotia) Dartmouth Highlands Rally	(Canada) Frank Sprongl	(Canada) Dan Sprongl	(Germany) Audi Quattro	1:29:31
6	(Ontario) Rallye of the Voyageurs	(United States) Carl Merrill	(United States) Jon Wickens	(Japan) Mitsubishi Eclipse GSX	1:42:05
7	(Quebec) Rallye Auto Charlevoix	(United States) Carl Merrill	(United States) Jon Wickens	(Japan) Mitsubishi Eclipse GSX	
8	(Ontario) Michelin Rally of the Tall Pines	(Canada) Frank Sprongl	(Canada) Dan Sprongl	(Germany) Audi Quattro	2:24:06

=== 1991 ===
Round	Event	Winning driver	Winning co-driver	Winning car	Winning time
1	(Quebec) Rallye Perce-Neige	(United States) Paul Choiniere	(United States) Doug Nerber	(Germany) Audi Quattro	1:46:56
2	(Alberta) Big Horn Rally	(Poland) Wojtek Grabowski	(Poland) Jerzy Dabrowski	(Japan) Toyota Celica GT-4	1:18:15
3	(Alberta) Rocky Mountain Rally	(Canada) Frank Sprongl	(Canada) Dan Sprongl	(Germany) Audi Quattro	2:04:43
4	(Quebec) Rallye Baie-des-Chaleurs	(United States) Bruno Kreibich	(United States) Jeffrey Becker	(Germany) Audi Quattro	1:36:43
5	(Nova Scotia) Dartmouth Highlands Rally	(Canada) Frank Sprongl	(Canada) Dan Sprongl	(Germany) Audi Quattro	1:37:29
6	(Ontario) Rallye of the Voyageurs	(United States) Bruno Kreibich	(United States) Jeffrey Becker	(Germany) Audi Quattro	1:54:09
7	(Quebec) Rallye Auto Charlevoix	(Canada) Frank Sprongl	(Canada) Dan Sprongl	(Germany) Audi Quattro	1:44:23
8	(Ontario) Michelin Rally of the Tall Pines	(United States) Jim Wilson	(United States) John Buffum	(Japan) Mitsubishi Galant VR-4	2:13:35

=== 1990 ===
Round	Event	Winning driver	Winning co-driver	Winning car	Winning time
1	(Quebec) Rallye Perce-Neige	(Canada) Thierry Ménégoz	(Canada) Louis Bélanger	(Japan) Subaru XT Turbo	3:14:10
2	(Alberta) Rocky Mountain Rally	(Poland) Wojtek Grabowski	(Poland) Jerzy Dabrowski	(Japan) Toyota Celica GT-4	1:26:39
3	(Quebec) Rallye Baie-des-Chaleurs	(United States) Paul Choiniere	(United States) John Buffum	(Germany) Audi Quattro	1:47:22
4	(New Brunswick) Fredericton Moose Challenge	(Canada) Shawn Bishop	(Canada) Suzanne Stewart	(Japan) Mazda 323 4WD	1:44:44
5	(Ontario) Rallye of the Voyageurs	(United States) Bruno Kreibich	(United States) Jeffrey Becker	(Germany) Audi Quattro	2:26:49
6	(Quebec) Rallye Automobile Charlevoix	(United States) John Buffum	(United States) Paul Choiniere	(Germany) Audi Quattro	2:00:12
7	(Ontario) Michelin Rally of the Tall Pines	(United States) Tim O'Neil	(Canada) Martin Headland	(Germany) Volkswagen Golf G60 Rallye	2:21:51

=== 1989 ===
Round	Event	Winning driver	Winning co-driver	Winning car	Winning time
1	(Quebec) Rallye Perce-Neige	(United States) John Buffum	(United States) Tom Grimshaw	(Germany) Audi Quattro	2:57:05
2	(Alberta) Rocky Mountain Rally	(United States) Jeff Zwart	(United States) Col Coatsworth	(Japan) Mazda 323 4WD	
3	(Nova Scotia) Dartmouth Highlands Rally	(United States) Paul Choiniere	(United States) Scott Weinheimer	(Germany) Audi Quattro	1:58:47
4	(Quebec) Rallye Baie-des-Chaleurs	(United States) Paul Choiniere	(United States) John Buffum	(Germany) Audi Quattro	1:53:35
5	(New Brunswick) Fredericton Moose Challenge	(Canada) Philippe Dubé	(Canada) Gilles Lacroix	(Japan) Toyota Corolla GTS	1:21:53
6	(Ontario) Rallye of the Voyageurs	(United States) Paul Choiniere	(United States) Tom Grimshaw	(Germany) Audi Quattro	2:38:04
7	(Quebec) Défi Ste-Agathe (Cancelled)	-	-	-	-
8	(Ontario) Rally of the Tall Pines	(United States) Tim O'Neil	(Canada) Martin Headland	(Germany) Volkswagen Golf II GTi	2:34:19

=== 1988 ===
Round	Event	Winning driver	Winning co-driver	Winning car	Winning time
1	(Quebec) Rallye Perce-Neige	(Canada) Alain Bergeron	(Canada) Raymond Cadieux	(Japan) Toyota Celica	2:57:05
2	(Alberta) Rocky Mountain Rally	(United States) Paul Choiniere	(United States) Scott Weinheimer	(Germany) Audi Quattro	2:40:52
3	(Nova Scotia) Dartmouth Highlands Rally	(United States) Paul Choiniere	(United States) John Buffum	(Germany) Audi Quattro	2:07:19
4	(Quebec) Rallye Baie-des-Chaleurs	(United States) Paul Choiniere	(Canada) Trish McGeer	(Germany) Audi Quattro	1:28:25
5	(New Brunswick) Fredericton Moose Challenge	(Canada) Alain Bergeron	(Canada) Raymond Cadieux	(Japan) Toyota Celica	1:20:05
6	(Ontario) Rallye of the Voyageurs	(United States) Paul Choiniere	(United States) John Buffum	(Germany) Audi Quattro	2:12:50
7	(Quebec) Rallye Défi Ste-Agathe	(United States) Bruno Kreibich	(United States) Clark Bond	(Germany) Audi Quattro	2:52:05
8	(Ontario) Tall Pines Rally	(United States) Tim O'Neil	(Canada) Martin Headland	(Germany) Volkswagen Golf II GTi	2:34:19

=== 1987 ===
Round	Event	Winning driver	Winning co-driver	Winning car	Winning time
1	(Quebec) Rallye Perce-Neige	(United States) John Buffum	(United States) Paul Choiniere	(Germany) Audi Quattro	2:43:05
2	(Alberta) Rocky Mountain Rally	(Canada) Bo Skowronnek	(Canada) Brian Peet	(Sweden) Volvo 242 GLT	2:15:36
3	(Nova Scotia) Dartmouth Highlands Rally	(Canada) Jean-Paul Pérusse	(Canada) Martin Headland	(Germany) Volkswagen Golf II GTi	2:11:56
4	(Ontario) Rallye of the Voyageurs	(United States) Paul Choiniere	(United States) Tom Grimshaw	(Germany) Audi Quattro	2:40:28
5	(New Brunswick) Fredericton Moose Challenge	(United States) John Luttenberg	(Canada) Roderick MacDonald	(Japan) Datsun 510	1:18:13
6	(Quebec) Rallye Défi Ste-Agathe	(United States) John Buffum	(United States) Tom Grimshaw	(Germany) Audi Quattro	3:06:06
7	(Ontario) Tall Pines Rally	(United States) John Buffum	(United States) Tom Grimshaw	(Germany) Audi Quattro	1:27:30

=== 1986 ===
Round	Event	Winning driver	Winning co-driver	Winning car	Winning time
1	(Quebec) Rallye Perce-Neige	(United States) John Buffum	(United States) Tom Grimshaw	(Germany) Audi Quattro	2:31:49
2	(Alberta) Rocky Mountain Rally	(Canada) Bo Skowronnek	(Canada) Terry Epp	(Sweden) Volvo 242 GLT	2:47:25
3	(Quebec) Rallye Baie-des-Chaleurs	(Canada) Bo Skowronnek	(Canada) Terry Epp	(Sweden) Volvo 242 GLT	2:09:07
4	(Nova Scotia) Dartmouth Highlands Rally	(Canada) Bjorn Anderson	(Canada) Brian Jackson	(Japan) Toyota Corolla GTS	2:32:58
5	(New Brunswick) Lobster Rally	(Canada) Bjorn Anderson	(Canada) Brian Jackson	(Japan) Toyota Corolla GTS	1:21:06
6	(Ontario) Rallye of the Voyageurs	(Canada) Bernard Franke	(Canada) Richard Cyr	(Sweden) Volvo 242 Turbo	2:27:51
7	(Quebec) Défi Ste-Agathe	(United States) John Buffum	(United States) Tom Grimshaw	(Germany) Audi Quattro	2:21:13
8	(Ontario) Rally of the Tall Pines	(United States) John Luttenberg	(Canada) Roderick MacDonald	(Japan) Datsun 510	2:30:30

=== 1985 ===
Round	Event	Winning driver	Winning co-driver	Winning car	Winning time
1	(Quebec) Rallye Perce-Neige	(Canada) André Normandin	(Canada) Louis Bélanger	(Japan) Toyota Corolla	3:27:42
2	(Alberta) Rocky Mountain Rally	(Canada) Tim Bendle	(Canada) Steve Farrell	(Japan) Datsun 510	2:43:37
3	(Quebec) Rallye Baie-des-Chaleurs	(Canada) Michel Poirier-Defoy	(Canada) Francois Cyr	(Japan) Toyota Corolla GTS	1:42:33
4	(New Brunswick) Lobster Rally	(Canada) Tim Bendle	(Canada) Art MacKenzie	(Japan) Toyota Corolla GTS	1:19:54
5	(Nova Scotia) Dartmouth Highlands Rally	(United States) John Buffum	(United States) Tom Grimshaw	(Germany) Audi Quattro	1:40:18
6	(Ontario) Rallye of the Voyageurs	(Canada) Bernard Franke	(Canada) Richard Cyr	(Sweden) Volvo 242 Turbo	2:32:43
7	(Quebec) Défi Ste-Agathe	(United States) John Buffum	(United States) Tom Grimshaw	(Germany) Audi Quattro	2:55:59
8	(Ontario) Rally of the Tall Pines	(Canada) Tim Bendle	(Canada) Farouk Amershi	(Japan) Toyota Corolla GTS	2:35:29

=== 1984 ===
Round	Event	Winning driver	Winning co-driver	Winning car	Winning time
1	(Quebec) Rallye Automobile Perce-Neige	(Canada) André Normandin	(Canada) Marie-Thérèse Rousseau	(Japan) Toyota Corolla GTS	4:17:12
2	(Quebec) Rallye Baie-des-Chaleurs	(Canada) Bernard Franke	(Canada) Richard Cyr	(Sweden) Volvo 242 Turbo	1:18:07
3	Nova Scotia Highlands Rally	(Canada) Tim Bendle	(Canada) Mary Crundwell	(Japan) Datsun 510	1:46:47
4	(New Brunswick) Molson National Lobster Rally	(United States) John Buffum	(United States) Paul Choiniere	(Germany) Audi Quattro	1:00:00
5	(Alberta) Rocky Mountain Rally (Cancelled)	-	-	-	-
6	(Ontario) Rallye of the Voyageurs	(Canada) Tim Bendle	(Canada) Mary Crundwell	(Japan) Datsun 510	1:00:34
7	(Quebec) Défi Ste-Agathe	(United States) John Buffum	(United States) Tom Grimshaw	(Germany) Audi Quattro	1:38:22
8	(Ontario) Rally of the Tall Pines	(Canada) Tim Bendle	(Canada) Mary Crundwell	(Japan) Toyota Corolla	2:21:22

=== 1983 ===
Round	Event	Winning driver	Winning co-driver	Winning car	Winning time
1	(Quebec) Rallye Perce-Neige	(Canada) Randy Black	(Canada) Tom Burgess	(Japan) Datsun 510 SSS	2:45:35
2	Ontario Winter Rally	(Canada) Randy Black	(Canada) Tom Burgess	(Japan) Datsun 510 SSS	2:46:35
3	(Quebec) Rallye Pistons les Wapitis	(Canada) Randy Black	(Canada) Tom Burgess	(Japan) Datsun 510 SSS	1:29:40
4	(Quebec) Rallye Baie-des-Chaleurs	(Canada) Randy Black	(Canada) Tom Burgess	(Japan) Datsun 200SX	1:29:40
5	Nova Scotia Highlands Rally	(United States) John Buffum	(United States) Linda Wilcox	(Germany) Volkswagen Rabbit	1:53:18
6	(New Brunswick) Molson Lobster Rally	(United States) John Buffum	(United States) Doug E. Shepherd	(Germany) Audi Quattro	1:01:54
7	(British Columbia) Mountain Trials Rally	(Canada) Tim Bendle	(Canada) Steve Farrell	(Japan) Datsun 510	3:20:41
8	(Alberta) Rocky Mountain Rally	(United States) John Buffum	(United States) Doug E. Shepherd	(Germany) Audi Quattro	1:34:02
9	(Ontario) Rallye of the Voyageurs	(Canada) Bjorn Anderson	(Canada) Brian Jackson	(Japan) Toyota Celica	2:34:06
10	(Ontario) Rally of the Tall Pines	(Canada) Bjorn Anderson	(Canada) Brian Jackson	(Japan) Toyota Celica	2:38:56

=== 1982 ===
Round	Event	Winning driver	Winning co-driver	Winning car	Winning time
1	(Quebec) Rallye Perce-Neige	(Finland) Taisto Heinonen	(Canada) Martin Headland	(Japan) Toyota Corolla	3:39:43
2	Ontario Winter Rally	(Finland) Taisto Heinonen	(Canada) Martin Headland	(Japan) Toyota Corolla	1:57:49
3	(Manitoba) Trail of the Bison Rally	(Finland) Taisto Heinonen	(Canada) Martin Headland	(Japan) Toyota Corolla	1:38:47
4	(Quebec) Rallye Baie-des-Chaleurs	(Finland) Taisto Heinonen	(Canada) Martin Headland	(Japan) Toyota Corolla	1:08:47
5	Nova Scotia Highlands Rally	(Canada) Bjorn Anderson	(Canada) Brian Jackson	(Japan) Toyota Celica	1:35:43
6	(New Brunswick) Molson International Lobster Rally	(United States) John Buffum	(United States) Doug E. Shepherd	(Germany) Audi Quattro	1:17:01
7	(Alberta) Rocky Mountain Rally	(United States) John Nixon	(United States) Lynn Nixon	(Japan) Toyota Celica	2:32:23
8	(British Columbia) Mountain Trials Rally	(New Zealand) Clive Smith	(Canada) Walter Leemans	(Japan) Datsun 510	2:48:35
9	(British Columbia) Pacific Forest Rally	(Finland) Taisto Heinonen	(Canada) Lynn Nixon	(Japan) Toyota Corolla	1:41:46
10	(Ontario) Muskoka Rally	(Finland) Taisto Heinonen	(Canada) Lynn Nixon	(Japan) Toyota Corolla	1:20:02
11	(Ontario) Rally of the Tall Pines	(Canada) Randy Black	(Canada) Tom Burgess	(Japan) Datsun 200SX	1:59:48

=== 1981 ===
Round	Event	Winning driver	Winning co-driver	Winning car	Winning time
1	(Quebec) Rallye Perce-Neige	(Finland) Taisto Heinonen	(Canada) Tom Burgess	(Japan) Toyota Corolla	3:24:47
2	Ontario Winter Rally	(Canada) Randy Black	(Canada) Robert Lee	(Japan) Datsun 510 SSS	2:00:42
3	(British Columbia) Pacific Forest Rally	(Canada) Randy Black	(Canada) Robert Lee	(Japan) Datsun 510 SSS	1:32:08
4	(Quebec) Rallye Pistons les Wapitis	(Finland) Taisto Heinonen	(Canada) Tom Burgess	(Japan) Toyota Corolla	2:02:42
5	(Quebec) Rallye Baie-des-Chaleurs	(Canada) Bjorn Anderson	(Canada) Doug Ort	(Japan) Toyota Celica	1:51:56
6	Nova Scotia Highlands Rally	(Finland) Taisto Heinonen	(Canada) Tom Burgess	(Japan) Toyota Corolla	1:36:32
7	(New Brunswick) Lobster Rally	(Finland) Taisto Heinonen	(Canada) Tom Burgess	(Japan) Toyota Corolla	1:22:13
8	(Alberta) Rocky Mountain Rally	(Finland) Taisto Heinonen	(Canada) Tom Burgess	(Japan) Toyota Corolla	2:33:23
9	(British Columbia) Mountain Trials Rally	(New Zealand) Clive Smith	(Canada) Walter Leemans	(Japan) Datsun 510	1:41:05
10	(Manitoba) Trail of the Bison Rally	(Canada) Randy Black	(Canada) Tom Burgess	(Japan) Datsun 510 SSS	0:36:53
11	(Ontario) Muskoka Rally	(Finland) Taisto Heinonen	(Canada) Tom Burgess	(Japan) Toyota Corolla	1:50:41
12	(Ontario) Rally of the Tall Pines	(Finland) Taisto Heinonen	(Canada) Tom Burgess	(Japan) Toyota Corolla	2:00:29

=== 1980 ===
Round	Event	Winning driver	Winning co-driver	Winning car	Winning time
1	(Quebec) Rallye Perce-Neige	(Finland) Taisto Heinonen	(Canada) Tom Burgess	(Japan) Toyota Celica	3:46:57
2	Canadian Ontario Winter Rally	(Finland) Taisto Heinonen	(Canada) Tom Burgess	(Japan) Toyota Celica	2:04:00
3	(British Columbia) Pacific Forest Rally	(Finland) Taisto Heinonen	(Canada) Tom Burgess	(Japan) Toyota Celica	1:33:59
4	(Quebec) Rallye Pistons les Wapitis	(United States) John Buffum	(United States) Doug E. Shepherd	(United Kingdom) Triumph TR8	3:48:20
5	(Quebec) Rallye Baie-des-Chaleurs	(United States) John Buffum	(United States) Doug E. Shepherd	(United Kingdom) Triumph TR8	1:12:06
6	Nova Scotia Highlands Rally	(United States) John Buffum	(United Kingdom) Fred Gallagher	(United Kingdom) Triumph TR8	2:19:05
7	(New Brunswick) Lobster Rally	(United States) John Buffum	(United Kingdom) Fred Gallagher	(United Kingdom) Triumph TR8	1:26:12
8	(British Columbia) Mountain Trials Rally	(New Zealand) Rod Millen	(New Zealand) Grant Whittaker	(Japan) Datsun 510	2:41:24
9	(Alberta) Rocky Mountain Rally	(Finland) Taisto Heinonen	(Canada) Tom Burgess	(Japan) Toyota Corolla	2:28:18
10	(Manitoba) Trail of the Bison Rally	(Finland) Taisto Heinonen	(Canada) Tom Burgess	(Japan) Toyota Corolla	1:12:50
11	(Ontario) Muskoka Rally	(New Zealand) Rod Millen	(New Zealand) Grant Whittaker	(Japan) Datsun 510	1:23:04
12	(Ontario) Rally of the Tall Pines	(New Zealand) Rod Millen	(New Zealand) Mike Franchi	(Japan) Datsun 510	2:7:13

=== 1979 ===
Round	Event	Winning driver	Winning co-driver	Winning car	Winning time
1	(Quebec) Rallye Perce-Neige	(Finland) Taisto Heinonen	(Canada) Tom Burgess	(Japan) Toyota Celica	2:46:41
2	Ontario Winter Rally	(Canada) Jean-Paul Pérusse	(Canada) Louis Bélanger	(United Kingdom) Triumph TR7	1:31:23
3	(British Columbia) Pacific Forest Rally	(Finland) Taisto Heinonen	(Canada) Tom Burgess	(Japan) Toyota Celica	1:40:25
4	(Manitoba) Trail of the Bison Rally	(Finland) Taisto Heinonen	(Canada) Tom Burgess	(Japan) Toyota Celica	1:20:58
5	(Quebec) Rallye Pistons les Wapitis	(United States) John Buffum	(United States) Doug E. Shepherd	(United Kingdom) Triumph TR8	1:27:54
6	(Quebec) Rallye Baie-des-Chaleurs	(Finland) Taisto Heinonen	(Canada) Tom Burgess	(Japan) Toyota Celica	1:16:00
7	Nova Scotia Highlands Rally	(United States) John Buffum	(United States) Doug E. Shepherd	(United Kingdom) Triumph TR8	1:48:08
8	(New Brunswick) Lobster Rally	(New Zealand) Rod Millen	(Canada) John Bellefleur	(Japan) Datsun 510	1:13:03
9	(British Columbia) Mountain Trials Rally	(Finland) Taisto Heinonen	(Canada) Tom Burgess	(Japan) Toyota Celica	3:03:23
10	(Alberta) Rocky Mountain Rally	(New Zealand) Rod Millen	(Canada) John Bellefleur	(Japan) Datsun 510	3:03:23
11	(Ontario) Rally of the Tall Pines	(Finland) Taisto Heinonen	(Canada) Tom Burgess	(Japan) Toyota Celica	2:03:06

=== 1978 ===
Round	Event	Winning driver	Winning co-driver	Winning car	Winning time
1	(Quebec) Rallye Pistons les Wapitis	(Sweden) Stig Blomqvist	(United States) Victoria Dykema-Gauntlett Vicky	(Sweden) Saab 99	
2	(Quebec) Rallye Baie-des-Chaleurs	(United States) John Buffum	(United States) Doug E. Shepherd	(United Kingdom) Triumph TR7	
3	(Nova Scotia) Highlands Rally	?	?	?	
4	(New Brunswick) Lobster Rally	(United States) John Buffum	(United States) Victoria Dykema-Gauntlett Vicky	(United Kingdom) Triumph TR7	
5	(Alberta) Rocky Mountain Rally	(Finland) Taisto Heinonen	(Canada) Tom Burgess	(Japan) Toyota Celica	

=== 1977 ===
Round	Event	Winning driver	Winning co-driver	Winning car	Winning time
1	Ontario Winter Rally	(United States) John Buffum	(United States) Victoria Dykema-Gauntlett Vicky	(United Kingdom) Triumph TR7	
2	(British Columbia) Pacific Forest Rally	(Finland) Taisto Heinonen	(Canada) Tom Burgess	(Japan) Toyota Celica	1:56:38
3	(Quebec) Rallye Pistons les Wapitis	(United States) John Buffum	(United States) Victoria Dykema-Gauntlett Vicky	(United Kingdom) Triumph TR7	
4	(Nova Scotia) Highlands Rally	(United States) John Buffum	(United States) Victoria Dykema-Gauntlett Vicky	(United Kingdom) Triumph TR7	
5	(New Brunswick) Lobster Rally	(United States) John Buffum	(United States) Victoria Dykema-Gauntlett Vicky	(United Kingdom) Triumph TR7	
6	(British Columbia) Mountain Trials Rally	(United States) John Buffum	(United States) Victoria Dykema-Gauntlett Vicky	(United Kingdom) Triumph TR7	
7	(Alberta) Rocky Mountain Rally	(United States) John Buffum	(United States) Victoria Dykema-Gauntlett Vicky	(United Kingdom) Triumph TR7	

=== 1976 ===
Round	Event	Winning driver	Winning co-driver	Winning car	Winning time
1	(Quebec) Rallye des Neige	(Canada) Jean-Paul Pérusse	(Canada) John Bellefleur	(Italy) Fiat 128	1:08:21
2	(Ontario) Canadian Winter Rally	(Canada) Jean-Paul Pérusse	(Canada) John Bellefleur	(Italy) Fiat 128	7:19:14
3	(Quebec) Rallye Pistons les Wapitis	(United States) John Buffum	(United States) Victoria Dykema-Gauntlett Vicky	(United States) Ford Escort RS 1600	
4	(Nova Scotia) Highlands Rally	(Canada) Jean-Paul Pérusse	(Canada) John Bellefleur	(Italy) Fiat 128	
5	(New Brunswick) Lobster Rally	(United States) John Buffum	(United States) Victoria Dykema-Gauntlett Vicky	(United States) Ford Escort RS 1600	
6	(Alberta) Rocky Mountain Rally	(Finland) Taisto Heinonen	(Canada) Tom Burgess	(Japan) Toyota Celica	
7	(Quebec) Critérium du Québec	(Finland) Taisto Heinonen	(Canada) Tom Burgess	(France) Renault 17 Gordini	
8	(Ontario) Rally of the Rideau Lakes	?	?	?	

=== 1975 ===
Round	Event	Winning driver	Winning co-driver	Winning car	Winning time
1	(Quebec) Rallye des Neige	?	?	?	
2	(Ontario) Canadian Winter Rally	(United States) John Buffum	(United States) Victoria Dykema-Gauntlett Vicky	(Germany) Porsche 911 S	4:42:44
3	(Alberta) Rocky Mountain Rally	(Finland) Taisto Heinonen	(Canada) Tom Burgess	(Sweden) Volvo 142	
4	(Quebec) Critérium du Québec	(United States) John Buffum	(United States) Victoria Dykema-Gauntlett Vicky	(Germany) Porsche 911 S	7:13:44
5	(Ontario) Rally of the Tall Pines	(United States) John Buffum	(United States) Victoria Dykema-Gauntlett Vicky	(Germany) Porsche 911 S	

=== 1974 ===
Round	Event	Winning driver	Winning co-driver	Winning car	Winning time
1	(Quebec) Rallye des Neige	(Canada) Walter Boyce	(Canada) Doug Woods	(Japan) Toyota Corolla	
2	(Ontario) Canadian Winter Rally	(Canada) Jean-Paul Pérusse	(Canada) John Bellefleur	(Italy) Fiat 128	0:58:19
3	(Quebec) Rallye Pistons les Wapitis	(Canada) Walter Boyce	(Canada) Doug Woods	(Japan) Toyota Corolla	
4	(British Columbia) Mountain Trials Rally	(Finland) Taisto Heinonen	(Canada) John Bellefleur	(Japan) Toyota Corolla	
5	(Alberta) Rocky Mountain Rally	(Finland) Taisto Heinonen	(Canada) John Bellefleur	(Japan) Toyota Corolla	
6	(Quebec) Critérium du Québec	(Canada) Jean-Paul Pérusse	(Canada) John Bellefleur	(Italy) Fiat 124 Abarth	

=== 1973 ===
Round	Event	Winning driver	Winning co-driver	Winning car	Winning time
1	(Ontario) Canadian Winter Rally	(Canada) Jean-Paul Pérusse	(Canada) Lee Bartholomew	(Italy) Fiat 128	
2	(Ontario) Rally of the Rideau Lakes	(Canada) Walter Boyce	(United Kingdom) Stuart Gray	(Japan) Toyota Corolla	0:28:06
5	(Alberta) Rocky Mountain Rally	(Canada) Walter Boyce	(Canada) Doug Woods	(Japan) Toyota Corolla	
6	(Quebec) Critérium du Québec	(Canada) Walter Boyce	?	(Japan) Toyota Corolla	

- Before 1973 the information about Rally in Canada is very rare to find, any help will be greatly appreciated.
