= Rally of the Tall Pines =

Canadian car rally

- Nickname: Tall Pines Rally
- Purpose: Rally, penultimate round of the Canadian Rally Championship
- Date: late November
- Frequency: annually
- Location: Bancroft, Ontario
- Inaugurated: 1971
- Website: tallpinesrally.com

Rally of the Tall Pines is an annual car rally in Bancroft, Ontario, Canada.

The rally has been occurring annually since 1971 and is the seventh of eight rounds of the Canadian Rally Championship.

== Rally ==
The one-day rally takes place in Bancroft and has been occurring annually since 1971, in late November.

It is the seventh of eight rounds of the Canadian Rally Championship. Navigator Andrew Proudfood described the rally as the most challenging of the eight rounds.

The rally is also part of the North American Rally Cup, the Eastern Canadian Rally Championship, and the Ontario Performance Rally Championship.

The 7.3km rally course is split into 17 stages. The teams are allowed three service intervals during the rally. Around 50 vehicles take part.

The rally attracts competitors from across North America. The rally is coordinated by Bruce Leonard. Previous coordinators include Ross Wood.

=== Canadian Rally Championship stage headquarters ===
A map showing the locations of the rallies in the 2025 championship. Bancroft headquarters is marked with a red dot. Other event headquarters are marked with black dots.

== History ==
The first Rally of the Tall Pines occurred in Bramalea in 1971. The second rally occurred in 1972 and was hosted there until 1976. Peterborough hosted the rally from 1977 to 1980. Bancroft first hosted the rally in 1981 and then 1982. It reverted to Peterborough from 1983 until 1996 and has been hosted in Bancroft continuously since 1997. The 2020 rally was cancelled during the COVID pandemic.

Rally of the Tall Pines winners
Rally	Year	Location	Winners
1	1971	Bramalea	Medwell / Manson
2	1972	Orillia	Vanier / Vanier
3	1973	Orillia	Vanier / Vanier
4	1974	Orillia	Perusse / Bellefl.
5	1975	Orillia	Buffum / Vicki
6	1976	Orillia	Heinonen / Burgess
7	1977	Peterborough	Heinonen / Burgess
8	1978	Peterborough	Perusse / Bellefl.
9	1979	Peterborough	Heinonen / Burgess
10	1980	Peterborough	Millen / Franchi
11	1981	Bancroft	Heinonen / Burgess
12	1982	Bancroft	Black / Burgess
13	1983	Peterborough	Anderson / Jackson
14	1984	Peterborough	Bendle / Amershi
15	1985	Peterborough	Bendle / Amershi
16	1986	Peterborough	Luttenberger / MacD.
17	1987	Peterborough	Buffum / Grimshaw
18	1988	Peterborough	O'Neil / Headland
19	1989	Peterborough	O'Neil / Headland
20	1990	Peterborough	O'Neil / Headland
21	1991	Peterborough	Jolles / Maxwell
22	1992	Peterborough	Sprongl / Sprongl
23	1993	Peterborough	Choiniere / Becker
24	1994	Peterborough	Sprongl / Sprongl
25	1995	Peterborough	Sprongl / Latreille
26	1996	Peterborough	Sprongl / Bellefleur
27	1997	Bancroft	Sprongl / Sprongl
28	1998	Bancroft	Sprongl / Sprongl
29	1999	Bancroft	Sprongl / Sprongl
30	2000	Bancroft	McGeer / Williams
31	2001	Bancroft	McGeer / Williams
32	2002	Bancroft	McGeer / Williams
33	2003	Bancroft	Sprongl / Maxwell
34	2004	Bancroft	L'Estage / Napert
35	2005	Bancroft	Buffum / Richard
36	2006	Bancroft	L'Estage / Richard
37	2007	Bancroft	L'Estage / Richard
38	2008	Bancroft	Richard / Ockwell
39	2009	Bancroft	Richard / Ockwell
40	2010	Bancroft	L'Estage / Richard
41	2011	Bancroft	Urlichich / Brady
42	2012	Bancroft	Richard / Ockwell
43	2013	Bancroft	Martin / Johnson
44	2014	Bancroft	L'Estage / Ockwell
45	2015	Bancroft	Vincent / Vincent
46	2016	Bancroft	L'Estage / Garrod
47	2017	Bancroft	L'Estage / Ockwell
48	2018	Bancroft	Carre / Joyal
49	2019	Bancroft	Urlichich / Nicolaeva
—	2020	Bancroft	Cancelled due to COVID-19 restrictions
50	2021	Bancroft	Leblanc / Leblanc
51	2022	Bancroft	Mailloux / Poirier
52	2023	Bancroft	Mailloux / Poirier
53	2024	Bancroft	Besner / Joyal
54	2025	Bancroft	Cordero / Hernandez
