= Audi S2 =

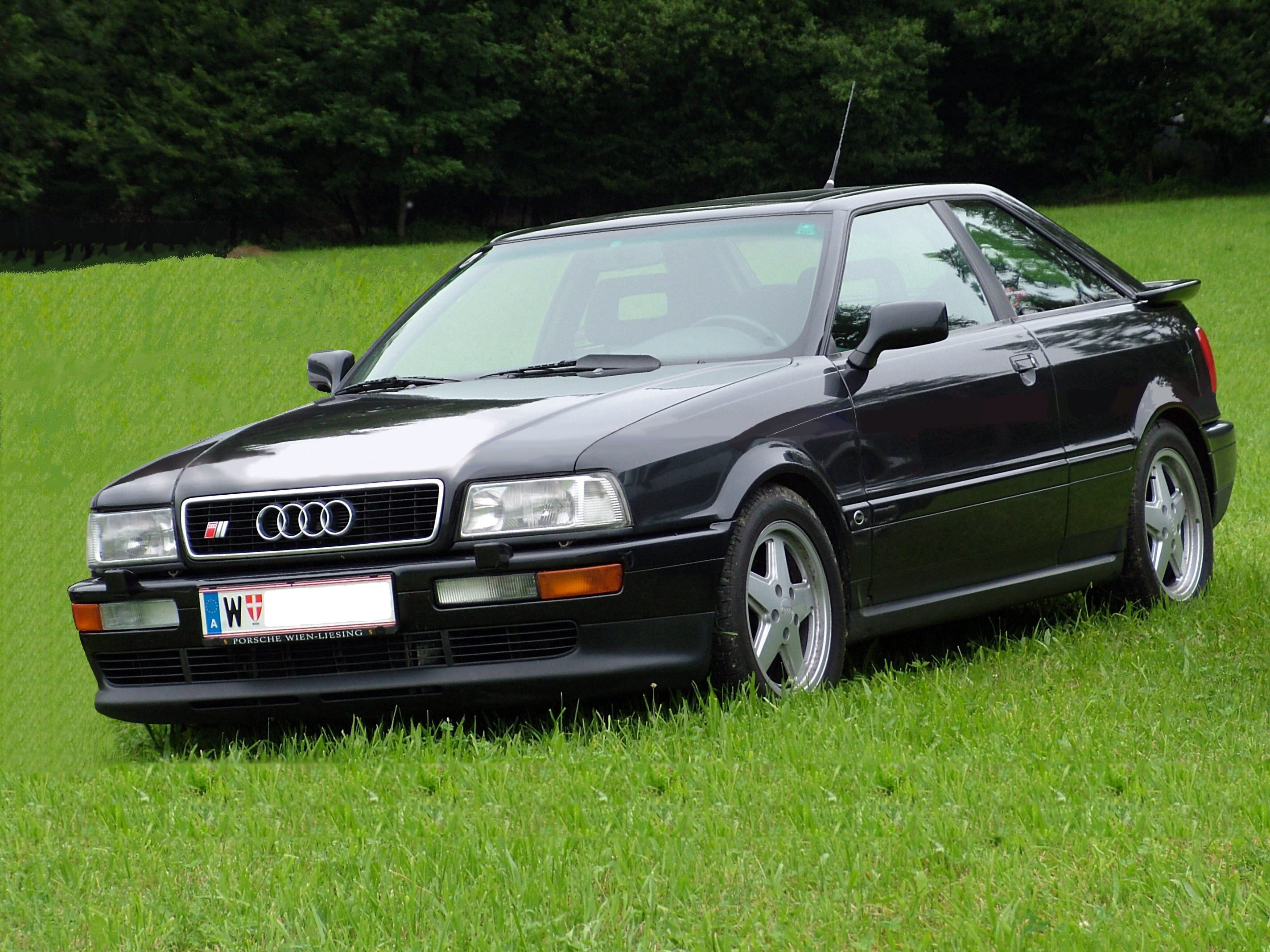

Overview
- Manufacturer: Audi AG
- Production: September 1990 – December 1995
- Assembly: Germany: Neckarsulm

Body and chassis
- Class: Sports car (S)
- Body style: 3-door liftback coupé; 4-door sedan; 5-door estate
- Layout: Longitudinal front-engine, all-wheel-drive
- Platform: Audi 80
- Related: Audi Coupé

Powertrain
- Engine: 2.2 L (2226 cc) turbocharged 20V I5
- Transmission: 5-speed manual (1990–1992); 6-speed manual (1993–1995)

Dimensions
- Kerb weight: 1,525 kg (3,362 lb)

Chronology
- Predecessor: Audi Quattro

The Audi S2 is an Audi sports car, manufactured by the division of quattro GmbH (now Audi Sport GmbH) on the same platform as the Audi 80 (B4) in Neckarsulm, Germany, produced from 1991 to 1995. The Audi S2 is the first car in the Audi S series. In 1994, a more powerful Audi RS 2 Avant was released.

== History ==
Together with Konrad Schmidt Motorsport GmbH (SMS), who had been responsible for Audi's DTM version of the V8 quattro, Audi developed a sports version of the Coupé in September 1990 called the Audi S2. This was meant to boost lagging sales of the Coupé and as partial replacement for the famous Audi Quattro (launched in 1980). The front was revised to match the Audi V8, with new headlights and a grille with a body-coloured surround, a look which was then introduced on the entire Audi range before long. The S2 featured the well-proven 2.2-litre in-line five-cylinder 20-valve turbo petrol engine from the Audi 200 20V, which was a variant of the engine used in the Audi Quattro. A similar version of the engine was used in the Audi 100 based S4 (the 'Ur-S4'). The S2 came as standard with quattro permanent four-wheel drive, and featured a heavy-duty 5-speed manual transmission, and was capable of 150 mph.

The S2 was initially available with a 2.2-litre turbocharged engine which produced 220 PS (162 kW; 217 bhp) (Engine code 3B), coupled to a 5-speed transmission. In October 1992, the engine received minor upgrades as per the Audi S4, including distributor-less ignition, which increased power output to 230 PS (169 kW; 227 bhp) (Engine code: ABY) which was coupled to a new 6-speed gearbox. Although the power increase was minimal, the engine now produced 350 N⋅m (258 lb⋅ft) of torque (up from 309 N⋅m (228 lb⋅ft)) and featured an overboost function that allowed up to 380 N⋅m (280 lb⋅ft) in short bursts. The 3B-engined car will accelerate from 0-100 km/h (62.1 mph) in 5.7 seconds, continuing to a top speed of 246 km/h (152.9 mph). The ABY-engined S2 Coupé will accelerate from 0-100 km/h (62.1 mph) in 5.9 seconds, continuing to a top speed of 246 km/h (152.9 mph).

In 1993, the S2 received some cosmetic updates, including new AVUS-style alloy wheels, ellipsoid beam (projector) headlamps and clear front indicator lenses. In February, the S2 Avant was introduced (with the more powerful engine and six-speed transmission from the outset). A limited run of four-door S2 sedan models were sold from July 1993 until 1994. The S2 saloon and Avant feature a lot of similarities in the rear axle support system to the later B5 A4 quattro. The B4 platform S2 Avant was also used between 1993 and 1995 as the basis for Audi's RS2 Avant super-sports estate, which was modified for Audi with assistance from Porsche. A total of 7,370 S2 Coupés were built, along with 1,812 S2 Avants and only 306 S2 sedans. In total, 9,488 S2s of all types were produced.

== Technical specifications ==
Engine	2.2 L (2,226 cc) turbocharged 20V I5
Engine power	162–169 kW (220–230 PS; 217–227 bhp)
Transmission	5-speed manual (6-speed since 1993)
Acceleration 0–100 km/h (0–62 mph)	6.1 seconds (Coupé, 1991) 5.9 seconds (Coupé, 1995) 6.0 seconds (Sedan) 6.1 seconds (Avant)
Top speed	241–250 km/h (150–155 mph)
Weight	1,525 kg (3,362 lb)

== Gallery ==
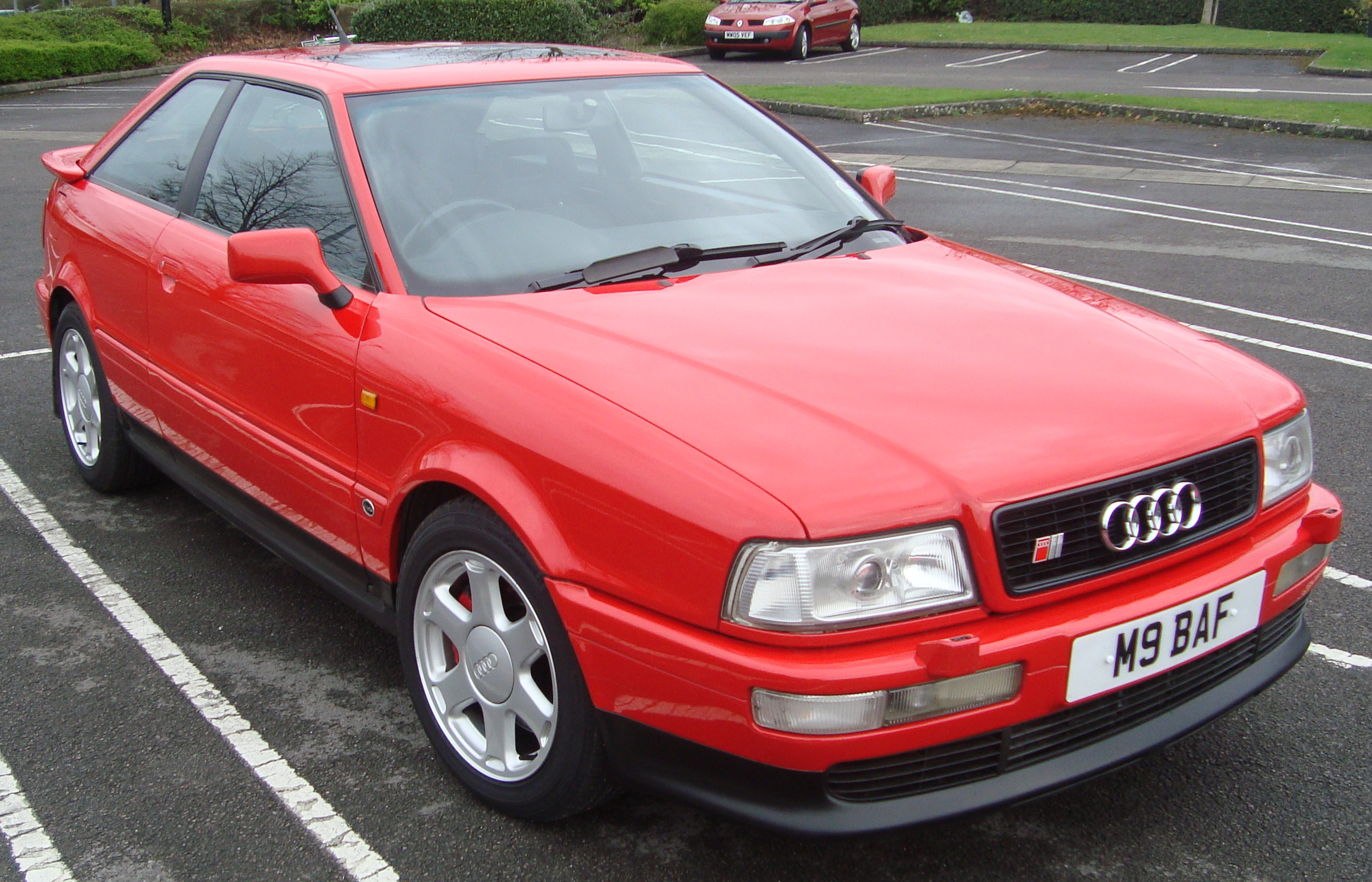
S2 Coupé

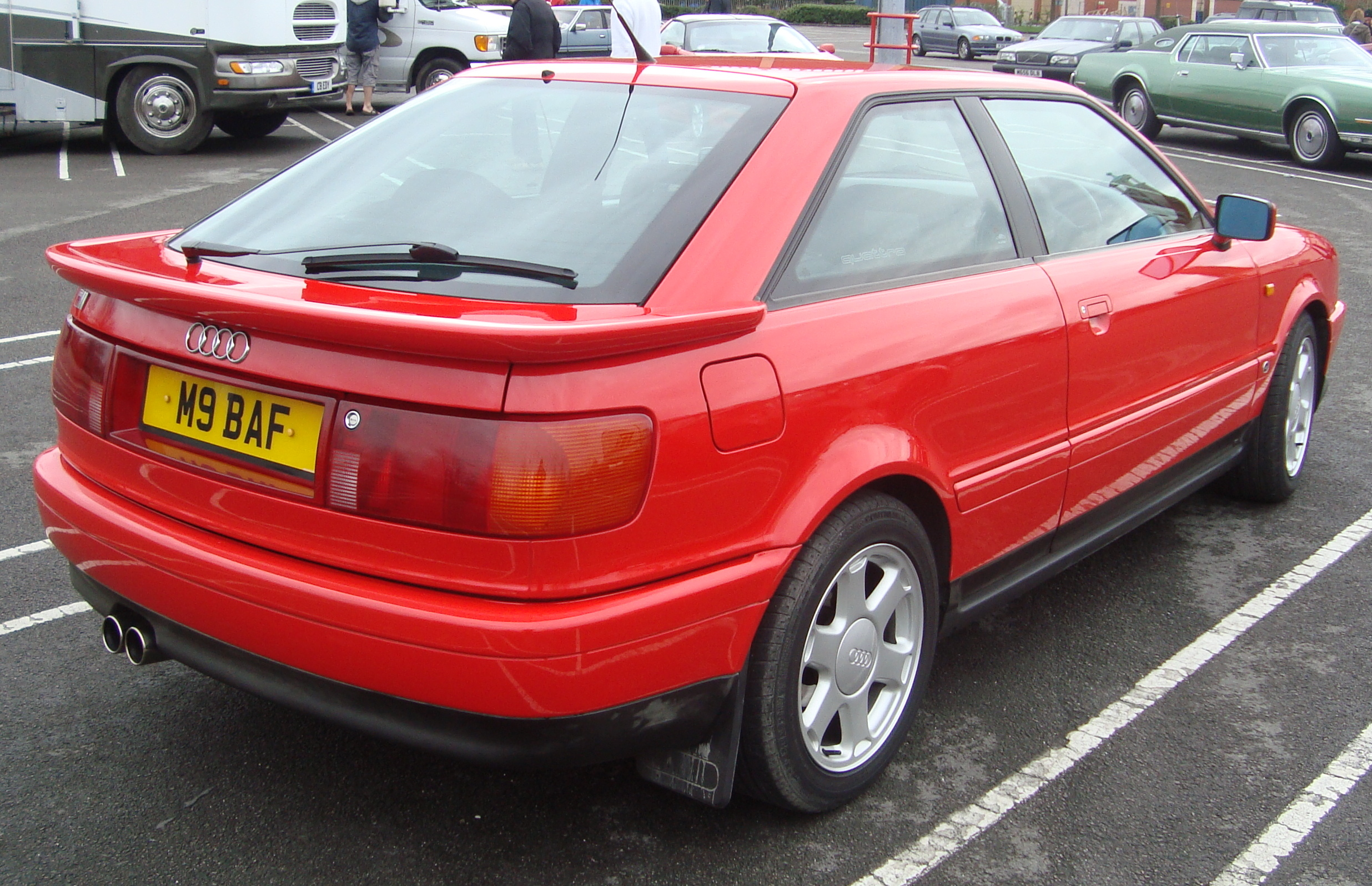
S2 Coupé, rear view

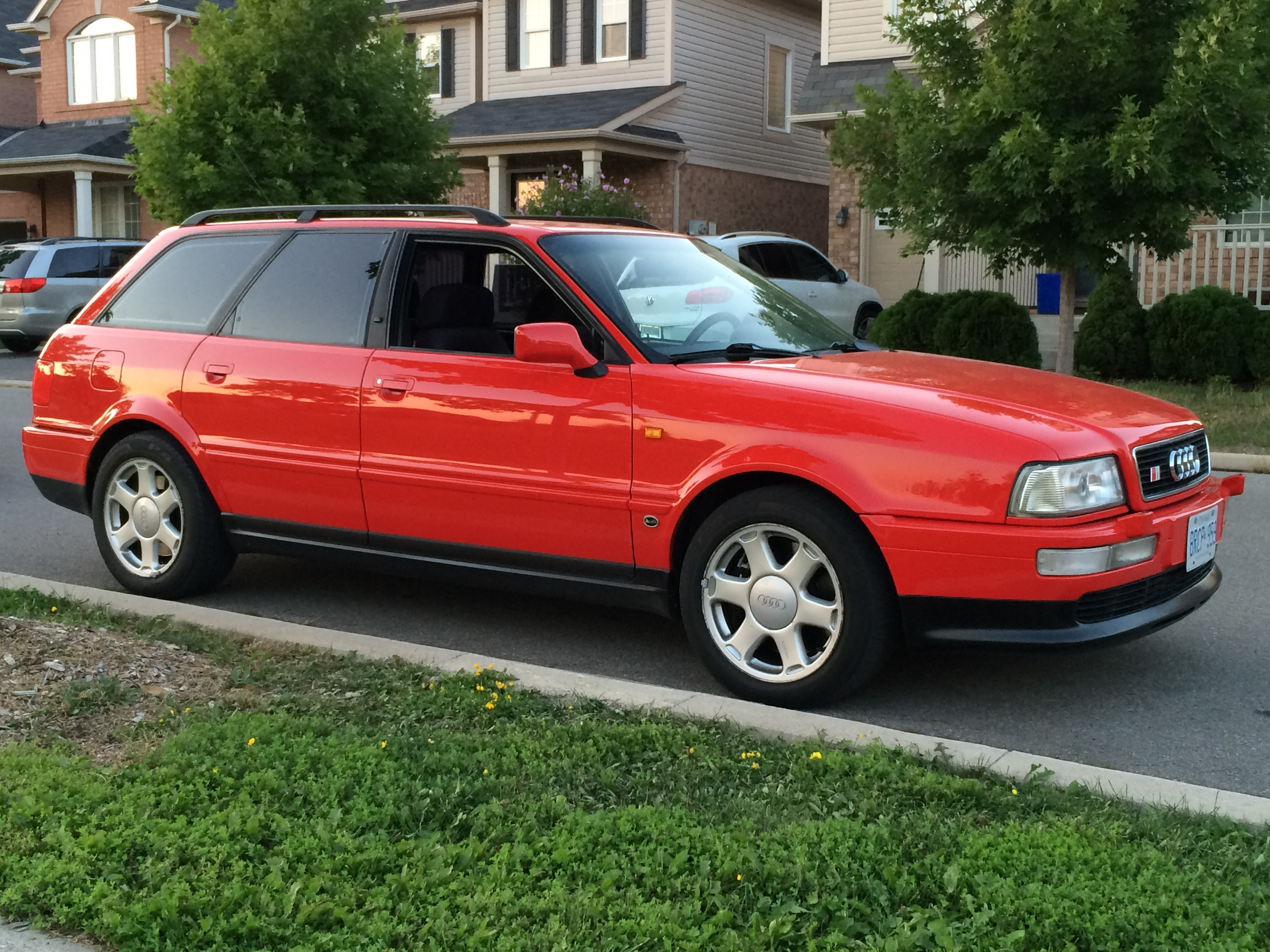
S2 Avant
