= Subaru WRX STI =

Compact sports car

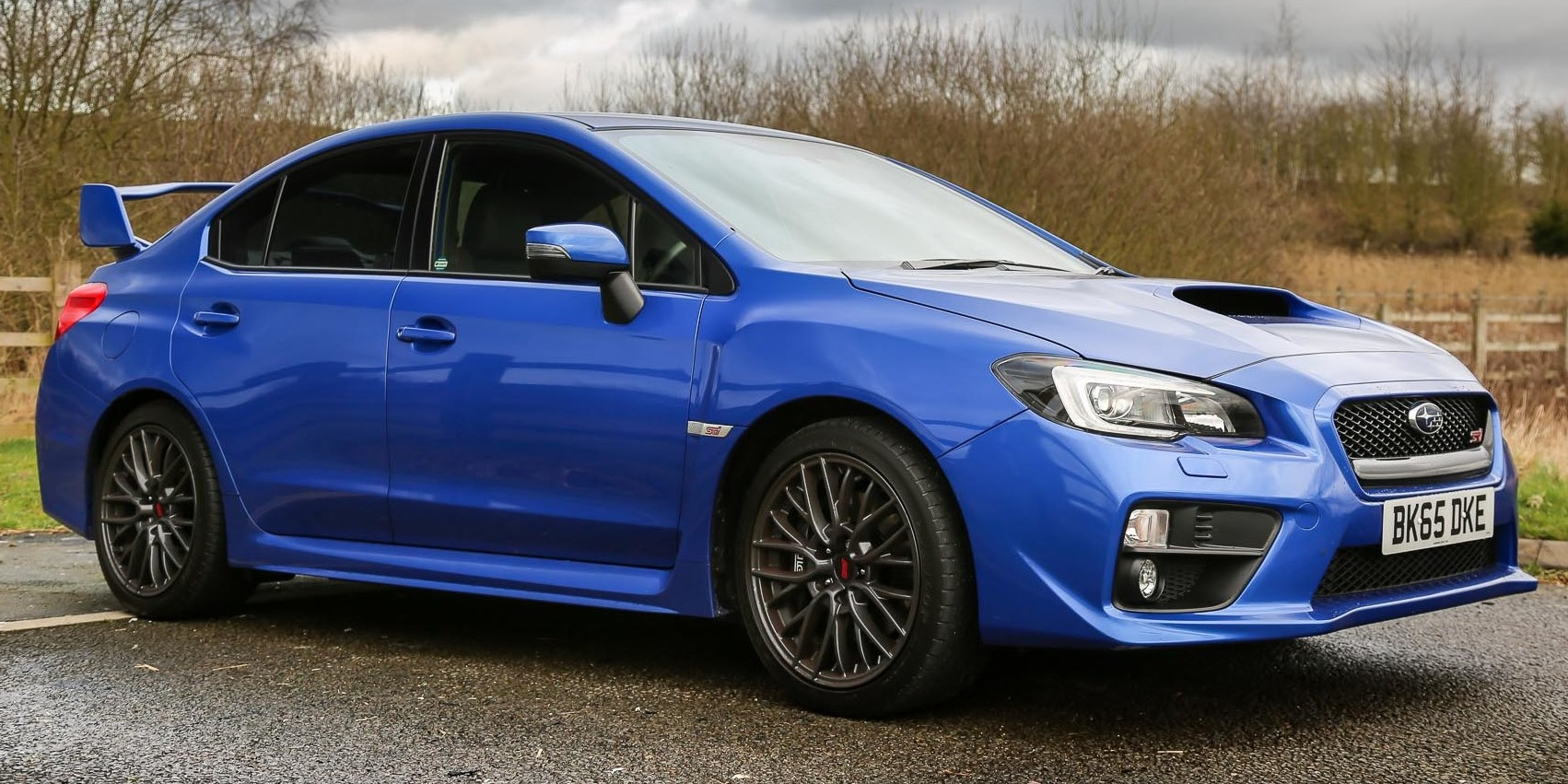
- A Subaru WRX STI

Overview
- Manufacturer: Subaru (Subaru Tecnica International)
- Also called: Subaru Impreza WRX STI (1992–2014)
- Production: 1992–2014 (Impreza-based models); 2015–2021 (WRX-based models); 2026– (WRX STI Sport R)
- Assembly: Japan: Ōta, Gunma (Main Plant)

Body and chassis
- Class: Sport compact car
- Body style: 4-door sedan
- Layout: Front-engine, four-wheel-drive
- Platform: Subaru SI Platform
- Related: Subaru WRX

Powertrain
- Engine: Petrol: 2.0 L EJ207 H4-T (JDM); 2.5 L EJ257 H4-T (export); 2.4 L FA24F turbo H4 (WRX STI Sport R)
- Transmission: 6-speed TY85 manual

The Subaru WRX STI is a variant of the Subaru WRX sedan produced by in-house tuning company Subaru Tecnica International between 2014 and 2021. It succeeded the Subaru Impreza WRX STI. Production of the WRX STI concluded after its first generation, there are currently no plans for a VB WRX STI.

== First generation (VA; 2014–2021) ==
The VA WRX STI was released in 2014 alongside the VA WRX. It featured uprated brakes, the Subaru Technica International tuned EJ257 4-cylinder engine, an uprated 6-speed manual transmission, along with a unique body kit and spoiler. Interior upgrades include an STI-exclusive gauge cluster, shifter knob, and other unique touches, including Recaro bucket seats in certain models. The WRX STI for the most part featured a red accented interior, over the WRX's black and grey.

Starting with the MY2018 update, the WRX STI obtained several changes, such as a restyled front fascia, steering responsive headlights (SRH), revised suspension tuning, a fully electronic driver-controlled central differential (DCCD), 19-inch wheels, and upgraded Brembo brakes.

In 2020, Subaru announced they would be phasing out the WRX STI along with the EJ257, the last variant of the EJ engine, with the release of the VB series WRX in 2021. Subaru introduced the STI WRX EJ25 Final Edition, based on Subaru's flagship STI Spec R. The EJ25 Final Edition features a range of upgrades including BBS 19-inch gold forged aluminium wheels, silver Brembo calipers, black door mirror covers, front grille pinstripe in STI cherry blossom, Final Edition engine cover plate, and numbered EJ25 Final Edition badge. Only 75 were produced for markets across the globe.

== Second generation (VB; 2021–) ==
Although there is no official VB WRX STI available, Subaru has showcased an STI S210 prototype, though limited to Japan only. For markets outside of Japan, Subaru has introduced several trim levels of WRX with 'tuning by STI'. STI also offers many accessories for the second generation WRX such as lip spoilers, exhaust tips, shifter knobs, and many other options depending on region.

On June 1st, 2025, Subaru's CTO (Chief Technology Officer) Tetsuro Fujinuki announced that the company will unveil a new car at the Japan Mobility Show that will be held in October 2025. A drawing of a car was quickly shown to the audience and the styling of the featured drawing generated speculation that it could be of the new generation WRX STI. However, at the Japan Mobility Show itself, Subaru unveiled two new concepts of a second-generation STI, one electrically-powered and the other based on the VB-platform WRX. No production plans were announced.

== Engines ==
The only engines that have been in the standalone WRX STI that began in MY2015 are the EJ257 (Export) and EJ207 (JDM only) specifications of the Subaru EJ engine.

The MY2015 to MY2018 EJ257 in the WRX STI excluding the 2018 Type RA, produces 305 hp (227 kW; 309 PS) at 6000 rpm and 290 lb⋅ft (393 N⋅m) of torque at 4000 rpm. MY2019 saw the power increase to 310 hp (231 kW; 314 PS) with torque figures unchanged, and they remained there for the remaining years up to MY2021 excluding the 2019 S209. The 2018 Type RA produces 310 hp (231 kW; 314 PS) at 6000 rpm and 290 lb⋅ft (393 N⋅m) of torque at 4000 rpm and the 2019 S209 produces 341 hp (254 kW; 346 PS) at 6400 rpm and 330 lb⋅ft (447 N⋅m) at 3600 rpm.

The EJ207 in the WRX STI produces 308 PS (227 kW; 304 hp) at 6400 rpm and 422 N⋅m (311 lb⋅ft) of torque at 4400 rpm except in the S207 and the S208 models. The S207 produces 328 PS (241 kW; 324 hp) at 7200 rpm and 431 N⋅m (318 lb⋅ft) at 3200-4800 rpm while the S208 produced 329 PS (242 kW; 324 hp) at 7200 rpm and 432 N⋅m (319 lb⋅ft) at 3200–4800 rpm.

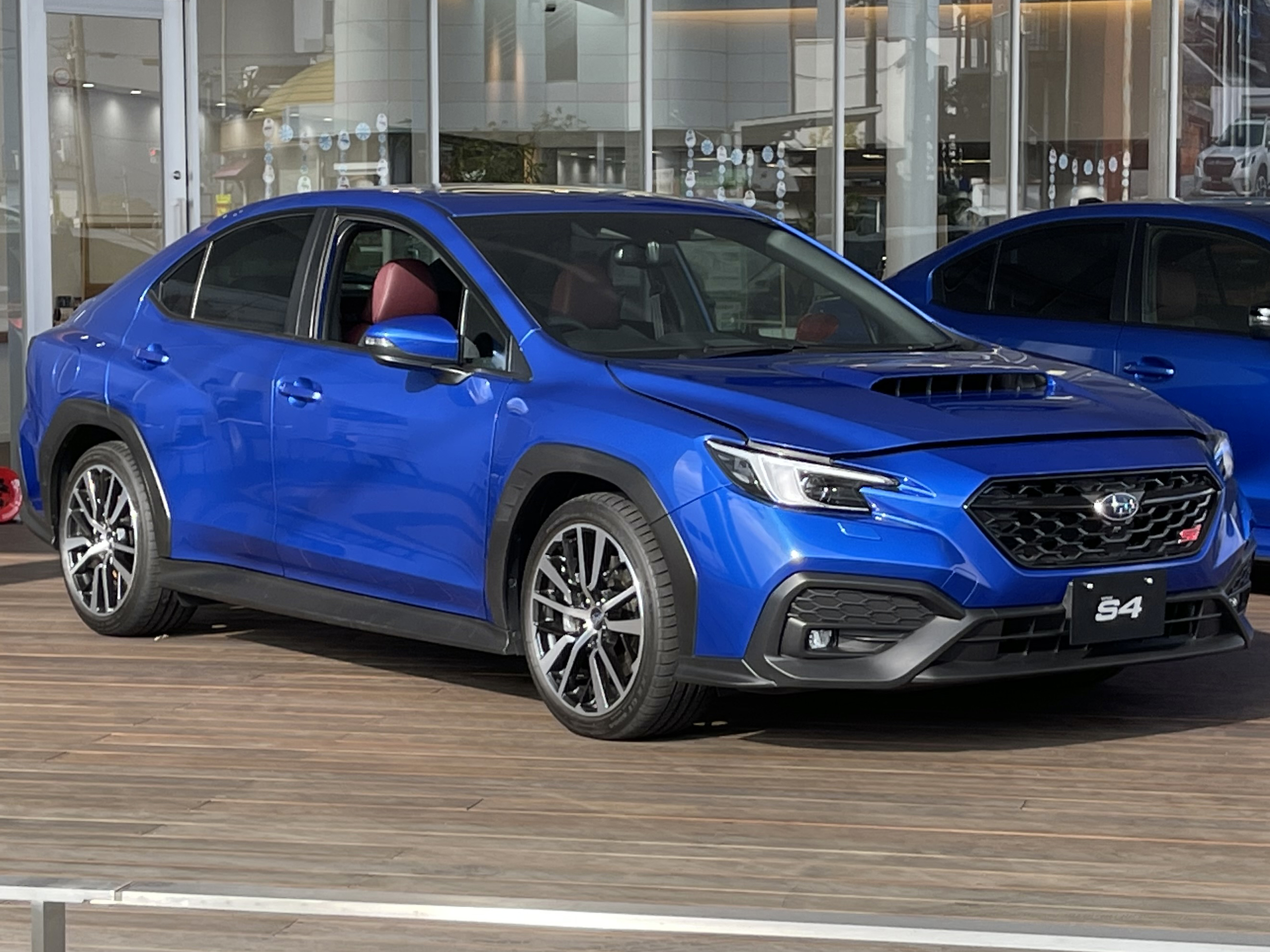
Subaru WRX S4 STI Sport R EX.

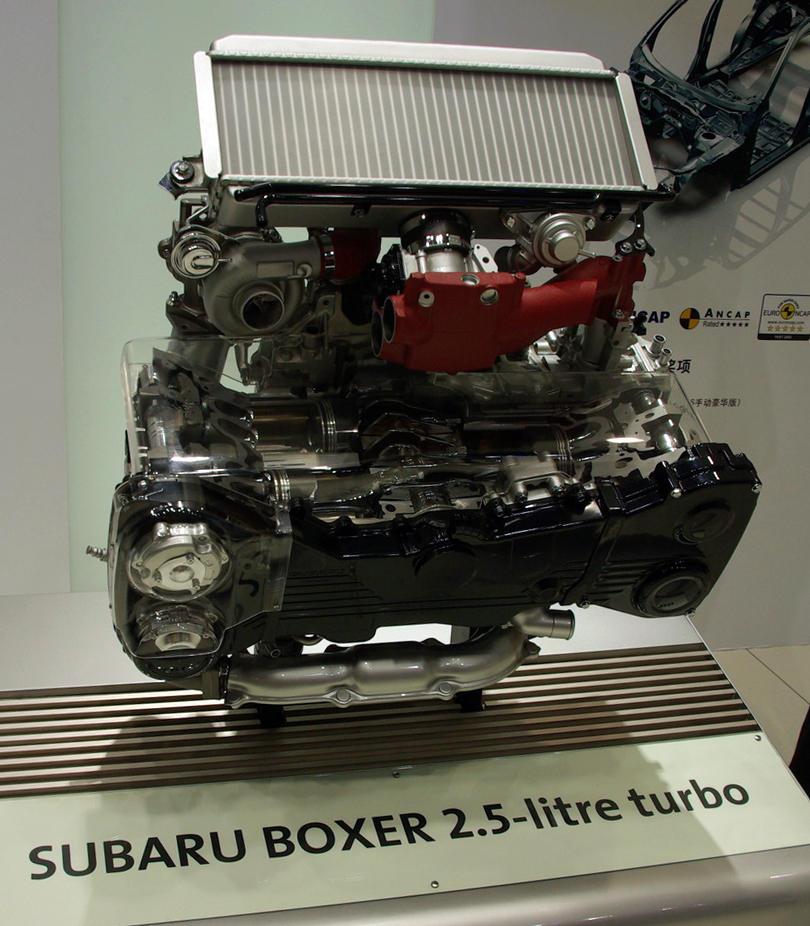
The tuned-by-STI EJ257 Boxer-Turbo engine.

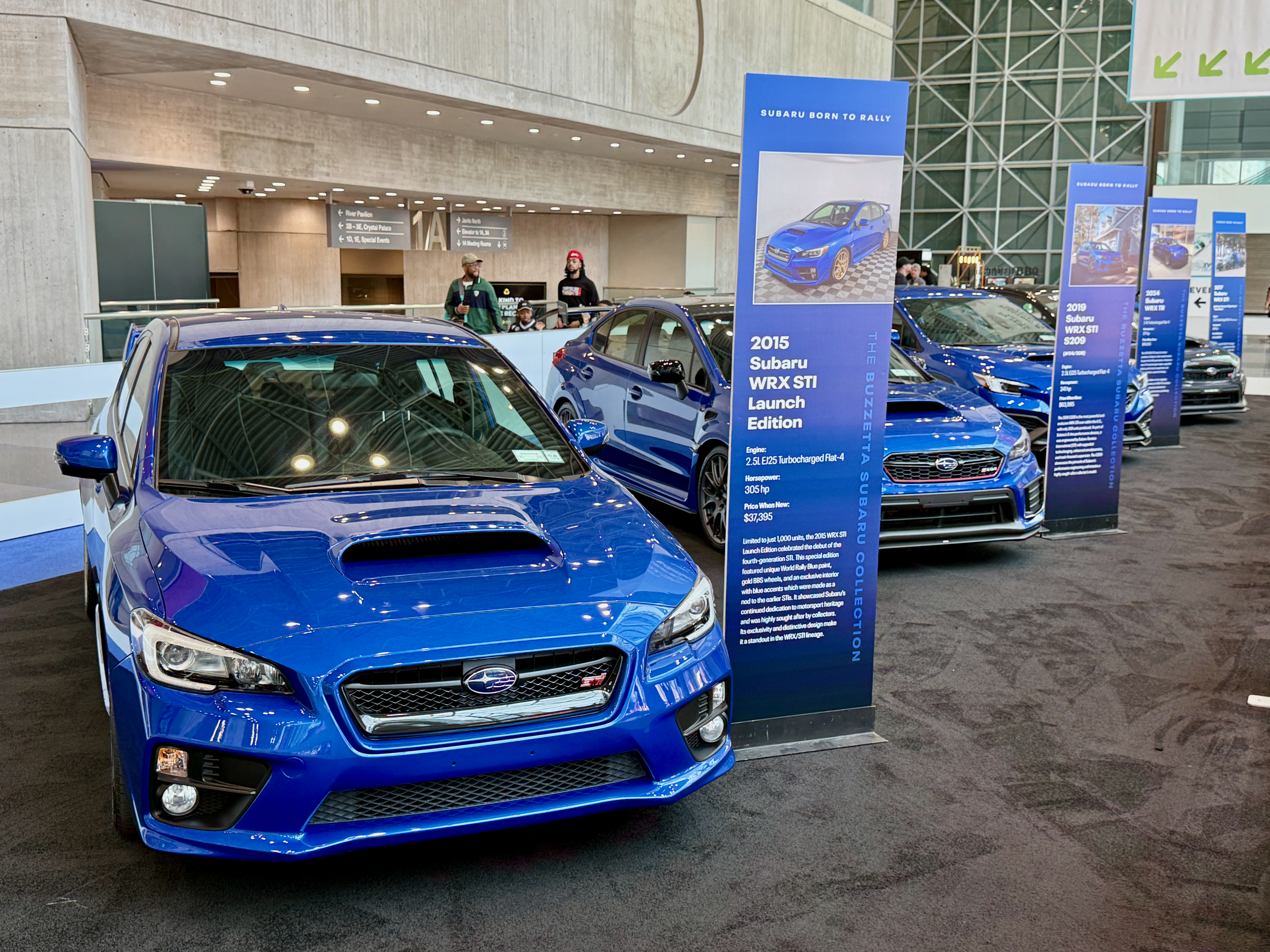
Three Subaru WRX STIs
