= John Bird (racing driver) =

Canadian former rally racer

John Bird is a Canadian former rally racer. Teamed up with Bruce Simpson, they entered a combined total of 140 rallies, winning 102 of them. Bird was inducted into the Canadian Motorsport Hall of Fame in 2006.
