= South African National Rally Championship =

The South African National Rally Championship is a series of rallying events that has taken place each year since 1960. It was won eleven times by Sarel van der Merwe in the 1970s and 1980s and ten times by Serge Damseaux from 1989 to 2004. Toyota and Volkswagen vehicles have won the title of champion car in most years since 1998.

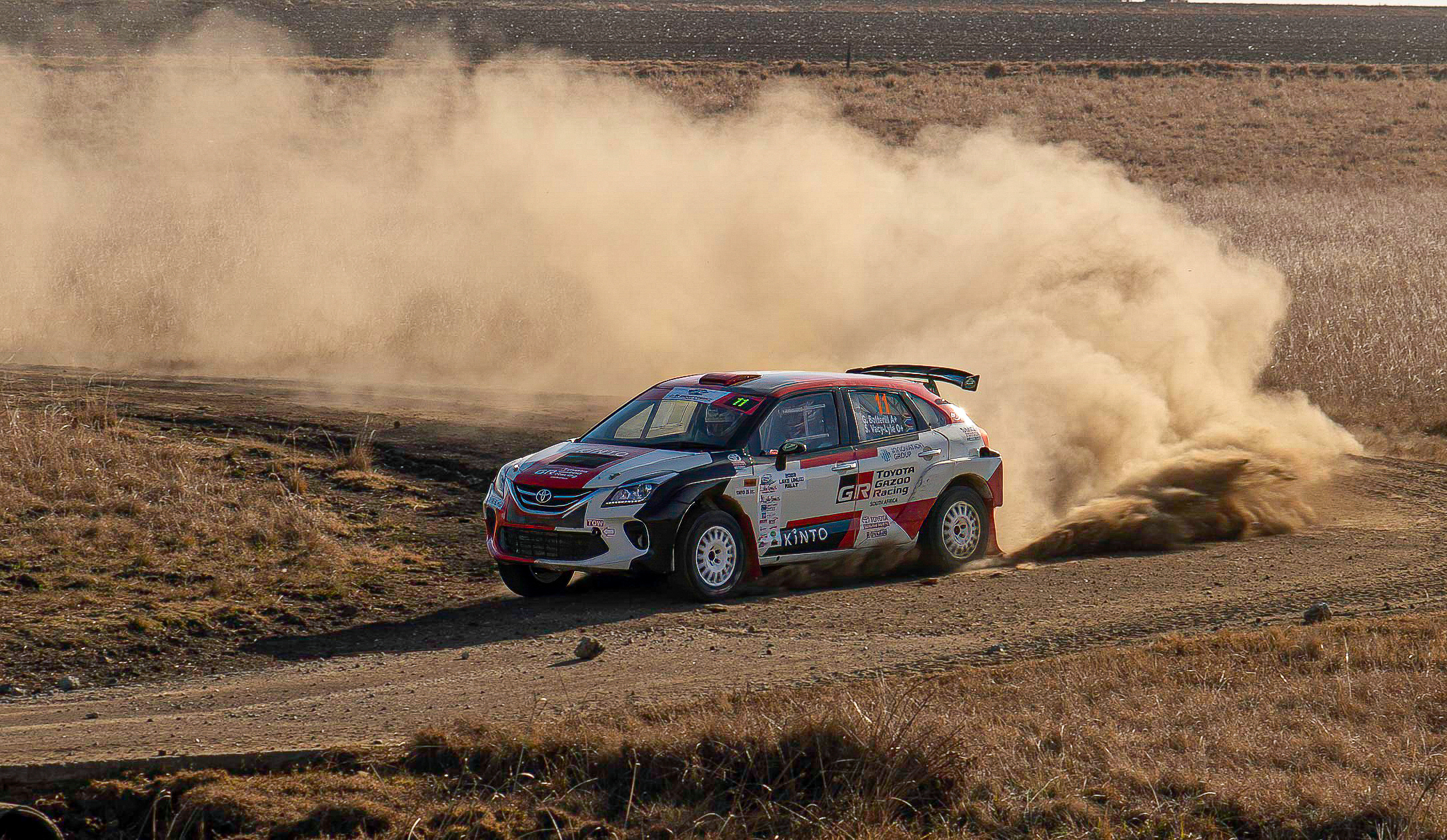
Guy Botterill - Toyota Starlet AR 1 Rally Car

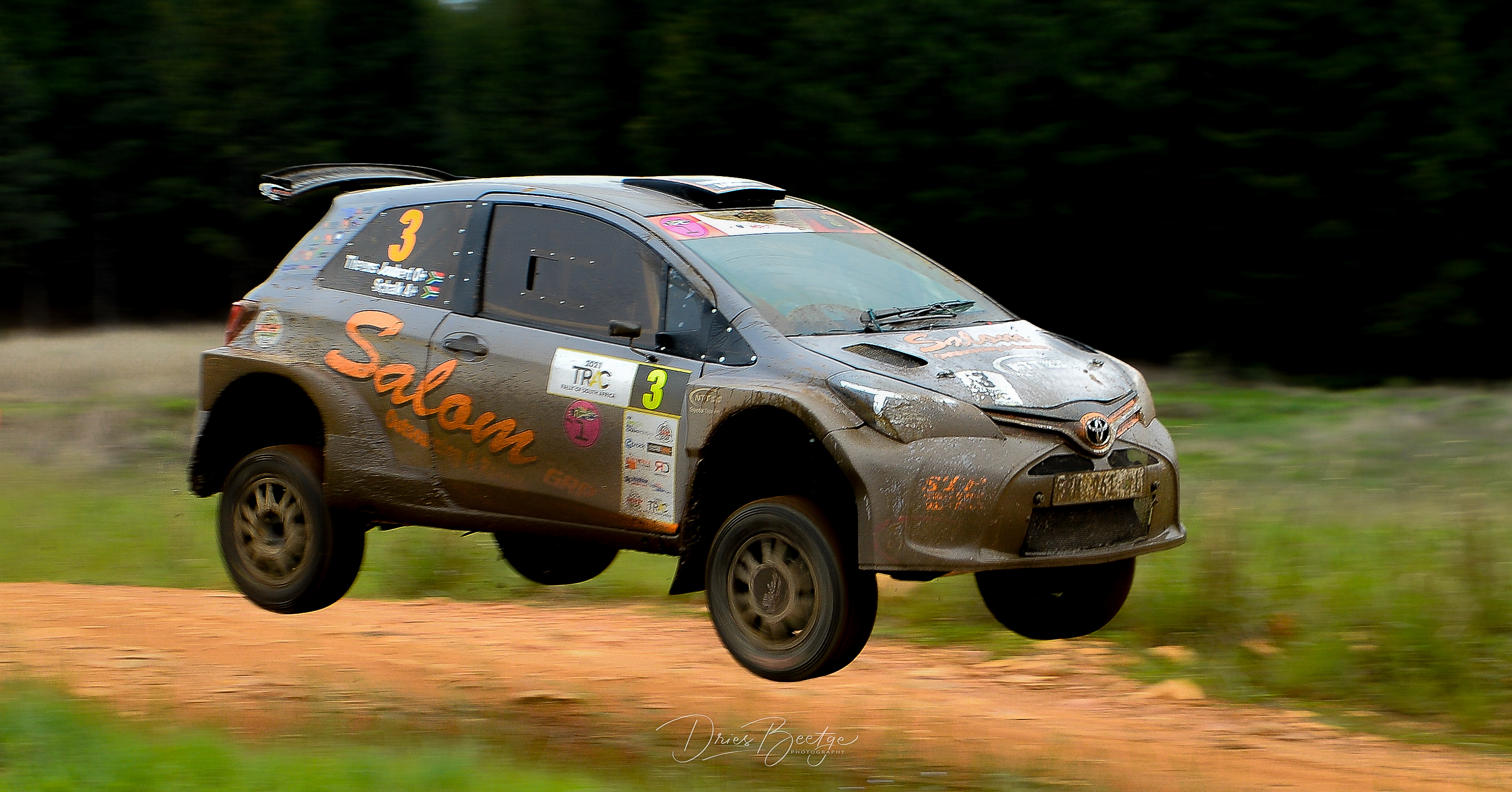
Salom Racing - Theuns Joubert and Schalk Van Heerden

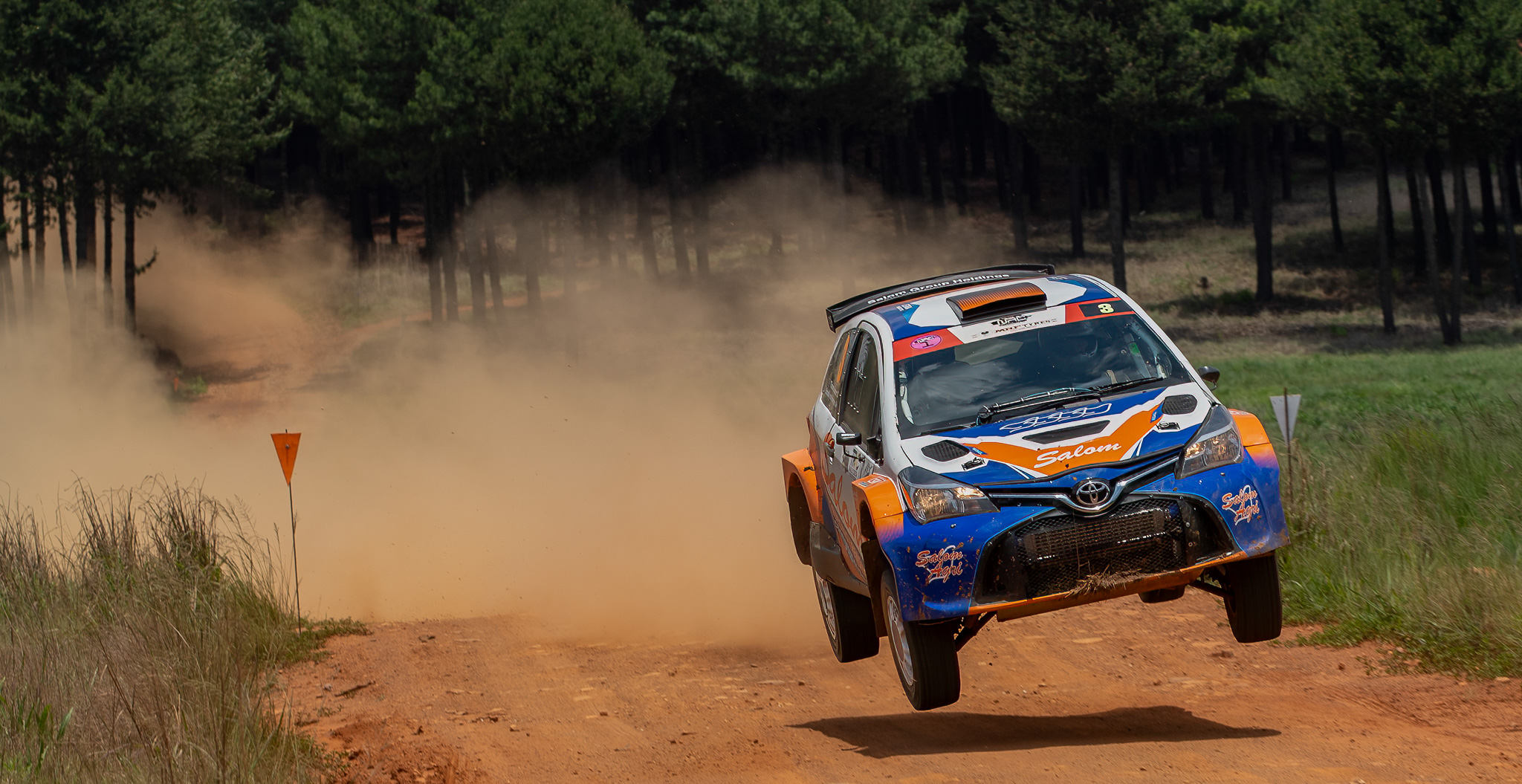
Theuns Joubert and Schalk Van Heerden - Toyota Auris - 2023 TRAC Rally

Now in its 61st consecutive year, the sport has been kept alive by privateers since 2017 with the decline of sponsorships and non inv-lvement of manufacturers due to the world wid- economic slow dow.

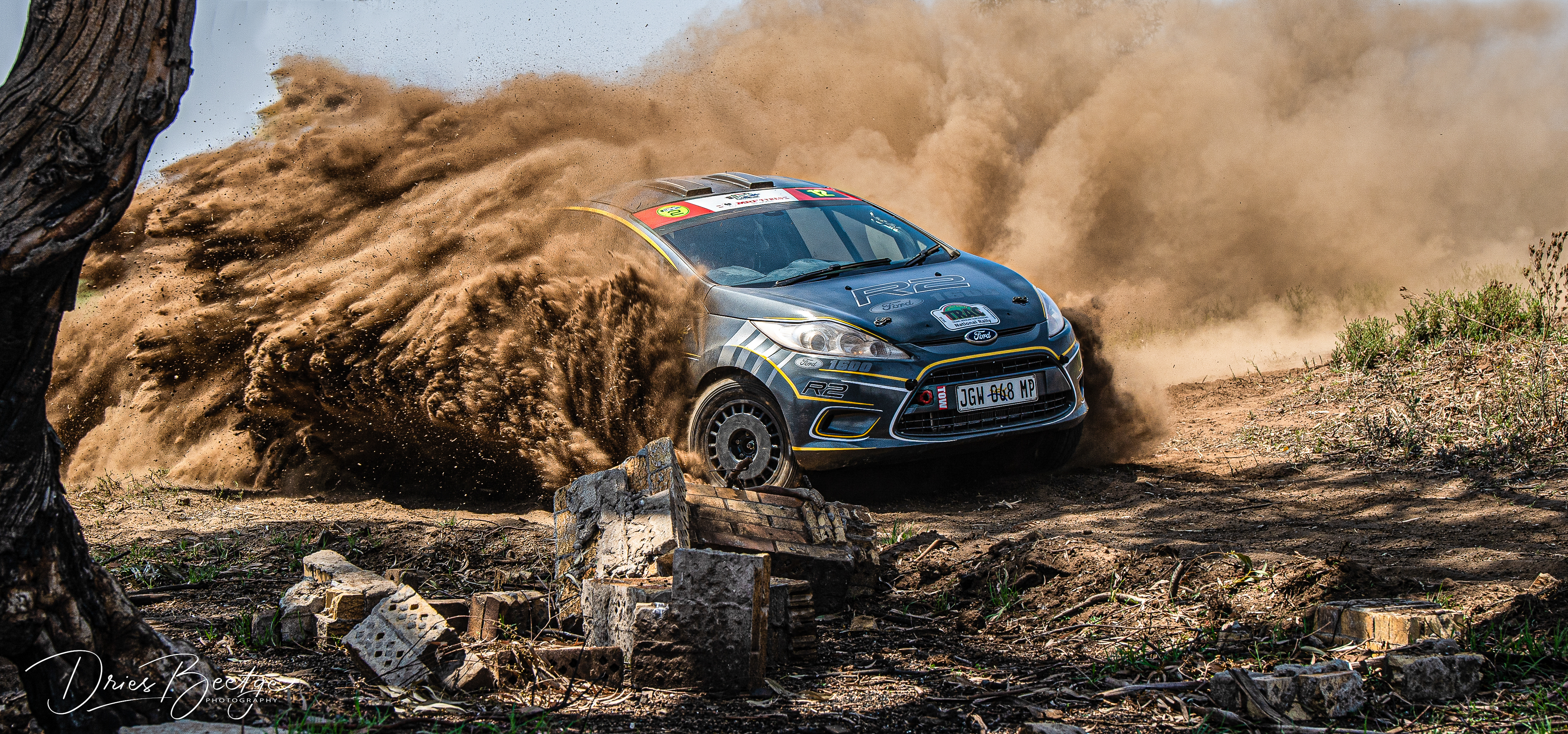
Ford Focus R2 Driven by J.J Potgieter. Co-Driver Tommie Du Toit

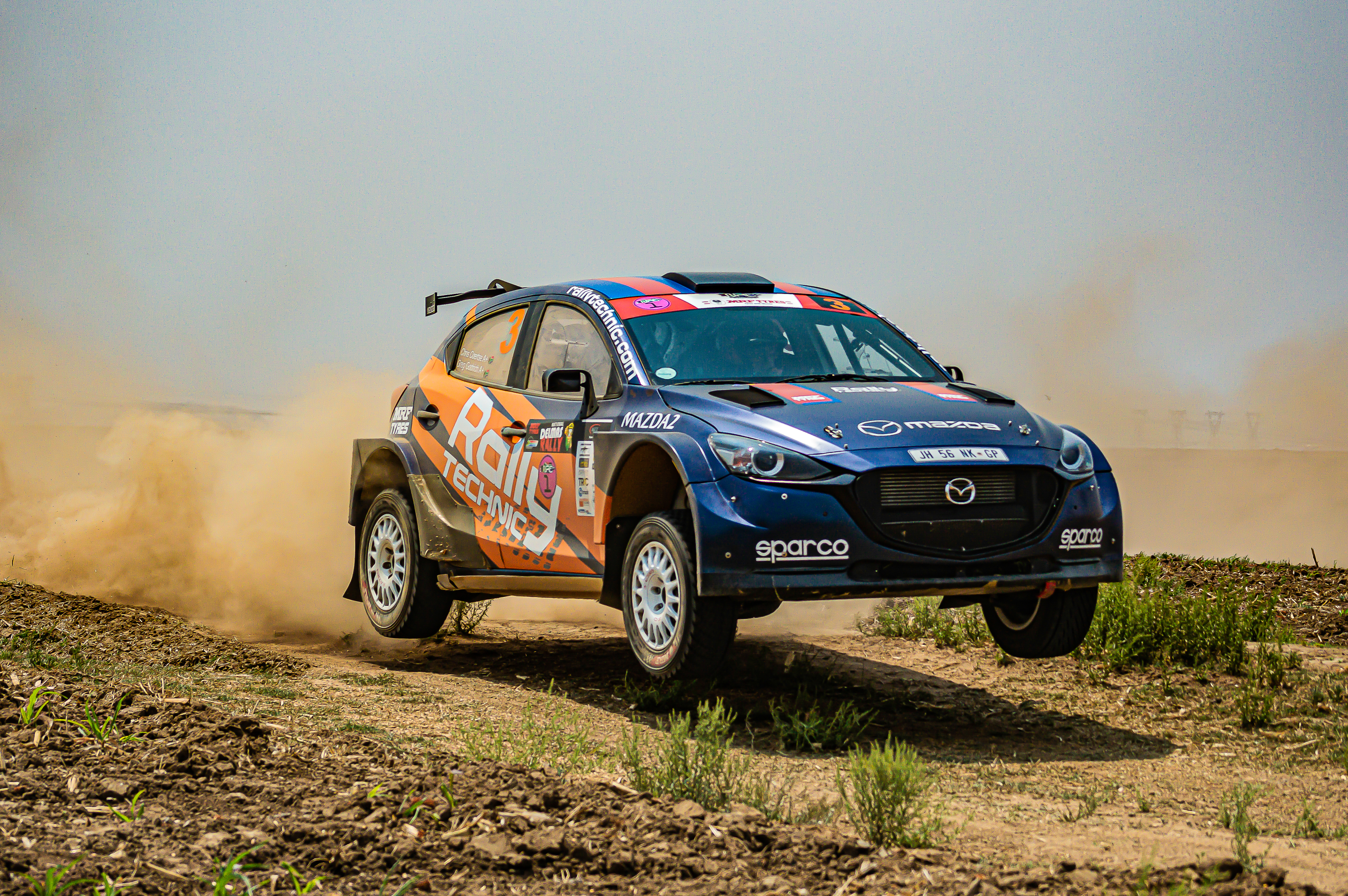
Chris Coertse Mazda 2 Rally 2 kit. Co-Driver Greg Godrich

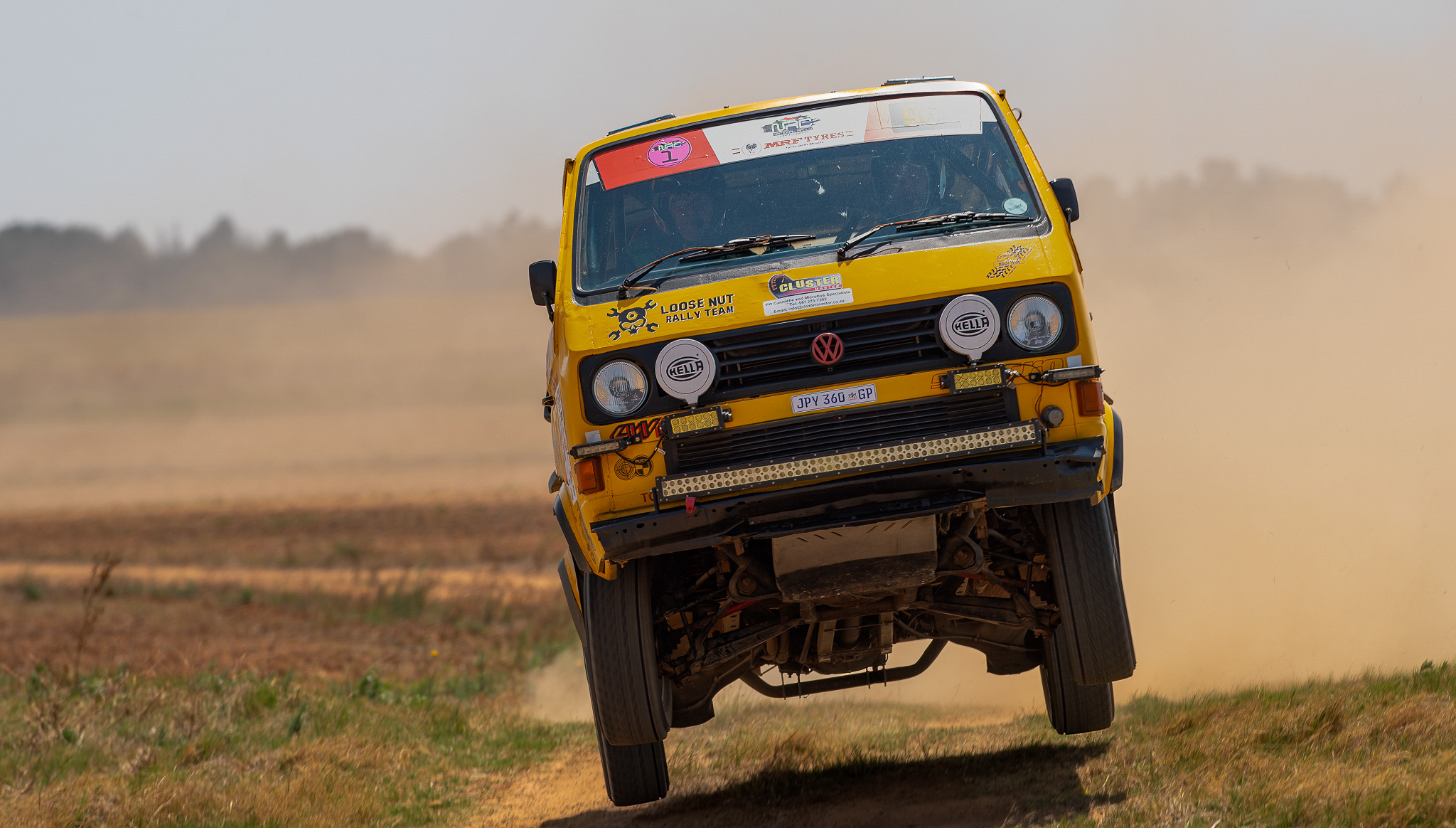

The NRC 1 class took over from the 1600 R2 homologated cars as the official Championship class of the SA Championship.

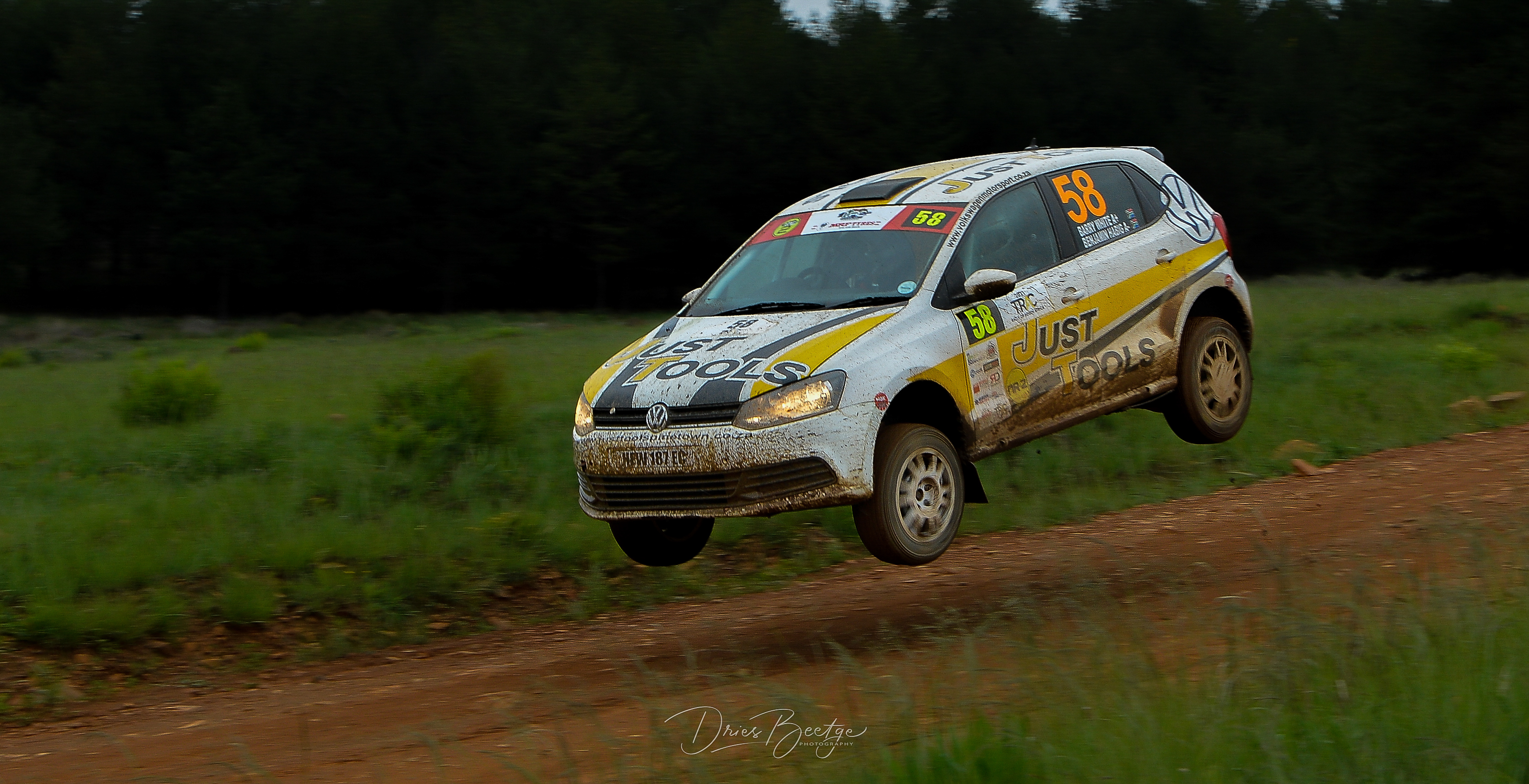
Benjamin Habig and Co-Driver Barry White.

== South African Rally Champions ==
Year	Driver	Co-Driver	Car
1960	Ewold van Bergen	Alan van Niekerk	Austin A40
1961	Pieter Muhl	Reinhard Muhl	Auto Union
1962	Pieter Muhl	Reinhard Muhl	Auto Union
1963	Jan Hettema	Reinhard Muhl	Alfa Romeo / Auto Union
1964	Ewold van Bergen	Rex Wakley-Smith	Datsun
1965	Ewold van Bergen	Rex Wakley-Smith	Datsun
1966	Francis Tucker	Raggy Schjolberg	Volvo
1967	Jan Hettema	Robbie Broekmeyer	Volvo
1968	Jan Hettema	Raggy Schjolberg	Toyota
1969	Jan Hettema	Franz Boshoff	Toyota
1970	Ewold van Bergen	Minota van Bergen	Datsun
1971	Elbie Odendaal	Christo Kuun	Alfa Romeo
1972	Elbie Odendaal	Christo Kuun	Datsun
1973	Louis Cloete	Christo Kuun	Chevrolet / Ford
1974	Lambert Fekken	Johan Borman	Ford
1975	Sarel van der Merwe	Brian Woodhead	Datsun
1976	Jan Hettema	Stuart Pegg	Ford
1977	Sarel van der Merwe	Richard Leeke	Datsun
1978	Sarel van der Merwe	Chris Hawkins	Ford Escort / Marina V8
1979	Sarel van der Merwe	Franz Boshoff	Ford Escort
1980	Sarel van der Merwe	Franz Boshoff	Ford Escort
1981	Sarel van der Merwe	Franz Boshoff	Ford Escort
1982	Sarel van der Merwe	Franz Boshoff	Ford Escort
1983	Sarel van der Merwe	Franz Boshoff	Audi Quattro
1984	Sarel van der Merwe	Franz Boshoff	Audi Quattro
1985	Sarel van der Merwe	Franz Boshoff	Audi Quattro
1986	Hannes Grobler	Piet Swanepoel	Nissan Skyline
1987	Geoff Mortimer	Franz Boshoff	Audi Quattro S1 E2
1988	Sarel van der Merwe	Franz Boshoff	Audi Quattro S1 E2
1989	Serge Damseaux	Vito Bonafede	Toyota Conquest 4x4
1990	Glyn Hall	Martin Botha	Volkswagen Golf GTi
1991	Hannes Grobler	Franz Boshoff	Nissan Sentra 4x4 / Ford Laser 4x4
1992	Serge Damseaux	Vito Bonafede	Toyota Conquest 4x4
1993	Serge Damseaux	Vito Bonafede	Toyota Conquest 4x4
1994	Serge Damseaux	Vito Bonafede	Toyota Conquest 4x4
1995	Serge Damseaux	Vito Bonafede	Toyota Conquest 4x4
1996	Serge Damseaux	Vito Bonafede	Toyota Conquest 4x4
1997	Jan Habig	Douglas Judd	Volkswagen Golf
1998	Serge Damseaux	Vito Bonafede	Toyota Conquest
1999	Jan Habig	Douglas Judd	Volkswagen Golf 4 Kit Car
2000	Serge Damseaux	Douglas Judd	Toyota Corolla
2001	Jan Habig	Douglas Judd	Volkswagen Golf
2002	Jan Habig	Douglas Judd	Volkswagen Golf
2003	Serge Damseaux	Robert Paisley	Toyota RunX
2004	Serge Damseaux	Robert Paisley	Toyota RunX
2005	Jan Habig	Douglas Judd	Volkswagen Golf / Polo S2000
2006	Enzo Kuun	Guy Hodgson	Volkswagen Polo S2000
2007	Jan Habig	Douglas Judd	Volkswagen Polo S2000
2008	Hergen Fekken	Pierre Arries	Volkswagen Polo S2000
2009	Hergen Fekken	Pierre Arries	Volkswagen Polo S2000
2010	Enzo Kuun	Guy Hodgson	Volkswagen Polo S2000
2011	Conrad Rautenbach	Robin Houghton	Ford Fiesta S2000
2012	Mark Cronje	Robin Houghton	Ford Fiesta S2000
2013	Mark Cronje	Robin Houghton	Ford Fiesta S2000
2014	Leeroy Poulter	Elvene Coetzee	Toyota Yaris S2000
2015	Mark Cronje	Elvene Coetzee	Ford Fiesta S2000 / Toyota Yaris S2000
2016	Leeroy Poulter	Elvene Coetzee	Toyota Yaris S2000
2017	Guy Botterill	Simon Vacy-Lyle	Toyota Etios R2
2018	Guy Botterill	Simon Vacy-Lyle	Toyota Etios R2
2019	Guy Botterill	Simon Vacy-Lyle	Toyota Etios R2
2020	Guy Botterill	Simon-Vacy Lyle	Toyota Etios Rally 2 Kit
2021	Theuns Joubert	Schalk Van Heerden	Toyota Auris S2000
2022	Chris Coertse	Greg Godrich	Mazda 2 Rally 2 Kit
2023	Johannes Potgieter	Tommy Du Toit	Hyundai i20
2024	(4 WD) Chris Coertse	Carolyn Swan	Mazda 2 Rally 2 Kit
2024	(2 WD) Anton Raaths	Isabel Raaths	Toyota RunX 1600cc
2025	(4WD) Benjamin Habig jr	Barry White	Volkswagen Polo 2000cc Turbo
2025	(2 WD) Russel Stone	Jonty Brown	Toyota RunX 1600cc

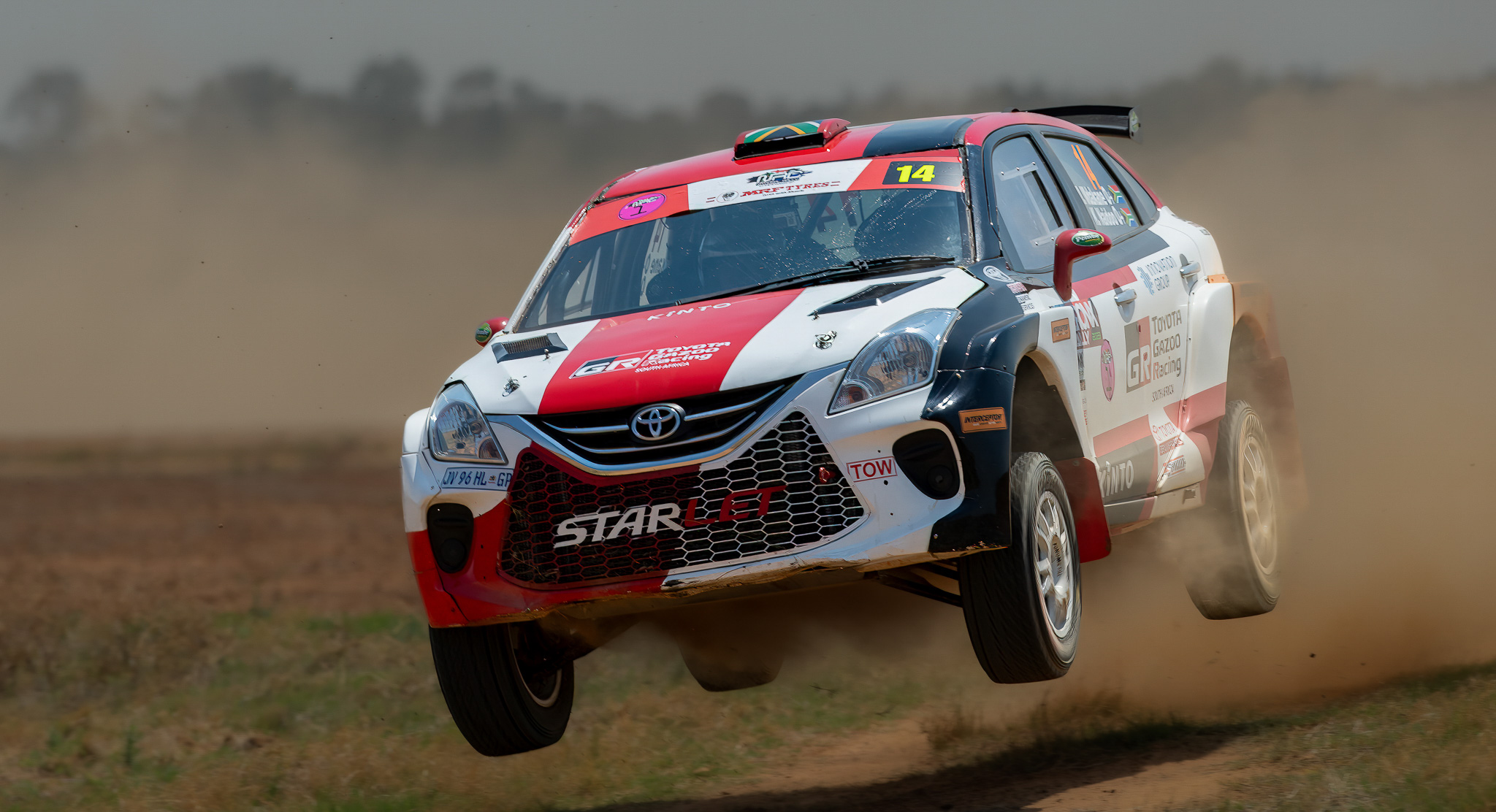

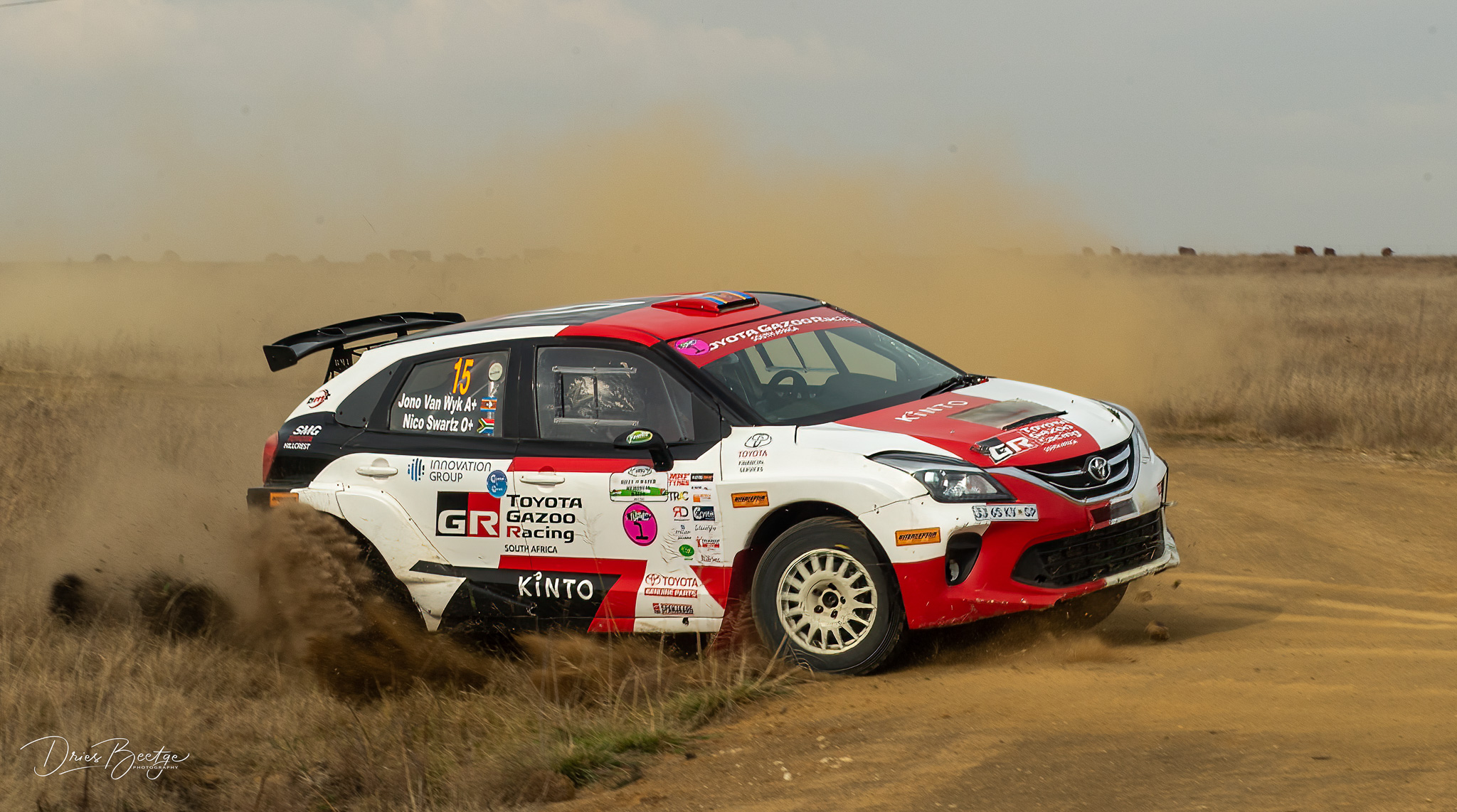
Jono Van Wyk

== Champion Manufacturers ==
YEAR	CHAMPION
1968	Volvo
1969	Volvo
1970	Alfa Romeo
1971	Alfa Romeo
1972	Ford
1973	Datsun
1974	Datsun
1975	Not Awarded
1976	Ford
1977	Datsun
1978	Datsun
1979	Datsun
1980	Nissan
1981	Toyota
1982	Toyota
1983	Toyota
1984	Nissan
1985	Volkswagen
1986	Nissan
1987	Nissan
1988	Volkswagen
1989	Toyota
1990	Toyota
1991	Volkswagen
1992	Volkswagen
1993	Volkswagen
1994	Volkswagen
1995	Toyota
1996	Volkswagen
1997	Volkswagen
1998	Toyota
1999	Toyota
2000	Toyota
2001	Toyota
2002	Toyota
2003	Toyota
2004	Toyota
2005	Toyota
2006	Toyota
2007	Toyota
2008	Toyota
2009	Toyota
2010	Toyota
2011	Toyota
2012	Ford
2013	Toyota
2014	Toyota
2015	Toyota
2016	Toyota
2017	Not Awarded
2018	Not Awarded
2019	Not Awarded
2020	Not Awarded
2021	Not Awarded
2022	Not Awarded
2023	Not Awarded
2024	Not Awarded
2025	Not Awarded

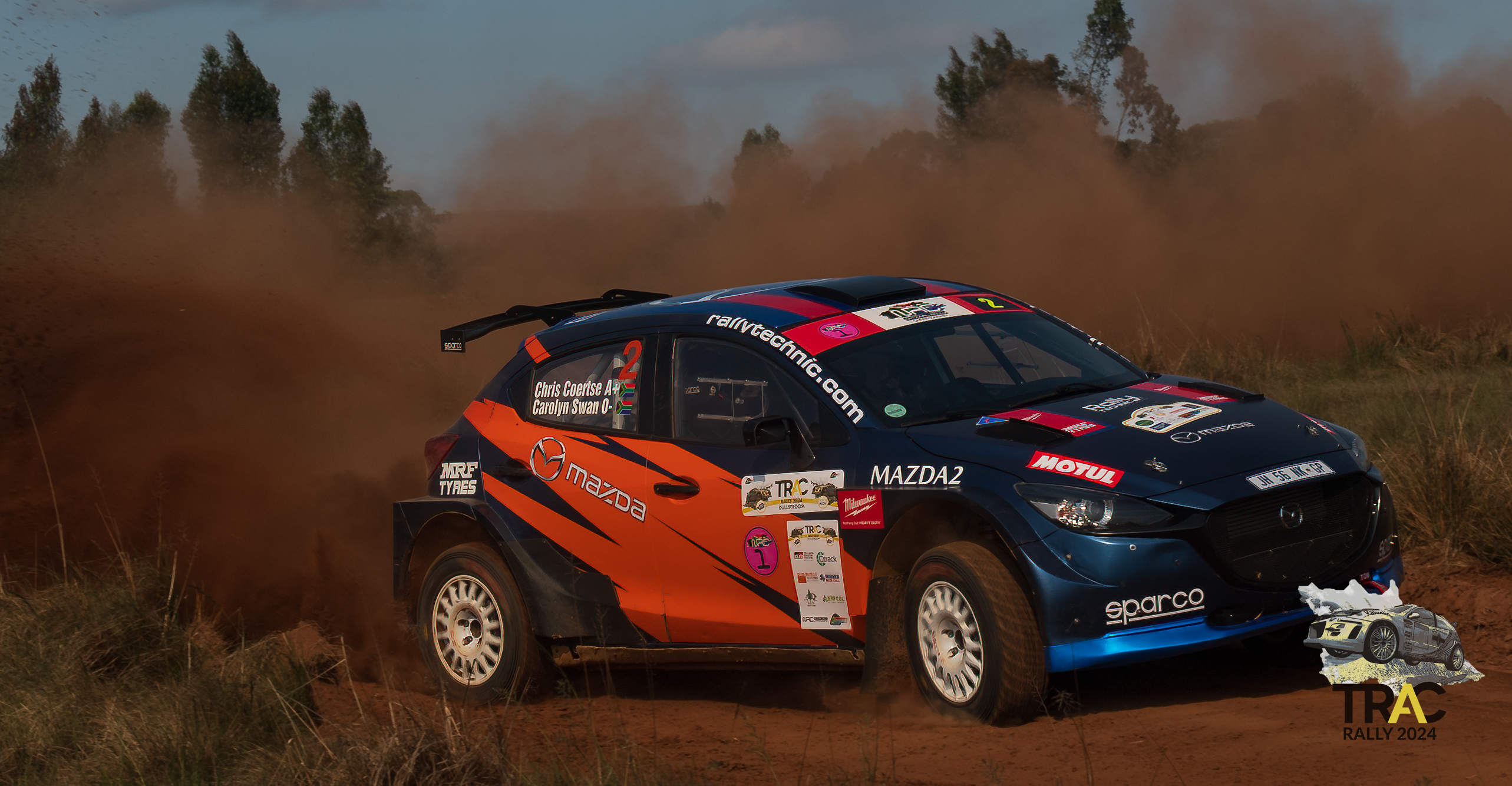

== Championship Wins ==
=== Drivers ===
Driver	Wins
Sarel van der Merwe	11
Serge Damseaux	10
Jan Habig	6
Jan Hettema	5
Ewold van Bergen	4
Guy Botterill	4
Mark Cronje	3
Elbie Odendaal	2
Pieter Muhl	2
Hannes Grobler	2
Enzo Kuun	2
Hergen Fekken	2
Leeroy Poulter	2
Chris Coertse	2
Francis Tucker	1
Louis Cloete	1
Lambert Fekken	1
Geoff Mortimer	1
Glyn Hall	1
Conrad Rautenbach	1
Theuns Joubert	1
Johannes Potgieter	1
Anton Raaths (2WD)	1
(4WD) Benjamin Habig jr	1
( 2WD ) Russel Stone	1

=== Co-Drivers ===
Co-Driver	Wins
Franz Boshoff	11
Vito Bonafede	7
Douglas Judd	7
Reinhard Muhl	3
Christo Kuun	3
Robin Houghton	3
Elvene Coetzee	3
Simon Vacy-Lyle	4
Rex Wakley-Smith	2
Raggy Schjolberg	2
Robert Paisley	2
Guy Hodgson	2
Pierre Arries	2
Alan van Niekerk	1
Robbie Broekmeyer	1
Minota van Bergen	1
Johan Borman	1
Brian Woodhead	1
Stuart Pegg	1
Richard Leeke	1
Chris Hawkins	1
Piet Swanepoel	1
Martin Botha	1
Schalk Van Heerden	1
Greg Godrich	1
Tommy Du Toit	1
(4WD) Carolyn Swan	1
(4WD)Barry White	

=== Manufacturers ===
Manufacturer	Wins
Toyota	38
Datsun / Nissan	9
Volkswagen	9
Ford	3
Volvo	2
Alfa Romeo	2
Mazda	2
Hyundai	1

== Rally Wins ==
=== Co-Drivers ===
Co-Driver	Wins
Franz Boshoff	73
Vito Bonafede	52
Douglas Judd	36
Guy Hodgson	24
Robert Paisley	21
Simon Vacy-Lyle	21
Robin Houghton	18
Mike Hooper	15
Pierre Arries	15
Elvene Vonk (Coetzee)	13
Brian Woodhead	10
Reinhard Muhl	9
Richard Leeke	9
Greg Godrich	9
Barry White	9
Nico Swartz	9
Gus Crous	8
Raggy Schjolberg	8
Christo Kuun	8
Willem van Heerden	8
Rex Wakely-Smith	7
Minota van Bergen	7
Schalk Van Heerden	7
Johan Borman	6
Peter Marsh	6
Carolyn Swan	6
Piet Swanepoel	5
Alan van Niekerk	4
Tom Oerder	4
Stuart Pegg	4
Reg Ridden	4
Tommie Du Toit	4
Robbie Broekmeyer	3
Peter Cuffley	3
Nicholas Klinger	3
Hennie Steenkamp	2
Tom Campher	2
Scamp Porter	2
Gus Menzies	2
W Wedel	2
Peter Withers	2
Ronel Behm	2
Chris Hawkins	2
Martin Botha	2
Gideon Trollip	2
Andre Vermuelen	2
Drew Sturrock	2
Cobus Very	2
Bjorn Degandt	2
Gerhard Snyman	2
Henry Kohne	2
Nic van Vuuren	1
D Palmer	1
Willem du Toit	1
T Smith	1
T D van Rooyen	1
Piet van Rooyen	1
Len Withers	1
Dave Higson-Smith	1
Leon Joubert	1
J Swart	1
Jan Kriek	1
Vic Deiner	1
Louis Joubert	1
Dave Richards	1
Wiley Harrington	1
Steve Harding	1
Johan Sieling	1
Martie Olivier	1
Nic Hadden	1
Christopher Pichon	1
Matt Kohler	1
Rikus Fourie	1

=== Manufacturer Rally Wins ===
Manufacturer	Wins
Toyota	124
Ford	80
Volkswagen	10
Datsun / Nissan	51
Audi	39
Volvo	19
Auto Union	9
Chevrolet	8
Opel	7
Mazda	7
Alfa Romeo	6
Renault	5
Austin	4
Daewoo	4
Hyundai	4
DKW	3
Subaru	3
Hillman	2
Triumph	2
Rambler	2
Hyundai	1

== Season Results ==
=== 1960 ===
Round	Rally	Driver	Co-Driver	Car
1	Transvaal Trial	Colin Hedge	Rex Wakley-Smith	Volvo 122 S
2	Tour Natal	Gene Bosman	Nic van Vuuren	Hillman Minx
3	Protea Trial	Ewold van Bergen	Alan van Niekerk	Austin A40
4	Amatola Rally	Ewold van Bergen	Alan van Niekerk	Austin A40
5	3rd International Total Rally	Ewold van Bergen	Alan van Niekerk	Austin A40
6	African Alpine Rally	Pieter Muhl	Reinhard Muhl	Auto Union
	CHAMPIONS	Ewold van Bergen	Alan van Niekerk	Not Awarded

=== 1961 ===
Round	Rally	Driver	Co-Driver	Car
1	Tour Natal	Ewold van Bergen	Hennie Steenkamp	Austin A40
2	Protea Trial	Pieter Muhl	Reinhard Muhl	Auto Union
3	Amatola Rally	Jan Hettema	Tom Oerder	Alfa Romeo
4	4th International Total Rally	Leicester Symons	Ray Hauptfleisch	Volkswagen
5	SAM 400	Pieter Muhl	Reinhard Muhl	Auto Union
6	SA Alpine Rally	Cancelled		
7	Vaal Gold Cup Trial	D W Campbell	Rex Wakley-Smith	Alfa Romeo
	CHAMPIONS	Pieter Muhl	Reinhard Muhl	Not Awarded

=== 1962 ===
Round	Rally	Driver	Co-Driver	Car
1	Tour Natal	Gene Bosman	Tom Campher	Hillman Minx
2	Protea Trial	Geoff Palmer	D Palmer	Triumph
3	Amatola Rally	Pieter Muhl	Reinhard Muhl	Auto Union
4	Desert Trial	Cancelled		
5	SAM 400	Pieter Muhl	Reinhard Muhl	Auto Union
6	5th International Total Rally	Phil Porter	Scamp Porter	Renault Dauphine
7	Vaal Gold Cup	Pieter Muhl	Reinhard Muhl	Auto Union
	CHAMPIONS	Pieter Muhl	Reinhard Muhl	Not Awarded

=== 1963 ===
Round	Rally	Driver	Co-Driver	Car
1	Transvaal Trial	Pieter Muhl	Reinhard Muhl	Auto Union
2	SAM 400	Jan Hettema	Tom Oerder	Alfa Romeo
3	Tour Natal	Jimmy Andrews	Tom Campher	Volvo
4	Cape Double 12	Pieter Muhl	Reinhard Muhl	Auto Union
5	Protea Trial	Pieter Muhl	Reinhard Muhl	Auto Union
6	Amatola Rally	Jan Hettema	Tom Oerder	Alfa Romeo
7	6th International Total Rally	Jan Hettema	Hennie Steenkamp	Volvo
8	Vaal Gold Cup	Ewold van Bergen	Rex Wakely-Smith	Datsun
	CHAMPIONS	Jan Hettema	Reinhard Muhl	Not Awarded

=== 1964 ===
Round	Rally	Driver	Co-Driver	Car
1	SAM 400	Ewold van Bergen	Rex Wakely-Smith	Datsun
2	Transvaal Trial	Jan Hettema	Tom Oerder	Volvo
3	Cape Double 12	Gene Bosman	Willem du Toit	Volvo
4	Protea Trial	Chris Swanepoel	Gus Crous	Renault
5	Moonlight Rally	Ewold van Bergen	Rex Wakely-Smith	Datsun
6	7th International Total Rally	Phil Porter	Scamp Porter	Renault
7	Tour Natal	Ewold van Bergen	Rex Wakely-Smith	Datsun
8	Vaal Gold Cup	No Results		
	CHAMPIONS	Ewold van Bergen	Rex Wakely-Smith	Not Awarded

=== 1965 ===
Round	Rally	Driver	Co-Driver	Car
1	SAM 400	Sonny Tompson	T Smith	Volvo
2	Transvaal Trial	Jimmy Andrews	Gus Menzies	Volvo
3	Trial Oranje	Laurie Swanepoel	T D van Rooyen	DKW
4	Vaal Gold Cup	Neels Vermaak	W Wedel	Alfa Romeo
5	Cape Double 12	Francis Tucker	Raggy Schjolberg	Volvo
6	Protea Trial	Chris Swanepoel	Gus Crous	DKW
7	Goldfields 250	Ewold van Bergen	Rex Wakely-Smith	Datsun
8	Moonlight Rally	P M Gordon	Peter Withers	Opel
9	8th International Total Rally	Jan Hettema	Gus Menzies	Volvo
10	Tour Natal	Chris Swanepoel	Gus Crous	DKW
	CHAMPIONS	Ewold van Bergen	Rex Wakely-Smith	Not Awarded

=== 1966 ===
Round	Rally	Driver	Co-Driver	Car
1	SAM 400	P M Gordon	Pieter Withers	Opel
2	Transvaal Trial	Neels Vermaak	W Wedel	Volkswagen
3	Cape Double 12	Francis Tucker	Raggy Schjolberg	Volvo
4	Protea Trial	Ewold van Bergen	Piet van Rooyen	Datsun
5	Moonlight Rally	Jan Hettema	Mike Hooper	Volvo
6	Trial Oranje	Gerry Gericke	Christo Kuun	Anglia
7	9th International Total Rally	Jan Hettema	Mike Hooper	Volvo
8	Tour Natal	Jan Hettema	Mike Hooper	Volvo
9	Vaal Gold Cup	P M Gordon	Len Withers	Opel
	CHAMPIONS	Francis Tucker	Raggy Schjolberg	Not Awarded

=== 1967 ===
Round	Rally	Driver	Co-Driver	Car
1	Transvaal Trial	Jan Hettema	Mike Hooper	Volvo
2	Cape Double 12	Jan Hettema	Mike Hooper	Volvo
3	Protea Trial	Jan Hettema	Mike Hooper	Volvo
4	Goldfields 250	Jan Hettema	Robbie Broekmeyer	Volvo
5	Moonlight Rally	Ewold van Bergen	Mike Hooper	Datsun
6	10th International Total Rally	Jan Hettema	Robbie Broekmeyer	Volvo
7	Tour Natal	Robin Thompson	Ronel Behm	Opel
	CHAMPIONS	Jan Hettema	Robbie Broekmeyer	Volvo

=== 1968 ===
Round	Rally	Driver	Co-Driver	Car
1	Transvaal Trial	Ewold van Bergen	Mike Hooper	Datsun
2	Protea Trial	Chris Swanepoel	Gus Crous	Rambler
3	Castrol Goldfields 200	Francis Tucker	Robbie Broekmeyer	Volvo
4	Moonlight Rally	Jan Hettema	Raggy Schjolberg	Toyota
5	11th International Total Rally	Chris Swanepoel	Gus Crous	Rambler
6	Tour Natal	Jan Hettema	Raggy Schjolberg	Toyota
7	Vaal Gold Cup	Gerry Gericke	Mike Hooper	Triumph
	CHAMPIONS	Jan Hettema	Raggy Schjolberg	Volvo

=== 1969 ===
Round	Rally	Driver	Co-Driver	Car
1	Transvaal Trial	Chris Swanepoel	Gus Crous	Renault 8 Gordini
2	Castrol Goldfields 200	Ewold van Bergen	Minota van Bergen	Datsun
3	Tour Des Fleurs	Jan Hettema	Raggy Schjolberg	Toyota
4	Protea Trial	Ewold van Bergen	Minota van Bergen	Datsun
5	Moonlight Rally	Jan Hettema	Mike Hooper	Toyota
6	12th International Total Rally	Chris Swanepoel	Gus Crous	Renault 8 Gordini
7	Tour Natal	Jan Hettema	Raggy Schjolberg	Toyota
8	Vaal Gold Cup	Ewold van Bergen	Minota van Bergen	Datsun
	CHAMPIONS	Jan Hettema	Franz Boshoff	Volvo

=== 1970 ===
Round	Rally	Driver	Co-Driver	Car
1	Transvaal Trial	Dave Howcroft	Franz Boshoff	Volvo
2	Rally of 1000 Hills	Jan Hettema	Raggy Schjolberg	Toyota
3	Castrol Goldfields 200	Ewold van Bergen	Minota van Bergen	Datsun
4	SAM 400	Jan Hettema	Raggy Schjolberg	Toyota
5	13th International Total Rally	Ewold van Bergen	Minota van Bergen	Datsun
6	Protea Rally	Chris Swanepoel	Gus Crous	Renault
7	Oranje Trial	Gene Bosman	Alan van Niekerk	Alfa Romeo
	CHAMPIONS	Ewold van Bergen	Minota van Bergen	Alfa Romeo

=== 1971 ===
Round	Rally	Driver	Co-Driver	Car
1	Tour Natal	Jan Hettema	Willem van Heerden	Ford
2	Moonlight Rally	Jan Hettema	Willem van Heerden	Ford
3	Trial Oranje	Ewold van Bergen	Minota van Bergen	Datsun
4	Molyslip 400	Ewold van Bergen	Minota van Bergen	Datsun
5	Lucky Strike Trial	Jan Hettema	Dave Higson-Smith	Ford
	CHAMPIONS	Elbie Odendaal	Christo Kuun	Alfa Romeo

=== 1972 ===
Round	Rally	Driver	Co-Driver	Car
1	Tour Natal	Jan Hettema	Willem van Heerden	Ford
2	Moonlight Rally	Jan Hettema	Willem van Heerden	Ford
3	Molyslip Rally	Elbie Odendaal	Christo Kuun	Datsun
4	15th International Total Rally	Elbie Odendaal	Christo Kuun	Datsun
5	Pretoria News Rally	Elbie Odendaal	Christo Kuun	Datsun
6	Lucky Strike Rally	Elbie Odendaal	Christo Kuun	Datsun
7	Tour Natal	Elbie Odendaal	Christo Kuun	Datsun
	CHAMPIONS	Elbie Odendaal	Christo Kuun	Ford

=== 1973 ===
Round	Rally	Driver	Co-Driver	Car
1	Lucas Rally	Lambert Fekken	Johan Borman	Ford
2	Duckhams Rally	Jan Hettema	Leon Joubert	Chevrolet
3	Tour Natal	Lambert Fekken	Johan Borman	Ford
4	Molyslip Rally	Jan Hettema	Willem van Heerden	Chevrolet
5	Castrol Rally	Jan Hettema	Willem van Heerden	Chevrolet
6	Daily News Rally	Elbie Odendaal	Christo Kuun	Ford
7	16th International Total Rally	Tony Fall	Franz Boshoff	Datsun
8	Castrol Protea Rally	Elbie Odendaal	Christo Kuun	Ford
	CHAMPIONS	Louis Cloete	Christo Kuun	Datsun

=== 1974 ===
Round	Rally	Driver	Co-Driver	Car
1	Castrol Rally	Geoff Mortimer	Willem van Heerden	Marina V8
2	Lucas Rally	Lambert Fekken	Johan Borman	Ford
3	Pretoria News Rally	Schalk Burger	J Swart	Ford
4	Tour Natal	Roelof Fekken	Mike Hooper	Alfetta
5	Duckhams Rally	Sarel van der Merwe	Brian Woodhead	Datsun
	CHAMPIONS	Lambert Fekken	Johan Borman	Datsun

=== 1975 ===
Round	Rally	Driver	Co-Driver	Car
1	Tour Natal	Geoff Mortimer	Chris Hawkins	Marina V8
2	Duckhams Rally	Roelof Fekken	Johan Borman	Ford
3	Castrol 1000 Rally	Sarel van der Merwe	Franz Boshoff	Datsun
4	Protea Rally	Hein Dahms	Ronel Dahms	Toyota
5	Molyslip Rally	Sarel van der Merwe	Franz Boshoff	Datsun
6	Valvoline Rally	Sarel van der Merwe	Franz Boshoff	Datsun
	CHAMPIONS	Sarel van der Merwe	Brian Woodhead	Not Awarded

=== 1976 ===
Round	Rally	Driver	Co-Driver	Car
1	Castrol 1000 Rally	Sarel van der Merwe	Mike Hooper	Toyota
2	Valvoline Rally	Jan Hettema	Stuart Pegg	Ford Escort
3	Molyslip Rally	Roelof Fekken	Johan Borman	Ford Escort
4	Castrol Rally	Andre Liebenberg	Jan Kriek	Ford Escort
5	Total n'Thabeni	Jannie Kuun	Christo Kuun	Datsun
6	Duckhams Rally	Jochi Kleint	Franz Boshoff	Datsun
7	Asseng Rally	Roelof Fekken	Johan Borman	Ford Escort
8	Lucas Rally	Jan Hettema	Stuart Pegg	Ford Escort
	CHAMPIONS	Jan Hettema	Stuart Pegg	Ford

=== 1977 ===
Round	Rally	Driver	Co-Driver	Car
1	Asseng Rally	Sarel van der Merwe	Richard Leeke	Chevrolet
2	Molyslip Rally	Kassie Coetzee	Vic Deiner	Datsun
3	Tour de Valvoline	Geoff Mortimer	Chris Hawkins	Marina V8
4	Valvoline Rally	Sarel van der Merwe	Richard Leeke	Datsun
5	Castrol Rally	Jan Hettema	Louis Joubert	Ford Escort
6	Duckhams Rally	Sarel van der Merwe	Richard Leeke	Datsun
7	Salora Rally	Jan Hettema	Franz Boshoff	Ford Escort
8	Total n'Thabeni	Jan Hettema	Franz Boshoff	Ford Escort
	CHAMPIONS	Sarel van der Merwe	Richard Leeke	Datsun

=== 1978 ===
Round	Rally	Driver	Co-Driver	Car
1	Molyslip Rally	Tony Pond	Mike Hooper	Chevrolet Chevair
2	Tour de Valvoline	Jan Hettema	Franz Boshoff	Datsun 140Y
3	Duckhams Rally	Sarel van der Merwe	Richard Leeke	Ford Escort
4	Castrol International Rally	Tony Pond	Dave Richards	Chevrolet Chevair
5	Fiat 2000 Rally	Jan Hettema	Franz Boshoff	Datsun 140Y
6	Castrol 1000 Rally	Sarel van der Merwe	Mike Hooper	Ford Escort
7	Nashua Rally	Sarel van der Merwe	Mike Hooper	Ford Escort
	CHAMPIONS	Sarel van der Merwe	Chris Hawkins	Datsun

=== 1979 ===
Round	Rally	Driver	Co-Driver	Car
1	Molyslip Rally	Sarel van der Merwe	Franz Boshoff	Ford Escort
2	Tour de Valvoline	Sarel van der Merwe	Franz Boshoff	Ford Escort
3	Valvoline Rally	Sarel van der Merwe	Franz Boshoff	Ford Escort
4	Castrol 1000 Rally	Sarel van der Merwe	Franz Boshoff	Ford Escort
5	Duckhams Rally	Tony Pond	Richard Leeke	Chevrolet Chevair
6	Castrol International Rally	Leif Asterhag	Willem van Heerden	Toyota Corolla
7	Fiat 2000 Rally	Eric Sanders	Reg Ridden	Datsun 160J
8	Radio 5 Rally	Leif Asterhag	Willem van Heerden	Toyota Corolla
9	Hepolite International	Geoff Mortimer	Richard Leeke	Chevrolet Chevair
10	Monsanto Rally	Sarel van der Merwe	Franz Boshoff	Ford Escort
	CHAMPIONS	Sarel van der Merwe	Franz Boshoff	Datsun

=== 1980 ===
Round	Rally	Driver	Co-Driver	Car
1	Molyslip Rally	Sarel van der Merwe	Franz Boshoff	Ford Escort
2	Tour de Valvoline	Sarel van der Merwe	Franz Boshoff	Ford Escort
3	1000 Hills Rally	Sarel van der Merwe	Franz Boshoff	Ford Escort
4	Datsun International Rally	Tony Pond	Richard Leeke	Datsun Stanza
5	Castrol Rally	Sarel van der Merwe	Franz Boshoff	Ford Escort
6	Fiat 2000 Rally	Sarel van der Merwe	Franz Boshoff	Ford Escort
7	Radio 5 International Rally	Tony Pond	Richard Leeke	Datsun Stanza
8	Hepolite International	Sarel van der Merwe	Franz Boshoff	Ford Escort
9	Valvoline Rally	Sarel van der Merwe	Franz Boshoff	Ford Escort
	CHAMPIONS	Sarel van der Merwe	Franz Boshoff	Nissan

=== 1981 ===
Round	Rally	Driver	Co-Driver	Car
1	Molyslip Rally	Sarel van der Merwe	Franz Boshoff	Ford Escort
2	Tour de Valvoline	Sarel van der Merwe	Franz Boshoff	Ford Escort
3	Valvoline Rally	Sarel van der Merwe	Franz Boshoff	Ford Escort
4	QHS 1000 Rally	Sarel van der Merwe	Franz Boshoff	Ford Escort
5	Castrol Radio 5 Rally	Sarel van der Merwe	Franz Boshoff	Ford Escort
6	Datsun Rally	Sarel van der Merwe	Franz Boshoff	Ford Escort
7	Bonanza Sigma Rally	Geoff Mortimer	Brian Woodhead	Ford Escort
8	SA Auto Rally	Sarel van der Merwe	Franz Boshoff	Ford Escort
9	Protea International Rally	Leif Asterhag	Willem van Heerden	Toyota Corolla
10	Datsun Rally	Eric Sanders	Reg Ridden	Datsun Stanza
	CHAMPIONS	Sarel van der Merwe	Franz Boshoff	Toyota

=== 1982 ===
Round	Rally	Driver	Co-Driver	Car
1	Molyslip Rally	Sarel van der Merwe	Franz Boshoff	Ford Escort
2	Tour de Valvoline	Sarel van der Merwe	Franz Boshoff	Ford Escort
3	Mr X-Haust Mr Tyre Rally	Eric Sanders	Reg Ridden	Datsun Stanza
4	Datsun Rally	Sarel van der Merwe	Franz Boshoff	Ford Escort
5	Border Mountain Rally	Geoff Mortimer	Brian Woodhead	Ford Escort
6	Jurgens International Rally	Geoff Mortimer	Brian Woodhead	Ford Escort
7	Protea International Rally	Sarel van der Merwe	Franz Boshoff	Ford Escort
8	Datsun Rally	Sarel van der Merwe	Franz Boshoff	Ford Escort
	CHAMPIONS	Sarel van der Merwe	Franz Boshoff	Toyota

=== 1983 ===
Round	Rally	Driver	Co-Driver	Car
1	Molyslip Rally	Sarel van der Merwe	Franz Boshoff	Audi Quattro
2	Tour Natal	Geoff Mortimer	Brian Woodhead	Audi Quattro
3	Mr X-Haust Mr Tyre Rally	Sarel van der Merwe	Franz Boshoff	Audi Quattro
4	Datsun International	Sarel van der Merwe	Franz Boshoff	Audi Quattro
5	Castrol International Rally	Sarel van der Merwe	Franz Boshoff	Audi Quattro
6	Border Mountain Rally	Sarel van der Merwe	Franz Boshoff	Audi Quattro
7	Jurgens International Rally	Sarel van der Merwe	Franz Boshoff	Audi Quattro
8	Stannic International Rally	Geoff Mortimer	Brian Woodhead	Audi Quattro
9	AMSC Rally	Sarel van der Merwe	Franz Boshoff	Audi Quattro
	CHAMPIONS	Sarel van der Merwe	Franz Boshoff	Toyota

=== 1984 ===
Round	Rally	Driver	Co-Driver	Car
1	Tour de Valvoline	Sarel van der Merwe	Franz Boshoff	Audi Quattro
2	Nissan International Rally	Sarel van der Merwe	Franz Boshoff	Audi Quattro
3	Jurgens International Rally	Sarel van der Merwe	Franz Boshoff	Audi Quattro
4	Castrol International Rally	Sarel van der Merwe	Franz Boshoff	Audi Quattro
5	VW Algoa Rally	Geoff Mortimer	Brian Woodhead	Audi Quattro
6	Bosch Rally	Sarel van der Merwe	Franz Boshoff	Audi Quattro
7	Stannic International Rally	Harald Demuth	Stuart Pegg	Audi Quattro
8	Stannic Mountain Trial	Hannes Grobler	Piet Swanepoel	Nissan Langley
	CHAMPIONS	Sarel van der Merwe	Franz Boshoff	Nissan

=== 1985 ===
Round	Rally	Driver	Co-Driver	Car
1	Tour de Valvoline	Sarel van der Merwe	Franz Boshoff	Audi Quattro
2	Nissan International Rally	Serge Damseaux	Vito Bonafede	Ford Escort RS1700T
3	Wesbank International Rally	Sarel van der Merwe	Franz Boshoff	Audi Quattro
4	Castrol International Rally	Sarel van der Merwe	Franz Boshoff	Audi Quattro
5	VW Algoa Rally	Sarel van der Merwe	Franz Boshoff	Audi Quattro
6	Pretoria Brick 400 Rally	Sarel van der Merwe	Franz Boshoff	Audi Quattro
7	Stannic International Rally	Sarel van der Merwe	Franz Boshoff	Audi Quattro
8	Fleetlease Mountain Trial	Geoff Mortimer	Stuart Pegg	Audi Quattro
	CHAMPIONS	Sarel van der Merwe	Franz Boshoff	Volkswagen

=== 1986 ===
Round	Rally	Driver	Co-Driver	Car
1	Toyota Double 12 Rally	Geoff Mortimer	Brian Woodhead	Audi Quattro
2	Nissan International Rally	Kassie Coetzee	Wiley Harrington	Nissan Skyline
3	Wesbank International Rally	Eric Sanders	Richard Leeke	Toyota Corolla Liftback
4	Tour de Valvoline	Sarel van der Merwe	Franz Boshoff	Audi Quattro
5	Castrol International Rally	Sarel van der Merwe	Franz Boshoff	Audi Quattro
6	SAM 400 Rally	Sarel van der Merwe	Franz Boshoff	Audi Quattro
7	VW Algoa Rally	Geoff Mortimer	Brian Woodhead	Audi Quattro
8	Stannic Mountain Trial	Geoff Mortimer	Brian Woodhead	Audi Quattro
	CHAMPIONS	Hannes Grobler	Piet Swanepoel	Nissan

=== 1987 ===
Round	Rally	Driver	Co-Driver	Car
1	Tour de Valvoline	Geoff Mortimer	Franz Boshoff	Audi Quattro Sport S1 E2
2	Nissan International Rally	Serge Damseaux	Vito Bonafede	Toyota Corolla Turbo
3	Wesbank International Rally	Geoff Mortimer	Franz Boshoff	Audi Quattro Sport S1 E2
4	Castrol International Rally	Geoff Mortimer	Franz Boshoff	Audi Quattro Sport S1 E2
5	SAM 400 Rally	Serge Damseaux	Vito Bonafede	Toyota Corolla Turbo
6	VW Algoa Rally	Geoff Mortimer	Franz Boshoff	Audi Quattro Sport S1 E2
7	Stannic Mountain Trial	Geoff Mortimer	Franz Boshoff	Audi Quattro Sport S1 E2
8	Toyota Dealers Rally	Geoff Mortimer	Franz Boshoff	Audi Quattro Sport S1 E2
	CHAMPIONS	Geoff Mortimer	Franz Boshoff	Nissan

=== 1988 ===
Round	Rally	Driver	Co-Driver	Car
1	Tour de Valvoline	Serge Damseaux	Vito Bonafede	Toyota Corolla Turbo
2	Nissan International Rally	Sarel van der Merwe	Franz Boshoff	Audi Quattro Sport S1 E2
3	Wesbank International Rally	Sarel van der Merwe	Franz Boshoff	Audi Quattro Sport S1 E2
4	Castrol International Rally	Sarel van der Merwe	Franz Boshoff	Audi Quattro Sport S1 E2
5	Nissan 400 Rally	Serge Damseaux	Vito Bonafede	Toyota Corolla Turbo
6	VW Algoa Rally	Serge Damseaux	Vito Bonafede	Toyota Corolla Turbo
7	Stannic Mountain Trial	Sarel van der Merwe	Franz Boshoff	Audi Quattro Sport S1 E2
8	Toyota Dealers Rally	Hannes Grobler	Piet Swanepoel	Nissan Skyline Turbo
	CHAMPIONS	Sarel van der Merwe	Franz Boshoff	Volkswagen

=== 1989 ===
Round	Rally	Driver	Co-Driver	Car
1	Tour de Valvoline	Serge Damseaux	Vito Bonafede	Toyota Conquest 4x4
2	Nissan International Rally	Serge Damseaux	Vito Bonafede	Toyota Conquest RSi
3	Wesbank International Rally	Serge Damseaux	Vito Bonafede	Toyota Conquest 4x4
4	Castrol International Rally	Johan Everste	Steve Harding	Volkswagen Golf GTi
5	NGK 400 Rally	Serge Damseaux	Vito Bonafede	Toyota Conquest 4x4
6	VW Algoa Rally	Serge Damseaux	Vito Bonafede	Toyota Conquest 4x4
7	Stannic Mountain Trial	Serge Damseaux	Vito Bonafede	Toyota Conquest 4x4
8	Toyota Dealers Rally	Sarel van der Merwe	Franz Boshoff	Volkswagen Golf Syncro
	CHAMPIONS	Serge Damseaux	Vito Bonafede	Toyota

=== 1990 ===
Round	Rally	Driver	Co-Driver	Car
1	Tour de Valvoline	Jan Habig	Douglas Judd	Nissan Skyline
2	VW International Rally	Serge Damseaux	Vito Bonafede	Toyota Conquest 4x4
3	Castrol International Rally	Sarel van der Merwe	Franz Boshof	Volkswagen Golf Syncro
4	NGK 400 Rally	Glen Gibbons	Peter Cuffley	Toyota Conquest 4x4
5	VW Algoa Rally	Hannes Grobler	Piet Swanepoel	Nissan Sentra 4x4
6	Stannic Mountain Trial	Hannes Grobler	Piet Swanepoel	Nissan Sentra 4x4
7	Toyota Dealers Rally	Jan Habig	Douglas Judd	Nissan Sentra 4x4
8	Wesbank International Rally	Jan Habig	Douglas Judd	Nissan Sentra 4x4
	CHAMPIONS	Glyn Hall	Martin Botha	Toyota

=== 1991 ===
Round	Rally	Driver	Co-Driver	Car
1	Tour de Total	Glen Gibbons	Peter Cuffley	Toyota Conquest 4x4
2	VW International Rally	Serge Damseaux	Vito Bonafede	Toyota Conquest 4x4
3	Castrol International Rally	Serge Damseaux	Vito Bonafede	Toyota Conquest 4x4
4	NGK 400 Rally	Jan Habig	Douglas Judd	Nissan Sentra Coupe 4x4
5	VW Algoa Rally	Sarel van der Merwe	Franz Boshoff	Ford Laser 4x4
6	Stannic Mountain Trial	Sarel van der Merwe	Franz Boshoff	Ford Laser 4x4
7	Toyota Dealers Rally	Hannes Grobler	Douglas Judd	Nissan Sentra Coupe 4x4
8	Total International Rally	Sarel van der Merwe	Franz Boshoff	Ford Laser 4x4
	CHAMPIONS	Hannes Grobler	Douglas Judd	Nissan Sentra Coupe 4x4

=== 1992 ===
Round	Rally	Driver	Co-Driver	Car
1	Tour de Total	Nic de Waal	Guy Hodgson	Nissan Sentra Coupe 4x4
2	VW International Rally	Serge Damseaux	Vito Bonafede	Toyota Conquest 4x4
3	Castrol International Rally	Serge Damseaux	Vito Bonafede	Toyota Conquest 4x4
4	Sasol Rally	Sarel van der Merwe	Franz Boshoff	Ford Laser 4x4
5	VW Algoa Rally	Serge Damseaux	Vito Bonafede	Toyota Conquest 4x4
6	NGK Mountain Trial	Johan Everste	Peter Cuffley	Volkswagen Golf Syncro 4x4
7	NGK Swartland Rally	Hannes Grobler	Douglas Judd	Nissan Sentra Coupe 4x4
8	Total International Rally	Serge Damseaux	Vito Bonafede	Toyota Conquest 4x4
	CHAMPIONS	Serge Damseaux	Vito Bonafede	Volkswagen

=== 1993 ===
Round	Rally	Driver	Co-Driver	Car
1	Tour de Total	Serge Damseaux	Vito Bonafede	Toyota Conquest 4x4
2	CPMCC Rally	Serge Damseaux	Vito Bonafede	Toyota Conquest 4x4
3	Castrol International Rally	Jan Habig	Douglas Judd	Volkswagen Golf Syncro 4x4*
4	Sasol Rally	Sarel van der Merwe	Franz Boshoff	Ford Laser 4x4
5	VW Algoa Rally	Serge Damseaux	Vito Bonafede	Toyota Conquest 4x4
6	NGK Mountain Trial	Serge Damseaux	Vito Bonafede	Toyota Conquest 4x4
7	NGK Rally	Serge Damseaux	Vito Bonafede	Toyota Conquest 4x4
8	Total International Rally	Serge Damseaux	Vito Bonafede	Toyota Conquest 4x4
	CHAMPIONS	Serge Damseaux	Vito Bonafede	Volkswagen

- First South African crew home. Overall winners were Aldo Riva and Enrico Rivida in an Audi Quattro

Coupe.

=== 1994 ===
Round	Rally	Driver	Co-Driver	Car
1	Tour de Total	Serge Damseaux	Vito Bonafede	Toyota Conquest 4x4
2	WPMC Rally	Jan Habig	Douglas Judd	Volkswagen Golf Syncro 4x4
3	Castrol International Rally	Hannes Grobler	Martin Botha	Nissan Sentra 4x4
4	Sasol Rally	Enzo Kuun	Guy Hodgson	Ford Laser 4x4
5	VW Algoa Rally	Serge Damseaux	Vito Bonafede	Toyota Conquest 4x4
6	Mountain Trial	Hannes Grobler	Martin Botha	Nissan Sentra 4x4
7	CPMCC Rally	Serge Damseaux	Vito Bonafede	Toyota Conquest 4x4
8	PMC Rally	Serge Damseaux	Vito Bonafede	Toyota Conquest 4x4
	CHAMPIONS	Serge Damseaux	Vito Bonafede	Volkswagen

=== 1995 ===
Round	Rally	Driver	Co-Driver	Car
1	Tour de Total	Serge Damseaux	Vito Bonafede	Toyota Conquest 4x4
2	WPMC Rally	Serge Damseaux	Vito Bonafede	Toyota Conquest 4x4
3	Castrol International Rally	Serge Damseaux	Vito Bonafede	Toyota Conquest 4x4
4	Sasol Rally	Serge Damseaux	Vito Bonafede	Toyota Conquest 4x4
5	VW Algoa Rally	Serge Damseaux	Vito Bonafede	Toyota Conquest 4x4
6	Mountain Trial	Serge Damseaux	Vito Bonafede	Toyota Conquest 4x4
7	CPMCC Rally	Serge Damseaux	Vito Bonafede	Toyota Conquest 4x4
8	PMC Rally	Enzo Kuun	Johan Sieling	Hyundai Accent 4x4
	CHAMPIONS	Serge Damseaux	Vito Bonafede	Volkswagen

=== 1996 ===
Round	Rally	Driver	Co-Driver	Car
1	Tour Natal	Serge Damseaux	Vito Bonafede	Toyota Conquest 4x4
2	CCMCC Rally	Serge Damseaux	Vito Bonafede	Toyota Conquest 4x4
3	Castrol International Rally	Terry Brand	Martie Olivier	Volkswagen Golf*
4	Sasol Rally	Serge Damseaux	Vito Bonafede	Toyota Conquest 4x4
5	VW Rally	Serge Damseaux	Vito Bonafede	Toyota Conquest 4x4
6	Mountain Trial	Serge Damseaux	Vito Bonafede	Toyota Conquest 4x4
7	CPMCC Rally	Serge Damseaux	Vito Bonafede	Toyota Conquest 4x4
8	PMC Rally	Serge Damseaux	Vito Bonafede	Toyota Conquest 4x4
	CHAMPIONS	Serge Damseaux	Vito Bonafede	Volkswagen

- First South African qualifying crew home. Overall winners were Sarel van der Merwe / Franz Boshoff in a Daewoo Cielo

=== 1997 ===
Round	Rally	Driver	Co-Driver	Car
1	Tour Natal	Serge Damseaux	Vito Bonafede	Toyota Conquest
2	CCMCC Rally	Serge Damseaux	Vito Bonafede	Toyota Conquest
3	Toyota Dealers Rally	Sarel van der Merwe	Franz Boshoff	Daewoo Cielo
4	Sasol Rally	Enzo Kuun	Guy Hodgson	Daewoo Cielo
5	VW Rally	Sarel van der Merwe	Franz Boshoff	Daewoo Cielo
6	PMC Rally 1	Jan Habig	Douglas Judd	Volkswagen Golf
7	CPMCC Rally	Serge Damseaux	Vito Bonafede	Toyota Conquest
8	PMC Rally 2	Etienne Lourens	Robert Paisley	Toyota Conquest RSi*
	CHAMPIONS	Jan Habig	Douglas Judd	Volkswagen

- First South African crew home. Rally was won overall by Robbie Head / Franz Boshoff in a Daewoo Cielo.

=== 1998 ===
Round	Rally	Driver	Co-Driver	Car
1	Tour Natal	Serge Damseaux	Vito Bonafede	Toyota Conquest
2	CCMCC Rally	Serge Damseaux	Vito Bonafede	Toyota Conquest
3	Swaziland Rally	Jan Habig	Douglas Judd	Volkswagen Golf Kit Car
4	Sasol Rally	Serge Damseaux	Vito Bonafede	Toyota Conquest
5	VW Rally	Jan Habig	Douglas Judd	Volkswagen Golf Kit Car
6	Gauteng Rally	Paolo Piazza-Musso	Nic Hadden	Ford Escort Kit Car
7	CPMCC Rally	Enzo Kuun	Guy Hodgson	Daewoo Lanos
8	PMC Rally	Serge Damseaux	Vito Bonafede	Toyota Conquest
	CHAMPIONS	Serge Damseaux	Vito Bonafede	Toyota

=== 1999 ===
Round	Rally	Driver	Co-Driver	Car
1	Tour Natal	Serge Damseaux	Vito Bonafede	Toyota Conquest
2	CCMCC Rally	Jan Habig	Douglas Judd	Volkswagen Golf 4 Kit Car
3	Rally of South Africa	Serge Damseaux	Vito Bonafede	Toyota Conquest
4	Sasol Rally	Jan Habig	Douglas Judd	Volkswagen Golf 4 Kit Car
5	VW Rally	Jan Habig	Douglas Judd	Volkswagen Golf 4 Kit Car
6	Gauteng Rally	Jan Habig	Douglas Judd	Volkswagen Golf 4 Kit Car
7	CPMCC Rally	Jan Habig	Douglas Judd	Volkswagen Golf 4 Kit Car
8	Great North Rally	Jan Habig	Douglas Judd	Volkswagen Golf 4 Kit Car
	CHAMPIONS	Jan Habig	Douglas Judd	Toyota

=== 2000 ===
Round	Rally	Driver	Co-Driver	Car
1	Tour Natal	Jan Habig	Douglas Judd	Volkswagen Golf 4 Kit Car
2	Gauteng Rally	Jan Habig	Douglas Judd	Volkswagen Golf 4 Kit Car
3	Rally of South Africa	Serge Damseaux	Vito Bonafede	Toyota Corolla RSi
4	Sasol Rally	Serge Damseaux	Guy Hodgson	Toyota Corolla RSi
5	VW Rally	Serge Damseaux	Guy Hodgson	Toyota Corolla RSi
6	Mountain Trial	Jan Habig	Douglas Judd	Volkswagen Golf 4 Kit Car
7	Cape Rally	Jan Habig	Douglas Judd	Volkswagen Golf 4 Kit Car
8	Great North Rally	Jan Habig	Douglas Judd	Volkswagen Golf 4 Kit Car
	CHAMPIONS	Serge Damseaux	Douglas Judd	Toyota

=== 2001 ===
Round	Rally	Driver	Co-Driver	Car
1	Volkswagensure Tour Natal	Serge Damseaux	Guy Hodgson	Toyota Corolla
2	Total Rally of South Africa	Jan Habig	Douglas Judd	Volkswagen Golf
3	Toyota Dealers Rally	Jan Habig	Douglas Judd	Volkswagen Golf
4	Sasol Rally	Jan Habig	Douglas Judd	Volkswagen Golf
5	VW Rally	Serge Damseaux	Guy Hodgson	Toyota Corolla
6	Motorpics Mountain Trial	Jan Habig	Douglas Judd	Volkswagen Golf
7	Cape Rally	Johnny Gemmell	Gideon Trollip	Subaru Impreza WRX
8	Toyota Dealers Great North Rally	Johnny Gemmell	Gideon Trollip	Subaru Impreza WRX
	CHAMPIONS	Jan Habig	Douglas Judd	Toyota

=== 2002 ===
Round	Rally	Driver	Co-Driver	Car
1	Volkswagensure Tour Natal	Enzo Kuun	Pierre Arries	Volkswagen Golf
2	Cape Rally	Serge Damseaux	Guy Hodgson	Toyota Corolla
3	Total Rally of South Africa	Jan Habig	Douglas Judd	Volkswagen Golf
4	Sasol Rally	Enzo Kuun	Pierre Arries	Volkswagen Golf
5	VW Rally	Enzo Kuun	Pierre Arries	Volkswagen Golf
6	Motorpics Mountain Trial	Jan Habig	Douglas Judd	Volkswagen Golf
7	Cape Subaru Rally	Serge Damseaux	Robert Paisley	Toyota Corolla
8	Toyota Dealers Great North Rally	Etienne Lourens	Andre Vermuelen	Toyota Corolla
	CHAMPIONS	Jan Habig	Douglas Judd	Toyota

=== 2003 ===
Round	Rally	Driver	Co-Driver	Car
1	Hitachi Tour Natal	Jan Habig	Douglas Judd	Volkswagen Golf
2	Toyota Dealers Cape Rally	Serge Damseaux	Robert Paisley	Toyota RunX
3	Total Rally of South Africa	Serge Damseaux	Robert Paisley	Toyota RunX
4	Sasol Rally	Enzo Kuun	Guy Hodgson	Volkswagen Golf
5	VW Rally	Serge Damseaux	Robert Paisley	Toyota RunX
6	Motorpics Mountain Trial	Etienne Lourens	Andre Vermuelen	Toyota Corolla
7	Cape Subaru Rally	Serge Damseaux	Robert Paisley	Toyota RunX
8	Toyota Dealers Great North Rally	Enzo Kuun	Guy Hodgson	Volkswagen Golf
	CHAMPIONS	Serge Damseaux	Robert Paisley	Toyota

=== 2004 ===
Round	Rally	Driver	Co-Driver	Car
1	Hitachi Tour Natal	Serge Damseaux	Robert Paisley	Toyota RunX
2	Toyota Dealers Cape Rally	Serge Damseaux	Robert Paisley	Toyota RunX
3	Total Rally of South Africa	Serge Damseaux	Robert Paisley	Toyota RunX
4	Sasol Rally	Jan Habig	Douglas Judd	Volkswagen Golf
5	VW Rally	Serge Damseaux	Robert Paisley	Toyota RunX
6	Motorpics Mountain Trial	Enzo Kuun	Guy Hodgson	Volkswagen Golf
7	Cape Subaru Rally	Schalk Burger	Vito Bonafede	Subaru Impreza WRX
8	Toyota Dealers Great North Rally	Enzo Kuun	Guy Hodgson	Volkswagen Golf
	CHAMPIONS	Serge Damseaux	Robert Paisley	Toyota

=== 2005 ===
Round	Rally	Driver	Co-Driver	Car
1	Hitachi Tour Natal	Enzo Kuun	Guy Hodgson	Volkswagen Golf
2	Toyota Dealers Cape Rally	Serge Damseaux	Robert Paisley	Toyota RunX S2000
3	Total Rally of South Africa	Serge Damseaux	Robert Paisley	Toyota RunX S2000
4	Sasol Rally	Serge Damseaux	Robert Paisley	Toyota RunX S2000
5	VW Rally	Serge Damseaux	Robert Paisley	Toyota RunX S2000
6	Osram Mountain Trial	Enzo Kuun	Guy Hodgson	Volkswagen Polo S2000
7	Cape Subaru Rally	Jan Habig	Douglas Judd	Volkswagen Polo S2000
8	Toyota Dealers Great North Rally	Jan Habig	Douglas Judd	Volkswagen Polo S2000
	CHAMPIONS	Jan Habig	Douglas Judd	Toyota

=== 2006 ===
Round	Rally	Driver	Co-Driver	Car
1	Hitachi Tour Natal	Enzo Kuun	Guy Hodgson	Volkswagen Polo S2000
2	Toyota Dealers Cape Rally	Enzo Kuun	Guy Hodgson	Volkswagen Polo S2000
3	Sasol Rally	Jan Habig	Douglas Judd	Volkswagen Polo S2000
4	Zulu Rally of South Africa	Enzo Kuun	Guy Hodgson	Volkswagen Polo S2000
5	VW Rally	Jan Habig	Douglas Judd	Volkswagen Polo S2000
6	Osram Rally	Jan Habig	Douglas Judd	Volkswagen Polo S2000
7	Cape Subaru Rally	Serge Damseaux	Robert Paisley	Toyota RunX S2000
8	Toyota Dealers Great North Rally	Serge Damseaux	Robert Paisley	Toyota RunX S2000
	CHAMPIONS	Enzo Kuun	Guy Hodgson	Toyota

=== 2007 ===
Round	Rally	Driver	Co-Driver	Car
1	Toyota Dealers Rally	Serge Damseaux	Robert Paisley	Toyota RunX S2000
2	Sasol Rally	Johnny Gemmell	Peter Marsh	Toyota RunX S2000
3	Zulu Rally of South Africa	Hergen Fekken	Pierre Arries	Volkswagen Polo S2000
4	Total International Rally	Jan Habig	Douglas Judd	Volkswagen Polo S2000
5	VW Rally	Serge Damseaux	Robert Paisley	Toyota RunX S2000
6	Osram Rally	Hergen Fekken	Pierre Arries	Volkswagen Polo S2000
7	Cape Subaru Rally	Serge Damseaux	Robert Paisley	Toyota RunX S2000
8	Toyota Dealers Great North Rally	Johnny Gemmell	Peter Marsh	Toyota RunX S2000
	CHAMPIONS	Jan Habig	Douglas Judd	Toyota

=== 2008 ===
Round	Rally	Driver	Co-Driver	Car
1	Tour Natal Rally	Jan Habig	Douglas Judd	Volkswagen Polo S2000
2	Toyota Dealers Cape Rally	Hergen Fekken	Pierre Arries	Volkswagen Polo S2000
3	Sasol Rally	Enzo Kuun	Guy Hodgson	Volkswagen Polo S2000
4	Total International Rally	Hergen Fekken	Pierre Arries	Volkswagen Polo S2000
5	VW Rally	Mark Cronje	Robert Paisley	Toyota RunX S2000
6	Osram Rally	Hergen Fekken	Pierre Arries	Volkswagen Polo S2000
7	Swartland Rally	Jean-Pierre Damseaux	Cobus Very	Toyota RunX S2000
8	Toyota Dealers Great North Rally	Hergen Fekken	Pierre Arries	Volkswagen Polo S2000
	CHAMPIONS	Hergen Fekken	Pierre Arries	Toyota

=== 2009 ===
Round	Rally	Driver	Co-Driver	Car
1	Tour Natal Rally	Johnny Gemmell	Peter Marsh	Toyota Auris S2000
2	Toyota Dealers Cape Rally	Hergen Fekken	Pierre Arries	Volkswagen Polo S2000
3	Sasol Rally	Johnny Gemmell	Peter Marsh	Toyota Auris S2000
4	Total International Rally	Hergen Fekken	Pierre Arries	Volkswagen Polo S2000
5	VW Rally	Hergen Fekken	Pierre Arries	Volkswagen Polo S2000
6	Osram Rally	Johnny Gemmell	Peter Marsh	Toyota Auris S2000
7	BP Ultimate Swartland Rally	Mark Cronje	Robert Paisley	Toyota Auris S2000
8	Toyota Dealers Great North Rally	Enzo Kuun	Guy Hodgson	Volkswagen Polo S2000
	CHAMPIONS	Hergen Fekken	Pierre Arries	Toyota

=== 2010 ===
Round	Rally	Driver	Co-Driver	Car
1	Tour Natal Rally	Hergen Fekken	Pierre Arries	Volkswagen Polo S2000
2	Toyota Dealers Cape Rally	Conrad Rautenbach	Peter Marsh	Ford Fiesta S2000
3	Sasol Rally	Enzo Kuun	Guy Hodgson	Volkswagen Polo S2000
4	Rally of South Africa	Johnny Gemmell	Drew Sturrock	Toyota Auris S2000
5	VW Rally	Johnny Gemmell	Drew Sturrock	Toyota Auris S2000
6	Osram Rally	Enzo Kuun	Guy Hodgson	Volkswagen Polo S2000
7	Swartland Rally	Enzo Kuun	Guy Hodgson	Volkswagen Polo S2000
8	Toyota Dealers Great North Rally	Charl Wilken	Greg Godrich	Ford Fiesta S2000
	CHAMPIONS	Enzo Kuun	Guy Hodgson	Toyota

=== 2011 ===
Round	Rally	Driver	Co-Driver	Car
1	Tour Natal Rally	Conrad Rautenbach	Nicholas Klinger	Ford Fiesta S2000
2	Sasol Rally	Leeroy Poulter	Elvene Coetzee	Toyota Auris S2000
3	HMC Rally	Conrad Rautenbach	Nicholas Klinger	Ford Fiesta S2000
4	Toyota Gauteng Rally	Mark Cronje	Robin Houghton	Ford Fiesta S2000
5	VW Rally	Mark Cronje	Robin Houghton	Ford Fiesta S2000
6	George Rally	Mark Cronje	Robin Houghton	Ford Fiesta S2000
7	Toyota Dealer Rally	Conrad Rautenbach	Nicholas Klinger	Ford Fiesta S2000
8	Polokwane Rally	Leeroy Poulter	Elvene Coetzee	Toyota Auris S2000
	CHAMPIONS	Conrad Rautenbach	Robin Houghton	Toyota

=== 2012 ===
Round	Rally	Driver	Co-Driver	Car
1	Total Rally	Mark Cronje	Robin Houghton	Ford Fiesta S2000
2	Sasol Rally	Mark Cronje	Robin Houghton	Ford Fiesta S2000
3	Gauteng Rally	Jon Williams	Cobus Very	Ford Fiesta S2000
4	VW Rally	Johnny Gemmell	Carolyn Swan	Toyota Auris S2000
5	Rally of South Africa	Mark Cronje	Robin Houghton	Ford Fiesta S2000
6	Toyota Dealers Cape Rally	Johnny Gemmell	Carolyn Swan	Toyota Auris S2000
7	Polokwane Rally	Mark Cronje	Robin Houghton	Ford Fiesta S2000
8	Toyota Dealers Great North Rally	Hans Weijs Jr	Bjorn Degandt	Volkswagen Polo S2000
	CHAMPIONS	Mark Cronje	Robin Houghton	Ford

=== 2013 ===
Round	Rally	Driver	Co-Driver	Car
1	Total Rally	Mark Cronje	Robin Houghton	Ford Fiesta S2000
2	Sasol Rally	Mark Cronje	Robin Houghton	Ford Fiesta S2000
3	Gauteng Rally	Jan Habig	Robert Paisley	Ford Fiesta S2000
4	VW Rally	Mark Cronje	Robin Houghton	Ford Fiesta S2000
5	Ford Dealers Rally	Mark Cronje	Robin Houghton	Ford Fiesta S2000
6	Toyota Dealers Cape Rally	Mark Cronje	Robin Houghton	Ford Fiesta S2000
7	Polokwane Rally	Mark Cronje	Robin Houghton	Ford Fiesta S2000
8	Garden Route Rally	Mark Cronje	Robin Houghton	Ford Fiesta S2000
	CHAMPIONS	Mark Cronje	Robin Houghton	Toyota

=== 2014 ===
Round	Rally	Driver	Co-Driver	Car
1	Tour Natal Rally	Leeroy Poulter	Elvene Coetzee	Toyota Yaris S2000
2	Sasol Rally	Leeroy Poulter	Elvene Coetzee	Toyota Yaris S2000
3	Gauteng Rally	Mark Cronje	Robin Houghton	Ford Fiesta S2000
4	VW Rally	Mark Cronje	Robin Houghton	Ford Fiesta S2000
5	Toyota Cullinan Rally	Leeroy Poulter	Elvene Coetzee	Toyota Yaris S2000
6	Toyota Dealers Cape Rally	Giniel de Villiers	Greg Godrich	Toyota Yaris S2000
7	Polokwane Rally	Leeroy Poulter	Elvene Coetzee	Toyota Yaris S2000
8	Bela Bela Rally	Hans Weijs Jr	Bjorn Degandt	Volkswagen Polo S2000
	CHAMPIONS	Leeroy Poulter	Elvene Coetzee	Toyota

=== 2015 ===
Round	Rally	Driver	Co-Driver	Car
1	Tour Natal Rally	Mark Cronje	Robin Houghton	Ford Fiesta S2000
2	Sasol Rally	Mark Cronje	Robin Houghton	Ford Fiesta S2000
3	Secunda Rally	Mark Cronje	Robin Houghton	Ford Fiesta S2000
4	Bela Bela Rally	Leeroy Poulter	Elvene Coetzee	Toyota Yaris S2000
5	Volkswagen Rally	Leeroy Poulter	Elvene Coetzee	Toyota Yaris S2000
6	Toyota Tswane Rally	Leeroy Poulter	Elvene Coetzee	Toyota Yaris S2000
7	Toyota Dealer Cape Rally	Mark Cronje	Gerhard Snyman	Ford Fiesta S2000
8	Polokwane Rally	Mark Cronje	Gerhard Snyman	Ford Fiesta S2000
	CHAMPIONS	Mark Cronje	Elvene Coetzee	Toyota

=== 2016 ===
Round	Rally	Driver	Co-Driver	Car
1	Goldfields Rally	Leeroy Poulter	Elvene Coetzee	Toyota Yaris S2000
2	Sasol Rally	Leeroy Poulter	Elvene Coetzee	Toyota Yaris S2000
3	Secunda Rally	Leeroy Poulter	Elvene Coetzee	Toyota Yaris S2000
4	Volkswagen Rally	Leeroy Poulter	Elvene Coetzee	Toyota Yaris S2000
5	Heidelberg Rally	Leeroy Poulter	Elvene Coetzee	Toyota Yaris S2000
6	Toyota Dealer Cape Rally	Giniel de Villiers	Carolyn Swan	Toyota Yaris S2000
7	Hallspeed Rally	Luke Botha	Barry White	Ford Fiesta S2000
	CHAMPIONS	Leeroy Poulter	Elvene Coetzee	Toyota

=== 2017 ===
Round	Rally	Driver	Co-Driver	Car
1	Tour Natal Rally	Guy Botterill	Simon Vacy-Lyle	Toyota Etios R2
2	York Rally	Guy Botterill	Simon Vacy-Lyle	Toyota Etios R2
3	Secunda Rally	Chris Coertse	Greg Godrich	Mazda 2 R2 (1)
4	Volkswagen Rally	Richard Leeke Jnr	Henry Kohne	Ford Fiesta R2
5	HMC Electrothread Rally	Guy Botterill	Simon Vacy-Lyle	Toyota Etios R2
6	Caledon Rally	A.C. Potgieter	Nico Swartz	VW Polo R2 (2)
7	Carnival Rally	A.C. Potgieter	Nico Swartz	VW Polo R2 (3)
	CHAMPIONS	Guy Botterill	Simon Vacy-Lyle	Not Awarded

1 First R2 Class car home. Overall winners were Lee Rose / Elvene Coetzee in Classic Class Ford Escort

2 First R2 Class car home. Overall winners were Johnny Gemmell / Carl Peskin in Classic Class Porsche 911

3 First R2 Class car home. Overall winners were Theuns Joubert / Etienne Lourens in a S2000 Toyota Auris

=== 2018 ===
Round	Rally	Driver	Co-Driver	Car
1	Tour Natal Rally	Richard Leeke Jnr	Henry Kohne	Ford Fiesta R2
2	York Rally	Guy Botterill	Simon Vacy-Lyle	Toyota Etios R2
3	Rallystar Rally	Guy Botterill	Simon Vacy-Lyle	Toyota Etios R2
4	Algoa Rally	Guy Botterill	Simon Vacy-Lyle	Toyota Etios R2
5	HMC Electrothread Rally	Guy Botterill	Simon Vacy-Lyle	Toyota Etios R2
6	Lake Umuzi Rally	A.C. Potgieter	Nico Swartz	VW Polo R2
7	Ermelo Rally	Richard Leeke Jnr	Elvene Vonk	VW Polo R2
	CHAMPIONS	Guy Botterill	Simon Vacy-Lyle	Not Awarded

=== 2019 ===
Round	Rally	Driver	Co-Driver	Car
1	Overberg Grand Prix	Guy Botterill	Simon Vacy-Lyle	Toyota Etios R2
2	Rally of South Africa	Guy Botterill	Simon Vacy-Lyle	Toyota Etios R2
3	King Price Rally	Guy Botterill	Schalk van Heerden	Toyota Etios R2
4	Baywest Rally	A.C. Potgieter	Nico Swartz	VW Polo R2
5	Zane Rencken Rally	Guy Botterill	Simon Vacy-Lyle	Toyota Etios R2
6	TracN4 Rally	J.J. Potgieter	Tommy du Toit	VW Polo R2
	CHAMPIONS	Guy Botterill	Simon Vacy-Lyle	Not Awarded

2020

- Due to the COVID 19 Pandemic and the Disaster Management Legislation being implemented, the 2020 National Rally Championship had 3 events only.
- Each of the 2 days per event counted as an individual round.
- The National Rally Championship adapted this formula as it proved to be very effective. Competitors are now able to re-enter a new event the following day if they did not complete the 1st day of the event.

Round	Rally	Driver	Co-Driver	Car
1&2	Lake Umuzi Rally	Guy Botterill	Simon Vacy-Lyle	Toyota Etios Rally 2 kit
3&4	NTT Toyota Delmas Rally	Guy Botterill	Simon Vacy-Lyle	Toyota Etios Rally 2 kit
5&6	TRACN4 Rally	Guy Botterill	Simon Vacy-Lyle	Toyota Etios Rally 2 kit
	CHAMPIONS	Guy Botterill	Simon Vacy-Lyle	Not Awarded

2021

Round	Rally	Driver	Co-Driver	Car
1	NTT Toyota Delmas Rally	Chris Coertse	Greg Godrich	Huyndai i 20 Rally 2 Kit
2	NTT Toyota Delmas Rally	Chris Coertse	Greg Godrich	Huyndai i 20 Rally 2 Kit
3	Rallystar National Rally	Chris Coertse	Greg Godrich	Huyndai i 20 Rally 2 Kit
4	Rallystar National Rally	Theuns Joubert	Schalk Van Heerden	Toyota Auris S2000
5	Lake Umuzi Rally	Theuns Joubert	Schalk Van Heerden	Toyota Auris S2000
6	Lake Umuzi Rally	Guy Botterill	Simon Vacy-Lyle	Toyota Etios Rally 2 Kit
7	TRACN4 Rally of SA	Theuns Joubert	Schalk Van Heerden	Toyota Auris S2000
8	TRACN4 Rally of SA	Theuns Joubert	Schalk Van Heerden	Toyota Auris S2000
	2021 CHAMPIONS	Theuns Joubert	Schalk Van Heerden	Not Awarded

2021 - FIA African Rally Championship Round 7
Round	Rally	Driver	Co-Driver	Car
7	TRACN4 Rally of SA	Yasin Nasser	Ali Kathumba	Subaru Impreza

2022

Round	Rally	Driver	Co-Driver	Car
1	Cape Overberg Rally	Llewellyn Jones	Christophe Pichon	Subaru Impreza WRX STI
2	Cape Overberg Rally	Theuns Joubert	Schalk Van Heerden	Toyota Auris S2000
3 & 4	Lake Umuzi Rally	Guy Botterill	Somon Vacy-Lyle	Toyota Starlet AR 1
5	Algoa National Rally	Chris Coertse	Greg Godrich	Hyundai i20 Rally 2 Kit
6	Algoa National Rally	Theuns Joubert	Schalk Van Heerden	Toyota Auris S2000
7	NTT Tzaneen Rally	Guy Botterill	Simon Vacy-Lyle	Toyota Starlet AR 1
8	NTT Tzaneen Rally	JJ Potgieter	Tommie Du Toit	Hyundai i20 Rally 2 Kit
9	Delmas National Rally	Chris Coertse	Greg Godrich	Madzda 2 Rally 2 Kit
10	Delmas National Rally	Guy Botterill	Simon Vacy-Lyle	Toyota Starlet AR 1
11	TRACN4 National Rally	JJ Potgieter	Tommie Du Toit	Hyundai i20 Rally 2 Kit
12	TRACN4 National Rally	Chris Coertse	Greg Godrich	Mazda 2 Rally 2 Kit
	2022 CHAMPIONS	Chris Coertse	Greg Godrich	Not Awarded

2023

Round	Rally	Driver	Co-Driver	Car
1	Cape Overberg Rally (CANCELLED)	N/A	N/A	N/A
2	Cape Overberg Rally (CANCELLED)	N/A	N/A	N/A
3	Billy Te Water Memorial Rally - Secunda	J.J Potgieter	Tommy Du Toit	Hyundai i20 Rally 2 Kit
4	Billy Te Water Memorial Rally - Secunda	J.J Potgieter	Tommy Du Toit	Hyundai i20 Rally 2 Kit
5	Algoa Rally - Gqeberha	J.J Potgieter	Tommy Du Toit	Hyundai i20 Rally 2 Kit
6	Algoa Rally - Gqeberha	Jono Van Wyk	Nico Swartz	Toyota Starlet AR 1
7	Tzaneen Rally	J.J Potgieter	Tommy Du Toit	Hyundai i20 Rally 2 Kit
8	Tzaneen Rally	J.J Potgieter	Tommy Du Toit	Hyundai i20 Rally 2 Kit
9	Bronx Rally	J.J Potgieter	Tommy Du Toit	Hyundai i20 Rally 2 Kit
10	Bronx Rally	J.J Potgieter	Tommy Du Toit	Hyundai i20 Rally 2 Kit
11	TRAC Rally	Chris Coertse	Greg Godrich	Mazda 2
12	TRAC Rally	Chris Coertse	Greg Godrich	Mazda 2
	2023 CHAMPIONS	J.J Potgieter	Tommy Du Toit	Not Awarded

2024

Round	Rally	Driver	Co-Driver	Car
1	Swartland Rally	Chris Coertse	Carolyn Swan	Mazda 2 Rally 2 Kit
2	Swartland Rally	Chris Coertse	Carolyn Swan	Mazda 2 Rally 2 Kit
3	Secunda Rally	J.J Potgieter	Rikus Fourie	Hyundai i20 Rally 2 Kit
4	Secunda Rally	Benjamin Habig	Barry White	Volkswagen Polo 2000cc Turbo
5	Algoa Rally	Benjamin Habig	Barry White	Volkswagen Polo 2000cc Turbo
6	Algoa Rally	Chris Coertse	Matt Kohler	Mazda 2 Rally 2 Kit
*	Tzaneen Rally	Cancelled due to Bush Fires		
*	Tzaneen Rally	Cancelled due to Bush Fires		
7	TGRSA Ermelo Rally	Chris Coertse	Carolyn Swan	Mazda 2 Rally 2 Kit
8	TRAC Rally	Benjamin Habig	Barry White	Volkswagen Polo 2000cc Turbo
2024 Champions
	4 Wheel Drive	Chris Coertse	Carolyn Swan	Mazda 2 Rally 2 Kit
	2 Wheel Drive	Anton Raaths	Isabel Raaths	Toyota RunX 1600cc

== 2025 ==
Round	Rally	Driver	Co-Driver	Car
1	^{NTT Tzaneen Rally}	^{Benjamin Habig Jr}	^{Barry White}	^{VW Polo 2000cc Turbo 4 WD}
2	NTT Tzaneen Rally	Jono Van Wyk	Nico Swartz	Mazda 2 1600cc Turbo 4 WD
3	Algoa Rally	Jono Van Wyk	Nico Swartz	Mazda 2 1600cc Turbo 4 WD
4	Algoa Rally	Jono Van Wyk	Nico Swartz	Mazda 2 1600cc Turbo 4 WD
5	TGRSA Ermelo Rally	^{Benjamin Habig Jr}	^{Barry White}	^{VW Polo 2000cc Turbo 4 WD}
6	TGRSA Ermelo Rally	^{Benjamin Habig Jr}	^{Barry White}	^{VW Polo 2000cc Turbo 4 WD}
7 & 8	Fouriesburg Rally	Cancelled due to Heavy Rain		
9	TRACN4 Rally	Jono Van Wyk	Nico Swartz	Mazda 2 1600cc Turbo 4 WD
10	TRACN4 Rally	^{Benjamin Habig Jr}	^{Barry White}	^{VW Polo 2000cc Turbo 4 WD}

== 2026 ==
Round	Rally	Driver	Co-Driver	Car
1	North West Rally			
2	Cape Rally			
3	Cape Rally			
4	Algoa Rally			
5	Algoa Rally			
6	Ermelo Rally			
7	Fouriesburg Rally			
8	TRACN4 Rally			
