= Jan Hettema =

South African cyclist (1933–2016)

- Jan Hettema with a cycling trophy, circa 1950s

Personal information
- Born: 27 October 1933 Leeuwarden, Netherlands
- Died: 29 June 2016 (aged 82) Boschkop, Pretoria, South Africa

Cycling career
- Sport: Cycling

Jan Hettema (27 October 1933 – 29 June 2016) was a South African cyclist. He competed in three events at the 1956 Summer Olympics. He was also a successful rally driver and won the South African National Rally Championship five times. He was killed during an armed robbery at his smallholding in Tweedrag near Boschkop, Pretoria on 29 June 2016.
