= 2008 Pickup Truck Racing =

Seasons
- ← 2007 2009 →

Trucks queue in falling snow to take to the track for the first race of the 2008 season

The 2008 Pickup Truck Racing season was the 12th Pickup Truck Racing season. Gavin Seager took the Rockingham Championship on September 28 and then sealed the overall championship at Pembrey with a double race win, taking his tally for the season to 13 victories with two races remaining. Gavin became the first driver to win the overall championship three times.

== Race Calendar ==
Round	Circuit	Date	Winning driver
1	Brands Hatch Indy Circuit	March 23	Gavin Seager
2	Brands Hatch Indy Circuit	March 23	Gavin Seager
3	Rockingham Motor Speedway	April 20	Gavin Seager
4	Rockingham Motor Speedway	April 20	Gavin Seager
5	Rockingham Motor Speedway	May 26	Steve Dance
6	Rockingham Motor Speedway	May 26	Gavin Seager
7	Mondello Park	June 8	Gavin Seager
8	Mondello Park	June 8	Gavin Seager
9	Rockingham Motor Speedway	July 12/13	Gavin Seager
10	Rockingham Motor Speedway	July 12/13	Gavin Seager
11	Rockingham Motor Speedway	July 12/13	Gavin Seager
12	Donington Park	July 27	Chris Dawkins
13	Donington Park	July 27	Simon Carr
14	Thruxton	August 3	Gavin Seager
15	Thruxton	August 3	Gavin Seager
16	Brands Hatch	August 31	Steve Dance
17	Brands Hatch	August 31	Gavin Seager
18	Rockingham Motor Speedway	September 28	Gavin Seager
19	Rockingham Motor Speedway	September 28	Gavin Seager
20	Pembrey Circuit	October 12	Gavin Seager
21	Pembrey Circuit	October 12	Gavin Seager
22	Brands Hatch Indy Circuit	November 2	Gavin Seager
23	Brands Hatch Indy Circuit	November 2	Gavin Seager

== Additional Race ==
Following the rain-shortened race at Rockingham on 26 May (for which half points were awarded) an additional race was run on 12 July, making a three race weekend

== Championship Standings ==
Pos	No.	Driver	BRA		ROC		ROC		MON		ROC			DON		THR		BRA		ROC		PEM		BRA		Pts
Pos	No.	Driver	1	2	1	2	1	2	1	2	1	2	3	1	2	1	2	1	2	1	2	1	2	1	2	Pts
1	54	Gavin Seager	1	1	1	1	6	1	1	1	1	1	1	3	4	1	1	9	1	1	1	1	1	1	1	4410
2	15	Simon Carr	2	8	5	8	12	4	5	3	7	4	7	4	1	5	6	10	5	2	4	14	6	10	11	3908
3	4	Pete Stevens	10	3	14	9	7	12	10	4	5	5	2	6	5	6	4	4	3	6	7	6	5	16	2	3888
4	16	Steve Dance	3	Ret	6	6	1	15	4	6	2	2	3	2	3	3	2	1	4	3	2	2	Ret	2	3	3885
5	63	Phil White	9	4	4	5	2	8	7	5	6	Ret	5	5	6	4	7	15	9	9	8	10	3	7	5	3723
6	2	Dave Briggs	11	6	8	3	8	7	9	10	10	12	14	14	8	9	3	6	Ret	10	11	5	4	8	Ret	3360
7	9	Pete Wilkinson	13	2	9	10	10	9	3	Ret	Ret	10	Ret	13	2	2	10	2	6	8	5	9	2	9	6	3350
8	93	Michael Smith	5	7	10	12	9	11	14	Ret	Ret	9	11	7	Ret	8	8	3	7	4	6	11	9	11	16	3165
9	10	Chris Dawkins	7	11	11	11			6	DNS	13	6	9	1	7	7	9	13	2	Ret	DNS	8	13	6	7	2965
10	98	Antony Hawkins	12	13	7	7	11	10	11	Ret	12	13	8	8	Ret			11	13	7	12	4	8	14	4	2913
11	24	Richard Novell	14	16	12	14	14	13	Ret	9	11	11	12	Ret	14	14	14	Ret	16	12	9	13	10	15	13	2780
12	3	Julian Arnold	16	17	15	16	13	17	17	12	15	15	15	15	Ret	13	15	16	14	11	10	DNS	12	17	12	2740
13	22	Nic Grindrod	17	Ret	2	2	3	3	2	8	4	3	4	12	12					5	3			5	Ret	2418
14	26	Paul Saunders	4	9					Ret	2				12	9	11	5	7	8			7	11	4	15	2270
15	37	Neil Tressler			16	17	16	14			14	14	13	11	12	12	13	18	15	14	14	Ret	Ret	18	14	2213
16	14	Damien Carr	8	14					16	Ret				Ret	16	15	12	8	10	17	16	3	7	3	8	2170
17	8	Andy Pyke	15	10					15	7				9	10	10	11	17	Ret			12	Ret	12	19	1795
18	28	Richard Grindrod	6	5	3	4	3	3	8	8																1345
19	6	Rob Butterfield			17	15					8	Ret	10	10	13					13	Ret					1055
20	7	Tony Mumford	Ret	15	DNS	DNS	15	16	Ret	11	Ret	Ret	DNS	Ret	Ret	Ret	Ret	14	Ret	15	13	INJ	DNS			968
21	21	Kelly-Jayne Wells	18	Ret			5	6										5	11							723
22	69	Lee Rogers	Ret	12					12	Ret				Ret	DNS	Ret	DNS	Ret	Ret			Ret	DNS	13	10	355
23	5	John Mickel			17	15					Ret	8	6													600
24	74	Paul Poulter					17	5			3	7	Ret													470
25	46	Miguel Gomes																		16	15					255
26	18	John Stant									9	Ret	Ret													180
Pos	No.	Driver	1	2	1	2	1	2	1	2	1	2	3	1	2	1	2	1	2	1	2	1	2	1	2	Pts
Pos	No.	Driver	BRA		ROC		ROC		MON		ROC			DON		THR		BRA		ROC		PEM		BRA		Pts

Colour	Result
Gold	Winner
Silver	2nd place
Bronze	3rd place
Green	Finished
Blue	Not classified (NC)
Purple	Did not finish (Ret)
Red	Did not qualify (DNQ)
Black	Disqualified (DSQ)
White	Did not start (DNS)
Blank	Did not participate
Blank	Injured (INJ)
Blank	Excluded (EX)
