= 2007 Pickup Truck Racing =

Seasons
- ← 2006 2008 →

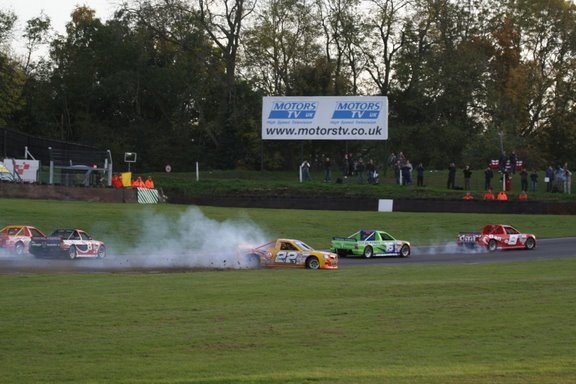
Grindrod's excursion in the final race ensured Steve Dance would take the championship

The 2007 Pickup Truck Racing season was the 11th Pickup Truck Racing season. It was won by Steve Dance with 3 race wins and 12 podiums. Going into the final race, Nic Grindrod was twenty points behind Steve Dance but with a second place for Dance and Grindrod finishing outside of the top ten, Dance secured the championship by 65 points. The Rookie trophy was won by Neil Tressler.

== Race Calendar ==
Round	Circuit	Date	Winning driver
1	Rockingham Motor Speedway	April 29	Paul Poulter
2	Rockingham Motor Speedway	April 29	Paul Poulter
3	Croft Circuit	May 20	Gavin Seager
4	Croft Circuit	May 20	Gavin Seager
5	Mondello Park	June 10	Peter Stevens
6	Mondello Park	June 10	Dave Briggs
7	Rockingham Motor Speedway	June 24	Paul Poulter
8	Rockingham Motor Speedway	June 24	Paul Poulter
9	Rockingham Motor Speedway	July 22	Paul Poulter
10	Rockingham Motor Speedway	July 22	Paul Poulter
11	Rockingham Motor Speedway	August 19	Gavin Seager
12	Rockingham Motor Speedway	August 19	Race not run
13	Brands Hatch Indy Circuit	September 2	Simon Carr
14	Brands Hatch Indy Circuit	September 2	Nic Grindrod
15	Rockingham Motor Speedway	September 16	Kelly-Jane Wells
16	Rockingham Motor Speedway	September 16	Steve Dance
17	Pembrey Circuit	October 21	Nic Grindrod
18	Pembrey Circuit	October 21	Steve Dance
19	Brands Hatch Indy Circuit	November 4	Steve Dance
20	Brands Hatch Indy Circuit	November 4	Gavin Seager

August 19 second race did not run due to unscheduled track activity extending beyond track curfew.

== Final Championship Standings ==
Pos	No.	Driver	ROC		CRO		MON		ROC		ROC		ROC		BRA		ROC		PEM		BRA		Pts
Pos	No.	Driver	1	2	1	2	1	2	1	2	1	2	1	2	1	2	1	2	1	2	1	2	Pts
1	16	Steve Dance	6	2	2	2	6	3	5	5	3	2	4		4	3	Ret	1	3	1	1	2	3575
2	22	Nic Grindrod	2	3	20	8	9	6	4	2	4	4	3		2	1	4	2	1	14	4	11	3510
3	54	Gavin Seager	3	4	1	1	4	5	2	11	2	5	1		5	16	2	4	Ret	8	2	1	3465
4	9	Pete Wilkinson	9	6	5	21	8	4	10	10	5	3	16		9	4	5	16	17	4	12	3	3210
5	4	Pete Stevens	13	11	7	4	1	7	14	Ret	16	16	6		12	2	12	10	4	7	5	4	3095
6	21	Kelly-Jayne Wells	8	5	11	3	Ret	11	7	Ret	10	6	15		11	10	1	3	9	6	11	5	2995
7	66	Martin Heath	18	7	6	13	3	8	11	6	9	12	12		Ret	12	7	15	10	12	7	Ret	2815
8	63	Phil White	Ret	16	13	7	11	13	18	8	14	9	Ret		13	7	3	5	6	3	18	6	2805
9	28	Richard Grindrod	Ret	Ret	9	10	Ret	6	3	4	8	7	5		10	11	Ret	9	2	2	3	16	2740
10	15	Simon Carr			8	5	5	10	9	13	6	Ret	8		1	Ret	6	7	8	5	6	8	2720
11	65	Mark Willis	4	Ret	3	6	2	2	6	3	7	8	13		7	5	10	6					2625
12	93	Michael Smith	10	8	14	16	10	16	16	9	15	13	10		8	6	17	Ret			8	10	2510
13	2	Dave Briggs	14	Ret	4	9	7	1	13	7	Ret	DNS	9		3	Ret	8	23	7	Ret	16	15	2380
14	37	Neil Tressler	17	14	17	20	16	15	21	16	18	19	Ret		20	15	20	20	12	16	19	13	2310
15	39	Karl Turner	7	10	19	15	15	12	8	12	12	11	7		18	Ret	19	12					2145
16	74	Paul Poulter	1	1			12	DNS	1	1	1	1	2		6	Ret	Ret	21			Ret	17	2115
17	98	Antony Hawkins	11	9	10	11			12	Ret	17	15	11		17	14	11	8	Ret	Ret	9	Ret	2080
18	26	Paul Saunders			18	19	13	14			19	17	Ret		14	9	15	19	11	15	Ret	9	1875
19	8	Andy Pyke			12	12	18	18			13	14			16	8	DNQ	DNQ	14	10	15	18	1620
20	69	Lee Rogers	NC	12	15	18	Ret	DNS			Ret	DNS			15	Ret	18	18	5	9	14	7	1435
21	3	Julian Arnold	15	DNS					20	15	Ret	20	Ret		DNS	17	Ret	17	13	13	17	14	1425
22	55	Tony Mumford	16	15	Ret	14	14	17			20	21	Ret		DNQ	DNQ	14	13	Ret	DNS	20	Ret	1420
23	29	Steve Pearce	12	13					Ret	14	Ret	18	14		21	18	16	22					1275
24	18	John Stant	Ret	Ret					17	Ret	11	10	Ret				9	11					925
25	14	Damien Carr													19	13			15	11	13	12	815
26	24	Richard Novell	5	Ret			Ret	DNS	Ret	Ret	Ret	DNS	DNS				13	14	16	Ret	Ret	DNS	650
27	73	Steve Dobbs	Ret	Ret	16	17	17	Ret	19	Ret	Ret	Ret	Ret										545
28	88	Graham France							15	17	Ret	Ret											270
29	10	Chris Dawkins																			10	Ret	165
30	44	Mike Doble																			Ret	Ret	20
31	6	Rob Butterfield															DNS	Ret					10
Pos	No.	Driver	1	2	1	2	1	2	1	2	1	2	1	2	1	2	1	2	1	2	1	2	Pts
Pos	No.	Driver	ROC		CRO		MON		ROC		ROC		ROC		BRA		ROC		PEM		BRA		Pts

Colour	Result
Gold	Winner
Silver	2nd place
Bronze	3rd place
Green	Finished
Blue	Not classified (NC)
Purple	Did not finish (Ret)
Red	Did not qualify (DNQ)
Black	Disqualified (DSQ)
White	Did not start (DNS)
Blank	Did not participate
Blank	Injured (INJ)
Blank	Excluded (EX)

== Rockingham Oval Championship ==
Pickup Truck Racing also includes a sub-championship for races held on the Rockingham oval circuit. The championship completed on 16 September as follows:

Position	Number	Driver	Points
1	22	Nic Grindrod	1855
2	54	Gavin Seager	1825
3	16	Steve Dance	1660
4	74	Paul Poulter	1655
5	9	Pete Wilkinson	1595
6	21	Kelly-Jane Wells	1525
7	65	Mark Willis	1515
8	66	Martin Heath	1510
9	39	Karl Turner	1505
10	98	Antony Hawkins	1330
11	4	Pete Stevens	1310
12	93	Michael Smith	1310
13	63	Phil White	1240
14	15	Simon Carr	1230
15	28	Richard Grindrod	1230
16	37	Neil Tressler	1075
17	29	Steve Pearce	1060
18	2	Dave Briggs	1030
19	18	John Stant	925
20	55	Tony Mumford	895
21	3	Julian Arnold	770
22	26	Paul Saunders	630
23	24	Richard Novell	495
24	69	Lee Rogers	395
25	88	Graham France	360
26	8	Andy Pyke	275
27	73	Steve Dobbs	170
28	6	Rob Butterfield	10
