= 2009 Pickup Truck Racing =

Seasons
- ← 2008 2010 →

The 2009 Pickup Truck Racing season was the 13th Pickup Truck Racing season.

== Race Calendar ==
Round	Circuit	Date	Winning driver	Fastest lap
1	Brands Hatch Indy Circuit	March 28/29	Michael Smith	Nic Grindrod
2	Brands Hatch Indy Circuit	March 28/29	Simon Carr	Pete Stevens
3	Rockingham Motor Speedway	April 18/19	Steve Dance	Antony Hawkins
4	Rockingham Motor Speedway	April 18/19	Gavin Seager	Pete Stevens
5	Silverstone	May 16/17	Simon Carr	Kelly-Jayne Wells
6	Silverstone	May 16/17	Mark Jones	Mark Jones
7	Rockingham Motor Speedway	May 30/31	Gavin Seager	Michael Smith
8	Rockingham Motor Speedway	May 30/31	Nic Grindrod	Gavin Seager
9	Oulton Park	June 20	Nic Grindrod	Gavin Seager
10	Oulton Park	June 20	Michael Smith	Antony Hawkins
11	Rockingham Motor Speedway	July 18/19	Nic Grindrod	Michael Smith
12	Rockingham Motor Speedway	July 18/19	Steve Dance	Gavin Seager
13	Donington	August 8/9	Nic Grindrod	Gavin Seager
14	Donington	August 8/9		Antony Hawkins
15	Thruxton	August 15/16		
16	Thruxton	August 15/16		
17	Rockingham Motor Speedway	September 5/6		
18	Rockingham Motor Speedway	September 5/6		
19	Pembrey Circuit	October 17/18		
20	Pembrey Circuit	October 17/18		
21	Brands Hatch Indy Circuit	Oct 31/Nov 1		
22	Brands Hatch Indy Circuit	Oct 31/Nov 1		

== Championship Standings ==
Pos	No.	Driver	BRA		ROC		SIL		ROC		OUL		ROC		DON		THR		ROC		PEM		BRA		Pts
Pos	No.	Driver	1	2	1	2	1	2	1	2	1	2	1	2	1	2	1	2	1	2	1	2	1	2	Pts
1	16	Steve Dance	2	2	1	3	3	7	4	2	3	4													1895
2	63	Phil White	3	4	2	7	5	12	3	5	5	6													1790
3	4	Pete Stevens	5	8	4	2	8	3	5	3	12	7													1765
4	93	Michael Smith	1	9	9	8	6	4	6	13	7	1													1730
5	15	Simon Carr	6	1	8	5	1	14	7	6	16	14													1660
6	54	Gavin Seager	4	3	6	1	13	2	1	4	11	Ret													1630
7	98	Antony Hawkins	8	10	7	6	10	10	10	7	14	5													1615
8	69	Lee Rogers	11	14	13	11	11	11	13	11	9	8													1490
9	2	Dave Briggs	9	15	Ret	14	2	5	8	12	4	11													1455
10	6	Rob Butterfield			10	9	12	15	9	8	10	12													1555
11	22	Nic Grindrod	7	6	3	Ret	Ret	DNS	2	1	1	Ret	1												1160
12	3	Julian Arnold	17	17	11	10			12	10	13	13													1125
13	79	Mark Jones	14	11			4	1			2	3													1050
14	21	Kelly-Jayne Wells	16	5	5	4	4	8																	1005
15	26	Paul Saunders	19	7			14	6			6	2													960
16	14	Damien Carr	10	19			9	13			Ret	9													725
17	43	Greg Wood	12	13			Ret	9			8	Ret													630
18	51	John Mickel			15	12			11	9															585
19	37	Neil Tressler			14	13			15	14															540
20	41	Carl Broadley			Ret	15			14	15															405
21	15	Mike Doble	15	16							DNS	10													310
22	7	Tony Mumford	18	Ret	12	Ret					Ret	DNS													290
23	10	Chris Dawkins	13	12																					285
24	81	Matt Annible									15	15													260
25	31	Stuart Annible	Ret	18																					125
Pos	No.	Driver	1	2	1	2	1	2	1	2	1	2	1	2	1	2	1	2	1	2	1	2	1	2	Pts
Pos	No.	Driver	BRA		ROC		SIL		ROC		OUL		ROC		DON		THR		ROC		PEM		BRA		Pts

Colour	Result
Gold	Winner
Silver	2nd place
Bronze	3rd place
Green	Finished
Blue	Not classified (NC)
Purple	Did not finish (Ret)
Red	Did not qualify (DNQ)
Black	Disqualified (DSQ)
White	Did not start (DNS)
Blank	Did not participate
Blank	Injured (INJ)
Blank	Excluded (EX)
