= ASCAR Racing Series =

Stock car racing series

- VSR V8 Trophy (Series final logo)
- Category: Stock cars
- Country: United Kingdom (2001–2008); Germany (2001–2003); France (2008)
- Inaugural season: 2001
- Folded: 2008
- Constructors: Chevrolet; Ford; Pontiac
- Tyre suppliers: Goodyear; Hoosier; Avon Tyres
- Last Drivers' champion: Colin White (2007)
- Last Teams' champion: CWS Racing Chevrolet (2007)

ASCAR (Anglo-American Stock Car Racing), was a stock car racing series that raced at circuits around the United Kingdom and Europe from 2001 until 2008. The series went through many guises during its seven year period and was known as the ASCAR Mintex Cup from 2001 to 2003, later known as the Days of Thunder Racing Series (2004) and the SCSA (Stock Car Speed Association) (2005 to 2007) before its final season as the SCSA MAC Tools VSR V8 Trophy. Although going through these varying identities the series was commonly referred to and known by its original name of ASCAR. The series predominantly raced the oval tracks at the Rockingham Motor Speedway and the EuroSpeedway Lausitz in the early years but in its final season in 2008 was solely road racing series that would visit various tracks in the UK most notably Brands Hatch and in France at Croix en Ternois. The series folded in 2008 and merged into part of the European Late Model Series in 2009, racing in Belgium and the UK.

Constructor cars consisted of NASCAR style Chevrolet, Ford and Pontiac racers with a field that peaked at 37 drivers competing during the 2002 season. John Mickel was the first ever champion with a different driver winning the title over all six-seasons, with Team West-Tec, RML and Torquespeed each winning two drivers championships each. Colin White and John Steward were the only drivers who raced in every season, whilst various drivers from a range of different styles of motorsport competed either single races or single seasons, most notably Colin McRae, Aaron Slight, Jason Plato, Max Papis, and the 2002 champion Nicolas Minassian.

== History ==
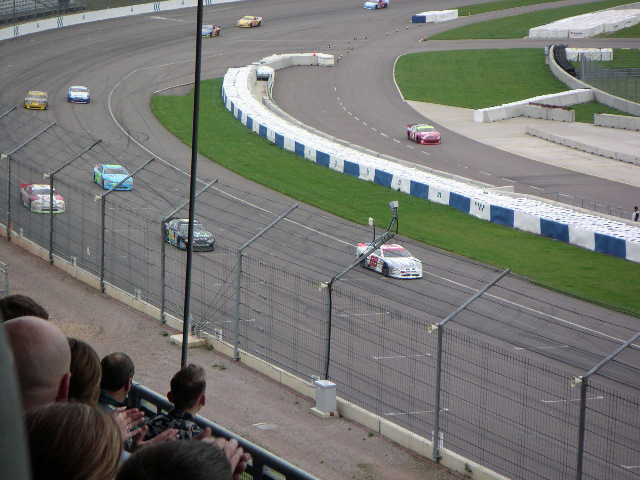
An ASCAR race at Rockingham during the 2004 season.

The ASCAR Mintex Cup made its debut in 2001 with the first ever race being held at the Rockingham Motor Speedway on 26 May, the race was won by former two-time BTCC champion John Cleland for his Chevrolet-powered Cleland Speedsport team. The event that took part in front of 12,000 fans saw Cleland qualify on pole, however he had to fight back to win the race which had seen six-different race leaders Further rounds at Rockingham, Knockhill Racing Circuit in Scotland, EuroSpeedway Lausitz in Germany and Mondello Park in Ireland were cancelled due to a fuel pickup issue, so Round 2 didn't hit the calendar until 26 August back at Rockingham. The initial season saw 14 teams fielding 21 cars with the season eventually being won by John Mickel of Torquespeed, by beating Dutchman Michael Vergers in the final race by 0.2 seconds, winning the title despite only two wins to Vergers three. Following his championship win, Mickel stated "I owe it all to my crew. We've grown up around the short ovals together and most of them have been with me since I was 10, they didn't let me down. They won it for me."

The 2002 season saw the peak number of drivers racing in the series with 37 taking part during the year, representing a total of 13 teams. Each race event would partner the BRSCC Pickup Truck Racing, with the series being split between six-events at Rockingham, and two in Lausitz consisting of a total of 20 rounds. The season saw its first American competitors compete as NASCAR drivers Randy Tolsma and Brandon Whitt both drove the no.48 Deuce Racing car, whereas Colin McRae, Darren Manning, Matt Neal and Jason Plato all joined XCEL Motorsport. Darren Turner registered six-wins during the season but having missed the opening five-rounds he would only place 7th in the Championship with the title going to French driver Nicolas Minassian of RML Group who only won the one race back in Round 2.

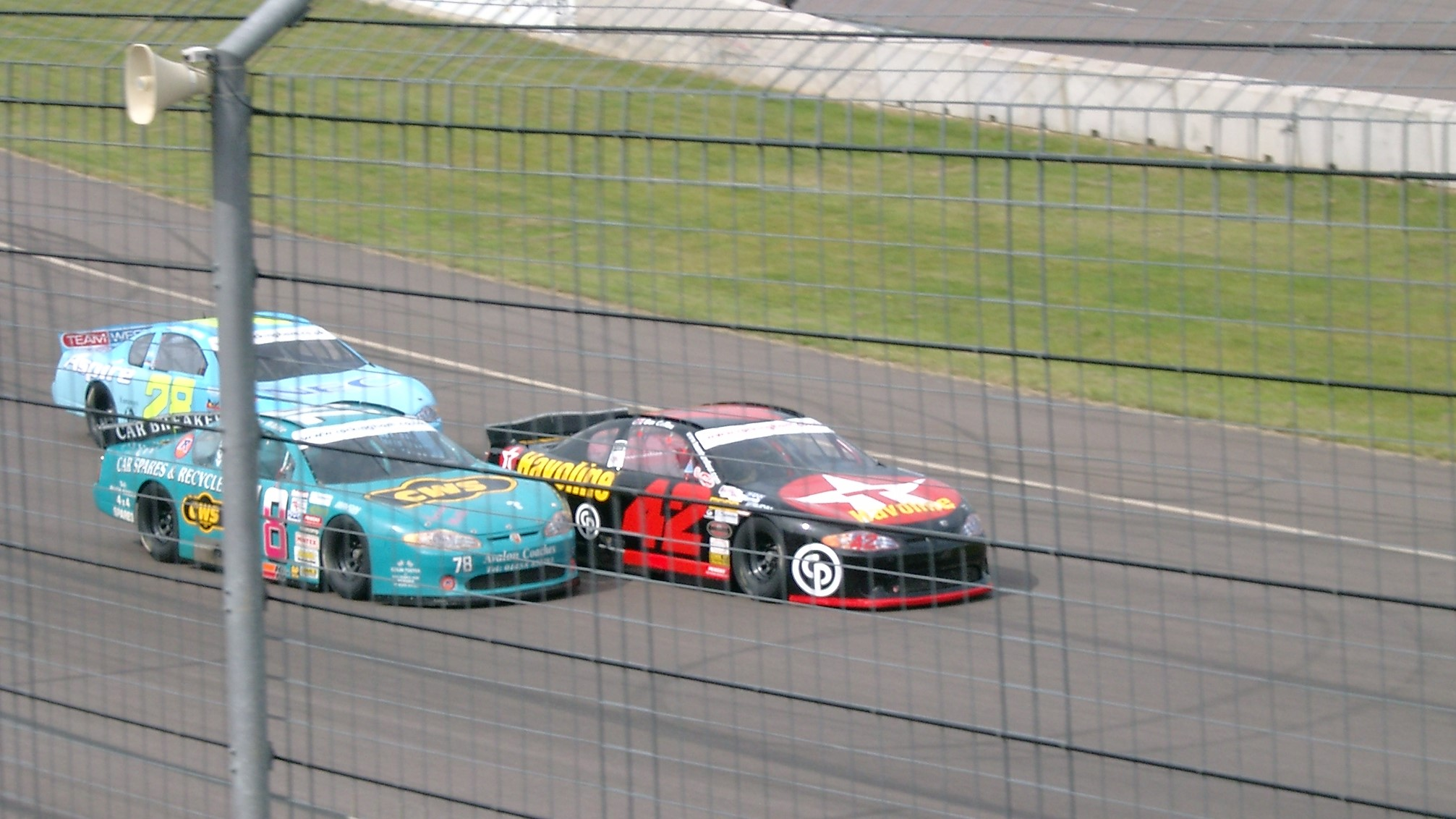
The start of a race at Rockingham during the 2004 season.

In 2003 the series took on the additional name of "Days of Thunder" after the film of the same name, the season was reduced to 13 rounds spanning over 8 events at both Rockingham and Lausitz. Minassian's replacement at RML, Ben Collins took six race victories, all coming in the final eight rounds of the season. In 2004 the ASCAR label was dropped completely and the series was labelled as the "Days of Thunder Racing Series", the series also dropped the Germany races due to the costs involved and the projected grid numbers of cars willing to make the journey. The season which now ran exclusively from Rockingham was won by Stevie Hodgson of TorqueSpeed.

2005 saw the series renamed once again "Stock Car Speed Association" (SCSA) after a link-up with the American Speed Association and incorporated the Pickup Truck Racing Series under the same banner. Michael Vergers who had been with the series since the inaugural season took the title for Team West-Tec winning three of the twelves rounds which once more were all held at Rockingham. In 2006 the SCSA and Pickup Truck Racing ran at Rockingham as part of the "Thunder Sundays" package organised by the BRSCC. The series continued to field only the twelve rounds and the participating number of drivers was moved down to 18. Oli Playle took the title with a dominating season scoring eight race wins.

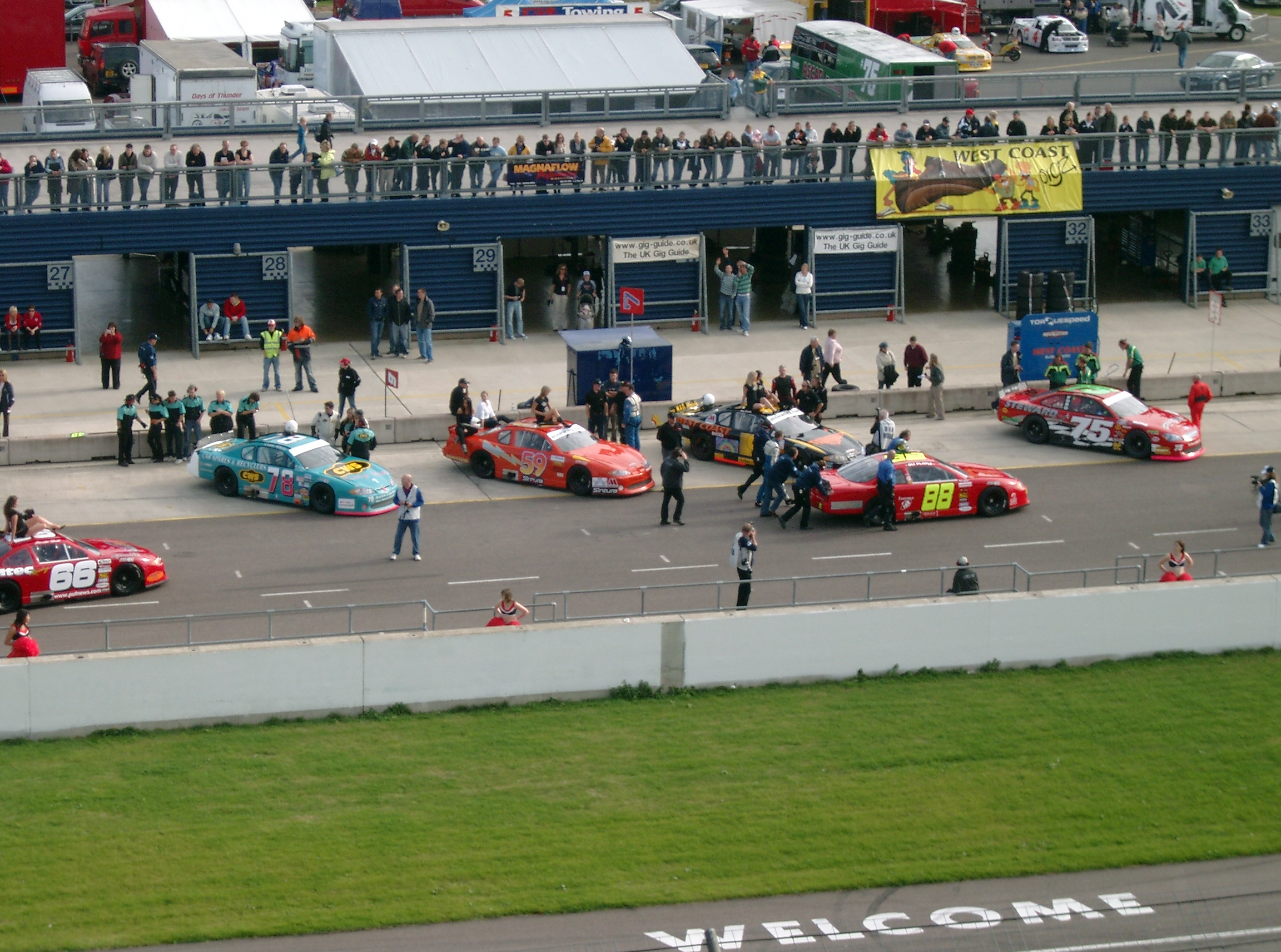
SCSA cars line up on pit road for the season finale of the 2006 season.

The SCSA name remained for 2007; as part of a new sponsorship deal competitors competed for the 'SCSA MAC Tools V8 Trophy'. On Wednesday 5 September, British motorsport publication Motorsport News reported that the SCSA would come to an end after the final race of this season. However, the teams, and the organisers of the Mac Tools V8 Trophy vowed to continue in 2008, whether as a MSA Sanctioned championship, or just as a "series". The final recognised oval racing season was won by Colin White, with the field reduced once more to seven rounds, competed by only 15 drivers. 2008 heralded a new direction for the series with a focus on road courses due to a lack of dates offered by the oval tracks. The cars ran as part of the VSR Series, with the stock cars known as the VSR V8 Trophy. In 2009 the series joined with CAMSO V8 to form the new European Late Model Series.

Period	Sponsor	Brand
2001–2002	Mintex	ASCAR Mintex Cup
2003	No Sponsor	ASCAR Days of Thunder Series
2004	No Sponsor	Days of Thunder Racing Series
2004–2006	No Sponsor	SCSA (Stock Car Speed Association)
2007	Mac Tools	SCSA Mac Tools V8 Trophy
2008	Mac Tools	Mac Tools VSR V8 Trophy

== Race days ==
In 2003 the series took on the additional name of "Days of Thunder" after the film of the same name. This was done as a marketing tool as starting in this year they promoted the series as a day out for all the family and had appearances from bands such as Busted and The Darkness.

== Teams and Cars ==
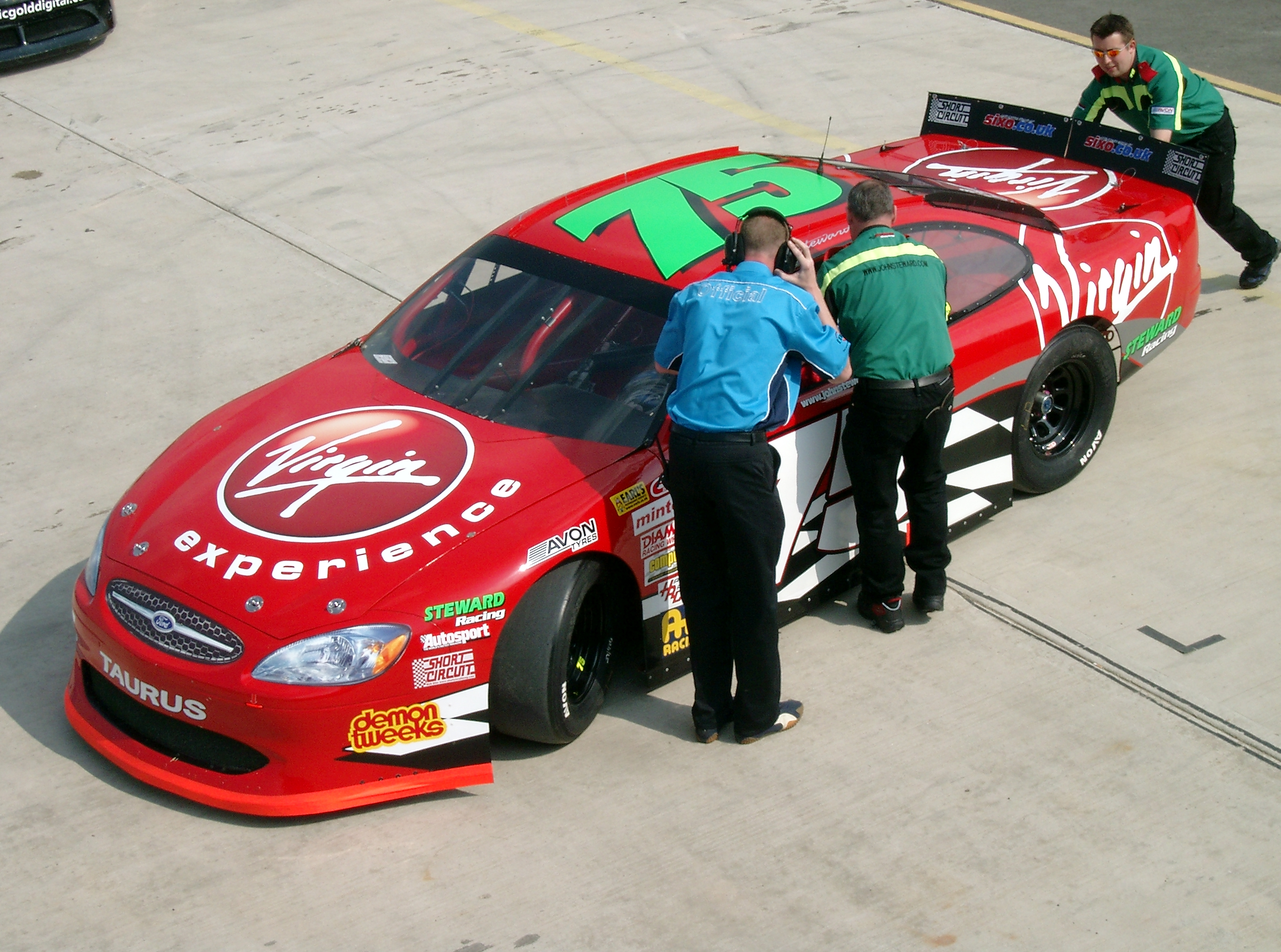
A Ford Taurus driven by John Steward in 2004.

ASCAR fielded the latest NASCAR Generation 4 variant race machines at the time, a combined field of 5.7 litre V8s tuned to 470 bhp & sporting Ford Taurus, Chevrolet Monte Carlo or Pontiac Grand Prix body shells.

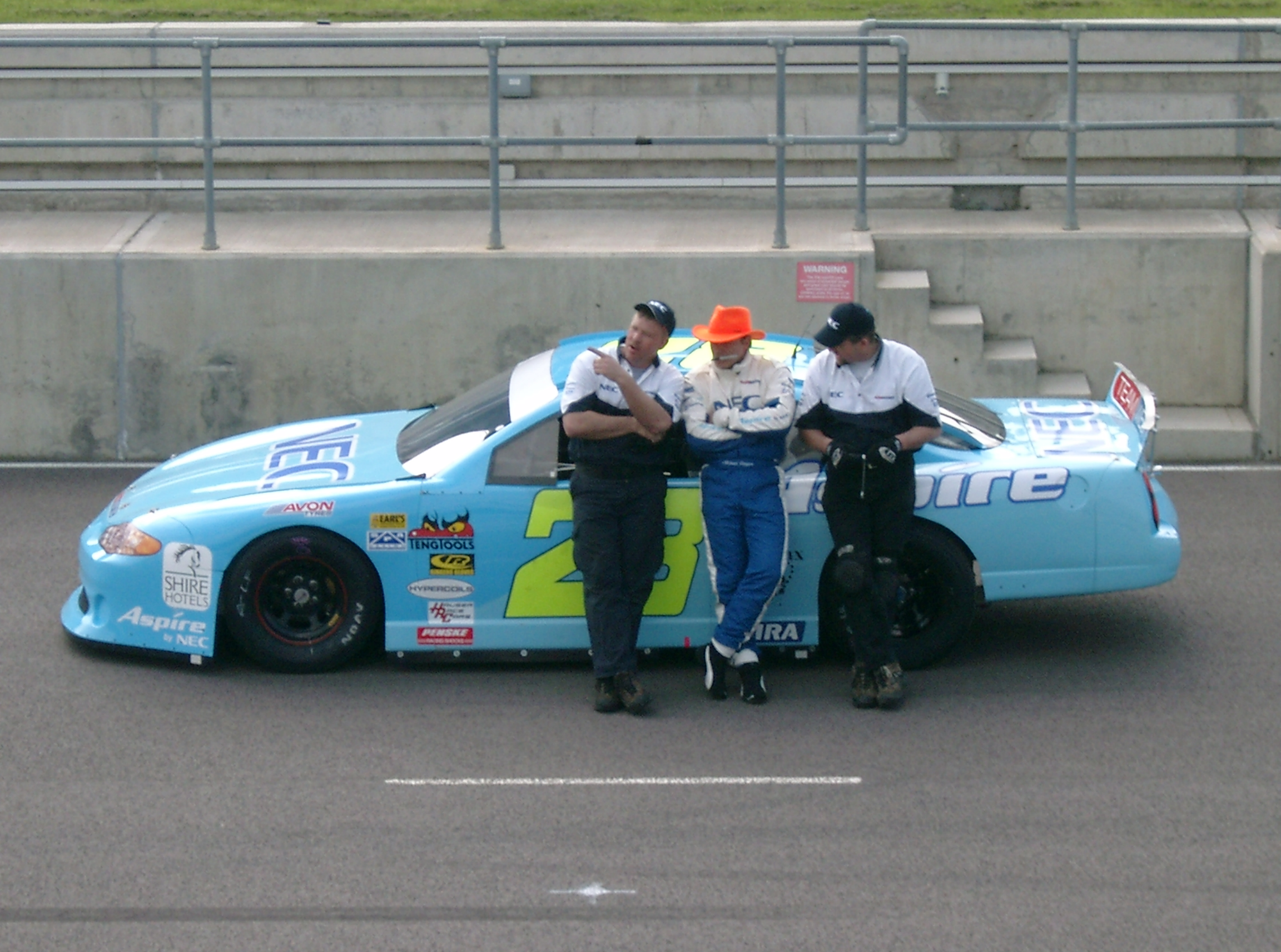
Team West-Tec are the most successful team in the series, winning 2 titles like TorqueSpeed and RML, they won more races than any other team with 21.

Team	Constructor	Seasons	Championship Wins	Race Wins
Team West-Tec	Chevrolet (2001–2004); Ford (2001–2003); Pontiac (2003–2006)	2001–2006	2	21
Colin Blower Motorsport	Chevrolet	2001–2002	0	0
Team Catchpole Racing	Chevrolet	2001–2006	0	0
Cleland SpeedSport	Chevrolet	2001	0	1
Oughtred & Harrison	Ford	2001	0	0
Shear-Speed	Pontiac	2001–2003	0	0
Streber Motorsport	Pontiac	2001	0	0
TorqueSpeed	Chevrolet (2001–2005); Ford (2004–2005)	2001–2005	2	17
Dudman Motorsport	Chevrolet	2001	0	0
Lee Caroline Racing	Ford	2001	0	0
Steward Racing	Chevrolet (2001); Ford (2002–2007)	2001–2007	0	1
CWS Racing	Chevrolet (2001–2007); Pontiac (2005)	2001–2007	1	15
Michael Smith Racing	Chevrolet	2001	0	0
TJ Motorsport	Ford	2001	0	0
Hodgson Motorsport	Chevrolet; Pontiac	2002	0	2
RML Group	Chevrolet	2002–2003	2	10
Fast-Tec Motorsport	Ford (2002); Pontiac (2003–2005)	2002–2005	0	0
Deuce Racing	Chevrolet	2002	0	0
Xcel Motorsport	Ford (2002); Pontiac (2003)	2002–2003	0	1
Team HTML	Pontiac	2002–2004	0	7
Kidd-Richardson Racing	Chevrolet	2003–2005	0	0
Shark Racing	Chevrolet	2003	0	0
Intersport Racing	Pontiac	2003–2004	0	0
Team Turn-Four	Chevrolet; Ford	2004	0	1
24-7 Motorsport	Chevrolet	2004–2005	0	0
Renegade Racing	Chevrolet	2004	0	0
Kraco Racing	Chevrolet	2005	0	0
MyOwnRaceTeam	Pontiac	2005	0	0
Team For Trucks	Ford (2005); Pontiac (2005–2007)	2005–2007	0	0
Revolution Racing	Chevrolet	2006–2007	0	1
Team Networking	Chevrolet	2006–2007	0	0
M-Tec	Chevrolet	2006	0	0
Team Ranger Racing	Chevrolet	2007	0	0
CB Racing	Chevrolet	2007	0	0
Team Air Ambulance	Pontiac	2007	0	0
KLANN Racing	Chevrolet	2007	0	0

== Drivers ==
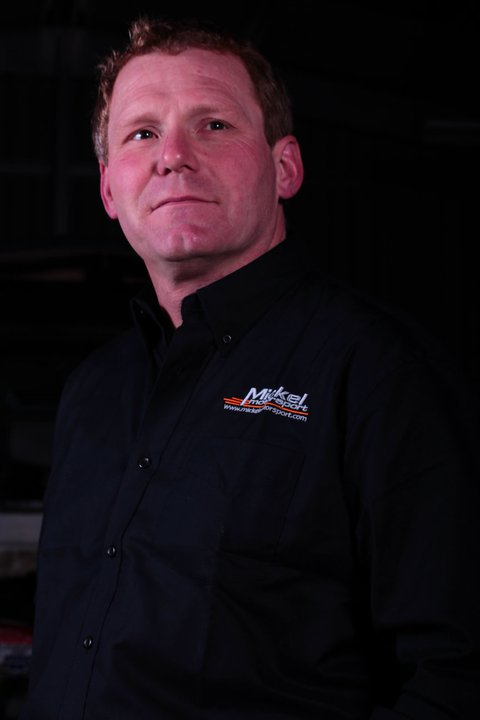
John Mickel, the first ASCAR champion from the 2001 season.

The inaugural championship in 2001 was won by future NASCAR driver John Mickel racing for Torquespeed. In 2002 French driver Nicolas Minassian of RML Group arrived from CART and took the title. Further Champions were Ben Collins in 2003, who also worked as The Stig on Top Gear during his ASCAR tenure, Stevie Hodgson, Michael Vergers, Oli Playle and Colin White.

Although most of the field often included a field of British professional and semi-professional stock car drivers, a number of well-known racing drivers from across a wide variety of series competed, often racing either single races or for one full season. They included former WRC champion Colin McRae, ex Formula 1 drivers Max Papis and Kelvin Burt, former IndyCar series driver Darren Manning, former World Superbike Championship rider Aaron Slight, American Nascar drivers Randy Tolsma, Brandon Whitt and Steve Grissom also took part, as did former BTCC champions Jason Plato, Matt Neal and John Cleland. Aside from Ben Collins, future Top Gear presenter Chris Harris took part in the 2004 season, and fellow motoring journalists Tiff Needell and Amanda Stretton raced in the debut 2001 season. Toby Scheckter the son of 1979 F1 champion Jody competed in the 2002 season.

=== Notable Drivers ===
Season	Driver	Team(s)
2001	(United Kingdom) Amanda Stretton	Team West-Tec
2001–2004	(United Kingdom) Rob Speak	Team West-Tec, Colin Blower Motorsport, Team Turn Four
2001	(United Kingdom) John Cleland	Cleland SpeedSport
2001	(United Kingdom) Tiff Needell	Colin Blower Motorsport
2001–2005	(United Kingdom) Mark Proctor	Oughtred & Harrison, Fast Tec Motorsport
2001–2005	(United Kingdom) John Mickel	TorqueSpeed
2001–2007	(United Kingdom) Colin White	CWS Racing
2001	(New Zealand) Aaron Slight	TJ Motorsport
2002	(United Kingdom) Kevin McGarrity	Hodgson Motorsport
2002	(United Kingdom) Kelvin Burt	RML Group
2002	(France) Nicolas Minassian	RML Group
2002–2004	(United Kingdom) Ben Collins	Fast Tec Motorsport, RML Group, Team Turn Four
2002	(United Kingdom) Paula Cook	Fast Tec Motorsport
2002	(United States) Randy Tolsma	Deuce Racing
2002	(United States) Brandon Whitt	Deuce Racing
2002	(South Africa) Toby Scheckter	Deuce Racing
2002–2003	(United Kingdom) Derek Hayes	Deuce Racing, Team West-Tec, Team HTML
2002	(United Kingdom) Colin McRae	Xcel Motorsport
2002	(United Kingdom) Darren Manning	Xcel Motorsport
2002	(United Kingdom) Matt Neal	Xcel Motorsport
2002	(United Kingdom) Jason Plato	Xcel Motorsport
2002	(United Kingdom) Darren Turner	Team HTML
2003	(United States) Steve Grissom	RML Group
2003–	(United Kingdom) Andrew Kirkaldy	Xcel Motorsport
2003	(Republic of Ireland) Kieran Dynes	Scott Racing Services
2003	(Italy) Max Papis	Team HTML
2004, 2006	(United Kingdom) Steve Dance	TorqueSpeed, Team Catchpole Racing
2004	(United Kingdom) Chris Harris	TorqueSpeed
2005	(United Kingdom) Gavin Seager	Kidd Richardson Racing
2005–2006	(United Kingdom) Hunter Abbott	TorqueSpeed, Steward Racing
2006–2007	(United Kingdom) Pete Wilkinson	Team Ranger Racing
2006	(United Kingdom) Paul Poulter	Steward Racing
2007–2008	(United Kingdom) Carl Boardley	CB Racing

=== Nationalities ===
The nationalities of every driver who participated in an ASCAR race from 2001 to 2007.

Country	Drivers
United Kingdom	70
United States of America	4
Australia; France; Republic of Ireland	2
Colombia; Germany; India; Italy; Netherlands; New Zealand; South Africa; Sweden	1

== Champions ==
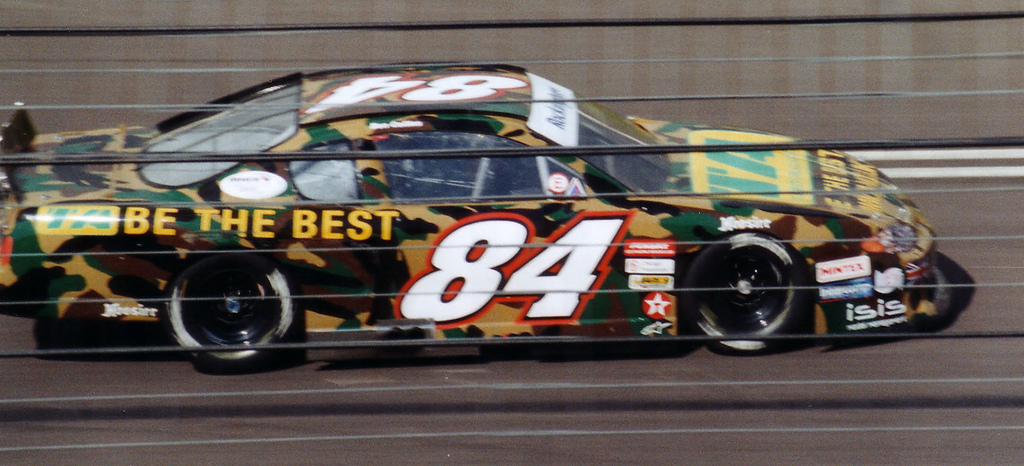
Ben Collins on his way to winning the 2003 ASCAR championship

Year	#	Driver	Points	Team	Constructor	Wins in Season
2007	78	(United Kingdom) Colin White	1940	CWS Racing	Chevrolet	5
2006	88	(United Kingdom) Oli Playle	1985	Team West-Tec	Pontiac	8
2005	28	(Netherlands) Michael Vergers	2245	Team West-Tec	Pontiac	3
2004	24	(United Kingdom) Stevie Hodgson	2010	TorqueSpeed	Chevrolet	2
2003	84	(United Kingdom) Ben Collins	2299	RML	Chevrolet	6
2002	8	(France) Nicolas Minassian	2535	RML	Chevrolet	1
2001	24	(United Kingdom) John Mickel	860	TorqueSpeed	Chevrolet	2

== Tracks ==
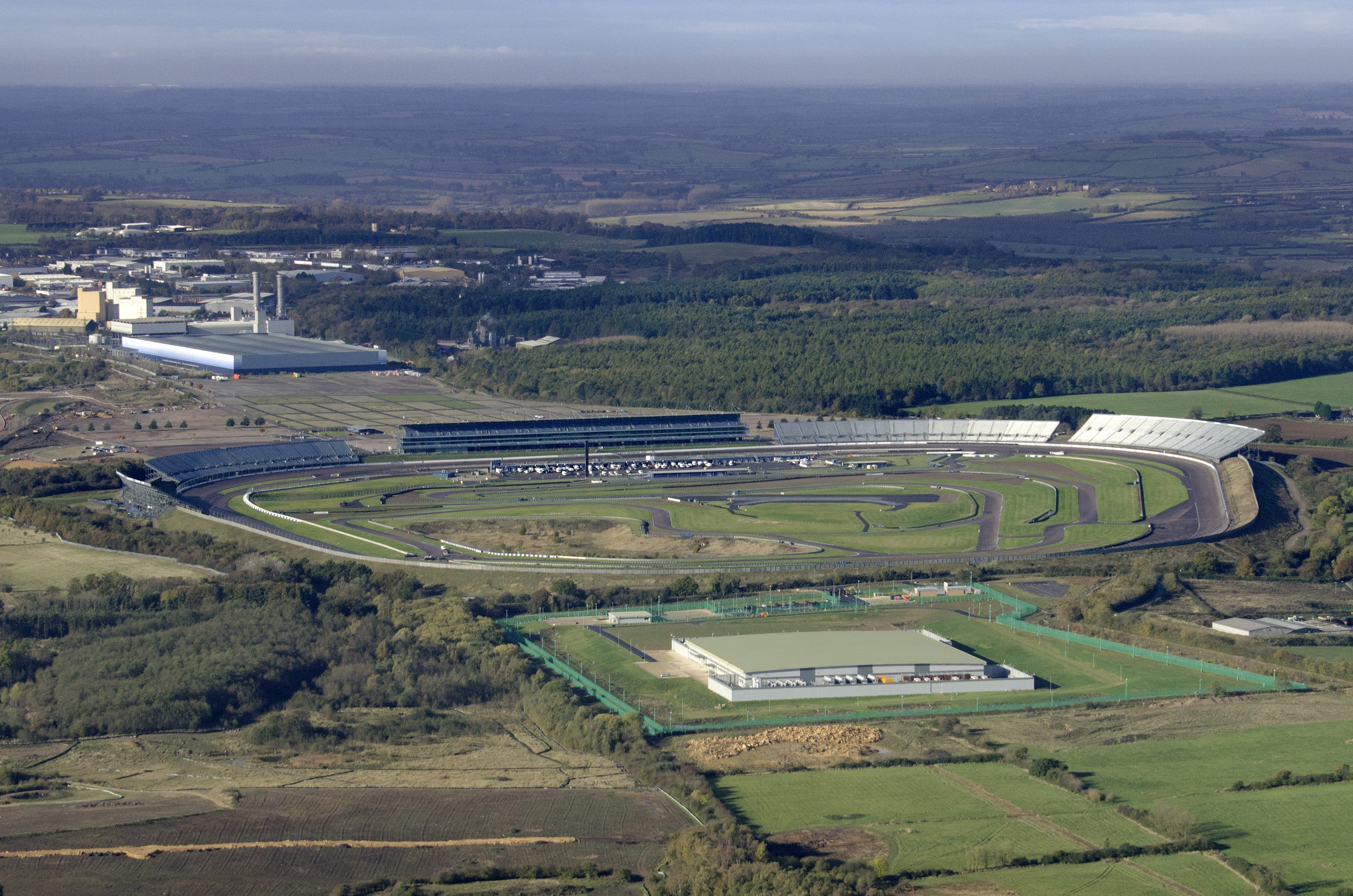
Aerial of Rockingham Motor Speedway

Between 2004 and 2007 all of the ASCAR races were held at the Rockingham Motor Speedway in England. The circuit was overlooked by the 6280 seat Rockingham Building, a steel-framed, glass-fronted grandstand building containing suites, offices, bars and kitchens, and by four grandstands. Together the building and grandstands offered a total seating capacity of 52,000. The inner pit and paddock complex was accessed from the Rockingham Building via two pedestrian tunnels and there was a further spectator viewing area on top of the pit garages. The 1.48 mile American-style banked oval circuit was 18.3 metres (60.0 ft) wide and had a maximum bank angle of seven degrees and comprised four very distinct corners. Rockingham's oval was unique in the UK and one of only two speedways in Europe (the other is Lausitzring). The oval circuit could also be converted to a road course layout for events by positioning temporary chicanes and curves both on the main area and apron of the circuit.

In 2002 and 2003 the series also raced in Germany at the EuroSpeedway Lausitz but the venue was eventually dropped due to the costs involved and the projected grid numbers of cars willing to make the journey. The entire 2008 season was a road racing based series as opposed to the Oval circuits. This incorporated trips to Snetterton, Cadwell Park, Lydden Race Circuit, Brands Hatch, Pembrey Circuit, Mallory Park and the French race track at Croix en Ternois.

Circuit	Years	Races	Notes
(United Kingdom) Rockingham Motor Speedway	2001–2007	72	Rockingham ran as the sole circuit for the entire series from 2004 to 2007.
(Germany) EuroSpeedway Lausitz	2001–2003	7	Lausitz was scheduled for 2001 but cancelled, it later hosted races in 2002 and 2003 before being dropped from the calendar.
(United Kingdom) Knockhill Racing Circuit	2001	0	The event at Knockhill was cancelled and removed from the calendar due to a fuel pickup issue.
(Republic of Ireland) Mondello Park	2001	0	The event at Mondello Park was cancelled and removed from the calendar due to a fuel pickup issue.
(United Kingdom) Snetterton Circuit	2008	4	The final season of competition saw the series run as a road racing championship.
(United Kingdom) Cadwell Park	2008	1	The final season of competition saw the series run as a road racing championship.
(United Kingdom) Lydden Hill Race Circuit	2008	1	The final season of competition saw the series run as a road racing championship.
(United Kingdom) Brands Hatch	2008	3	The final season of competition saw the series run as a road racing championship.
(France) Circuit de Croix-en-Ternois	2008	1	The final season of competition saw the series run as a road racing championship.
(United Kingdom) Mallory Park	2008	1	The final season of competition saw the series run as a road racing championship.

== Television coverage ==
In the United Kingdom, Motors TV aired full races of ASCAR, whilst Channel 4 aired a highlight show presented by Helen Chamberlain. In 2004 SCSA coverage reached 44 million viewers.

== List of race winners ==
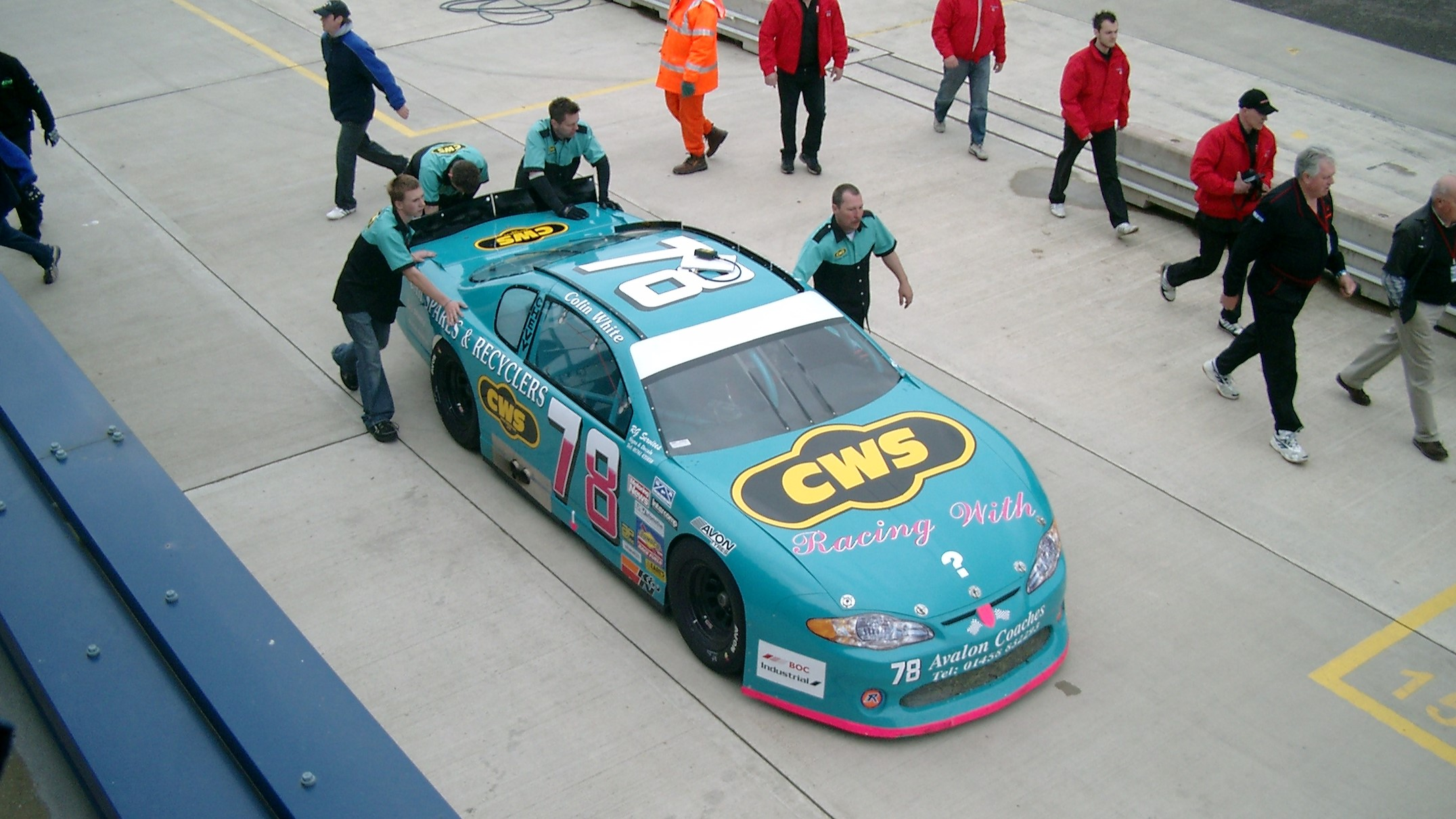
Colin White won the last oval title for the series in 2007, and is the most experienced driver, competing in all but one race meeting from 2001 to 2007.

Wins	Driver	Seasons competed
13	(United Kingdom) Colin White	2001–2007
10	(United Kingdom) Oli Playle	2003–2006
9	(United Kingdom) Ian McKellar Jr.	2002–2005
9	(Netherlands) Michael Vergers	2001, 2003–2005
7	(United Kingdom) Ben Collins	2002–2004
6	(United Kingdom) Darren Turner	2002
5	(United Kingdom) John Mickel	2001–2005
3	(United Kingdom) Kelvin Burt	2002
3	(United Kingdom) Stevie Hodgson	2002–2005
2	(United Kingdom) Kevin McGarrity	2002
2	(Germany) Roland Rehfeld	2002–2003
2	(United Kingdom) Hunter Abbott	2005–2007
1	(United Kingdom) John Steward	2001–2007
1	(United Kingdom) Rob Speak	2001–2004
1	(France) Nicolas Minassian	2002
1	(United Kingdom) Darren Manning	2002
1	(United Kingdom) Lee O'Keefe	2002, 2006–2007
1	(United Kingdom) Mark Willis	2004, 2006–2007

== See also ==
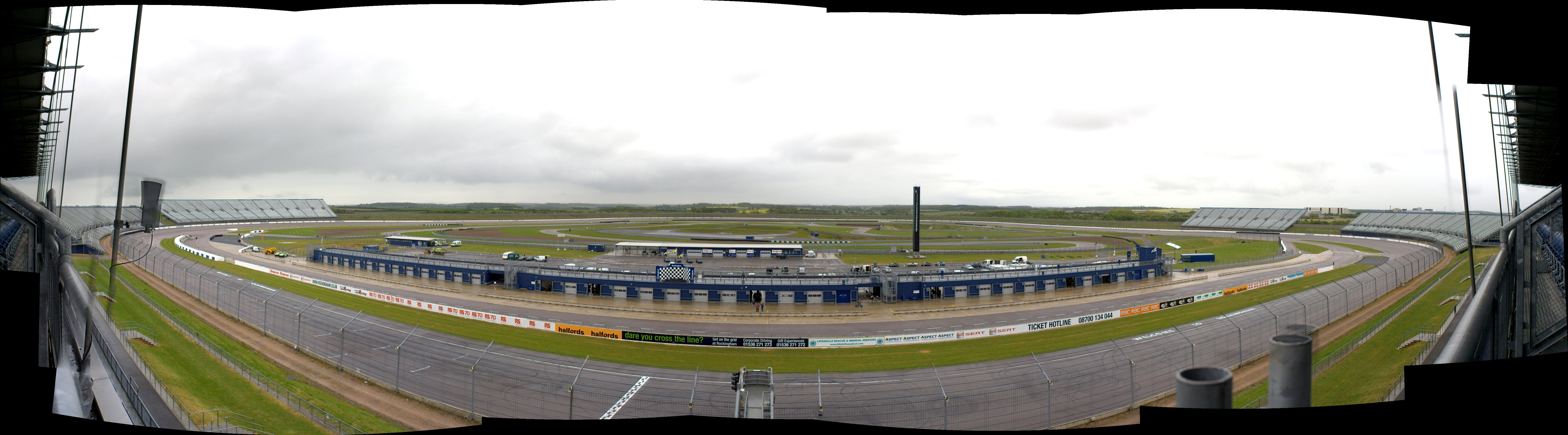
A panorama of Rockingham Motor Speedway
- Hot Rods (oval racing)
- Pickup Truck Racing
- NASCAR Whelen Euro Series
- NASCAR
