= European Late Model Series =

Stock car racing series

- Category: Stock car
- Country: (European Union) Europe
- Inaugural season: 2009
- Folded: 2013
- Constructors: Chevrolet, Ford, Pontiac
- Official website: European Late Model Series

European Late Model Series was a stock car racing series that raced at short ovals in Europe, primarily in Belgium and the UK and later also in the Netherlands.

== History ==
The series came about as the result of talks among CAMSO, Spedeworth International Ltd. and SCSA V8 Trophy. The thoughts were around the fact there are so many late model type stock cars in Europe which are not racing, and it seemed silly not to do something about it. For 2009 racing driver Tony Roots took over the CAMSO organisation with other drivers Colin White and John Stuard. The organisers put together a calendar which featured the Warneton ten times and Lydden Hill and Hednesford once. Eighteen drivers joined the series for the first races. A summary of the weekend was broadcast on Motors TV UK. Each raceday featured 2 25 lap heat races and a 35 lap final. The first ever race of the series was won by Gary Ellis in a Chevrolet. In 2010 the series expanded to include Ipswich in its schedule and in 2011 Venray was added to the series.

Because of disagreements between promoters at Venray and Warneton, the series split in 2013. The CAMSO V8 name was revived for the championship held at Warneton, which also includes visits to Lydden Hill, while the championship held at Venray was named the LMV8 Supercup.

For 2017 the Series will be revived with races at Warneton and Lelystad.

== Cars ==
European Late Model Series is open to North American Stock Cars with a wheelbase of 104-105 inches. Performance is equalised to allow cars from both old series to race against each other competitively.

== Tracks ==
More than half the rounds take place at the Belgian oval track in Warneton. Rounds in the UK include visits to Ipswich, Hednesford and Lydden Hill. Multiple rounds on the new half mile oval in Venray, the Netherlands have also been announced for the 2011 season.

== See also ==
- Hot Rods (oval racing)
- Pickup Truck Racing
