= RML Short Wheelbase =

Grand tourer produced by the RML Group

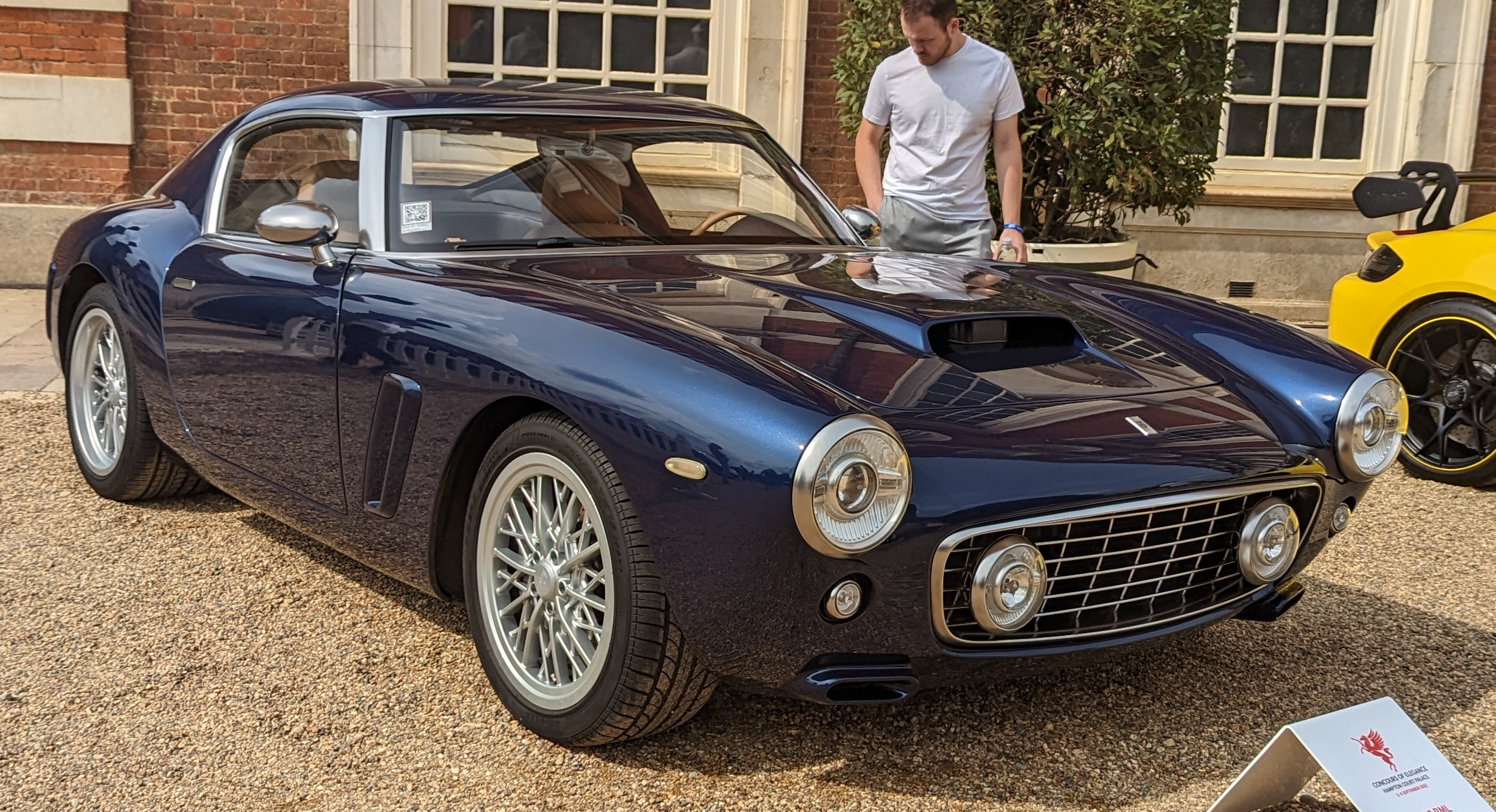
- 2022 RML SWB at Hampton Concours in 2022

Overview
- Manufacturer: RML Group
- Production: 2021–present
- Designer: Jonathan Bowen

Body and chassis
- Class: Grand tourer (S)
- Body style: 2-door berlinetta
- Layout: Front-engine, rear-wheel-drive

Powertrain
- Engine: 5.5 L Tipo F133A/C V12
- Power output: 485 hp
- Transmission: 6-speed manual

Dimensions
- Length: 4,264 mm (167.9 in)
- Width: 1,954 mm (76.9 in)
- Kerb weight: 3,241 lb (1,470 kg)

The RML Short Wheelbase is a grand tourer produced by the RML Group.

== History ==
The Short Wheelbase, designed as a coupé, was presented in May 2021 after around three years of development. Series production of the vehicle, which is limited to 30 examples, is scheduled to begin at the end of 2021.

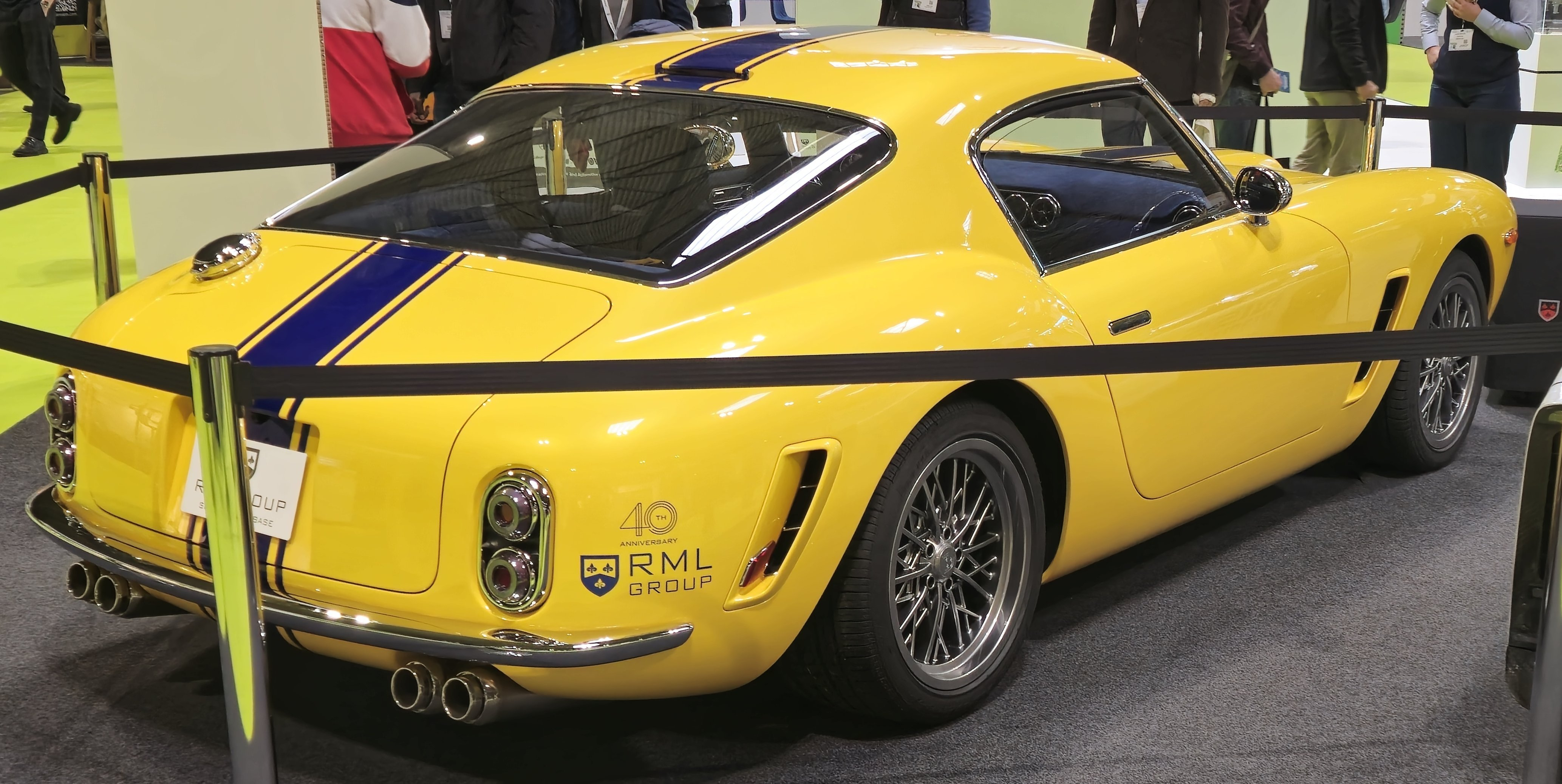
A yellow RML SWB at NEC in 2024

The model is reminiscent of the Ferrari 250 GT SWB built between 1959 and 1962 with 167 copies built. The design takes up numerous elements of the Ferrari. Among other things, the shape of the radiator grille, the missing bumpers or the air scoop in the bonnet are design elements that Ferrari also used. However, the multi-spoke wheels does not have wing nuts. The Short Wheelbase also does not use any plastic in the interior. Instead, aluminum, glass and leather are used. In contrast to the 250 GT SWB, the car has air conditioning and a navigation system, which can be lowered into the center console.

== Specifications ==
Technically, the Short Wheelbase is based on the Ferrari 550 Maranello built between 1996 and 2001. It is equipped with a 5.5-liter V12 naturally aspirated engine with 357 kW (485 hp). The Coupé accelerate to 100 kilometres per hour (62 mph) in 4.1 seconds, the top speed is specified as 298 kilometres per hour (185 mph).
