= RML Group =

British engineering firm and motor racing constructor & team

(United Kingdom) RML Group
- Founded: 1984
- Founder(s): Ray Mallock
- Current series: BTCC - Official Parts Supplier
- Former series: WTCC; European Le Mans Series; ASCAR; WRC; South African Touring Car Championship; World Sportscar Championship; JWRC; Spanish GT Championship; British Rally Championship
- Teams' Championships: 1995 (BTCC); 1998 (BTCC); 1999 (BTCC); 2001 (ELMS -GTS); 2002 (ASCAR); 2003 (ASCAR); 2007 (LMS -LMP2); 2010 (LMS -LMP2); 2010 WTCC; 2011 WTCC; 2012 WTCC; 2013 WTCC Y. T. Trophy
- Drivers' Championships: 1986 (Mallock, Leslie -C2); 1995 (Cleland -BTCC); 1999 (Aiello -BTCC); 2001 (McKellar, Lambert -GTS); 2007(Newton, Erdos -LMP2); 2010(Newton, Erdos -LMP2); 2010(Plato -BTCC); 2010(Muller-WTCC); 2011(Muller-WTCC); 2012(Huff-WTCC); 2013(Muller-WTCC)
- Website: rmlgroup.com

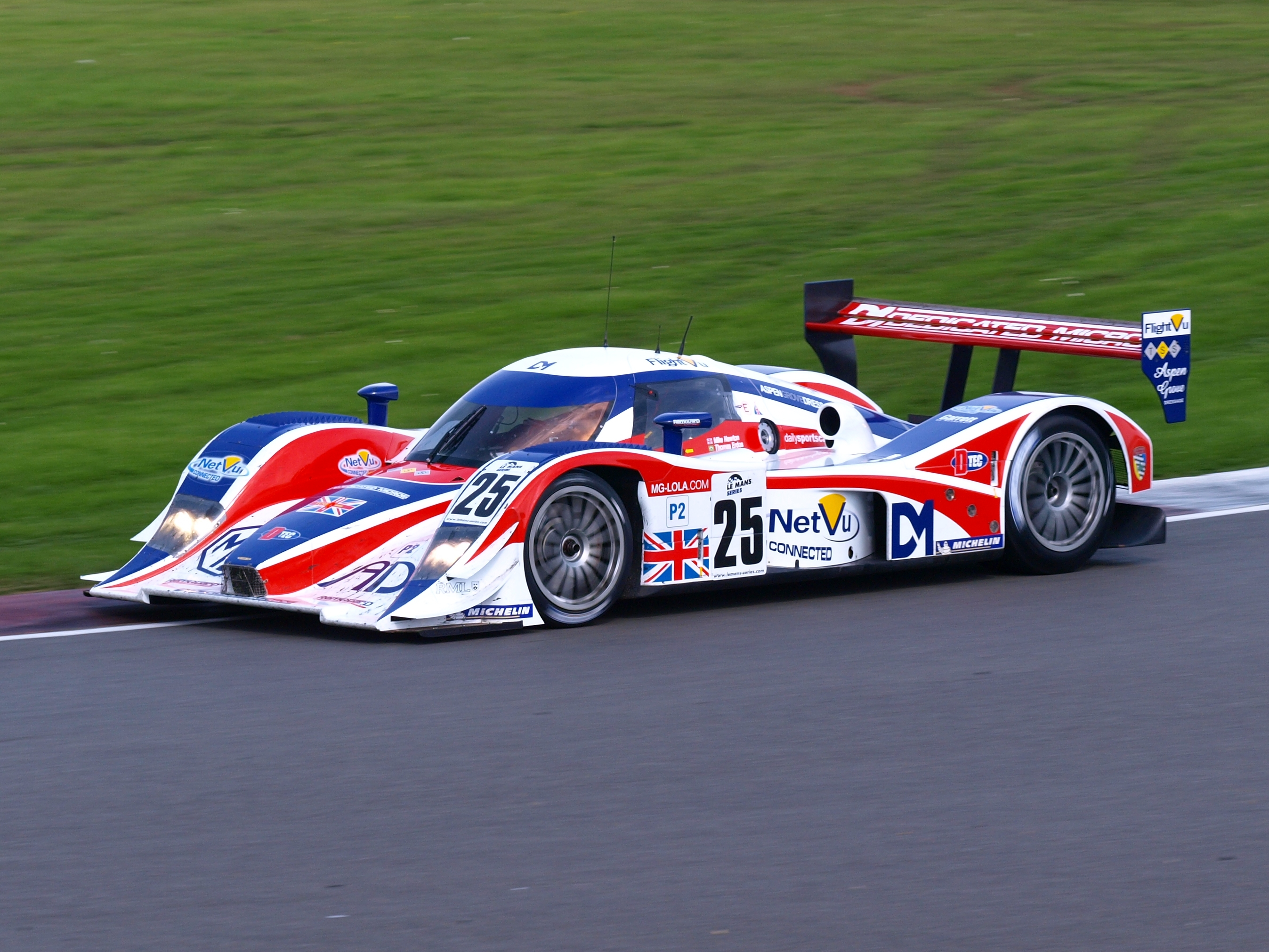
RML's former entry in the Le Mans Series, the MG-Lola EX265C Le Mans Prototype

RML Group (Ray Mallock Ltd.) is a British total engineering solutions company based in Wellingborough, Northamptonshire, England. Founded in the 1984 by Ray Mallock as a motorsport team, the group has since expanded to provide advanced engineering services to OEMs and other companies in the automotive sector, as well as those in defence, aerospace, and marine.

The company has a prestigious heritage in motorsports and high-performance vehicles, and as of 2025 saw significant investment in RML Group, including the installation of a new senior management team with CEO Paul Dickinson joining the board. Operations are spread across four divisions – Power, Engineering, Motorsport and Bespoke.

Powertrain and engineering expertise have seen RMLGroup work with likes of Aston Martin, McLaren Automotive, Bentley, NIO, Lotus Cars, Nissan and MG Motor on projects, while experience with electrification in motorsport has seen the development of the VarEVolt scalable platform which allows RML Group to provide bespoke, high-performance batteries for hybrid and electric vehicles.

RML supports manufacturers with factory motorsport projects and race teams across a range of formulae, including touring cars and GT racing. At a series level, the group has a contract as Official Parts Supplier to the British Touring Car Championship, providing specified NGCT-specification chassis, suspension and steering components to all teams in the competition.

The company's Bespoke division has delivered a range of projects direct to customers, initially the RML Short Wheelbase (SWB) 1960s-style grand tourer launched in 2021 and currently the Le Mans-inspired GT Hypercar.

== Group divisions ==
=== Power ===
RML's Power division is responsible for design, development and manufacturing across powertrain projects, including advanced battery systems and bespoke engine builds. Facilities include R&D, laser welding and end-of-line testing capabilities, delivering projects for teams in motorsport and OEMs in the automotive sector, as well as off-highway industries.

=== Engineering ===
The Engineering division within RML develops advanced engineering projects across automotive, aerospace, defence, marine and motorsport industries. The team works on systems such as chassis and vehicle dynamics development, aerodynamics, powertrain integration, and cockpit systems with past projects including vehicles such as the Nio EP9 and McLaren Senna GTR.

=== Motorsport ===
RML Group was established as a motorsport team, and more than 40 years later, motor racing remains a key focus. From designing championship-winning cars to running world class racing teams, RML Group holds multiple world and national championships, and supports a variety of racing series as parts supplier and car builder.

=== Bespoke ===
Bespoke is a RML's showcase division that creates vehicles.

== Early history ==
Ray Mallock began building racing cars, alongside his brother Richard, as an assistant to his father, Major Arthur Mallock, who created the Mallock U2 chassis for Clubmans racing. After racing in Formula 3, Formula Atlantic and sports car racing, Mallock founded his team, Ray Mallock Atlantic Racing, in 1979, which he renamed RML in 1984.

== Sports car racing ==
Ray Mallock, a driver for Viscount Downe Racing, helped develop the privateer Aston Martin-powered Nimrod NRA/C2 for Group C regulations in the World Endurance Championship in 1982, 1983 and 1984. In 1984, RML was contracted to build the Ecurie Ecosse prototypes for the C2 class, winning the class title in 1986.

In 1987, RML returned to the main class by developing the Aston Martin AMR-1. The project was closed in 1990, but RML found work with the works Nissan team instead. RML developed and prepared NPTI's Nissan R90CK programme for Le Mans. One of the cars manages to lead the race for five hours and set a new lap record.

In 1999, RML returned sportscars by producing the RML Mallock P20 Supersports Car, in association with Mallock Sports his brother Richard's company. The car won the National Supersports championships in 1999 and in 2000, when it was driven by Michael Mallock.

In 2000, RML created the Saleen S7 supercar initially as a road car, and then the racing version the S7-R, winning the European Le Mans Series in the GT1 class in 2001 and the Spanish GT Championship overall in 2002. In 2004 RML entered the FIA GT Championship with two cars.

Also in 2004, RML ran an MG-Lola EX257 in the Le Mans 24 Hours and Le Mans Endurance Series. After the design became obsolete with the onset of new LMP2 regulations, RML merged components from the EX257 into the Lola B05/40's chassis and bodyshell, creating the MG-Lola EX264, which won Le Mans in the LMP2 class in 2005 and 2006.

The team's car was further upgraded for the 2008 Le Mans Series season, using a new XP21 motor developed by MG, and renaming the car EX265. This car was then replaced before the season finale by a coupe bodystyle, based on the new Lola B08/80. Using components of the EX265, including the MG XP21 motor, the new car was christened the EX265C, and made its debut at the 2008 1000km of Silverstone.

In 2009, the team turned to the Mazda MZR-R turbocharged engine in the back of the Lola B08/80, abandoning the MG moniker, but issues with the spec fuel caused several engine failures over the season, the car finishing only twice over the whole season. For the 2010 season, the team is retaining the Lola B08/80 chassis, but with a normally aspirated V8 engine developed by Honda Performance Development, the same engine used in the HPD ARX-01.

RML competed in the Le Mans Series in 2011 with a HPD ARX-01d LMP2 car, becoming the second team to run the ARX-01 in Europe after Strakka Racing.

In 2012, RML developed a new engine on behalf of Nissan for the unique Nissan DeltaWing RML, as Nissans Motorsport Partner ran the car and provided engineering and technical support at Le Mans 24 hours and Petit Le Mans where it finished 5th overall.

For 2014, RML were engaged to design and build the Nissan ZEOD RC, an innovative racing car designed to run in Le Mans Garage 56. The car was the first to switch between Electric and Petrol powered Propulsion. RML were responsible for the whole vehicle, including developing a high performance lightweight powertrain. The engine was a new RML design, a 3-cylinder 1.5 litre weighing only 40 kg and producing over 400 bhp. The ZOED RC suffered a gearbox failure due to a new part with a material defect early in the 24 hour race, however in practice had achieved the first ever all electric lap of Le Mans and over 300 km/h on in Electric mode.

=== 24 Hours of Le Mans results ===
Year	Entrant	No.	Car	Drivers	Class	Laps	Pos.	Class Pos.
1982	(United Kingdom) Nimrod Racing Automobiles	31	Nimrod NRA/C2-Aston Martin	(United Kingdom) Bob Evans (United Kingdom) Geoff Lees (United Kingdom) Tiff Needell	Group C	55	DNF	DNF
1982	(United Kingdom) Viscount Downe Racing (private entrant)	32	Nimrod NRA/C2-Aston Martin	(United Kingdom) Ray Mallock (United Kingdom) Simon Phillips (United Kingdom) Mike Salmon	Group C	317	7th	4th
1983	(United Kingdom) Viscount Downe Racing (private entrant) (United Kingdom) Pace Petroleum	39	Nimrod NRA/C2-Aston Martin	(United States) Steve Earle (United Kingdom) Ray Mallock (United Kingdom) Mike Salmon	Group C	218	DNF	DNF
1984	(United Kingdom) Viscount Downe Racing (private entrant) (United Kingdom) Aston Martin Lagonda	31	Nimrod NRA/C2B-Aston Martin	(United Kingdom) Ray Mallock (United States) Drake Olson	Group C1	94	DNF	DNF
1984	(United Kingdom) Viscount Downe Racing (private entrant) (United Kingdom) Aston Martin Lagonda	32	Nimrod NRA/C2B-Aston Martin	(United Kingdom) Richard Attwood (United Kingdom) Mike Salmon (United Kingdom) John Sheldon	Group C1	92	DNF	DNF
1984	(United Kingdom) Ecurie Ecosse	77	Ecosse C284-Cosworth	(United Kingdom) David Duffield (United Kingdom) David Leslie (United Kingdom) Mike Wilds	Group C2	36	DNF	DNF
1985	(United Kingdom) Ecurie Ecosse	79	Ecosse C285-Cosworth	(United Kingdom) David Leslie (United Kingdom) Ray Mallock (United Kingdom) Mike Wilds	Group C2	45	DNF	DNF
1986	(United Kingdom) Ecurie Ecosse	78	Ecosse C285-Cosworth	(United States) Les Delano (United States) John Hotchkis (United States) Andy Petery	Group C2	293	15th	4th
1986	(United Kingdom) Ecurie Ecosse	79	Ecosse C286-Austin Rover	(United Kingdom) David Leslie (United Kingdom) Ray Mallock (United Kingdom) Mike Wilds	Group C2	181	DSQ	DSQ
1987	(United Kingdom) Swiftair Ecurie Ecosse	101	Ecosse C286-Cosworth	(United States) Les Delano (United States) Andy Petery (United Kingdom) Mike Wilds	Group C2	135	DNF	DNF
1987	(United Kingdom) Swiftair Ecurie Ecosse	102	Ecosse C286-Cosworth	(Belgium) Marc Duez (United Kingdom) David Leslie (United Kingdom) Ray Mallock	Group C2	308	8th	2nd
1989	(United Kingdom) Aston Martin (United Kingdom) Ecurie Ecosse	18	Aston Martin AMR1	(Greece) Costas Los (United Kingdom) Brian Redman (Republic of Ireland) Michael Roe	Group C1	340	11th	9th
1989	(United Kingdom) Aston Martin (United Kingdom) Ecurie Ecosse	19	Aston Martin AMR1	(United Kingdom) David Leslie (United Kingdom) Ray Mallock (United Kingdom) David Sears	Group C1	153	DNF	DNF
1990	(Japan) Nissan Motorsports (United States) Nissan Performance Technology Inc.	83	Nissan R90CK	(Australia) Geoff Brabham (Republic of Ireland) Derek Daly (United States) Chip Robinson	Group C1	251	DNF	DNF
1990	(Japan) Nissan Motorsports (United States) Nissan Performance Technology Inc.	84	Nissan R90CK	(United States) Bob Earl (New Zealand) Steve Millen (Republic of Ireland) Michael Roe	Group C1	311	17th	17th
2001	(United Kingdom) RML	62	Saleen S7-R	(Belgium) Bruno Lambert (United Kingdom) Ian McKellar (United Kingdom) Johnny Mowlem	LMGTS	175	DNF	DNF
2002	(United Kingdom) RML	68	Saleen S7-R	(Portugal) Pedro Chaves (United Kingdom) Gavin Pickering (Portugal) Miguel Ramos	LMGTS	312	23rd	5th
2003	(United Kingdom) Graham Nash Motorsport (United Kingdom) Ray Mallock Ltd.	64	Saleen S7-R	(Portugal) Pedro Chaves (Brazil) Thomas Erdos (United Kingdom) Mike Newton	LMGTS	292	NC	NC
2004	(United Kingdom) Ray Mallock Ltd. (RML)	25	MG-Lola EX257-AER	(Brazil) Thomas Erdos (United Kingdom) Nathan Kinch (United Kingdom) Mike Newton	LMP1	256	DNF	DNF
2005	(United Kingdom) Ray Mallock Ltd. (RML)	25	MG-Lola EX264-Judd	(Brazil) Thomas Erdos (United Kingdom) Warren Hughes (United Kingdom) Mike Newton	LMP2	305	20th	1st
2006	(United Kingdom) Ray Mallock Ltd. (RML)	25	MG-Lola EX264-AER	(Brazil) Thomas Erdos (United Kingdom) Mike Newton (United Kingdom) Andy Wallace	LMP2	343	8th	1st
2007	(United Kingdom) Ray Mallock Ltd. (RML)	25	MG-Lola EX264-AER	(Brazil) Thomas Erdos (United Kingdom) Mike Newton (United Kingdom) Andy Wallace	LMP2	251	DNF	DNF
2008	(United Kingdom) Ray Mallock Ltd. (RML)	25	MG-Lola EX265-AER	(Brazil) Thomas Erdos (United Kingdom) Mike Newton (United Kingdom) Andy Wallace	LMP2	100	DNF	DNF
2009	(United Kingdom) RML	25	Lola B08/86-Mazda	(United States) Chris Dyson (Brazil) Thomas Erdos (United Kingdom) Mike Newton	LMP2	273	DNF	DNF
2010	(United Kingdom) RML	25	Lola B08/80-HPD	(Brazil) Thomas Erdos (United Kingdom) Mike Newton (United Kingdom) Andy Wallace	LMP2	358	8th	3rd
2011	(United Kingdom) RML	36	HPD ARX-01d	(United Kingdom) Ben Collins (Brazil) Thomas Erdos (United Kingdom) Mike Newton	LMP2	314	12th	4th
2012	(United States) Highcroft Racing	0	DeltaWing-Nissan	(United Kingdom) Marino Franchitti (Germany) Michael Krumm (Japan) Satoshi Motoyama	CDNT	75	DNF	DNF
2014	(Japan) Nissan Motorsports Global	0	Nissan ZEOD RC	(Japan) Satoshi Motoyama (Spain) Lucas Ordóñez (Belgium) Wolfgang Reip	CDNT	5	DNF	DNF

== Touring car racing ==
=== British Touring Car Championship ===
==== Vauxhall (1992–1996) ====
Taking advantage of its relationship to Ecurie Ecosse, RML made its debut in touring car racing in 1992, by moving to the British Touring Car Championship. The team ran two semi-works Vauxhall Cavaliers for Ecurie Ecosse for two years.

RML built its first ground up Super touring car the Vauxhall Cavalier RML P7 in 1993, it took RML's maiden BTCC victory with David Leslie at the wheel at Thruxton.

Due to the team's success, RML was awarded with the works Vauxhall contract in 1994 taking over from Dave Cook Racing, winning the championship the following year. The RML Vauxhall Cavalier RML P11 won the 1995 in both the teams and Drivers standings. Vauxhall launched the new Vectra RML P12 for 1996. The season was a transitional year with the team scoring just one victory with James Thompson.

==== Nissan (1997–1999) ====
RML's association with Nissan in touring car racing began with the design of South African Touring car championship Sentra RML P8 in 1993. It grew in 1997 moving on from Vauxhall to become the works partner for Nissan in Super Touring, being responsible for the build, development and operation of the BTCC cars as well as the build of the cars for the German and Japanese series.

The team won the BTCC manufacturers' and teams' titles in 1998 & 1999 with RML project numbers P17 & P18 respectively and the drivers' championship in 1999 with Laurent Aïello.

==== SEAT (2004) ====
In 2004, RML contracted with SEAT Sport UK to run two SEAT Toledo Cupras in the BTCC with drivers Jason Plato and Rob Huff, at the end of the year RML moved into the WTCC with Chevrolet.

==== Chevrolet (2009–2011) ====
RML re-entered the BTCC in 2009, running their ex-WTCC Chevrolet Lacettis for 2001 champion Jason Plato, Mat Jackson since round two and James Nash since round four. The 2009 campaign brought good results, taking 11 wins and Plato taking second in the drivers championship. In 2010, Chevrolet gave the team full works backing with a pair of Cruzes driven by the returning Plato and series debutant Alex MacDowall. Plato won the drivers championship in 2010 with 7 race wins, before winning eight races in 2011 but finishing third in the championship as the Honda pair of champion Matt Neal and runner-up Gordon Shedden had better consistency over the course of the season. On 1 February 2012, Chevrolet announced that they will be pulling out of the BTCC to focus on the WTCC, therefore RML will not be taking part in the 2012 BTCC season.

==== Mercedes/Plato Racing (2026) ====
For 2026, former RML BTCC driver Jason Plato founded his own team, fittingly called Plato Racing. He would utilise the RML warehouse as a base for the team. The team fielded 2 Mercedes A35 Saloon cars for Daniel Rowbottom and Adam Morgan, who'd both previously driven the original Mercedes A45 in 2019 together. Plato would modify the car to be front-wheel drive rather than the factory-standard rear-wheel drive. RML served as a chassis and parts supplier for the team.

=== World Touring Car Championship ===
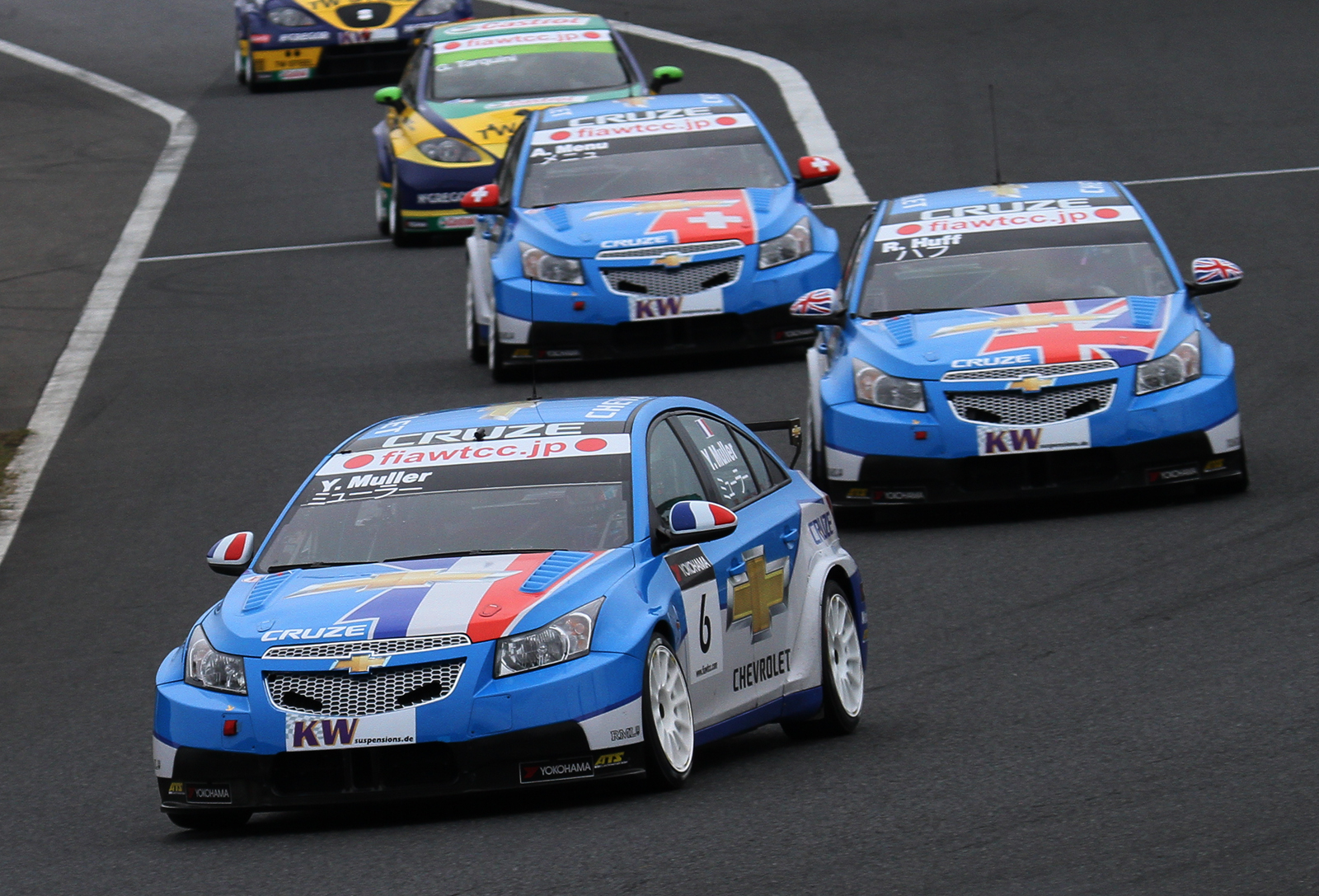
Yvan Muller won his second Drivers' Championship and Chevrolet won the Manufacturers' Championship for the first time in 2010.

==== Chevrolet (2005–2012) ====
RML won the contract to build, develop and run the works Chevrolet Lacetti in the WTCC from the 2005 season. The Lacetti won its first race in 2006, before taking a further 7 wins in 2007 and 5 wins in 2008. In 2009 the new Chevrolet Cruze was introduced and took 6 wins in the first year. In 2010, the Chevrolet team won both the Manufacturers Championship by a substantial 74 points and, with Yvan Muller, won the Drivers Championship. The RML Chevrolet team won the WTCC again in 2011 with Muller and again in 2012 with Rob Huff. On 4 July 2012, Chevrolet Europe announced that the 2012 season will be the last for the Chevrolet WTCC team.

==== Independent entry (2013) ====
On 4 March 2013, RML announced they would enter the WTCC in 2013 as an independent two-car entry with Chevrolet Cruzes run for Yvan Muller and new recruit from the closed down Team Aon team, Tom Chilton. Muller will win the 2013 WTCC championship & Chilton finishes 5th overall.

Since 2014, RML develops the Chevrolet Cruze to the new 2014 TC1 specs for various teams, but did not field a team.

=== South African Touring Car Championship ===
RML built the works Nissan Sentra for the South African Touring Car Championship.

== Rallying ==
At the end of 1997, Opel decided to cut down its involvement in touring cars, and contracted RML to the develop the Opel Astra Kit-car for the Formula 2 regulations for them in the World Rally Championship and several national rallying championships in Europe. In 1999, the RML Astra won titles in Germany, Norway and Sweden.

In late 2000 Opel assigned RML to design and build the Opel Corsa for the new Super 1600 category, which replaced the F2 kit-cars. The car made its competition debut in the 2002 JWRC class of the Monte Carlo Rally and its first title the following year.

During this period RML were responsible for the build, development and customer support of all Opel Astra and Corsa Rally cars.

== Formula One ==
RML considered lodging an entry for the 2010 Formula One World Championship, however decided against it, citing the current uncertainty over 2010 regulations as their reason for doing so. They were to use Cosworth engines had they submitted an entry. RML have also said they are still considering an entry into Formula One in the future.

== Other series ==
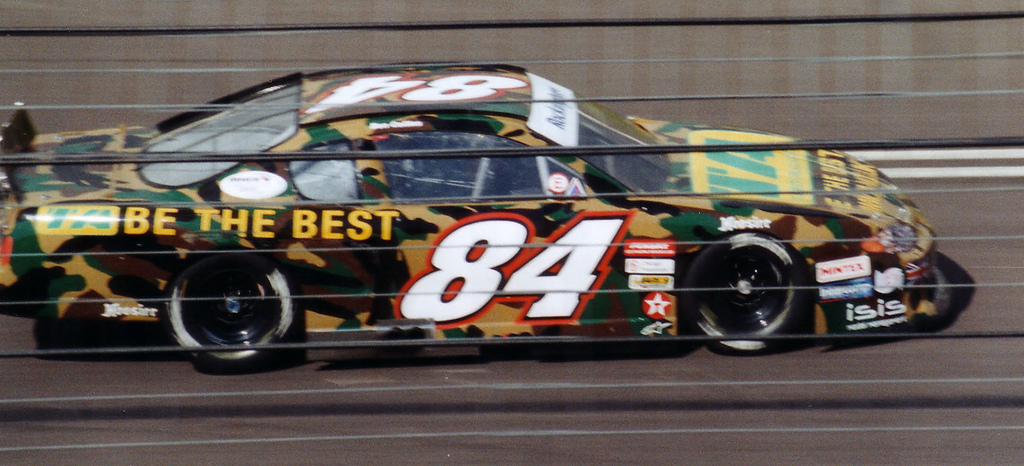
2003 ASCAR Champion Ben Collins.

In 2002, RML entered the British ASCAR stock car series, based on ASA-type racing, winning the 2002 and 2003 titles with Nicolas Minassian and Ben Collins. Also in 2002, RML prepared Darren Manning's Team St. George car for the British Champ Car race at the Rockingham race track.

== Road cars ==
RML's engineering skills were used in road-going cars for the first time in 1990, when the company built a small number of Ford GT40 replicas. In 1994, RML created several concept sketches for an undisclosed Japanese manufacturer.

In 1999, RML returned with two different projects, the Opel Astra Concept DTM, a road-going prototype based on the Opel Astra Coupé the German company would debut the following year, and the ground up design of the Saleen S7.

In 2003, Nissan ordered a prototype based on the new Nissan Micra, powered initially by a 265 hp (198 kW) Touring Car race engine (with a 6-speed sequential gearbox), and later by a 309 hp (230 kW) Nismo tuned V6 engine and called Micra R. The car debuted in the Geneva Auto Show.

In 2011, RML showcased the Nissan Juke-R with Nissan announcing a limited production run of 'the worlds fastest crossover' in 2012.

In 2014, RML developed and built the Q50 Eau Rouge concept on behalf of Infiniti Motor Co.

RML Group produced a road-legal converted version of the Aston Martin Vulcan some time before 2018.

In 2021, RML showcased the Short Wheelbase, essentially a modern classic inspired by the famed Ferrari 250 GT SWB. Only a few months later, RML released more details, indicating that only 30 units would be made, going on sale before the end of 2021.

=== GT Hypercar ===
Developed under the P39 codename, RML Group designed and built the GT Hypercar as a modern-day interpretation of road-going Le Mans racers.

Featuring a 912 PS (900 bhp) turbocharged six-cylinder engine, active aerodynamics and a carbon fibre body, the GT Hypercar is intended to be the ultimate track-day weapon, but one that is comfortable to drive to and from the circuit. The first customer car was delivered in September 2025, with production under way at RML Group's Wellingborough campus.
