= Amanda Stretton =

British racing driver and broadcaster

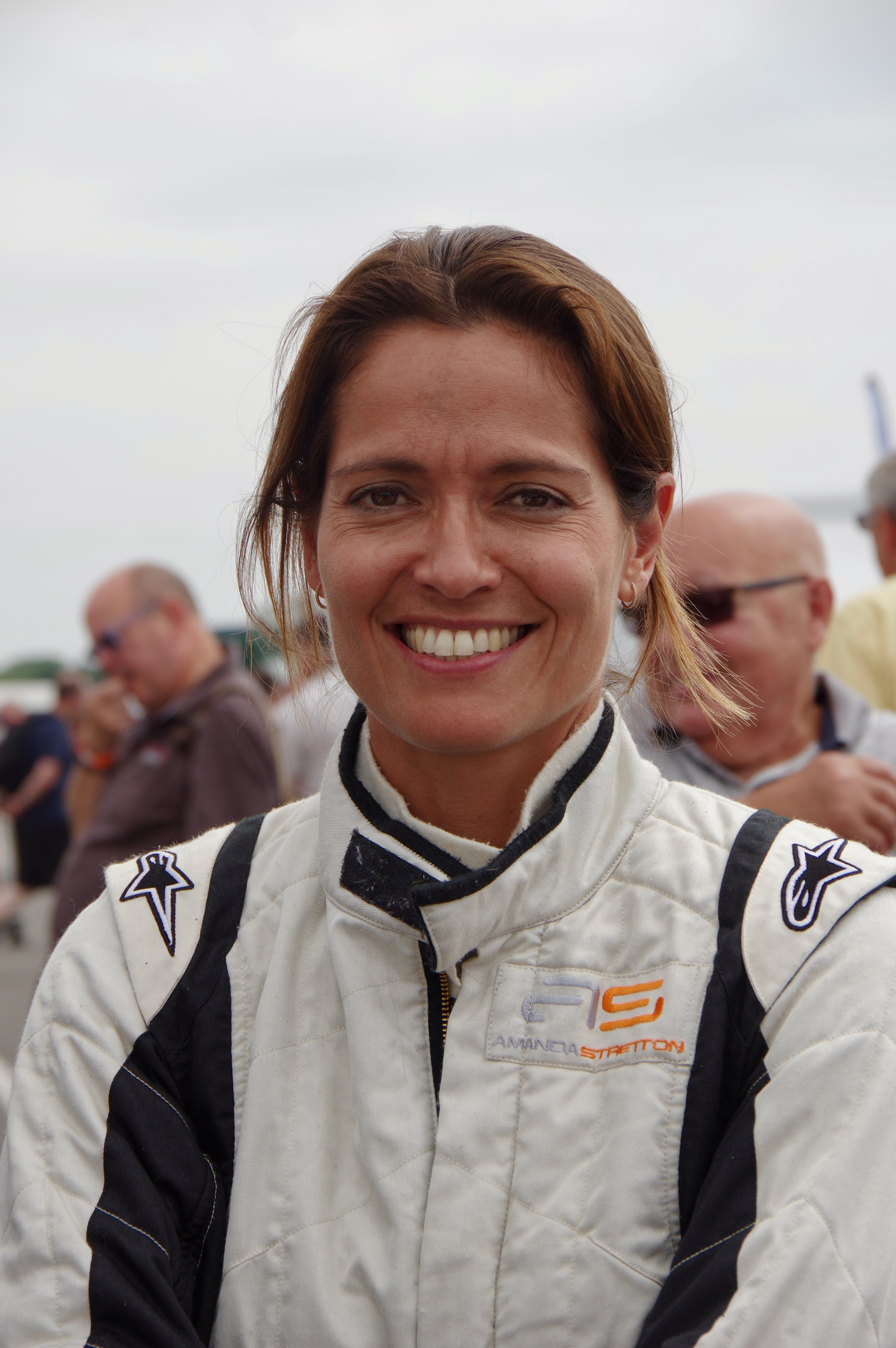
- Stretton in 2018
- Born: Amanda Birgitte Cohn; 24 July 1973 (age 53); London, United Kingdom
- Occupations: Racing driver, broadcaster, motoring journalist
- Championships: ASCAR Mintex Cup; British GT Championships
- Wins: Spa-Francorchamps

Amanda Birgitte Stretton (née Cohn; born 24 July 1973, in London) is an English racing driver, broadcaster and motoring journalist.

== Early life and education ==
The daughter of British automobile collector and historic racer Terry Cohn, she grew up in London and was educated at New Hall School in Essex. At age 13, she raced Motocross bikes.

== Career ==
=== Motor racing ===
In 2001, Stretton became the first ever female driver to compete in the ASCAR Mintex Cup where she finished in sixth place. In 2003, she entered the first ever female team in the British GT Championships, and was the first British female to race in the FIA Championships. In September 2004 she became the first British woman to win an international long-distance event at Spa-Francorchamps, Belgium, beating her husband, a competitor. In 2006, she competed in the 24 Hours of Le Mans race.

=== Media career ===
Stretton was invited on to a television show to debate the proposal that "Women can't drive or race", and in light of her feisty and intellectual defence of women as drivers and her actual track record, was offered a position with Channel 4 to co-present their motorsports coverage under the title "Motorsport on 4" which included the British Formula 3, GT, MGF and Rally Championships, as well as the Anglo-American Stock Car Racing series and UK Supercross. She has also presented Channel 4's Driven.

After Channel 4 lost the television rights to the majority of their motorsports events, Stretton presented most of the events for the new rights holders including Sky Sports, EuroSport, and Silverstone TV; and is one of the radio commentators for the American and European Le Mans Series. She also picked up presentation on non-motorsports events for the Travel Channel and NOW.com.

Stretton presented Channel 5's Dream Machine series, in which classic cars are restored or kit cars which replicate them are built; as well as UK Horror Homes. With Murray Walker she co-presented ITV1's coverage of the Goodwood Festival of Speed, the Goodwood Revival and The Goodwood Members Meeting for many years. Away from the track, she has presented "Wrecks to Riches" for Discovery Home & Leisure, is a freelance journalist and writes for a range of newspaper columns and specialist motoring titles. Stretton has been a brand spokesperson and presenter for Mercedes-Benz, Michelin and now the Panasonic Jaguar Racing Formula E Team.

Stretton is the motoring editor at Confused.com.

Stretton is Patron of the Rhodesian Ridgeback Welfare Trust.

In March 2024, Stretton became an ambassador for the cancer care charity Hope for Tomorrow, which operates a fleet of mobile cancer care units across the UK to bring treatment closer to patients. Her role involves raising awareness of the charity's mission to increase access to cancer care services.

== Personal life ==
Stretton has a daughter and a son.

== 24 Hours of Le Mans results ==
Year	Team	Co-Drivers	Car	Class	Laps	Pos.	Class Pos.
2008	(United Kingdom) Chamberlain-Synergy Motorsport	(United Kingdom) Bob Berridge (United Kingdom) Gareth Evans	Lola B06/10-AER	LMP1	87	DNF	DNF
