= Nankang =

Nankang may refer to:

== Mainland China ==
- Nankang District, Ganzhou, Jiangxi
- Nankang District (南康镇), in Lushan City, Jiangxi
- Nankang, Guangxi (南康镇), town in Tieshangang District, Beihai, Guangxi

== Taiwan ==
- Nankang Rubber Tire (南港輪胎股份有限公司), tire manufacturer based in Taipei
- Nangang District, Taipei (南港區)
