= Nic Grindrod =

- Nationality: (England) English
- Debut season: 2002
- Car number: 22
- Engine: Vauxhall C20XE
- Crew chief: Karl Grindrod
- Spotter: Viking Team
- Championships: 2
- Wins: 13
- Best finish: 1st in ?
- Finished last season: 13th

Nic Grindrod (born 12 January 1975) is a racecar driver. He has raced the #22 pickup since 2002 in the UK Pickup Truck Racing series.

== Career history ==
- 2005 Pickup Truck Racing Championship – championship winner
- 2006 Pickup Truck Racing Championship – championship winner
- 2007 Pickup Truck Racing Championship – 2nd overall, Rockingham Oval Champion
- 2008 Pickup Truck Racing Championship – 13th overall 2nd Rockingham Oval Championship
- 2009 Pickup Truck Racing Championship -
- 2021 BRSCC Nankang Tyre CityCar Cup Champion
