= Lee Rogers (racing driver) =

Lee "Roge" Rogers
- Lee Rogers
- Nationality: (United Kingdom)
- Debut season: 2005
- Current team: Team Rogers Racing
- Car number: 69
- Engine: 16v Vauxhall 2.3
- Crew chief: Mike Serjeant
- Spotter: Annie Rogers
- Championships: 2013 Pro 2 Drivers Championship
- Wins: 0
- Best finish: 3rd (Pro 2) in 2013

Lee Rogers (born 10 March 1972) is a race car driver; he has raced the #69 pickup since 2005 in the UK Pickup Truck Racing series.

== Notable Achievement ==
Lee was the Hot Rod Autospeed points champion in 2001 and 2002.

Career history

- 2005 - 2016 Pickup Truck Racing:
- 2013 - Pro 2 Drivers Champion
- 2013 - Team of the Year
- 2008 - Spirit of Pickup Truck Racing Award
- 2005 - Pickup Truck Racing Championship - 13th, 2nd in Rookie Championship

Pre Pickups

- 2004 Autospeed Stock Rods Overall Points Championship runner-up 2nd Overall, 2nd Taunton track championship, 2nd St. Day track championship, 2nd West of England championship, 2nd Grand National championship
- 2002 Hot Rod Autospeed points champion, 3rd Mendips Raceway points, Cornish champion
- 2001 Hot Rod Autospeed points champion, Mendips Raceway points champion, Western final runner up, Devon champion
- 1999 Hot Rod West of England runner up
- 1998 Hot Rod West of England champion
- 1997 Hot Rod Mendips Raceway Top red grade 5th overall
- 1996 Hot Rod 2nd Autospeed points championship
