= Pete Wilkinson =

Pete "Pistol" Wilkinson
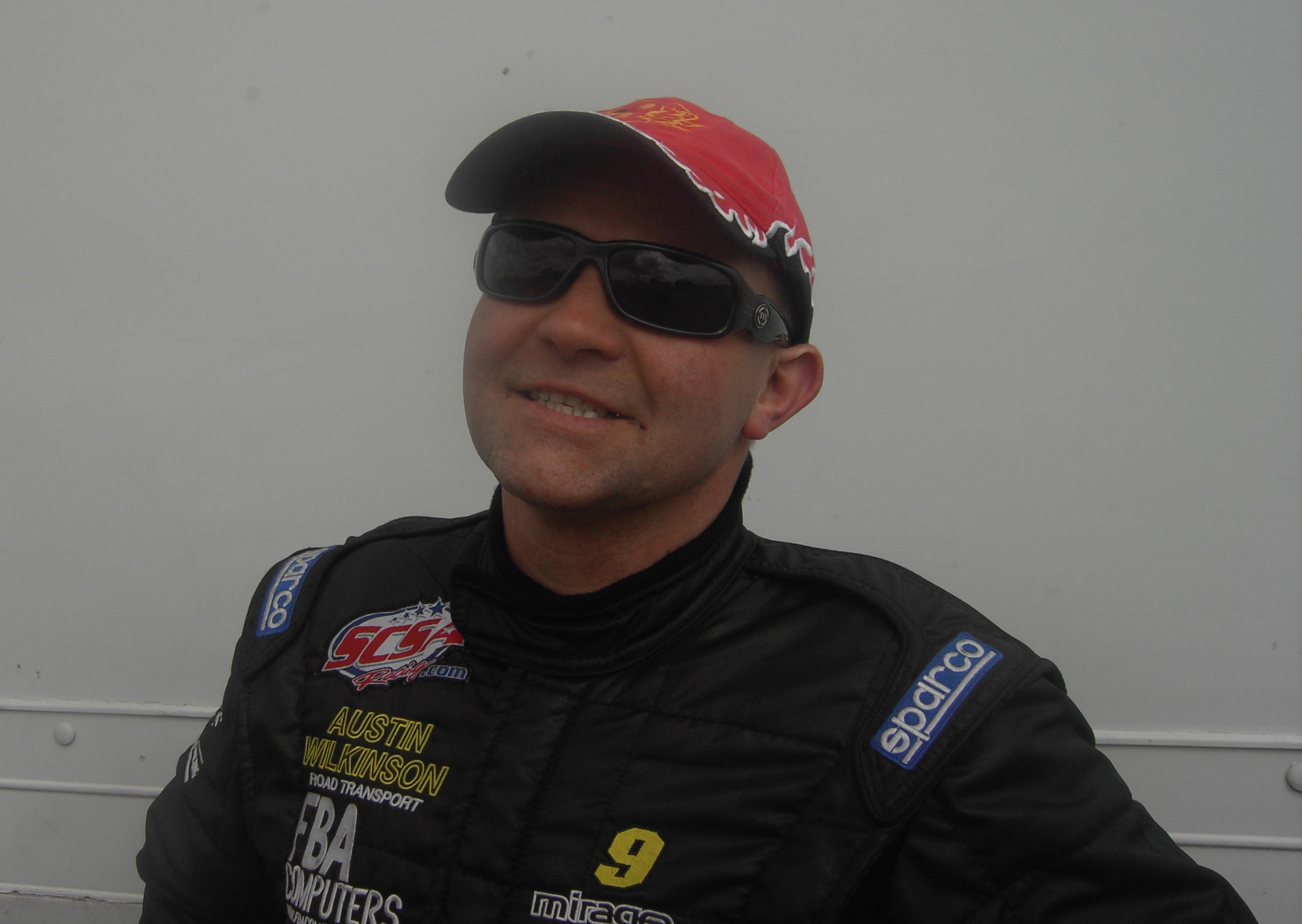
- Pete Wilkinson
- Nationality: (England) English
- Born: 7 October 1959 (age 67)
- Debut season: 1999
- Current team: Pete Wilkinson Racing
- Car number: 9
- Engine: Vauxhall C20XE
- Crew chief: Jimmy Bell
- Spotter: Neal Aberdeen
- Championships: 0
- Wins: 4
- Best finish: 1st in 2001, 2002, 2004

'Pistol' Pete Wilkinson is a former competitor in the UK Pickup Truck Racing series, and was also the occasional driver of the No. 9 Chevy Monte Carlo in the then SCSA MAC Tools V8 Trophy.

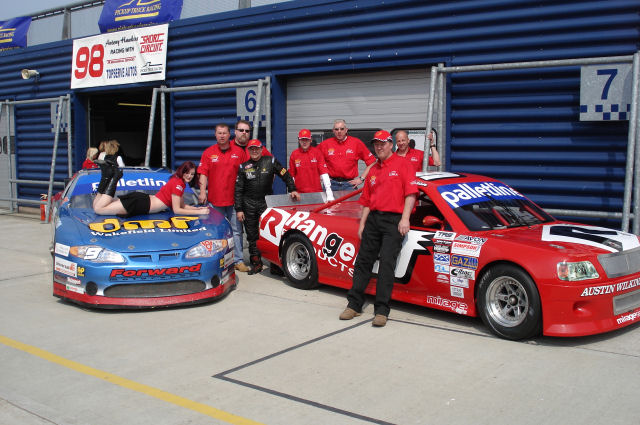
Team

== Achievement ==
In June 2007, Wilkinson became the first Pickup Truck Racing driver to pass the 20,000-point mark, on the all-time career points table. He held the title of all-time career top points scorer for several meetings before it was taken by Gavin Seager on 24 June 2007.

== Career history ==
- 2008 Pickup Truck Racing Championship – 7th
- 2007 Pickup Truck Racing Championship – 4th
- 2006 Pickup Truck Racing Championship – 8th
- 2005 Pickup Truck Racing Championship – 7th
- 2004 Pickup Truck Racing Championship – 9th – 1 race win
- 2003 Pickup Truck Racing Championship – 8th
- 2002 Pickup Truck Racing Championship – 3rd – 1 race win, 5 fastest laps
- 2001 Pickup Truck Racing Championship – 3rd – 2 race wins, 1 fastest lap
- 2000 Pickup Truck Racing Championship – 6th
- 1999 Pickup Trucks Rookie of the Year – 8th overall

Before joining the Pickup Truck Racing series, Pete raced in the XR3i championship
