= Julian Arnold =

American pickleball player (born 1991)

Julian Arnold (born 1991) is an American professional pickleball player based in Austin, Texas. He is sponsored by CnP Pickleball and is known for his signature catchphrase "Andiamo!" on the court.

== Early life and background ==
Arnold was born in 1991 in San Luis Obispo, California. He developed a passion for racket sports at a young age, playing tennis competitively throughout his youth. Arnold played NCAA Division 1 tennis at UCLA, gaining significant experience at the collegiate level.

Outside of tennis, Arnold resided in Austin, Texas after finishing college. He was introduced to pickleball in April 2021 by tennis clients and a friend who encouraged him to give the sport a try. After less than a year of playing, Arnold decided to pursue pickleball professionally.

== Professional pickleball career ==
Arnold turned professional in pickleball in 2022, signing with gear sponsor CnP Pickleball. His background in competitive tennis provided him with skills that transferred to pickleball, including technical strokes and court strategy.

Some of Arnold's notable achievements early in his professional career include:

- Silver medal in singles at the 2022 PPA Peachtree Open
- Silver medal in singles at the 2022 Nationals in Indian Wells
- MVP award at the Major League Pickleball 2023 event as part of the LA Mad Drops

Known for his competitive spirit and intensity on the court, Arnold popularized the Italian phrase "Andiamo!" which translates to "Let's go!" He often shouts it after winning crucial points in a match.

== Personal life ==
Arnold resides in Austin, Texas when he is not traveling for competitions. He is in a relationship with fellow professional pickleball player Lauren Stratman, who is also sponsored by CnP.

== See also ==
List of professional pickleball players
