= Steve Dance =

Racecar driver

Steve "Dancey" Dance
- Nationality: (England) English
- Born: 18 October 1957 (age 69)
- Debut season: 2002
- Current team: Draft Racing
- Car number: 16
- Engine: Vauxhall C20XE
- Crew chief: Robert Quinn
- Spotter: Adam Blundy
- Championships: 5
- Wins: ?
- Best finish: 1st in 2003, 2007, 2010-12
- Finished last season: 4th

Steve Dance (born 18 October 1957) is a racing driver; he has raced the #16 pickup since 2002 in the UK Pickup Truck Racing series. He won the Pickup Truck Racing championship a record five times, in the 2003, 2007, 2010, 2011, and 2012 seasons.

== Racing team ==
- Robert Quinn
- Adam Blundy
- Dean Blundy
- Kevin Dance
- Matt Dance
- Charlie Goodwin

== Career ==
Dance has been racing since he was 21 and has worked his way through different formulas winning championships along the way.

Initially, Dance started his racing career in the Super Rod formula with Speedworth International at Wimbledon and Aldershot, driving 3-liter Ford Capris. Building his cars from scratch with friends, he became known as an innovative and respected driver. Competing nationwide for points to qualify for championships, he eventually moved to 1600cc Hot Rods in 1980. During a brief period, he raced in both categories, earning the title of London Champion in both. Following this success, he went on to become the English Champion in the Hot Rods division.

In 1989, a new formula was introduced, the Intersaloons. These were similar to the Hot Rods but the engine could be as large as 2-litres. One of the main challenges that Dance was looking forward to in this series was the move from small ovals to circuits. This progression suited Dance's driving skills. He particularly enjoyed racing at Lydden Hill and in 1991 he won the championship. When in 1994, the Eurocar package was brought in it introduced a whole new concept in racing in this country. It promoted showmanship and family entertainment allowing the spectators access to the pits, the cars and the race teams. The cars were 2900cc Ford Mondeo's and as with previous formulas Dance learnt about and then built his own cars. This time it was with added help of his two nephews, Dean and Adam who had been supporting him over the seasons. Due to being involved from a young age they are as skilled as any other mechanics on the circuit. Eurocar racing introduced Dance to more new tracks like Donington, Castle Combe, Mallory Park and Brands Hatch.

In his first year, Dance raced a V6 Eurocar under the Sponsorship of Tulip Computers and came sixth in the Championship. Dance then had to leave the racing to concentrate on his business. After successfully building up a Grab Hire firm he returned to the V6's a season or two later and came fourth overall. The season after was his best Season ever, the Team worked consistently hard and achieved good results. Dance won the Eurocar V6 Championship with a meeting in hand, the first time that has been achieved in its five years history.

In 2002, a new formula came to light and after winning the V6 Championship three times in a row he was after a fresh new challenge. Dance had a test drive around Brands Hatch in a Truck and he enjoyed the experience so much that he got himself a Truck and started competing in the Championship whilst also racing in the V6.

The season was a learning curve for Dance and the Team and they gained valuable information into the running of the Truck and although it was only their first season, they came seventh overall. After such a great start, he decided to leave the V6 Championship and concentrate on the Pickup Trucks. The team decided on a name for them: Draft Racing, a colour scheme for the Pickup, a logo and all of the team clothes. They chose a brand new engine builder and decided to start from scratch and do things right, this proved a sensible idea as after all of the effort and support he won the title in 2003.

The team decided to experiment with the truck in 2004 after winning the championship to take the series on further. They learned new things, good and bad and finished the season in fourth place. The 2005 season brought new faces and new styles of racing into the formula which upped the tempo of the racing and it made the drivers want to push their trucks further. Again, he finished the season in fourth position, but did not give up. The truck was the best it had ever been but it still wasn't good enough. So during the off season, the truck was taken to different tracks and to its engine builder for progress work and the team was in a positive frame of mind for the 2006 Season. In 2010, he claimed his third championship title after fending off Pete Stevens by 68 points, and became the second driver to have won the championship three times, the other driver being Gavin Seager. At the 2011 season finale, he won the championship a record fourth time, and went on to win his fifth championship in 2012.

=== Career history ===
- 2012 Pickup Truck Champion
- 2011 Pickup Truck Champion
- 2010 Pickup Truck Champion
- 2009 Pickup Truck Championship 2nd
- 2008 Pickup Truck Championship 4th
- 2007 Pickup Truck Champion
- 2006 Pickup Truck Championship 2nd
- 2005 Pickup Truck Championship 4th
- 2004 Pickup Truck Championship 4th
- 2003 Pickup Truck Champion
- 2002 Pickup Truck Championship 7th, V Sport V6 Series 7th overall
- 2001 V Sport V6 Series Champion (23 Race wins)
- 2000 V Sport V6 Series Champion
- 1999 V Sport V6 Series Champion
- 1998 Eurocar V6 4th
- 1996 Eurocar V6 8th

Earlier Career: Hot Rod English Champion, Multiple Champion in Super Rods

== Sponsors ==
Dance is sponsored by Mountune, Grab Loader and Cartoon Network.
