= Gavin Seager =

British racing driver (born 1978)

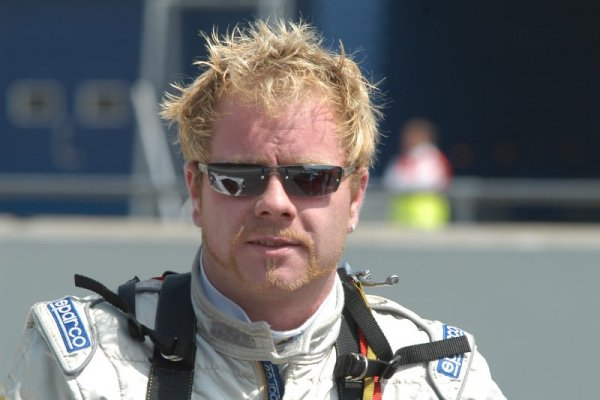
- Gavin Seager
- Nationality: British
- Born: 18 December 1978 (age 47)
- Debut season: 1998
- Car number: 54
- Engine: Vauxhall C20XE
- Crew chief: Craig 'Poodles' Slater
- Spotter: Dale Parsons
- Championships: 3
- Wins: 46
- Best finish: 1st in 2000, 2001, 2005, 2006, 2007
- Finished last season: 1st

Gavin Seager (born 18 December 1978) is a racing driver. He has won the Pickup Truck Racing championship three times; first in 2002 then in 2004 and 2008, and has also taken the runner up position twice in 2001 and 2003. On 24 June 2007, Seager became the all-time career top points scorer, taking the position away from Pete Wilkinson. Seager won the 2008 championship, making him the first driver in the series to take three overall titles. He has raced under the number 54 since 1998 in the UK Pickup Truck Racing series.

In 2012, Seager experienced prolonged depressive episodes which subsequently led to several suicide attempts. Seager faced further difficulties in 2014 when he was arrested and convicted of arson. The target was Barnards VW garage in Station Road West, Stowmarket where he caused more than £40,000 worth of damages. The blaze was started on 13 November by Seager; according to the prosecutor, the fire was started out of a "misplaced sense of loyalty" to his brother-in-law who had "a beef" with Barnards about a problem with his car not being covered by a warranty. He was given a 10-month prison sentence, suspended for 12 months, and ordered to do 80 hours unpaid work in the community.

== Career history ==
- 2008 Pickup Truck Racing Championship – won both the oval and overall championships
- 2007 Pickup Truck Racing Championship – 3rd overall, most wins and the most number of fastest laps.
- 2006 Pickup Truck Racing Championship – 6th place overall: 5 wins, 3 fastest laps (including Croft lap record)
- 2005 SCSA Stock Car Championship, runner up in rookie championship, 2 podiums
- 2005 Pickup Truck Racing – limited programme; two rounds, two wins
- 2004 Pickup Truck Racing – 4 fastest laps (Nurburgring and Oulton Park lap records)
- 2003 Pickup Truck Racing – runner up, Two fastest laps
- 2002 Pickup Truck Racing – overall champion, 4 fastest laps
- 2001 Pickup Truck Racing – runner up 3 wins, 2 fastest laps
- 2000 Pickup Truck Racing – 5th place 1 win
- 1999 Pickup Truck Racing – first full season 11th place
- 1998 Pickup Truck Racing – 1 meeting
