= Pickup Truck Racing =

- Category: Pickup truck racing
- Country: United Kingdom
- Inaugural season: 1997
- Constructors: SHP Engineering
- Engine suppliers: Vauxhall, Ford
- Drivers' champion: Steve Dance
- Official website: www.pickuptruckracing.com

Pickup Truck Racing is an auto racing series, running in the United Kingdom, including races on road courses and (historically) ovals. It was the only racing series that raced on the Oval Circuit at Rockingham Motor Speedway until it closed in 2018.

== History ==
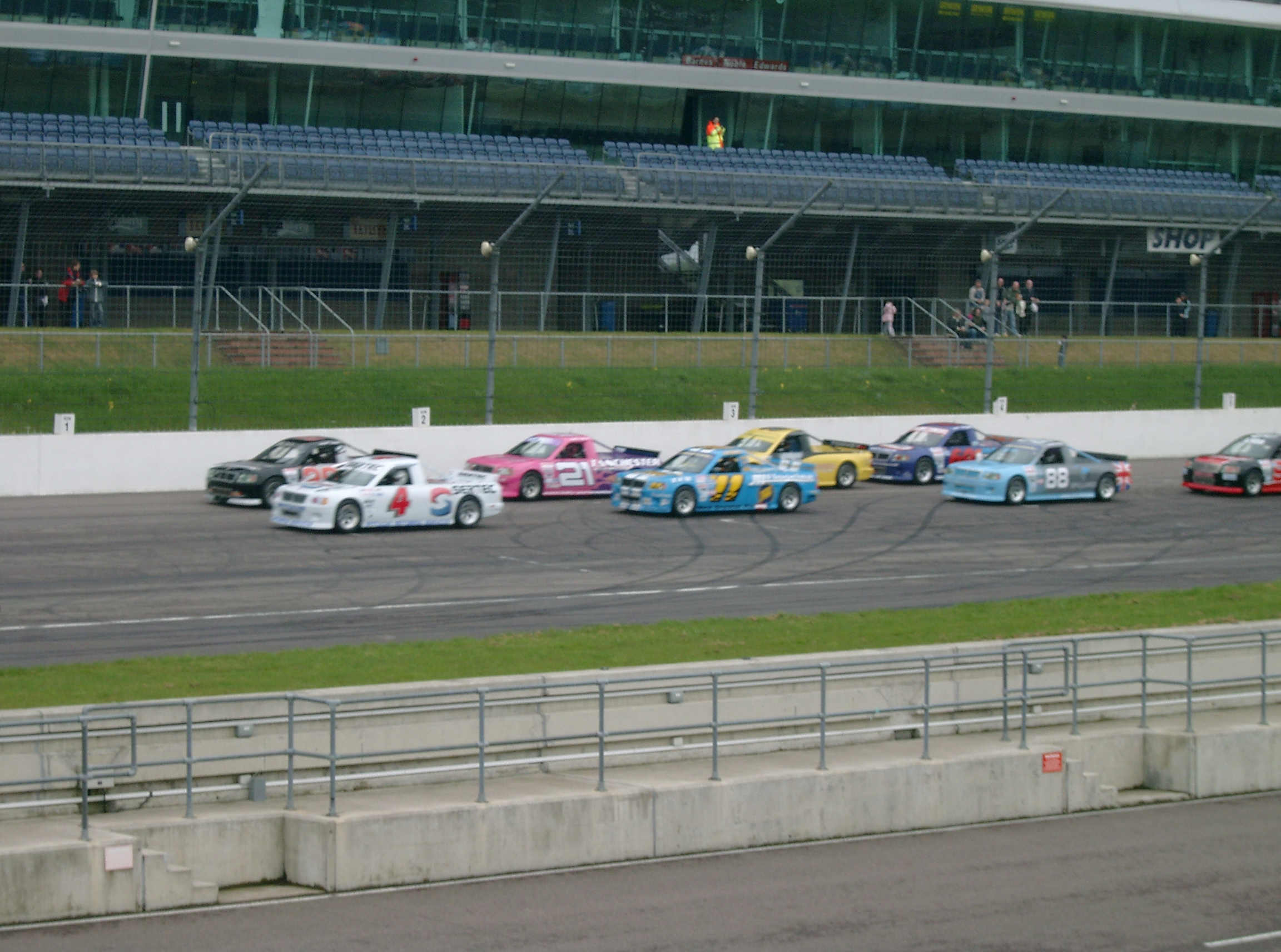
The start of a Pickup Truck race at Rockingham in 2006.

Launched in 1997 by Sonny Howard, the Pickup Truck Racing series, intended to bring the American pickup truck culture to Europe, is for purpose-built 230 bhp (170 kW) racing specials. They have a tubular space frame chassis, are powered by a 2-litre multi-valve twin-cam engine and weigh 900 kg (2,000 lb). The race trucks are designed to place an emphasis on driver ability.

In 2001, the Pickup series became the main support for the Rockingham-based oval SCSA (then called ASCAR) racing series. At this time the pickups were right hand drive in configuration and as such not permitted to race on the anti-clockwise 1.5-mile speedway. An oval course was created to allow the drivers to compete.

For the 2003 season, the pickups were converted to left hand drive and finally allowed onto the oval track, as can be seen.

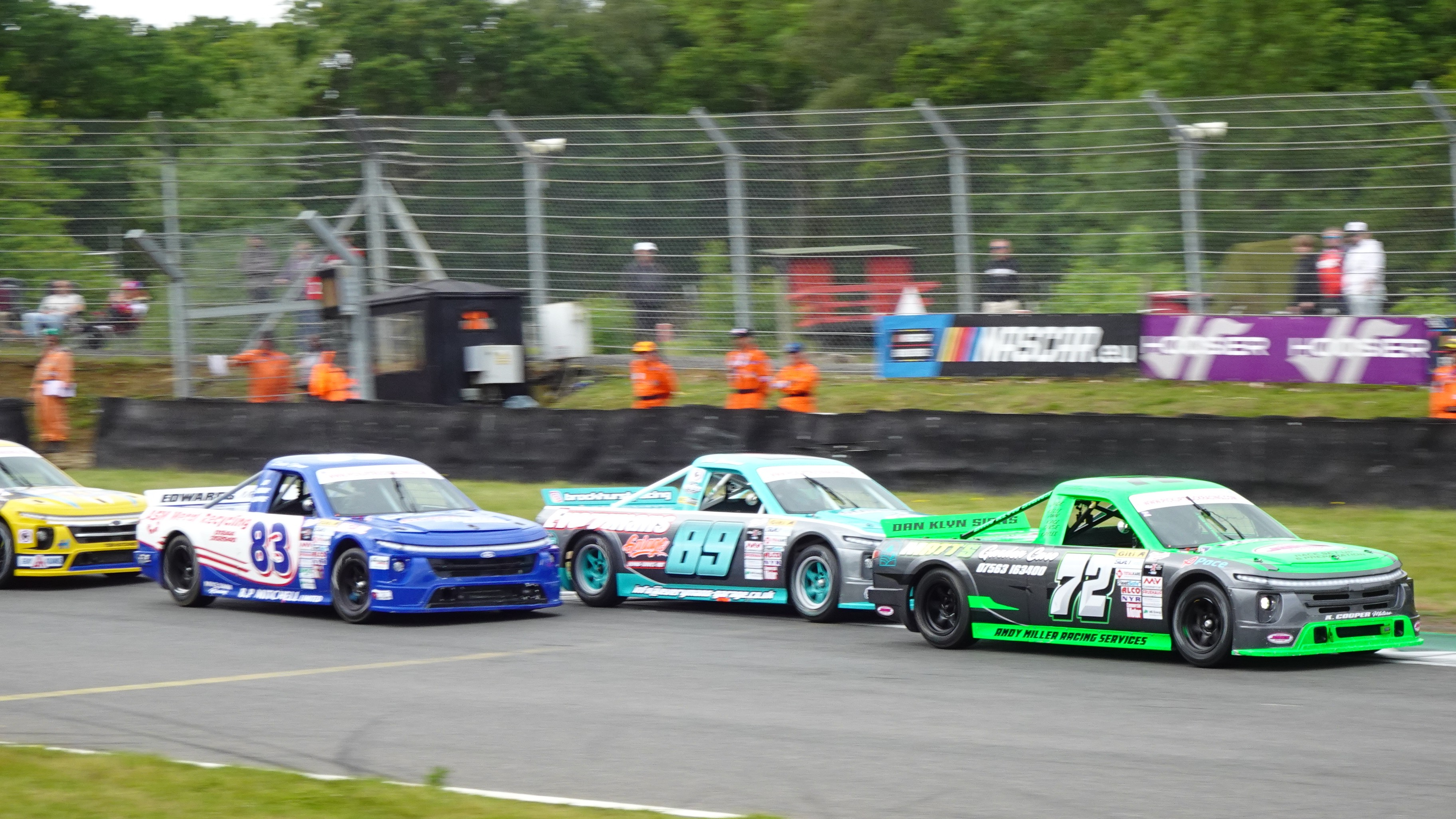
Racing action at Brands Hatch in 2026

Pickup Truck Racing is unique in 'big' oval racing, in that unlike e.g. NASCAR, the trucks have rain tyres, wipers and rear safety lights, and will race on the ovals in the wet. Speeds are about 18 mph (29 km/h) slower than when racing in fully dry conditions.

Pickup Truck Racing is also the only racing series in the UK for which no race-by-race entry fees are charged. Mallory Park continues to host oval events in the series following the closure of Rockingham Motor Speedway.

As of 2026, it has been brought under the management of the British Truck Racing Championship.

== Technical specification ==
Pickup Truck

Overview
- Manufacturer: SHP Engineering

Body and chassis
- Class: Pickup truck, Race car

Powertrain
- Engine: Vauxhall 2 litre, Ford Duratec 2.3 litre 2 litre (229 bhp)
- Transmission: Four speed manual transmission

Dimensions
- Wheelbase: 720 mm (28 in)
- Curb weight: 870 kg (1,920 lb)

Pickup Truck Racing is a single make series, and the trucks are governed by the Pickup Truck Racing regulations. The chassis is made by SHP Engineering, who are also responsible for the vehicle used in T Cars, a series for young drivers.

The main flexibility in the regulations comes in the choice of engine. From 2011 the trucks could be fitted with either a Vauxhall petrol injected 2-litre red top engine or a Ford Duratec engine, both of which are four-cylinder engines with a 2-litre capacity and 16 valves.

In 2010, the front end of the pickup trucks was changed with the choice of either an Isuzu Denver Max LE or a Ford Ranger front. Later in the year a Vauxhall front was then also introduced to the championship.

== 2017 race dates ==
Date	Track
25 & 26 March	Brands Hatch
8 & 9 April	Rockingham
22 & 23 April	Pembrey
13 & 14 May	Rockingham
10 & 11 June	Brands Hatch
1 & 2 July	Rockingham
22 & 23 July	Donington Park
9 & 10 September	Snetterton
30 Sep & 1 Oct	Rockingham
4 & 5 November	Brands Hatch

== Race format ==
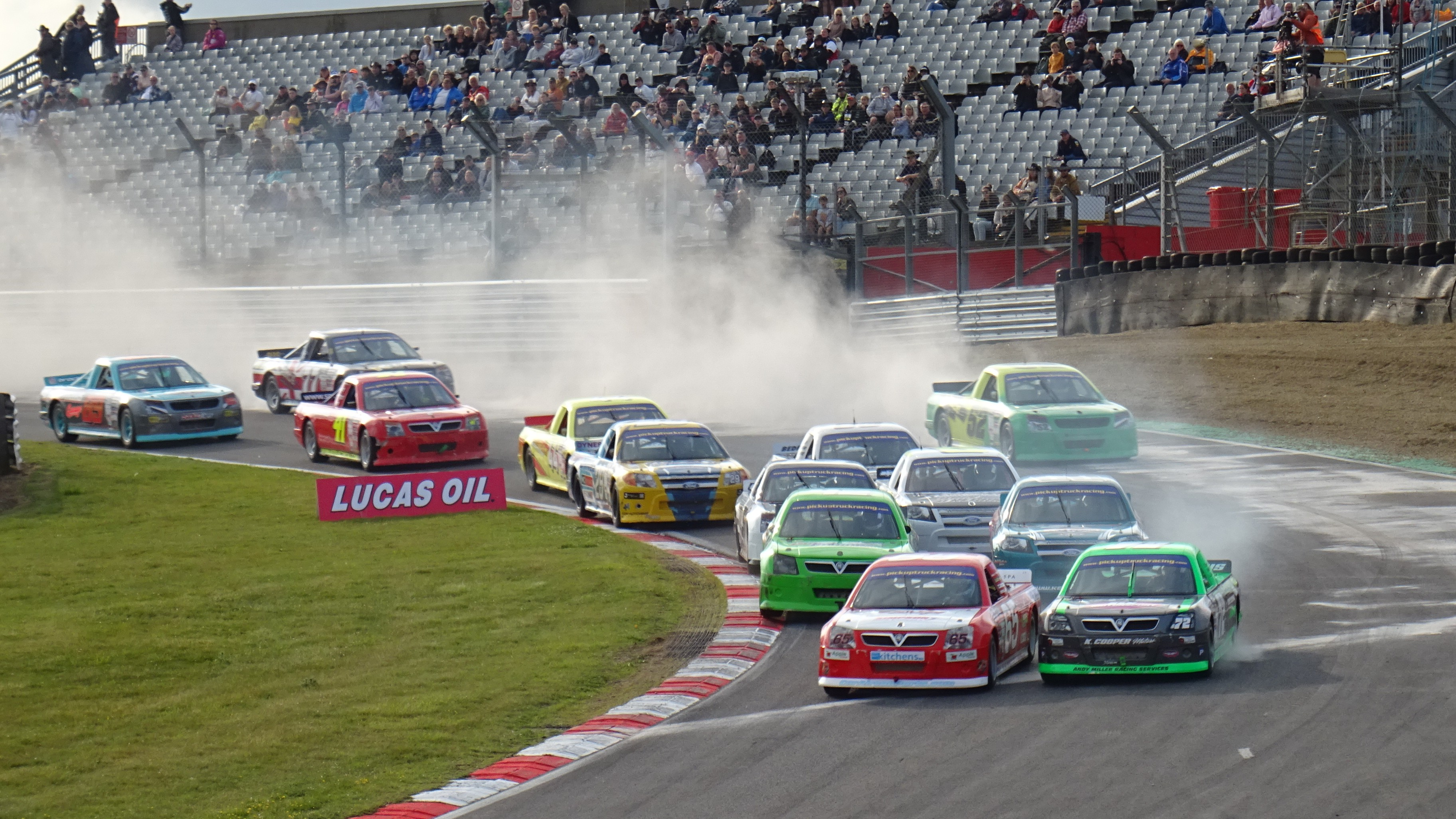
The start of a race at Brands Hatch in 2025

Under normal circumstances race weekends follow the traditional format of practice and qualifying on the Saturday, and two races on Sunday. Qualifying is used to shake the car down and work on the setup, and to meet the MSA requirements for race entry of three qualifying laps, and not to set the starting grid.

The grid is set by reversing the top ten qualifiers (whoever qualifies 10th will be on pole, and whoever qualifies 1st will start from 10th). The top ten qualifiers also receive points, starting from 20 and decreasing by two for every place until 10th place, after which drivers receive zero points. Rookies always start from the rear of the grid as do competitors who have broken seals on controlled components such as differentials. Drivers can also elect to start from the back should they wish to do so.

At some circuits, qualifying takes place on Saturday morning, with the first race on Saturday afternoon and the second on Sunday.

== Previous seasons ==
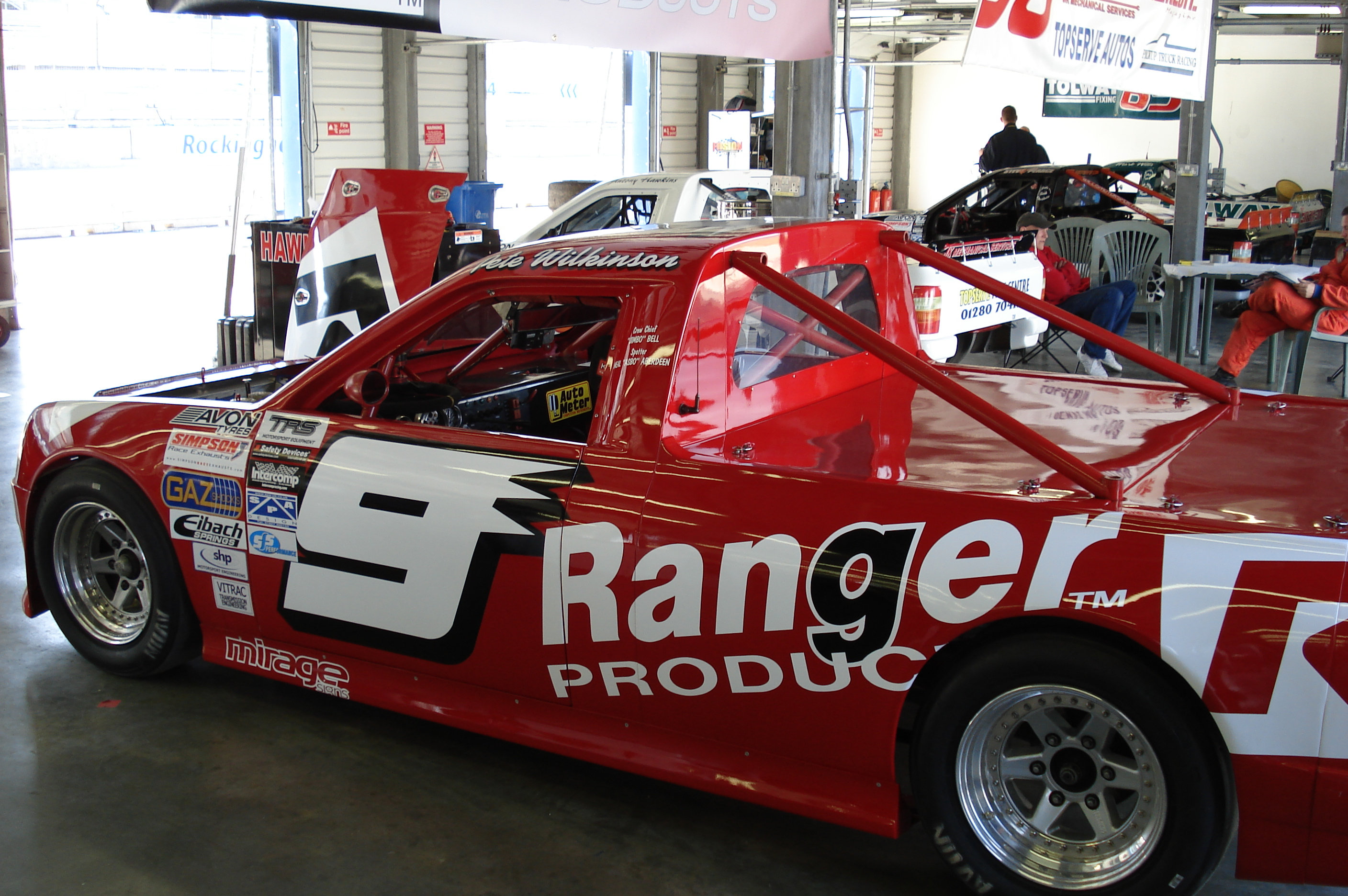
Pete Wilkinson's pickup being prepared for the first 2007 race

For the 2009 season, races took place on weekends between March and November. There were racing weekends at six different circuits; the majority of the races were held at Rockingham Motor Speedway but others were held at Brands Hatch, Thruxton, Silverstone, Pembrey, Donington Park and Oulton Park. Each round comprised two races, making a twenty-two round competition in total.

2009 saw a number of rule changes:

Qualifying

One qualifying session was held, split into two sections. The fastest ten drivers in the first session made up the first ten places on the grid, but in reverse qualification order. The second session was the same, but for race two.

Success ballast

The podium finishers in each race were subject to the application of success ballast as follows:

1st: 30 kg 2nd: 20 kg 3rd: 10 kg

Ballast was applied up to a maximum of 70 kg. 10 kg was removed each time a truck finished outside of the top three.

Sprint/feature races

Two events hosted a Sprint/Feature race format, one at Rockingham and one at a road course.

The series continued to operate two championships: the Oval Championship and the Overall Championship.

== Previous champions ==
Note: 1997 was the inaugural year and as such, races were not part of a championship.

Year	Overall Champion	Oval Champion	Top Rookie
2022	Reece Jones	George Turuccki	
2020	n/a covid		
2019	George Turricki	George Turricki	Simon Ward
2018	Scott Bourne	Paul Tompkins	Dale Gent
2017	Scott Bourne		
2016	Freddie Lee		
2015	Michael Smith	michael smith	
2014	Michael Smith	michael smith	
2013	Antony Hawkins	Nic Grindrod	
2012	Steve Dance	Phil White	Paul Jones
2011	Steve Dance	Steve Dance	Paul Tompkins
2010	Steve Dance	Nic Grindrod	Charlie Weaver
2009	Pete Stevens	Pete Stevens	Greg Wood
2008	Gavin Seager	Gavin Seager	n/a
2007	Steve Dance	Paul Poulter	Neil Tressler
2006	Nic Grindrod	Nic Grindrod	John Stant
2005	Nic Grindrod	Paul Poulter	Paul Poulter
2004	Gavin Seager	Mark Willis	Martin Heath
2003	Steve Dance	Steve Dance	Mark Willis
2002	Gavin Seager	n/a	Nic Grindrod
2001	Lee Caroline	n/a	Davy Philp
2000	Lee Caroline	n/a	Phil White
1999	Kevin Clarke	n/a	Pete Wilkinson
1998	Jeff Simpson	n/a	n/a

== Points system ==
1st	2nd	3rd	4th	5th	6th	7th	8th	9th	10th	11th	12th	13th	14th	15th	16th	17th	18th	19th	20th
200	195	190	185	180	175	170	165	160	155	150	145	140	135	130	125	120	115	110	105
21st	22nd	23rd	24th	25th	26th	27th	28th	29th	30th	31st	32nd	33rd							
100	95	90	85	80	75	70	65	60	55	50	45	40							

Any other classified finishers receive 20 points and any non-finishers receive 10 points except in the case of disqualification.
