= 2001 ASCAR season =

2001 ASCAR

Seasons
- ← none 2002 →

The 2001 ASCAR season was the inaugural season of United Kingdom-based NASCAR style stock car racing, originally known as ASCAR.

== Teams and drivers ==
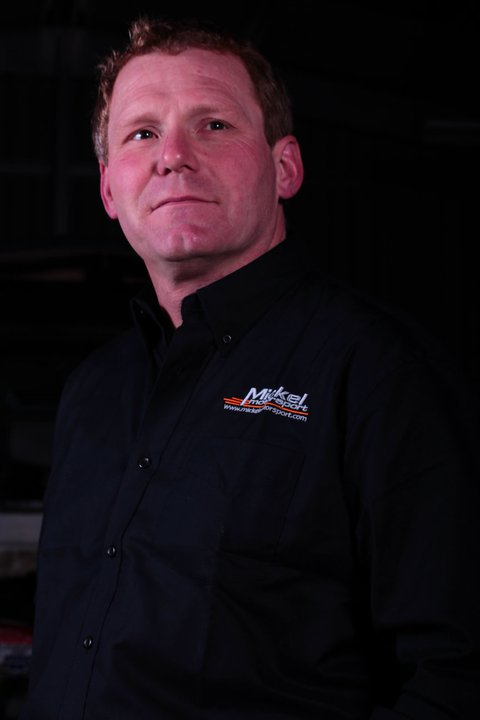
2001 Champion John Mickel.

Team	Car	No.	Driver	Rounds
Team West-Tec	Chevrolet	2	(United States) Mark Claussner	WD
Team West-Tec	Chevrolet	2	(United Kingdom) Amanda Stretton	All
Team West-Tec	Ford	3	(Netherlands) Michael Vergers	All
Team West-Tec	Chevrolet	69	(United Kingdom) Anthony Swan	1
Team West-Tec	Chevrolet	99	(United Kingdom) Mike Jordan	WD
Team West-Tec	Chevrolet	99	(United Kingdom) Neil Cunningham	2
Team West-Tec	Chevrolet	99	(United Kingdom) Anthony Swan	1
Colin Blower Motorsport	Chevrolet	4	(United Kingdom) Tiff Needell	WD
Colin Blower Motorsport	Chevrolet	4	(United Kingdom) Henry Taylor	All
Colin Blower Motorsport	Chevrolet	5	(United Kingdom) Steve Hitchins	2
Colin Blower Motorsport	Chevrolet	5	(United Kingdom) Rob Speak	1
Colin Blower Motorsport	Chevrolet	43	(United Kingdom) Colin Blower	2
Colin Blower Motorsport	Chevrolet	43	(United Kingdom) Chris Goodwin	1
Team Catchpole	Chevrolet	7	(United Kingdom) Justin Foley	WD
Team Catchpole	Chevrolet	77	(United Kingdom) Phil Weaver	All
Cleland Speedsport	Chevrolet	8	(United Kingdom) John Cleland	WD
Cleland Speedsport	Chevrolet	28	(United Kingdom) John Dalziel	WD
Oughtred & Harrison	Ford	12	(United Kingdom) Mark Proctor	All
Shearspeed	Pontiac	18	(United Kingdom) Paul Sheard	All
Streber Motorsport	Pontiac	22	(United Kingdom) Mark Preston	WD
TorqueSpeed	Chevrolet	24	(United Kingdom) John Mickel	All
Dudman Motorsport	Chevrolet	33	(United Kingdom) Steve Dudman	All
Lee Caroline Racing	Ford	38	(United Kingdom) Lee Caroline	All
Steward Racing	Chevrolet	75	(United Kingdom) John Steward	All
CWS Racing	Chevrolet	78	(United Kingdom) Colin White	All
Michael Smith Racing	Chevrolet	93	(United Kingdom) Michael Smith	WD
TJ Motorsport	Ford	96	(United States) Mark Claussner	All
TJ Motorsport	Ford	111	(New Zealand) Aaron Slight	1

== Race calendar ==
The season had intended to run at Knockhill, Mondello Park and the EuroSpeedway as well as the Rockingham Motor Speedway but fuel pickup issues during the inaugural race in May caused that race to be discounted from the championship and the season was postponed and cut back to just five races at three meetings all at Rockingham.

Round	Circuit/Location	Date	Pole position	Fastest lap	Led most laps	Winning driver	Winning team
NC	(United Kingdom) Rockingham Motor Speedway	26 May	(United Kingdom) John Cleland	(United Kingdom) Mark Proctor	(United Kingdom) Colin White	(United Kingdom) John Cleland	(United Kingdom) Cleland Speedsport
NC	(United Kingdom) Knockhill Racing Circuit	17 June	Meetings cancelled				
NC	(Germany) EuroSpeedway	15 July	Meetings cancelled				
NC	(United Kingdom) Rockingham Motor Speedway	29 July	Meetings cancelled				
NC	(Republic of Ireland) Mondello Park	12 August	Meetings cancelled				
R1	(United Kingdom) Rockingham Motor Speedway	26 August	(Netherlands) Michael Vergers		(United Kingdom) John Mickel	(United Kingdom) John Mickel	(United Kingdom) TorqueSpeed
R2	(United Kingdom) Rockingham Motor Speedway	26 August	(United Kingdom) John Mickel		(Netherlands) Michael Vergers	(Netherlands) Michael Vergers	(United Kingdom) Team West-Tec
NC	(Germany) EuroSpeedway	15 September	Meeting cancelled				
R3	(United Kingdom) Rockingham Motor Speedway	22 September				(Netherlands) Michael Vergers	(United Kingdom) Team West-Tec
R4	(United Kingdom) Rockingham Motor Speedway	7 October	(Netherlands) John Mickel	(Netherlands) Michael Vergers	(Netherlands) Michael Vergers	(Netherlands) Michael Vergers	(United Kingdom) Team West-Tec
R5	(United Kingdom) Rockingham Motor Speedway	7 October	(Netherlands) Michael Vergers	(United Kingdom) John Mickel	(Netherlands) Michael Vergers	(United Kingdom) John Mickel	(United Kingdom) TorqueSpeed

== Final points standings ==
Pos	Driver	(United Kingdom)		(United Kingdom)	(United Kingdom)		Pts
Pos	Driver	R1	R2	R3	R4	R5	Pts
1	(United Kingdom) John Mickel	1	2	2	2	1	860
2	(United Kingdom) Colin White	5	3	15	3	3	760
3	(United Kingdom) Lee Caroline	3	4	13	4	13	721
4	(United Kingdom) John Steward	4	11	10	6	7	711
5	(United Kingdom) Paul Sheard	8	6	11	9	5	706
6	(Netherlands) Michael Vergers	2	1	1	1	DSQ	695
7	(United Kingdom) Amanda Stretton	9	7	7	10	11	676
8	(United States) Mark Claussner	16	5	6	7	12	668
9	(United Kingdom) Henry Taylor	6	12	14	14	10	640
10	(United Kingdom) Mark Proctor	11	DNS	4	5	2	611
11	(United Kingdom) Phil Weaver	12	DNS	8	11	8	528
12	(United Kingdom) Steve Dudman	13	DNS	16	15	9	479
13	(United Kingdom) Steve Hitchins	7	8	12			407
14	(United Kingdom) Colin Blower	10	9	9			400
15	(United Kingdom) Neil Cunningham	15	10	5			395
16	(United Kingdom) Rob Speak				13	4	278
17	(United Kingdom) Chris Goodwin				12	6	272
18	(United Kingdom) Anthony Swan	14	13		8	DNS	232
19	(New Zealand) Aaron Slight			3			165
