= 2005 SCSA season =

British car racing season

2005 SCSA

Seasons
- ← 2004 2006 →

The 2005 SCSA Season was the fifth season of United Kingdom-based NASCAR style stock car racing, originally known as ASCAR. From this season, 'Stock Car Speed Association' was adopted as the new brand of the series.

== Teams and drivers ==
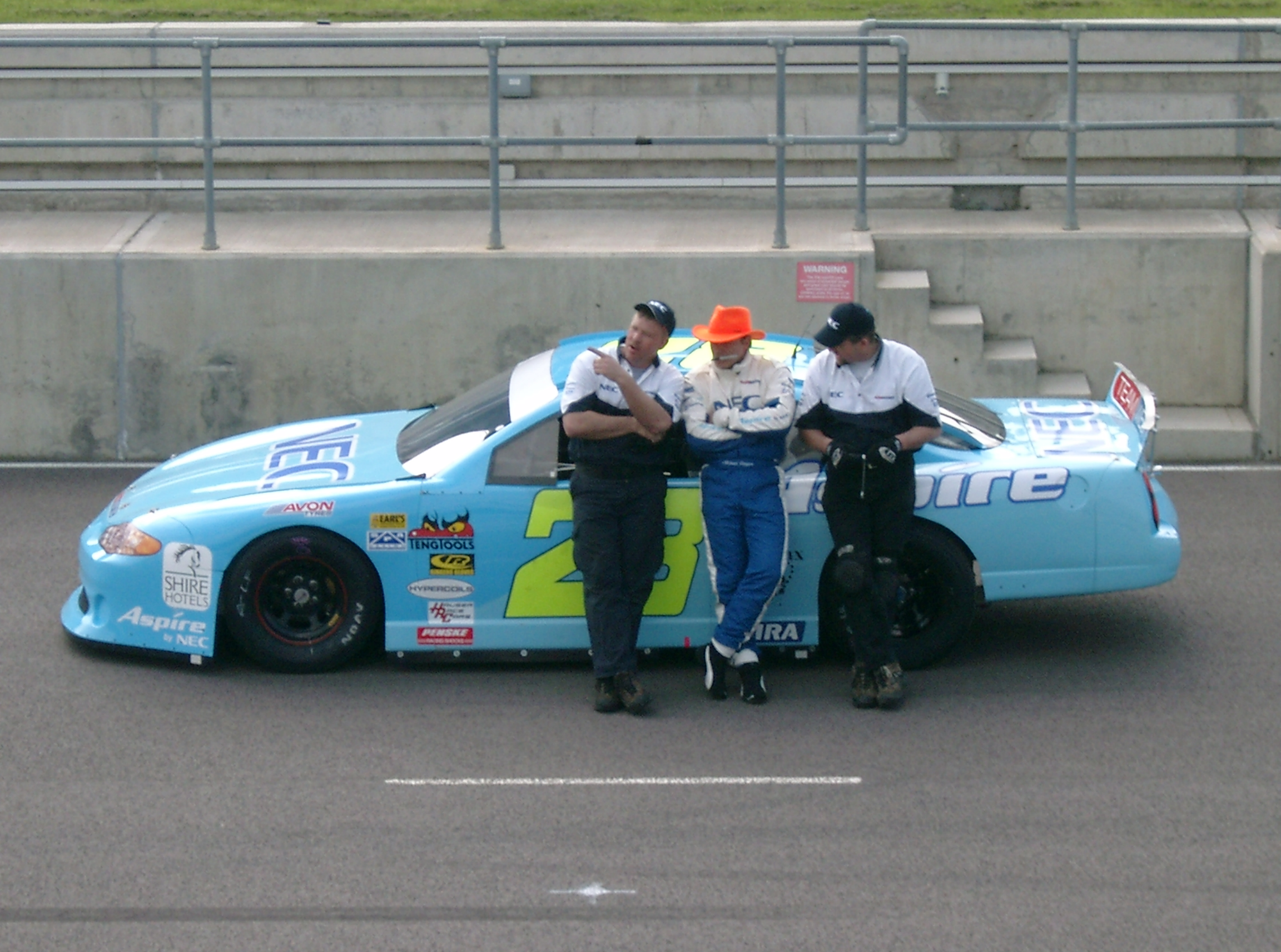
2005 Champion Michael Vergers.

Team	Car	No.	Driver	Rounds
Kidd-Richardson Racing	Chevrolet	2	(Australia) Shaun Richardson	All
Kidd-Richardson Racing	Chevrolet	97	(United Kingdom) Gavin Seager	All
Kraco Racing	Chevrolet	4	(United Kingdom) Adam Jackson	All
24:7 Motorsport	Chevrolet	7	(United Kingdom) Mike Luck	All
Team West-Tec	Pontiac	8	(United Kingdom) Stuart Gough	1
Team West-Tec	Pontiac	17	(United Kingdom) Tony King	All
Team West-Tec	Pontiac	28	(Netherlands) Michael Vergers	All
Team West-Tec	Pontiac	88	(United Kingdom) Oli Playle	All
MyOwnRaceTeam	Pontiac	11	(United Kingdom) 'Skid Carrera'	2
Fast Tec Motorsport	Pontiac	12	(United Kingdom) Mark Proctor	2
TorqueSpeed	Chevrolet	24	(United Kingdom) Stevie Hodgson	All
TorqueSpeed	Chevrolet	25	(United Kingdom) Ian McKellar Jr.	All
TorqueSpeed	Chevrolet	26	(United Kingdom) Hunter Abbott	All
TorqueSpeed	Ford	66	(United Kingdom) John Mickel	All
Team Catchpole Racing	Chevrolet	31	(United Kingdom) Duncan Gray	2
Team Catchpole Racing	Chevrolet	77	(United Kingdom) Phil Weaver	All
CWS Racing	Pontiac	38	(United Kingdom) Keith White	1
CWS Racing	Chevrolet	78	(United Kingdom) Colin White	All
CWS Racing	Chevrolet	85	(United Kingdom) Keith White	3
CWS Racing	Chevrolet	85	(United Kingdom) Shane Brereton	1
CWS Racing	Chevrolet	85	(United Kingdom) Mark Proctor	1
CWS Racing	Chevrolet	85	(Republic of Ireland) Malcolm Clein	1
Team TorTrucks	Ford; Pontiac	48	(United Kingdom) Shane Brereton	5
Steward Racing	Ford	75	(United Kingdom) John Steward	All

== Race calendar ==
All races were held at the Rockingham Motor Speedway in Corby, Northamptonshire.

The season consisted of six meetings of two races taking place on the first Sunday of each month from May to October. The grid for the opening race of each meeting was set by a qualifying session with the second race grid being set by the finishing order of the first.

A meeting at the EuroSpeedway in Germany was scheduled for late August but was cancelled due to concerns with travel costs.

Round		Date	Pole position	Fastest lap	Led most laps	Winning driver	Winning team
1	R1	1 May	(United Kingdom) Stevie Hodgson	(United Kingdom) Stevie Hodgson	(United Kingdom) Stevie Hodgson	(United Kingdom) Stevie Hodgson	(United Kingdom) TorqueSpeed
1	R2	1 May		(United Kingdom) John Mickel	(United Kingdom) John Mickel	(United Kingdom) John Mickel	(United Kingdom) TorqueSpeed
2	R3	5 June	(Netherlands) Michael Vergers	(Netherlands) Michael Vergers	(Netherlands) Michael Vergers	(United Kingdom) John Mickel	(United Kingdom) TorqueSpeed
2	R4	5 June		(Netherlands) Michael Vergers	(Netherlands) Michael Vergers	(Netherlands) Michael Vergers	(United Kingdom) Team West-Tec
3	R5	3 July	(United Kingdom) Ian McKellar Jr.	(United Kingdom) Ian McKellar Jr.	(United Kingdom) Ian McKellar Jr.	(United Kingdom) Ian McKellar Jr.	(United Kingdom) TorqueSpeed
3	R6	3 July		(United Kingdom) Stevie Hodgson	(United Kingdom) Ian McKellar Jr.	(United Kingdom) Ian McKellar Jr.	(United Kingdom) TorqueSpeed
4	R7	7 August	(Netherlands) Michael Vergers	(United Kingdom) John Mickel	(United Kingdom) Stevie Hodgson	(United Kingdom) John Mickel	(United Kingdom) TorqueSpeed
4	R8	7 August		(United Kingdom) Ian McKellar Jr.	(Netherlands) Michael Vergers	(Netherlands) Michael Vergers	(United Kingdom) Team West-Tec
5	R9	4 September	(United Kingdom) Stevie Hodgson	(United Kingdom) Ian McKellar Jr.	(United Kingdom) Ian McKellar Jr.	(United Kingdom) Ian McKellar Jr.	(United Kingdom) TorqueSpeed
5	R10	4 September		(Netherlands) Michael Vergers	(United Kingdom) Ian McKellar Jr.	(United Kingdom) Ian McKellar Jr.	(United Kingdom) TorqueSpeed
6	R11	2 October	(United Kingdom) John Steward	(United Kingdom) Oli Playle	(United Kingdom) Oli Playle	(United Kingdom) Oli Playle	(United Kingdom) Team West-Tec
6	R12	2 October		(United Kingdom) John Mickel	(United Kingdom) Oli Playle	(Netherlands) Michael Vergers	(United Kingdom) Team West-Tec

== Final points standings ==
The 2005 season saw a change in the points system. Rather than every driver taking the start of the race being eligible for full points as before, now only those that complete at least 60% distance and are running at the end of the race get full points for their finishing position. Anyone that completes less than 60% race distance scores 10 points as long as they take the start and are not excluded from the final result.

Pos	Driver	R1	R2	R3	R4	R5	R6	R7	R8	R9	R10	R11	R12	Pts
1	(Netherlands) Michael Vergers	3	3	2*	1*	8	6*	2*	1*	3	2*	11	1*	2245
2	(United Kingdom) Stevie Hodgson	1*	2*	4	7*	3	2*	3*	3	2*	7*	6	7	2225
3	(United Kingdom) Colin White	4	10	6*	8	6	8	8	4	4	4	2	11	2085
4	(United Kingdom) John Mickel	2*	1*	1*	2*	2*	3	1*	10	13	13	4*	2	2045
5	(United Kingdom) Ian McKellar Jr.	7	5	11	3	1*	1*	10	2	1*	1*	5*	15	2030
6	(Australia) Shaun Richardson	13	7	7	4	7	7	6	6	8	9	8	4	1900
7	(United Kingdom) Oli Playle	14	15	5	12	4	5	4	15	7*	5	1*	13*	1460
8	(United Kingdom) Hunter Abbott	6	14	3	11	5	4	11	12	6	3	13	12	1420
9	(United Kingdom) Gavin Seager	16	DNS	10	5	14	9	12	13	10	10	3*	3	1350
10	(United Kingdom) John Steward	5	4	12	DNS	15	DNS	5	5	5	8	15	10	1255
11	(United Kingdom) Mike Luck	8	8	8	6	11	14	7	7	15	DNS	DNS	DNS	1180
12	(United Kingdom) Phil Weaver	12	13	9	9	13	13	13	11	9	12	DNS	DNS	1080
13	(United Kingdom) Tony King	17	12	13	DNS	10	12	15	DNS	11	6	7	14	980
14	(United Kingdom) Adam Jackson	9	6	15	13	16	16	16	16	14	11	9	5	865
15	(United Kingdom) Keith White	14	11			DNS	11	DNS	8			12	8	785
16	(United Kingdom) Shane Brereton	18	DNS	DNS	10	12	15	14	DNS	12	14	14	9	655
17	(United Kingdom) Mark Proctor	11	9			9	10			DNS	DNS			625
18	(Republic of Ireland) Malcolm Clein											10	6	330
19	(United Kingdom) Duncan Gray	10	16	14	DNS									175
20	(United Kingdom) 'Skid Carrera'							9*	14	16	DNS			170
21	(United Kingdom) Stuart Gough							DNS	9					160
