= 2002 ASCAR season =

2002 ASCAR

Seasons
- ← 2001 2003 →

The 2002 ASCAR season was the second season of United Kingdom-based NASCAR style stock car racing, originally known as ASCAR.

== Teams and drivers ==
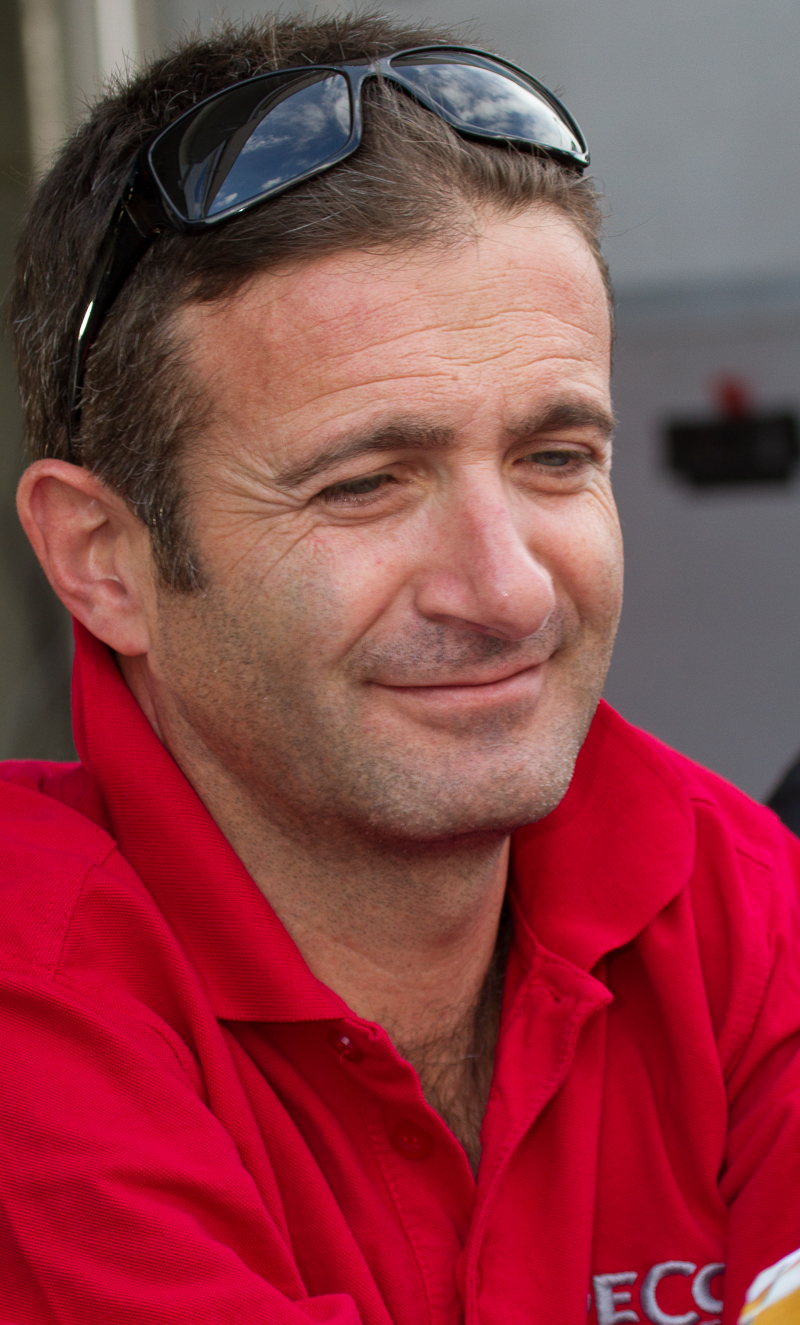
2002 Champion Nicolas Minassian.

Team	Car	No.	Driver	Rounds
Shear-Speed	Pontiac	3	(United Kingdom) Anthony Swan	1
Shear-Speed	Pontiac	3	(United Kingdom) Paul Sheard	1
Shear-Speed	Pontiac	18	(United Kingdom) Paul Sheard	2
Shear-Speed	Pontiac	58	(United Kingdom) Tom Guinchard	1
Shear-Speed	Pontiac	68	(Germany) Roland Rehfeld	4
Shear-Speed	Pontiac	68	(United Kingdom) Paul Sheard	1
Shear-Speed	Pontiac	68	(United Kingdom) Colin White	1
Shear-Speed	Pontiac	88	(United Kingdom) Lee O'Keefe	5
Shear-Speed	Pontiac	88	(Australia) Chris Robinson	1
Colin Blower Motorsport	Chevrolet	5	(United Kingdom) Rob Speak	7
Hodgson Motorsport	Chevrolet; Pontiac	6	(United Kingdom) Stevie Hodgson	All
Hodgson Motorsport	Chevrolet; Pontiac	55	(United Kingdom) Kevin McGarrity	3
RML	Chevrolet	7	(United Kingdom) Kelvin Burt	All
RML	Chevrolet	8	(France) Nicolas Minassian	All
Fast Tec Motorsport	Ford	11	(United Kingdom) Paul Evans	1
Fast Tec Motorsport	Ford	11	(United Kingdom) Lee Fitzpatrick	1
Fast Tec Motorsport	Ford	11	(Australia) Shaun Richardson	1
Fast Tec Motorsport	Ford	11	(United Kingdom) Ben Collins	1
Fast Tec Motorsport	Ford	11	(United Kingdom) Paula Cook	1
Fast Tec Motorsport	Ford	12	(United Kingdom) Mark Proctor	All
TorqueSpeed	Chevrolet	24	(United Kingdom) John Mickel	6
Team West-Tec	Chevrolet	28	(United Kingdom) Anthony Swan	7
Team West-Tec	Ford	96	(United States) Mark Claussner	1
Team West-Tec	Ford	96	(Germany) Roland Rehfeld	4
Deuce Racing	Chevrolet	48	(United Kingdom) Peter Storm	3
Deuce Racing	Chevrolet	48	(United Kingdom) Ian McKellar Jr.	1
Deuce Racing	Chevrolet	48	(United Kingdom) Kevin McGarrity	1
Deuce Racing	Chevrolet	48	(United States) Randy Tolsma	1
Deuce Racing	Chevrolet	48	(United States) Brandon Whitt	1
Deuce Racing	Chevrolet	84	(South Africa) Toby Scheckter	3
Deuce Racing	Chevrolet	84	(United Kingdom) Derek Hayes	4
Xcel Motorsport	Ford	67	(United Kingdom) Darren Manning	6
Xcel Motorsport	Ford	67	(United Kingdom) Colin McRae	1
Xcel Motorsport	Ford	67	(United Kingdom) Matt Neal	1
Xcel Motorsport	Ford	76	(United Kingdom) Jason Plato	All
Team HTML	Pontiac	69	(United Kingdom) Darren Turner	All
Steward Racing	Ford	75	(United Kingdom) John Steward	6
Team Catchpole Racing	Chevrolet	77	(United Kingdom) Phil Weaver	7
CWS Racing	Chevrolet	78	(United Kingdom) Colin White	All

== Race calendar ==
The season consisted of eight meetings with either two or three races taking place at each. The grid for the opening race of each meeting was set by a qualifying session with the second race grid being set by the finishing order of the first. Two meetings were held at the EuroSpeedway in Germany with the remaining six at the Rockingham Motor Speedway in the United Kingdom.

Round		Circuit/Location	Date	Pole position	Fastest lap	Led most laps	Winning driver	Winning team
1	R1	(United Kingdom) Rockingham Motor Speedway	5 May	(United Kingdom) Darren Manning	(United Kingdom) Stevie Hodgson	(United Kingdom) Colin White	(United Kingdom) Colin White	(United Kingdom) CWS Racing
1	R2	(United Kingdom) Rockingham Motor Speedway	5 May		(France) Nicolas Minassian	(France) Nicolas Minassian	(France) Nicolas Minassian	(United Kingdom) RML
2	R3	(Germany) EuroSpeedway	25 May	(United Kingdom) Kelvin Burt	(United Kingdom) Colin White	(United Kingdom) Stevie Hodgson	(United Kingdom) Colin White	(United Kingdom) CWS Racing
2	R4	(Germany) EuroSpeedway	26 May	Cancelled due to rain				
2	R5	(Germany) EuroSpeedway	26 May	Cancelled due to rain				
3	R6	(United Kingdom) Rockingham Motor Speedway	8 June	(United Kingdom) Colin White	(United Kingdom) Darren Turner	(France) Nicolas Minassian	(United Kingdom) Darren Turner	(United Kingdom) Team HTML
3	R7	(United Kingdom) Rockingham Motor Speedway	9 June	Cancelled due to rain				
3	R8	(United Kingdom) Rockingham Motor Speedway	9 June	Cancelled due to rain				
4	R9	(Germany) EuroSpeedway	20 July	(United Kingdom) Darren Turner	(United Kingdom) Darren Turner	(United Kingdom) Darren Turner	(United Kingdom) Darren Turner	(United Kingdom) Team HTML
4	R10	(Germany) EuroSpeedway	21 July		(United Kingdom) Darren Turner	(United Kingdom) Darren Turner	(United Kingdom) Darren Turner	(United Kingdom) Team HTML
4	R11	(Germany) EuroSpeedway	21 July		(France) Nicolas Minassian	(United Kingdom) Darren Manning	(United Kingdom) Darren Manning	(United Kingdom) Xcel Motorsport
5	R12	(United Kingdom) Rockingham Motor Speedway	4 August	(United Kingdom) Darren Turner	(United Kingdom) Darren Turner	(France) Nicolas Minassian	(United Kingdom) Darren Turner	(United Kingdom) Team HTML
5	R13	(United Kingdom) Rockingham Motor Speedway	4 August		(United Kingdom) Darren Turner	(United Kingdom) Darren Turner	(United Kingdom) Darren Turner	(United Kingdom) Team HTML
6	R14	(United Kingdom) Rockingham Motor Speedway	24 August	(United Kingdom) Darren Turner	(United Kingdom) Kelvin Burt	(United Kingdom) Kelvin Burt	(United Kingdom) Kelvin Burt	(United Kingdom) RML
6	R15	(United Kingdom) Rockingham Motor Speedway	25 August		(United Kingdom) Kelvin Burt	(United Kingdom) Kelvin Burt	(United Kingdom) Kelvin Burt	(United Kingdom) RML
6	R16	(United Kingdom) Rockingham Motor Speedway	25 August		(United Kingdom) Kelvin Burt	(United Kingdom) Kelvin Burt	(United Kingdom) Kelvin Burt	(United Kingdom) RML
7	R17	(United Kingdom) Rockingham Motor Speedway	13 September	(United Kingdom) Darren Turner	(United Kingdom) Darren Turner	(United Kingdom) Darren Turner	(United Kingdom) Kevin McGarrity	(United Kingdom) Hodgson Motorsport
7	R18	(United Kingdom) Rockingham Motor Speedway	14 September	(United Kingdom) Kelvin Burt	(United Kingdom) Kelvin Burt	(United Kingdom) Kelvin Burt	(United Kingdom) Kevin McGarrity	(United Kingdom) Hodgson Motorsport
8	R19	(United Kingdom) Rockingham Motor Speedway	6 October	(France) Nicolas Minassian	(France) Nicolas Minassian	(United Kingdom) Kelvin Burt	(Germany) Roland Rehfeld	(United Kingdom) Team West-Tec
8	R20	(United Kingdom) Rockingham Motor Speedway	6 October		(United Kingdom) Darren Turner	(France) Nicolas Minassian	(United Kingdom) Darren Turner	(United Kingdom) Team HTML

== Final points standings ==
Pos	Driver	(United Kingdom)		(Germany)			(United Kingdom)			(Germany)			(United Kingdom)		(United Kingdom)			(United Kingdom)		(United Kingdom)		Pts
Pos	Driver	R1	R2	R3	R4	R5	R6	R7	R8	R9	R10	R11	R12	R13	R14	R15	R16	R17	R18	R19	R20	Pts
1	(France) Nicolas Minassian	3	1*	2*	C	C	7*	C	C	15	7	7	2*	17	7	3	2	3	12	2	3*	2535
2	(United Kingdom) Kelvin Burt	7	4	5	C	C	3	C	C	5	6	12	3	3	1*	1*	1*	11	17*	14*	5	2498
3	(United Kingdom) Jason Plato	6	8	3	C	C	5	C	C	3	3*	3	7	4	4	9	13	4	8	4*	4	2493
4	(United Kingdom) Colin White	1*	2	1*	C	C	11	C	C	4*	5	4	6	7	3	4	3	13	10*	13	10	2463
5	(Germany) Roland Rehfeld	13	14	12	C	C	15	C	C	6	12	6	9	6	5	6	4	2*	13*	1*	2	2296
6	(United Kingdom) Mark Proctor	11	7	9	C	C	8	C	C	7	8	5	14	9	12	10	14	6	5	7	7	2196
7	(United Kingdom) Darren Turner						1*	C	C	1*	1*	13	1*	1*	2	2	12	14*	16	3	1*	2116
8	(United Kingdom) Stevie Hodgson	4*	3	4*	C	C	13*	C	C	14	DNS	10	11	13	13	15	15	12	11	5	13	2101
9	(United Kingdom) Rob Speak	10	5				12	C	C	10	13	11	8	DNS	6	8	10	7	7	15	12	1971
10	(United Kingdom) Anthony Swan	5	13	15	C	C	4	C	C	12	DNS	DNS	10	12	9	7	6	9	4	6	6	1950
11	(United Kingdom) Darren Manning	17*	DNS	10	C	C	6	C	C	2*	4*	1*	5	2*	14	5	5					1693
12	(United Kingdom) John Mickel	2	11	7	C	C	2	C	C	13	2	2*	4	5	8	14	DNS					1675
13	(United Kingdom) John Steward	12	12	6	C	C				9	9	14			11	13	9	16	DNS	10	9	1528
14	(United Kingdom) Phil Weaver	8	16	13	C	C	16	C	C	8	11	8	16	18				17	14	17	14	1414
15	(United Kingdom) Derek Hayes												12	11	10	12	8	5	2	16	11	1197
16	(United Kingdom) Lee O'Keefe	15	9	11	C	C	17	C	C	11	10	9	15	14								1088
17	(United Kingdom) Kevin McGarrity												17	10	DNS	11	7	1*	1*	18	DNS	961
18	(South Africa) Toby Scheckter	14	10	8	C	C	10	C	C													514
19	(United Kingdom) Peter Storm	18	DNS	14	C	C	14	C	C													326
20	(United Kingdom) Paul Evans	9	6																			285
21	(United Kingdom) Ben Collins																	15	3			280
22	(United Kingdom) Matt Neal																			8	8	280
23	(United States) Randy Tolsma																	8	9			275
24	(United Kingdom) Ian McKellar Jr.												13	8								258
25	(Australia) Chris Robinson																	10	15			240
26	(Australia) Shaun Richardson														15	DNS	11					236
27	(United States) Brandon Whitt																			11	15	236
28	(United Kingdom) Tom Guinchard	16	15																			216
29	(United Kingdom) Lee Fitzpatrick												18	15								208
30	(United Kingdom) Colin McRae																	DNS	6			150
31	(United States) Mark Claussner						9	C	C													135
32	(United Kingdom) Paula Cook																			9	DC	135
33	(United Kingdom) Paul Sheard			16	C	C							19	16	16	DNS	DNS			12	DC	122
