= 2003 ASCAR season =

2003 ASCAR

Seasons
- ← 2002 2004 →

The 2003 ASCAR Season was the third season of United Kingdom-based NASCAR style stock car racing, originally known as ASCAR. From this season 'Days of Thunder' was adopted as a promotional brand inspired by the NASCAR based movie of the same name. It was used alongside the ASCAR brand for the 2003 season before taking over entirely from 2004.

== Teams and drivers ==
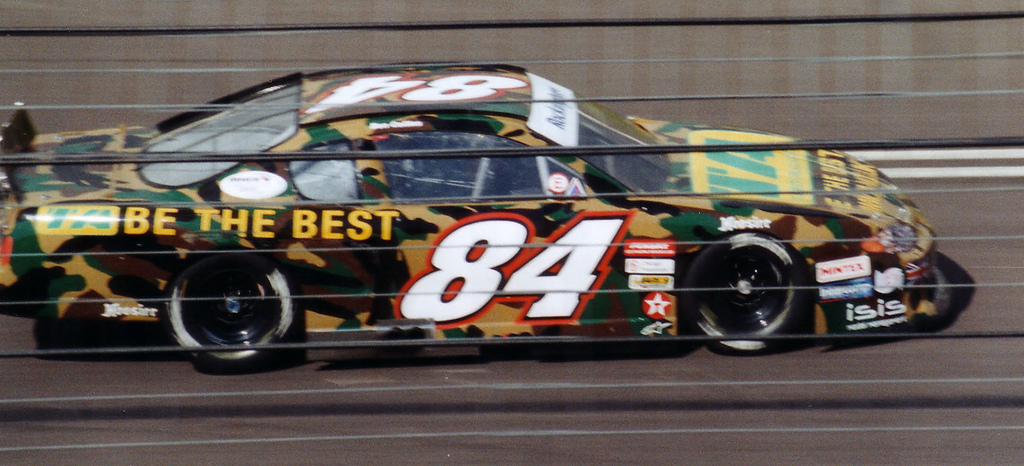
2003 Champion Ben Collins.

Team	Car	No.	Driver	Rounds
Kidd-Richardson Racing	Chevrolet	2	(Australia) Shaun Richardson	All
Deuce Racing-RML	Chevrolet	4	(Colombia) Alejandro Lince	7
Deuce Racing-RML	Chevrolet	33	(United Kingdom) Peter Falding	1
Deuce Racing-RML	Chevrolet	44	(United Kingdom) Anthony Swan	All
Deuce Racing-RML	Chevrolet	48	(United States) Steve Grissom	1
Deuce Racing-RML	Chevrolet	84	(United Kingdom) Ben Collins	All
Team West-Tec	Chevrolet	5	(United Kingdom) Rob Speak	7
Team West-Tec	Chevrolet	42	(Sweden) Niklas Lovén	6
Team West-Tec	Chevrolet	42	(United Kingdom) Chris Cooke	1
Team West-Tec	Ford; Pontiac	96	(Netherlands) Michael Vergers	7
Team West-Tec	Ford; Pontiac	96	(United Kingdom) Derek Hayes	1
Xcel Motorsport	Pontiac	6	(United Kingdom) Stevie Hodgson	5
Xcel Motorsport	Pontiac	7	(United Kingdom) Andrew Kirkaldy	7
Fast Tec Motorsport	Pontiac	12	(United Kingdom) Mark Proctor	All
Shark Racing	Chevrolet	17	(United Kingdom) Tony King	5
TorqueSpeed	Chevrolet	24	(United Kingdom) John Mickel	All
TorqueSpeed	Chevrolet	25	(United Kingdom) Ian McKellar Jr.	All
TorqueSpeed	Chevrolet	26	(United Kingdom) Oli Playle	All
Shearspeed	Pontiac	39	(United Kingdom) Andy Smith	1
Shearspeed	Pontiac	39	(India) Phiroze Bilimoria	1
Intersport Racing	Pontiac	40	(United Kingdom) Kevin Clarke	All
Scott Racing Services	Chevrolet	66	(Republic of Ireland) Kieran Dynes	3
Team HTML	Pontiac	68	(South Africa) Earl Goddard	1
Team HTML	Pontiac	68	(Italy) Max Papis	1
Team HTML	Pontiac	68	(United Kingdom) Derek Hayes	4
Team HTML	Pontiac	69	(Germany) Roland Rehfeld	All
Steward Racing	Ford	75	(United Kingdom) John Steward	All
Team Catchpole Racing	Chevrolet	77	(United Kingdom) Phil Weaver	All
CWS Racing	Chevrolet	78	(United Kingdom) Colin White	All
CWS Racing	Chevrolet	79	(United Kingdom) Chris Cooke	3
CWS Racing	Chevrolet	79	(United Kingdom) Andy Smith	4

== Race calendar ==
The season consisted of eight meetings with either one or two races taking place at each. The grid for the opening race of each meeting was set by a qualifying session with the second race grid being set by the finishing order of the first. Two meetings were held at the EuroSpeedway in Germany with the remaining six at the Rockingham Motor Speedway in the United Kingdom.

Round		Circuit/Location	Date	Pole position	Fastest lap	Led most laps	Winning driver	Winning team
1	R1	(United Kingdom) Rockingham Motor Speedway	11 May	(United Kingdom) Ben Collins	(Germany) Roland Rehfeld	(Netherlands) Michael Vergers	(Netherlands) Michael Vergers	(United Kingdom) Team West-Tec
1	R2	(United Kingdom) Rockingham Motor Speedway	11 May		(United Kingdom) Ben Collins	(Netherlands) Michael Vergers	(Germany) Roland Rehfeld	(United Kingdom) Team HTML
2	R3	(United Kingdom) Rockingham Motor Speedway	8 June	(Germany) Roland Rehfeld	(United Kingdom) Ben Collins	(United Kingdom) Rob Speak	(United Kingdom) Rob Speak	(United Kingdom) Team West-Tec
3	R4	(Germany) EuroSpeedway	6 July	(United Kingdom) Anthony Swan	(United Kingdom) Ian McKellar Jr.	(United Kingdom) Ben Collins	(United Kingdom) Ian McKellar Jr.	(United Kingdom) TorqueSpeed
4	R5	(United Kingdom) Rockingham Motor Speedway	27 July	(United Kingdom) Ben Collins	(United Kingdom) Ben Collins	(United Kingdom) Ben Collins	(United Kingdom) Ian McKellar Jr.	(United Kingdom) TorqueSpeed
4	R6	(United Kingdom) Rockingham Motor Speedway	27 July		(United Kingdom) Derek Hayes	(United Kingdom) Ben Collins	(United Kingdom) Ben Collins	(United Kingdom) RML
5	R7	(United Kingdom) Rockingham Motor Speedway	24 August	(United Kingdom) Derek Hayes	(United Kingdom) Derek Hayes	(Netherlands) Michael Vergers	(Netherlands) Michael Vergers	(United Kingdom) Team West-Tec
5	R8	(United Kingdom) Rockingham Motor Speedway	24 August		(United Kingdom) Andy Smith	(Netherlands) Michael Vergers	(United Kingdom) Ben Collins	(United Kingdom) RML
6	R9	(United Kingdom) Rockingham Motor Speedway	31 August	(Germany) Roland Rehfeld	(Germany) Roland Rehfeld	(United Kingdom) Ben Collins	(United Kingdom) Ben Collins	(United Kingdom) RML
7	R10	(Germany) EuroSpeedway	14 September	(United Kingdom) Ben Collins	(United Kingdom) Ben Collins	(Germany) Roland Rehfeld	(United Kingdom) Ben Collins	(United Kingdom) RML
7	R11	(Germany) EuroSpeedway	14 September		(United Kingdom) Ben Collins	(United Kingdom) Colin White	(United Kingdom) Colin White	(United Kingdom) CWS Racing
8	R12	(United Kingdom) Rockingham Motor Speedway	28 September	(United Kingdom) Ben Collins	(United Kingdom) Ben Collins	(United Kingdom) Ben Collins	(United Kingdom) Ben Collins	(United Kingdom) RML
8	R13	(United Kingdom) Rockingham Motor Speedway	28 September		(United Kingdom) Ben Collins	(United Kingdom) Ben Collins	(United Kingdom) Ben Collins	(United Kingdom) RML

== Final points standings ==
Pos	Driver	(United Kingdom)		(United Kingdom)	(Germany)	(United Kingdom)		(United Kingdom)		(United Kingdom)	(Germany)		(United Kingdom)		Pts
Pos	Driver	R1	R2	R3	R4	R5	R6	R7	R8	R9	R10	R11	R12	R13	Pts
1	(United Kingdom) Ben Collins	4*	2	3	2*	3*	1*	5*	1*	1*	1*	11*	1*	1*	2299
2	(United Kingdom) Colin White	6	5	10	6	5	7	3	6	4	2	1*	5	4	2044
3	(Netherlands) Michael Vergers	1*	3*		3	2*	3*	1*	13*	5	11	6	4	5	1963
4	(Germany) Roland Rehfeld	7	1*	9*	17	7	10	2	3	2*	9*	10	3	6	1962
5	(United Kingdom) Ian McKellar Jr.	20	13	4	1*	1*	12*	15	DNS	3	3	2*	2	2	1821
6	(United Kingdom) Anthony Swan	15	11	11	8*	11	15	10	5	7	4	3	8	7	1804
7	(United Kingdom) Mark Proctor	12	DNS	8	7	6	2*	6	2	9	6	5	9	19	1722
8	(United Kingdom) Phil Weaver	10	6	13	12	10	5	19	17	16	14	14	17	10	1567
9	(Australia) Shaun Richardson	18	17	20	10	16	9	9	4	6	15	15	18	12	1546
10	(United Kingdom) Oli Playle	3	4	19	16	15	8	21	18	13	7	13	23	22	1509
11	(United Kingdom) John Steward	15	10	16	18	18	DNS	8	8	15	13	9	12	13	1421
12	(United Kingdom) John Mickel	19	DNS	7	5*	12*	DNS	17	16	8	5	4*	21	16	1390
13	(United Kingdom) Andrew Kirkaldy	14	12	12	15			4	14*	17	10	8	7	20	1363
14	(United Kingdom) Kevin Clarke	21	DNS	6	19	9	6	11	11	14	8	7	22	DNS	1351
15	(United Kingdom) Rob Speak	8	8	1*	4	14	DNS	18	DNS	11			6	3	1278
16	(Colombia) Alejandro Lince	5	16	5	13	13	16	14	15	12	WD	WD			1116
17	(United Kingdom) Andy Smith	13	14					20	7	10	12	12	19	18	1034
18	(United Kingdom) Stevie Hodgson	2	15	2	9	17	DNS						16	17	1020
19	(United Kingdom) Tony King	11	9	21		19	DNS	12	9				15	14	923
20	(United Kingdom) Derek Hayes			17		4	4	16*	DNS	19			14	8	892
21	(Sweden) Niklas Lovén	DNS	18	18	11	8	11			18			13	21	891
22	(United Kingdom) Chris Cooke			15	14	DNS	14	7	12						610
23	(Republic of Ireland) Kieran Dynes							13	10	20			10	9	603
24	(South Africa) Earl Goddard	9	7												280
25	(United Kingdom) Peter Falding												11	11	252
26	(India) Phiroze Billimoria												20	15	200
27	(Italy) Max Papis			14											114
28	(United States) Steve Grissom	17	DNS												102
