= 2004 Days of Thunder season =

Motor racing competition

2004 Days of Thunder Racing

Seasons
- ← 2003 2005 →

The 2004 Days of Thunder season was the fourth season of United Kingdom-based NASCAR style stock car racing, originally known as ASCAR. For this season the Days of Thunder brand was adopted entirely in place of the ASCAR name having been introduced as a promotional brand the previous season.

== Teams and drivers ==
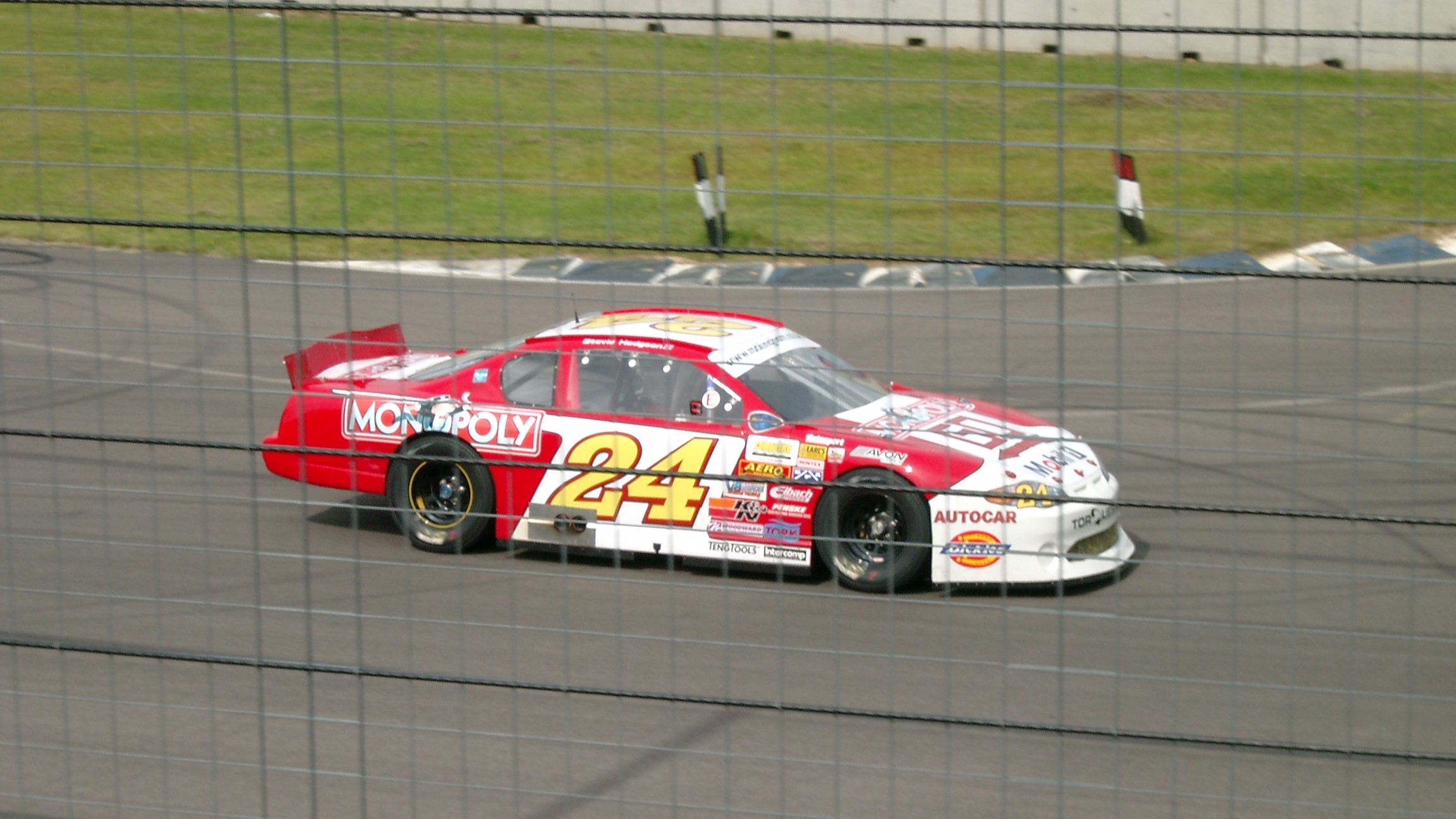
2004 Champion Stevie Hodgson.

Team	Car	No.	Driver	Rounds
Kidd-Richardson Racing	Chevrolet	2	(Australia) Shaun Richardson	All
Kidd-Richardson Racing	Chevrolet	11	(United Kingdom) 'Skid Carrera'	All
Team Turn Four	Ford	5	(United Kingdom) Rob Speak	4
Team Turn Four	Chevrolet	42	(United Kingdom) Ben Collins	All
24:7 Motorsport	Chevrolet	7	(United Kingdom) Mike Luck	All
Team West-Tec	Chevrolet	8	(United Kingdom) Chris Cooke	All
Team West-Tec	Chevrolet	28	(Netherlands) Michael Vergers	All
Team West-Tec	Pontiac	88	(United Kingdom) Oli Playle	All
TorqueSpeed	Chevrolet	10	(Australia) Chris Robinson	1
TorqueSpeed	Chevrolet	16	(United Kingdom) Steve Dance	1
TorqueSpeed	Chevrolet	23	(United Kingdom) Anthony Swan	All
TorqueSpeed	Chevrolet	24	(United Kingdom) John Mickel	1
TorqueSpeed	Chevrolet	24	(United Kingdom) Stevie Hodgson	5
TorqueSpeed	Chevrolet	25	(United Kingdom) Ian McKellar Jr.	5
TorqueSpeed	Chevrolet	25	(United Kingdom) Mark Willis	1
TorqueSpeed	Chevrolet	27	(United Kingdom) Stevie Hodgson	1
TorqueSpeed	Chevrolet	27	(United Kingdom) Chris Harris	1
TorqueSpeed	Chevrolet	27	(United Kingdom) Duncan Gray	1
TorqueSpeed	Ford	66	(United Kingdom) John Mickel	5
TorqueSpeed	Chevrolet	17	(United Kingdom) Tony King	2
Team HTML	Pontiac	17	(United Kingdom) Tony King	4
Team HTML	Pontiac	68	(United Kingdom) Rob Speak	1
Team HTML	Pontiac	69	(France) Thierry Haenel	1
Fast Tec Motorsport	Pontiac	12	(United Kingdom) Mark Proctor	All
Renegade Racing	Chevrolet	19	(United Kingdom) John Jon Higgins	All
Renegade Racing	Chevrolet	20	(United Kingdom) Steve Hobday	All
Intersport Racing	Pontiac	33	(United Kingdom) Peter Falding	All
Steward Racing	Ford	75	(United Kingdom) John Steward	All
Team Catchpole Racing	Chevrolet	77	(United Kingdom) Phil Weaver	5
Team Catchpole Racing	Chevrolet	77	(United Kingdom) Duncan Gray	1
CWS Racing	Chevrolet	78	(United Kingdom) Colin White	5
CWS Racing	Chevrolet	85	(Republic of Ireland) Malcolm Clein	All

== Race calendar ==
All races were held at the Rockingham Motor Speedway in Corby, Northamptonshire.

The season consisted of six meetings of two races taking place on the first Sunday of each month from May to October. The grid for the opening race of each meeting was set by a qualifying session with the second race grid being set by the finishing order of the first.

Round		Date	Pole position	Fastest lap	Led most laps	Winning driver	Winning team
1	R1	2 May	(United Kingdom) Anthony Swan	(United Kingdom) Anthony Swan	(United Kingdom) Anthony Swan	(United Kingdom) Colin White	(United Kingdom) CWS Racing
1	R2	2 May		(United Kingdom) Ben Collins	(United Kingdom) Colin White	(United Kingdom) Colin White	(United Kingdom) CWS Racing
2	R3	6 June	(United Kingdom) Ben Collins	(United Kingdom) Ben Collins	(United Kingdom) Ben Collins	(United Kingdom) Ben Collins	(United Kingdom) Team Turn Four
2	R4	6 June		(Netherlands) Michael Vergers	(Netherlands) Michael Vergers	(Netherlands) Michael Vergers	(United Kingdom) Team West-Tec
3	R5	4 July	(United Kingdom) Mark Willis	(United Kingdom) Anthony Swan	(United Kingdom) Stevie Hodgson	(United Kingdom) Stevie Hodgson	(United Kingdom) TorqueSpeed
3	R6	4 July		(United Kingdom) Stevie Hodgson	(United Kingdom) Oli Playle	(United Kingdom) John Steward	(United Kingdom) Steward Racing
4	R7	1 August	(United Kingdom) Oli Playle	(United Kingdom) Oli Playle	(United Kingdom) Oli Playle	(United Kingdom) Oli Playle	(United Kingdom) Team West-Tec
4	R8	1 August		(United Kingdom) John Mickel	(United Kingdom) Ian McKellar Jr.	(United Kingdom) Ian McKellar Jr.	(United Kingdom) TorqueSpeed
5	R9	5 September	(United Kingdom) Stevie Hodgson	(United Kingdom) Ian McKellar Jr.	(United Kingdom) Stevie Hodgson	(United Kingdom) Stevie Hodgson	(United Kingdom) TorqueSpeed
5	R10	5 September		(United Kingdom) Colin White	(United Kingdom) Stevie Hodgson	(United Kingdom) Colin White	(United Kingdom) CWS Racing
6	R11	3 October	(United Kingdom) Oli Playle	(United Kingdom) Stevie Hodgson	(United Kingdom) Ian McKellar Jr.	(United Kingdom) Ian McKellar Jr.	(United Kingdom) TorqueSpeed
6	R12	3 October		(United Kingdom) Ian McKellar Jr.	(United Kingdom) Ian McKellar Jr.	(United Kingdom) Ian McKellar Jr.	(United Kingdom) TorqueSpeed

== Final points standings ==
Pos	Driver	R1	R2	R3	R4	R5	R6	R7	R8	R9	R10	R11	R12	Pts
1	(United Kingdom) Stevie Hodgson	2	5*	6	3	1*	4*	2	3*	1*	9*	2*	3*	2010
2	(United Kingdom) John Steward	4	4	7	7	5	1*	10	13	13	13	6	11	1720
3	(Australia) Shaun Richardson	11	15	21	12	10	5	8	6	6	5	3	5	1645
4	(United Kingdom) Ben Collins	5	3*	1*	EX	7	6	9	4	7	7	11	19	1610
5	(United Kingdom) Mark Proctor	3	6	8	6	16	12	13	7	15	11	9	8	1607
6	(United Kingdom) John Mickel	12	DNS	4	5*	3	2*	3*	2	10	6	4*	DNS	1567
7	(United Kingdom) Oli Playle	10	DNS	17	4	4	3*	1*	15*	3	17	17	4*	1561
8	(United Kingdom) Anthony Swan	6*	2*	20	15	19	DNS	4	5	2	3	8	16	1525
9	(Netherlands) Michael Vergers	16	12	3	1*	12*	19	20	DNS	8	8	5	2	1499
10	(United Kingdom) Colin White	1*	1*	2	20	2	7	18	DNS	4*	1*	WD	WD	1383
11	(Republic of Ireland) Malcolm Clein	13	14	16	14	22	16	14	11	9	12	13	12	1379
12	(United Kingdom) Tony King	7	11	11	16	6	18	19	12	20	18	18	18	1356
13	(United Kingdom) Mike Luck	15	10	12	19	18	14	15	8	17	19	15	10	1354
14	(United Kingdom) Peter Falding	17	13	9	9	15	13	11	9	19	21	20	17	1352
15	(United Kingdom) Ian McKellar Jr.	18	DNS	5	17			5	1*	16	2*	1*	1*	1346
16	(United Kingdom) 'Skid Carrera'	14	7	18	10	17	17	22	17	11	15	14	13	1345
17	(United Kingdom) John Jon Higgins	20	DNS	10	8	13	15	21	14	5	10	12	9	1331
18	(United Kingdom) Chris Cooke	19	17	15	2	11	10	6	10	12	20	21	DNS	1311
19	(United Kingdom) Steve Hobday	9	9	19	18	14	11	17	DNS	18	16	19	14	1226
20	(United Kingdom) Phil Weaver	22	16	13	11	20	DNS			21	14	10	7	1087
21	(United Kingdom) Rob Speak	21	DNS			8	8	12	DSQ	14	4	7*	6	1063
22	(United Kingdom) Duncan Gray							16	18			16	15	420
23	(France) Thierry Haenel	8	8											280
24	(United Kingdom) Mark Willis					9	9							270
25	(United Kingdom) Steve Dance							7	16					256
26	(United Kingdom) Chris Harris			14	13									232
27	(Australia) Chris Robinson					21	20							177
