= 2006 SCSA season =

UK stock car racing season

2006 SCSA

Seasons
- ← 2005 2007 →

The 2006 SCSA Season was the sixth season of United Kingdom-based NASCAR style stock car racing, originally known as ASCAR.

== Teams and drivers ==
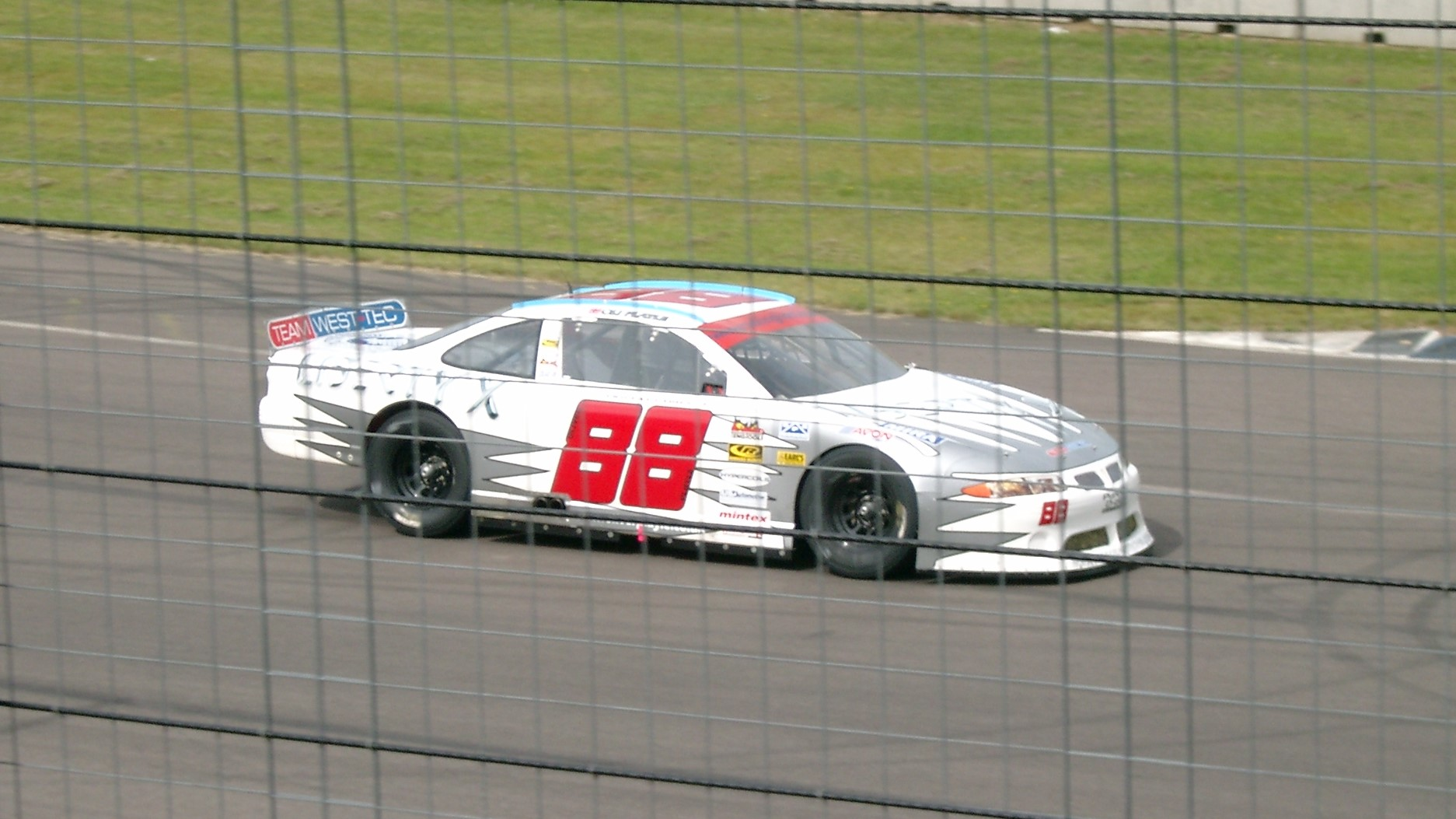
2006 Champion Oli Playle.

Team	Car	No.	Driver	Rounds
Revolution Racing	Chevrolet	7	(United Kingdom) Mike Luck	All
Revolution Racing	Chevrolet	98	(United Kingdom) Tony Hurdle	All
Team Ranger Racing	Chevrolet	9	(United Kingdom) Pete Wilkinson	1
Steward Racing	Ford	15	(United Kingdom) Mark Willis	2
Steward Racing	Ford	15	(United Kingdom) Hunter Abbott	1
Steward Racing	Ford	74	(United Kingdom) Paul Poulter	1
Steward Racing	Ford	75	(United Kingdom) John Steward	All
Team Networking	Chevrolet	31	(United Kingdom) Duncan Gray	3
Team Networking	Chevrolet	59	(United Kingdom) Lee O'Keefe	2
Team Tor Trucks	Pontiac	48	(United Kingdom) Peter Falding	1
Team Tor Trucks	Pontiac	48	(United Kingdom) Shane Brereton	5
M-Tec	Chevrolet	66	(United Kingdom) Martin Heath	2
Team Catchpole Racing	Chevrolet	71	(United Kingdom) Steve Dance	1
Team Catchpole Racing	Chevrolet	77	(United Kingdom) Phil Weaver	2
CWS Racing	Chevrolet	78	(United Kingdom) Colin White	All
CWS Racing	Chevrolet	79	(United Kingdom) Keith White	2
CWS Racing	Chevrolet	85	(United Kingdom) Keith White	1
CWS Racing	Chevrolet	85	(United Kingdom) 'Skid Carrera'	3
Team West-Tec	Pontiac	88	(United Kingdom) Oli Playle	All

== Race calendar ==
All races were held at the Rockingham Motor Speedway in Corby, Northamptonshire.

The season consisted of six meetings of two races each. The grid for the opening race of each meeting was set by a qualifying session with the second race grid being set by the finishing order of the first.

Round		Date	Pole position	Fastest lap	Led most laps	Winning driver	Winning team
1	R1	7 May	(United Kingdom) John Steward	(United Kingdom) Colin White	(United Kingdom) Mark Willis	(United Kingdom) Mark Willis	(United Kingdom) Steward Racing
1	R2	7 May		(United Kingdom) Oli Playle	(United Kingdom) Oli Playle	(United Kingdom) Oli Playle	(United Kingdom) Team West-Tec
2	R3	25 June	(United Kingdom) Oli Playle	(United Kingdom) Oli Playle	(United Kingdom) Oli Playle	(United Kingdom) Oli Playle	(United Kingdom) Team West-Tec
2	R4	25 June		(United Kingdom) Oli Playle	(United Kingdom) Oli Playle	(United Kingdom) Oli Playle	(United Kingdom) Team West-Tec
3	R5	9 July	(United Kingdom) Oli Playle	(United Kingdom) Oli Playle	(United Kingdom) Oli Playle	(United Kingdom) Oli Playle	(United Kingdom) Team West-Tec
3	R6	9 July		(United Kingdom) Oli Playle	(United Kingdom) Oli Playle	(United Kingdom) Oli Playle	(United Kingdom) Team West-Tec
4	R7	13 August	(United Kingdom) Oli Playle	(United Kingdom) Oli Playle	(United Kingdom) Oli Playle	(United Kingdom) Oli Playle	(United Kingdom) Team West-Tec
4	R8	13 August	Cancelled due to rain				
5	R9	10 September	(United Kingdom) Oli Playle	(United Kingdom) Oli Playle	(United Kingdom) Oli Playle	(United Kingdom) Oli Playle	(United Kingdom) Team West-Tec
5	R10	11 September		(United Kingdom) Oli Playle	(United Kingdom) Oli Playle	(United Kingdom) Oli Playle	(United Kingdom) Team West-Tec
6	R11	8 October	(United Kingdom) Oli Playle	(United Kingdom) Colin White	(United Kingdom) John Steward	(United Kingdom) Colin White	(United Kingdom) CWS Racing
6	R12	8 October		(United Kingdom) Colin White	(United Kingdom) Colin White	(United Kingdom) Colin White	(United Kingdom) CWS Racing

== Final points standings ==
Pos	Driver	R1	R2	R3	R4	R5	R6	R7	R8	R9	R10	R11	R12	Pts
1	(United Kingdom) Oli Playle	2*	1*	1*	1*	1*	1*	1*	C	1*	1*	10	DNS	1985
2	(United Kingdom) Mike Luck	6	6	5	6	5	6	8	C	11	8	9	5	1910
3	(United Kingdom) Colin White	3	2	2	8	2	2*	3	C	13	10	1*	1*	1905
4	(United Kingdom) John Steward	7*	DNS	3	2	6	5	4	C	9	3	2*	4	1885
5	(United Kingdom) Tony Hurdle	8	DNS	8	5	4	3	5	C	4	2	8	3	1835
6	(United Kingdom) Shane Brereton			4	3	3	4	2	C	5	4	3	9	1690
7	(United Kingdom) 'Skid Carrera'	4	4					6	C	6	5			1080
8	(United Kingdom) Duncan Gray							10	C	10	7	6	6	865
9	(United Kingdom) Keith White			7	4			9	C	12	9			850
10	(United Kingdom) Lee O'Keefe									7	6	5	2	720
11	(United Kingdom) Martin Heath									8	12	4	8	525
12	(United Kingdom) Mark Willis	1*	3	9	DNS									400
13	(United Kingdom) Peter Falding	5	5											360
14	(United Kingdom) Hunter Abbott							7	C					350
15	(United Kingdom) Pete Wilkinson											7	7	340
16	(United Kingdom) Phil Weaver	9	7							3	13			240
17	(United Kingdom) Paul Poulter									2	11			205
18	(United Kingdom) Steve Dance			6	7									185
