= Days of Thunder (disambiguation) =

Days of Thunder is a 1990 feature film starring Tom Cruise.

Days of Thunder may also refer to:

== Entertainment ==
- Days of Thunder (franchise), a multimedia franchise
  - Days of Thunder, the 1990 film
  - Days of Thunder (2028 film), the 2028 sequel to the 1990 film
- Days of Thunder (soundtrack), the soundtrack to the 1990 film
- Days of Thunder (1990 video game), 1990 video game based on the original film
- Days of Thunder (2011 video game), 2011 video game based on the original film

== Sports ==
- 2004 Days of Thunder season, fourth season of United Kingdom-based NASCAR style stock car racing, originally known as ASCAR Racing Series
