= Colin White (racing driver) =

British racing driver

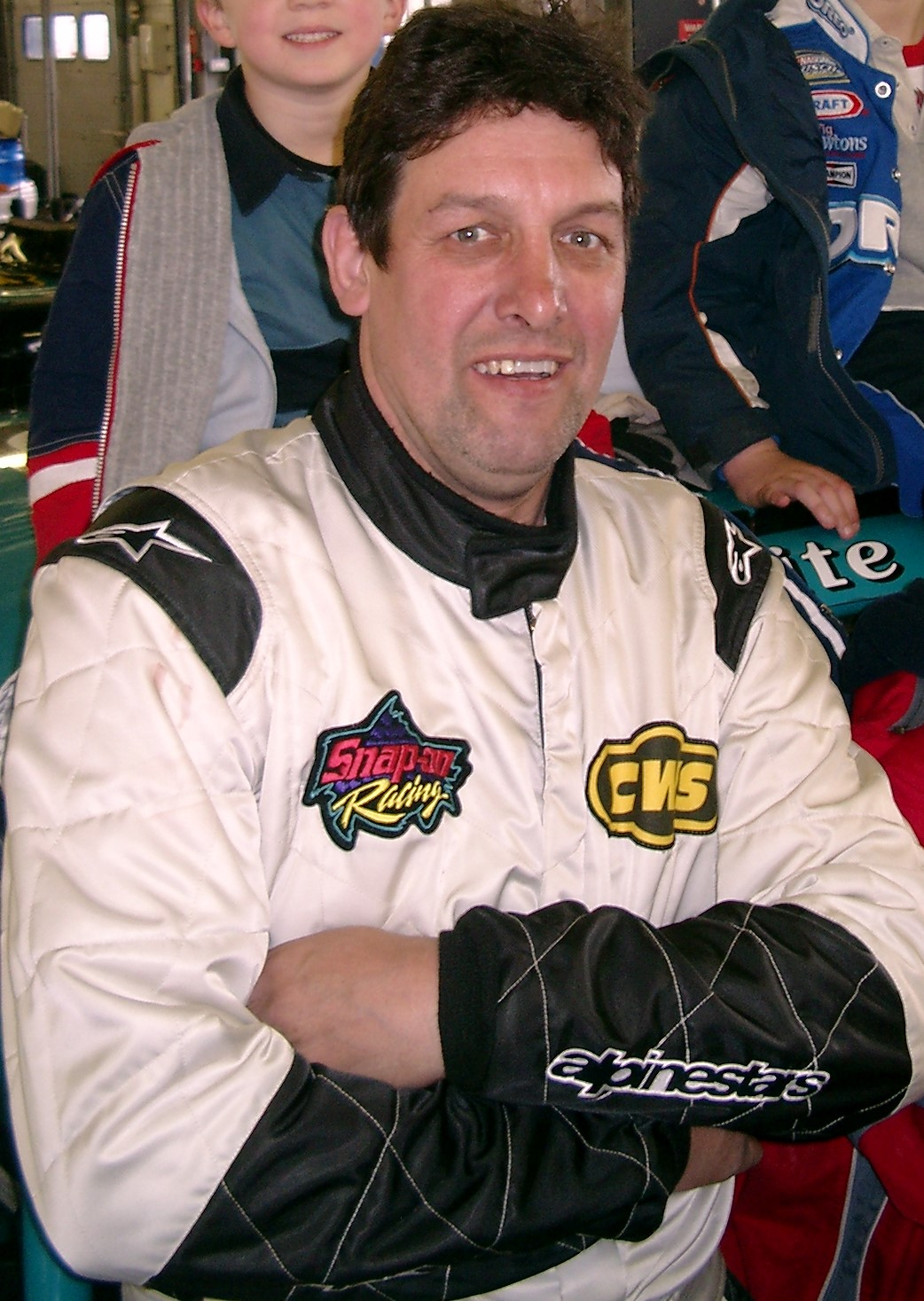
- White at Rockingham in 2006
- Nationality: British
- Born: 27 September 1956 (age 70) Glastonbury, Somerset
- Relatives: Keith White (brother)

Ginetta GT4 Supercup career
- Debut season: 2009
- Current team: CWS Racing
- Car number: 78
- Starts: 182
- Wins: 0
- Podiums: 4
- Poles: 0
- Best finish: 5th in 2011 and 2012

Previous series
- 2016-17 2016 2012-14 2007-08, 2010 2001-07: 24H Endurance Series; NASCAR Whelen Euro Series; British GT Championship; Britcar 24hr ASCAR

Championship titles
- 2021 2020-21 2015-16 2007: 24H TCE Series - TCX; Ginetta GT4 Supercup (Pro-Am Class); Ginetta GT4 Supercup (Am Class); ASCAR

Colin White (born 27 September 1956) is a British racing driver from Glastonbury, Somerset. He currently races in the Ginetta GT4 Supercup for his own CWS Racing team. He is also known for his extensive background in stock car racing having raced in every season of ASCAR between 2001 and 2007 winning the championship in the final season. His brother Keith is also a racing driver. White was welcomed back into the paddock at Brands Hatch over the weekend after being released from hospital to recover from the injuries suffered in a huge accident with fellow racer Mike Brown at Thruxton on 28 August 2022.

== Career summary ==
Season	Series	Team	Races	Wins	Poles	F/Laps	Podiums	Points	Position
2001	ASCAR	CWS Racing	5	0	0	0	?	?	?
2002	ASCAR	CWS Racing	16	2	1	1	5	2463	4th
2003	ASCAR	CWS Racing	13	1	0	0	3	2044	2nd
2004	Days of Thunder Racing	CWS Racing	9	3	0	1	5	1383	10th
2005	SCSA	CWS Racing	12	0	0	0	1	2085	3rd
2006	SCSA	CWS Racing	11	2	0	3	8	1905	3rd
2007	SCSA	CWS Racing	8	5	0	5	8	1940	1st
2007	Britcar 24 Hour - Class 1	CWS Racing	1	0	0	0	1	N/A	2nd
2008	Britcar 24 Hour - Class 3	CWS Racing	1	0	0	0	0	N/A	DNF
2009	Ginetta G50 Cup	CWS Racing	27	0	0	0	0	287	8th
2010	Ginetta G50 Cup	CWS Racing	28	0	0	0	0	297	9th
2010	Britcar 24 Hour - Class 3	CWS Engineering Ltd / CWS Spares 4x4	1	0	0	0	0	N/A	9th
2011	Ginetta GT Supercup	CWS Racing	27	0	0	1	2	443	5th
2012	Ginetta GT Supercup	CWS	27	0	0	1	2	402	5th
2012	British GT Championship - GTC Class	CWS	2	2	1	1	2	25	3rd
2013	Ginetta GT Supercup	CWS	20	0	0	0	0	133	14th
2013	British GT Championship	CWS	10	0	0	0	0	6	25th
2014	British GT Championship	CWS Racing; MP-AMR	5	0	0	0	0	-0.5	39th
2015	Ginetta GT4 Supercup - Am Class	FW Motorsport	3	3	1	3	3	702	1st
2015	Ginetta GT4 Supercup - Am Class	CWS 4x4 Spares	19	14	3	14	20	702	1st
2016	Ginetta GT4 Supercup - Am Class	CWS Racing	23	18	5	16	18	596	1st
2016	NASCAR Whelen Euro Series	Raceway Venray	2	0	0	0	0	51	35th
2017	Ginetta GT4 Supercup - Am Class	CWS Racing	22	9	1	6	20	650	2nd
2017	24H Series - SP3-GT4	CWS	1	0	0	0	0	0	NC
2018	Ginetta GT4 Supercup - Am Class	CWS Racing	23	7	0	4	16	600	2nd
2019	Ginetta GT4 Supercup - Am Class	CWS Racing	23	7	0	8	16	557	2nd
2020	Ginetta GT4 Supercup - Pro-Am Class	CWS Motorsport	19	5	0	5	18	558	1st
2021	Ginetta GT4 Supercup - Pro-Am Class	CWS Motorsport	23	17	2	16	20	723	1st

=== Complete Ginetta G50 Cup results ===
(key) (Races in bold indicate pole position – 1 point awarded just in first race; races in italics indicate fastest lap – 1 point awarded all races;-

Year	Team	1	2	3	4	5	6	7	8	9	10	11	12	13	14	15	16	17	18	19	20	21	22	23	24	25	26	27	28	29	DC	Points
2009	CWS	BHI; 1; 12	BHI; 2; 8	BHI; 3; 6	THR; 1; 10	THR; 2; 9	THR; 3; 7	DON; 1; 7	DON; 2; 10	DON; 3 Ret	OUL; 1; 16	OUL; 2 c	CRO; 1; 10	CRO; 2; 11	CRO; 3; 11	SNE; 1; 7	SNE; 2; 7	SNE; 3; 10	KNO; 1; 8	KNO; 2; 9	KNO; 3; 8	SIL; 1; 14	SIL; 2; 11	SIL; 3; 8	ROC; 1; 12	ROC; 2 Ret	ROC; 3; 9	BHGP; 1 Ret	BHGP; 2 DNS	BHGP; 3; 12	8th	287
2010	CWS	THR; 1; 16	THR; 2; 10	THR; 3; 10	ROC; 1; 8	ROC; 2; 10	ROC; 3 Ret	BHGP; 1; 7	BHGP; 2; 15	BHGP; 3 Ret	OUL; 1; 7	OUL; 2; 14	CRO; 1; 14	CRO; 2; 12	CRO; 3; 9	SNE; 1; 11	SNE; 2; 7	SNE; 3; 5	SIL; 1; 9	SIL; 2; 13	KNO; 1 Ret	KNO; 2; 8	KNO; 3 Ret	DON; 1; 10	DON; 2; 7	DON; 3; 8	BHI; 1; 11	BHI; 2; 11	BHI; 3; 13		9th	297

=== Complete Ginetta GT4 Supercup results ===
(key) (Races in bold indicate pole position – 1 point awarded just in first race; races in italics indicate fastest lap – 1 point awarded all races;-

Year	Team	Class	1	2	3	4	5	6	7	8	9	10	11	12	13	14	15	16	17	18	19	20	21	22	23	24	25	26	27	DC	Points
2011	CWS Racing	G55	BHI; 1; 5	BHI; 2; 4	**BHI**; **3** Ret	THR; 1; 8	THR; 2; 5	**THR**; **3**; 8	DON; 1; 6	DON; 2; 3	DON; 3; 6	OUL; 1; 5	OUL; 2 Ret	CRO; 1; 3	CRO; 2; 11	CRO; 3; 8	SNE; 1 Ret	SNE; 2; 6	**SNE**; **3** Ret	KNO; 1; 6	KNO; 2; 13	KNO; 3; 12	ROC; 1; 7	ROC; 2; 9	BHGP; 1; 5	BHGP; 2; 6	BHGP; 3; 4	SIL; 1; 6	SIL; 2; 6	5th	443
2012	CWS	G55	BHI; 1; 7	BHI; 2; 2	BHI; 3; 4	DON; 1; 6	DON; 2; 4	DON; 3 Ret	THR; 1; 13	THR; 2 Ret	THR; 3; 7	OUL; 1; 11	OUL; 2; 7	CRO; 1; 6	CRO; 2; 4	**CRO**; **3**; 11	SNE; 1; 7	SNE; 2; 7	SNE; 3 Ret	KNO; 1; 9	KNO; 2; 8	KNO; 3; 8	ROC; 1; 3	ROC; 2; 5	SIL; 1; 7	SIL; 2; 6	BHGP; 1; 7	BHGP; 2 Ret	BHGP; 3; 8	5th	443
2013	CWS	G55	BHI; 1	BHI; 2	BHI; 3	DON; 1 Ret	DON; 2; 13	DON; 3; 9	THR; 1 Ret	THR; 2 Ret	THR; 3 DNS	OUL; 1; 10	OUL; 2 DNS	CRO; 1; 10	CRO; 2 Ret	CRO; 3; 5	SNE; 1 Ret	SNE; 2; 13	SNE; 3; 10	KNO; 1; 9	KNO; 2 Ret	KNO; 3 Ret	ROC; 1	ROC; 2	SIL; 1; 11	SIL; 2; 11	BHGP; 1; 17	BHGP; 2 Ret	BHGP; 3; 15	14th	133
2015	FW Motorsport	Amateur	**BHI**; **1**; 8	**BHI**; **2**; 12	**BHI**; **3**; 10																									1st	702
2015	CWS 4x4 Spares	Amateur				**DON**; **1** Ret	DON; 2; 8	**DON**; **3**; 11	THR; 1; 13	THR; 2; 11	**THR**; **3**; 9	OUL; 1; 10	OUL; 2; 11	CRO; 1	CRO; 2	CRO; 3	SNE; 1; 8	SNE; 2; 10	SNE; 3; 11	**KNO**; **1**; 8	**KNO**; **2**; 8	**KNO**; **3**; 7	ROC; 1	ROC; 2	SIL; 1; 14	SIL; 2; 19	**BHGP**; **1**; 12	**BHGP**; **2**; 12	**BHGP**; **3**; 13	1st	702
2016	CWS 4x4 Spares	Amateur	BHI; 1; 11	**BHI**; **2**; 9	**BHI**; **3**; 9	DON; 1; 14	DON; 2; 10	**DON**; **3**; 12	OUL; 1; 10	**OUL**; **2**; 12	**SNE**; **1**; 7	**SNE**; **2**; 10	SNE; 3 C	**KNO**; **1**; 6	**KNO**; **2**; 7	**KNO**; **3** Ret	KNO; 4; 5	**ROC**; **1**; 7	**ROC**; **2**; 8	**ROC**; **3** Ret	**SIL**; **1**; 7	**SIL**; **2** Ret	SIL; 3; 11	**BHGP**; **1**; 13	**BHGP**; **2** Ret	BHGP; 3; 10				1st	596
2017	CWS Racing	Amateur	BHI; 1; 11	**BHI**; **2**; 5	BHI; 3 DNS	DON; 1; 10	**DON**; **2**; 8	**DON**; **3**; 13	**OUL**; **1**; 7	**OUL**; **2**; 9	CRO; 1; 13	CRO; 2; 10	CRO; 3; 10	SNE; 1; 12	SNE; 2; 12	SNE; 3; 12	ROC; 1; 9	ROC; 2 Ret	ROC; 3; 16	SIL; 1; 13	SIL; 2; 7	SIL; 3; 11	BHGP; 1; 9	**BHGP**; **2**; 10	BHGP; 3; 12					2nd	650
2018	CWS Racing	Amateur	BHI; 1; 16	BHI; 2 Ret	BHI; 3; 11	DON; 1; 10	DON; 2; 7	DON; 3; 9	OUL; 1; 13	OUL; 2; 8	CRO; 1; 9	CRO; 2; 15	CRO; 3; 11	SNE; 1; 13	SNE; 2; 9	SNE; 3; 4	ROC; 1; 10	ROC; 2; 6	ROC; 3; 10	SIL; 1; 14	SIL; 2; 10	SIL; 3 Ret	BHGP; 1; 11	BHGP; 2; 11	BHGP; 3; 6					2nd	600
2019	CWS Racing	Amateur	BHI; 1; 13	BHI; 2 Ret	BHI; 3; 7	DON; 1 Ret	DON; 2; 4	DON; 3 Ret	CRO; 1; 7	CRO; 2; 7	CRO; 3; 6	OUL; 1; 10	OUL; 2; 6	THR; 1; 8	THR; 2; 4	THR; 3; 7	KNO; 1; 8	KNO; 2; 6	KNO; 3; 9	SIL; 1; 13	SIL; 2; 11	SIL; 3; 10	BHGP; 1 Ret	BHGP; 2; 12	BHGP; 3; 11					2nd	557
2020	CWS Motorsport	Pro-Am	DON; 1; 8	DON; 2; 9	DON; 3; 7	BHGP; 1 Ret	BHGP; 2; 11	BHGP; 3; 10	OUL; 1; 7	**OUL**; **2**; 6	THR; 1; 6	THR; 2; 9	THR; 3; 8	CRO; 1; 8	CRO; 2; 8	CRO; 3; 7	SNE; 1; 8	SNE; 2; 9	SNE; 3; 9	BHI; 1; 7	BHI; 2; 9									1st	558
2021	CWS Motorsport	Pro-Am	SNE; 1; 13	**SNE**; **2**; 14	SNE; 3; 17	**BHI**; **1**; 7	**BHI**; **2**; 10	BHI; 3; 13	**OUL**; **1**; 8	**OUL**; **2**; 9	KNO; 1; 12	**KNO**; **2**; 11	KNO; 3; 12	THR; 1; 10	**THR**; **2**; 9	THR; 3; 9	CRO; 1; 13	CRO; 2; 11	CRO; 3 Ret	DON; 1; 12	DON; 2; 11	DON; 3; 13	BHGP; 1; 17	BHGP; 2 Ret	BHGP; 3; 13					1st	723

== Britcar 24Hour results ==
Year	Team	Co-Drivers	Car	Car No.	Class	Laps	Pos.	Class Pos.
2007	(United Kingdom) CWS Racing	(Germany) Frank Nohring (United Kingdom) Matthew Truelove	BMW M3 E46 CSL	45	1	564	11th	2nd
2008	(United Kingdom) CWS Racing	(Germany) Frank Nöhring (United Kingdom) Matthew Truelove (United Kingdom) Rupert Douglas-Pennant	BMW M3 E46	40	3	83	DNF	DNF
2010	(United Kingdom) CWS Engineering Ltd / CWS Spares 4x4	(Germany) Frank Nöhring (United Kingdom) Matthew Truelove	BMW M3 E46	30	1	516	14th	9th
