= 2007 SCSA season =

2007 SCSA

Seasons
- ← 2006 2008 →

The 2007 SCSA Season was the seventh season of United Kingdom-based NASCAR style stock car racing, originally known as ASCAR.

== Teams and drivers ==
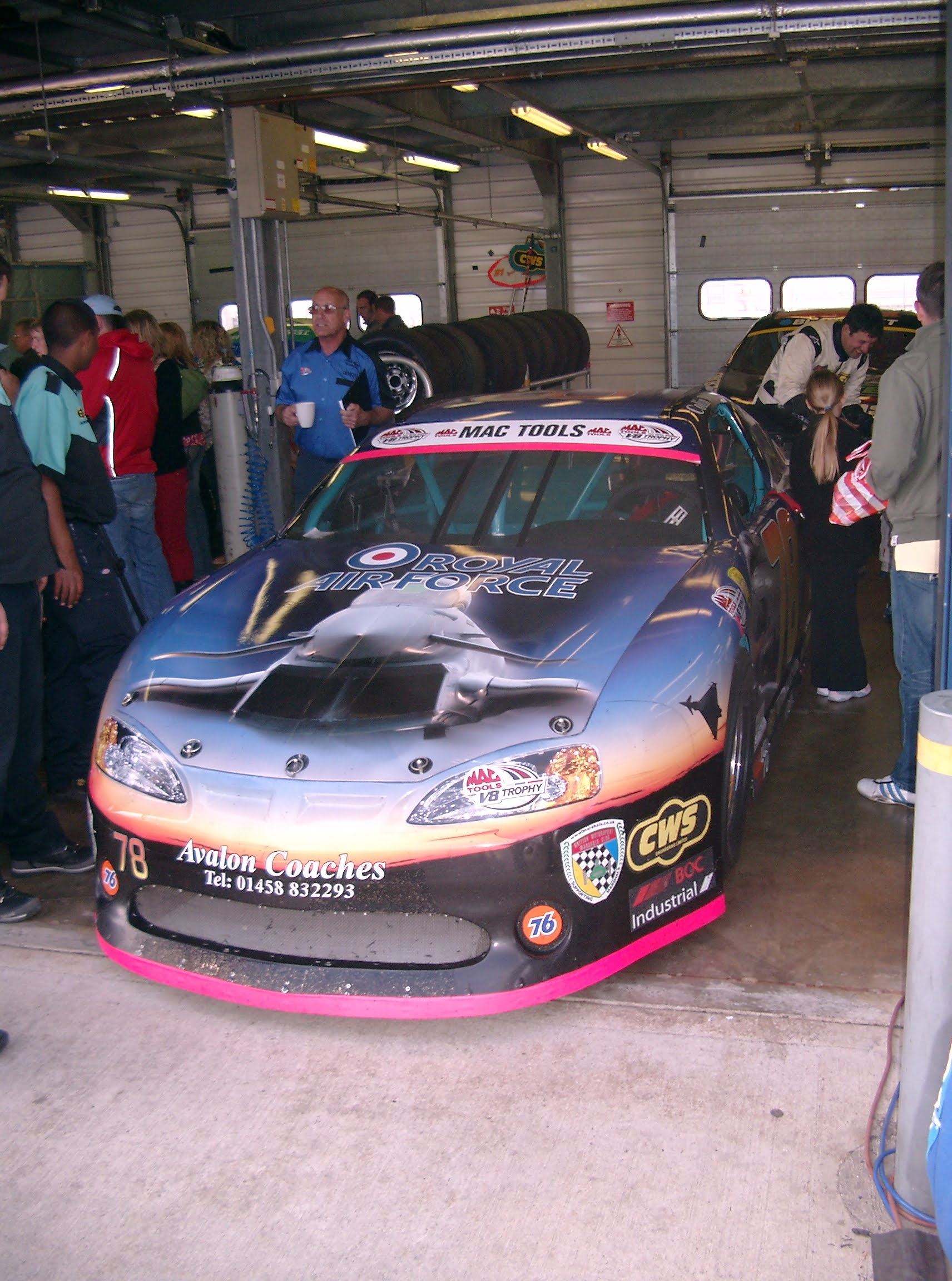
2007 Champion Colin White.

Team	Car	No.	Driver	Rounds
Team Networking	Chevrolet	3	(Spain) Miguel Gomez	1
Team Networking	Chevrolet	3	(United Kingdom) Martin Heath	1
Team Networking	Chevrolet	31	(United Kingdom) Duncan Gray	All
CWS Racing	Chevrolet	7	(United Kingdom) Mark Willis	1
CWS Racing	Chevrolet	26	(United Kingdom) Hunter Abbott	All
CWS Racing	Chevrolet	78	(United Kingdom) Colin White	All
CWS Racing	Chevrolet	79	(United Kingdom) Keith White	All
Team Ranger Racing	Chevrolet	9	(United Kingdom) Pete Wilkinson	2
Steward Racing	Ford	11	(United Kingdom) 'Skid Carrera'	1
Steward Racing	Ford	75	(United Kingdom) John Steward	All
CB Racing	Chevrolet	41	(United Kingdom) Carl Boardley	3
Team Tor Trucks	Pontiac	48	(United Kingdom) Shane Brereton	All
Compton Racing	Pontiac	59	(United Kingdom) Rob Compton	All
Revolution Racing	Chevrolet	95	(Australia) Chris Robinson	3
Revolution Racing	Chevrolet	98	(United Kingdom) Tony Hurdle	All
Revolution Racing	Chevrolet	99	(United Kingdom) Lee O'Keefe	All

== Race calendar ==
All races were held at the Rockingham Motor Speedway in Corby, Northamptonshire.

The season consisted of five meetings of two races each. The grid for the opening race of each meeting was set by a qualifying session with the second race grid being set by the finishing order of the first.

Round		Date	Pole position	Fastest lap	Led most laps	Winning driver	Winning team
1	R1	29 April	(United Kingdom) John Steward	(United Kingdom) Colin White	(United Kingdom) Hunter Abbott	(United Kingdom) Colin White	(United Kingdom) CWS Racing
1	R2	29 April		(United Kingdom) Hunter Abbott	(United Kingdom) Colin White	(United Kingdom) Colin White	(United Kingdom) CWS Racing
2	R3	24 June	Cancelled due to rain.				
2	R4	24 June	Cancelled due to rain.				
3	R5	22 July	(United Kingdom) Hunter Abbott	(United Kingdom) Hunter Abbott	(United Kingdom) Colin White	(United Kingdom) Colin White	(United Kingdom) CWS Racing
3	R6	22 July		(United Kingdom) John Steward	(United Kingdom) Hunter Abbott	(United Kingdom) Hunter Abbott	(United Kingdom) CWS Racing
4	R7	19 August	(United Kingdom) John Steward	(United Kingdom) Colin White	(United Kingdom) Colin White	(United Kingdom) Colin White	(United Kingdom) CWS Racing
4	R8	19 August		(United Kingdom) Colin White	(United Kingdom) Colin White	(United Kingdom) Hunter Abbott	(United Kingdom) CWS Racing
5	R9	16 September	(United Kingdom) John Steward	(United Kingdom) Colin White	(United Kingdom) Colin White	(United Kingdom) Colin White	(United Kingdom) CWS Racing
5	R10	16 September		(United Kingdom) Colin White	(United Kingdom) Lee O'Keefe	(United Kingdom) Lee O'Keefe	(United Kingdom) Revolution Racing

== Final points standings ==
Pos	Driver	R1	R2	R3	R4	R5	R6	R7	R8	R9	R10	Pts
1	(United Kingdom) Colin White	1*	1*	C	C	1*	2*	1*	3*	1*	2*	1940
2	(United Kingdom) Hunter Abbott	2*	2*	C	C	2*	1*	4	1*	4*	3	1905
3	(United Kingdom) Lee O'Keefe	6	5	C	C	5	4	3	2	2	1*	1860
4	(United Kingdom) John Steward	5	3*	C	C	6	3*	2	5*	3	4	1845
5	(United Kingdom) Tony Hurdle	4	4	C	C	3	5*	7	7	5	5	1800
6	(United Kingdom) Duncan Gray	3	11	C	C	4	10*	5	4	9	7	1590
7	(United Kingdom) Keith White	7	6	C	C	8	8	6	8	8	12	1550
8	(United Kingdom) Shane Brereton	11	8	C	C	DNS	6	8	6	7	6	1395
9	(United Kingdom) Rob Compton	8	9	C	C	7	9	10	10	12	10	1335
10	(Australia) Chris Robinson	10	10*	C	C					10	8	990
11	(United Kingdom) Carl Boardley					9	7	9	9	6	13	685
12	(United Kingdom) Pete Wilkinson	9	7							11	11	630
13	(United Kingdom) 'Skid Carrera'									13	9	170
14	(United Kingdom) Mark Willis									15	14	20
15	(United Kingdom) Martin Heath									14	DNS	10
	(Spain) Miguel Gomez	DNS	DNS									
