= Paul Poulter =

British racing driver

- Nationality: (England)
- Debut season: 2005
- Car number: 74
- Engine: Vauxhall C20XE
- Crew chief: Graham 'Chalky' White
- Spotter: Chris Pines
- Championships: 0
- Wins: 11
- Best finish: 1st
- Finished last season: 24th

Paul Poulter is a racing driver. He has raced the #74 pickup since 2005 in the UK Pickup Truck Racing series. In 2008, he signed a contract to drive the #40 Chevrolet Silverado in the Craftsman Truck Series for Key Motorsports, making his debut on 20 June 2008 at the Milwaukee Mile.

Poulter was the Pickup Truck Racing Rockingham Superspeedway Champion and Rookie Champion in 2005, with a total of eight race wins. He is also a past multiple World, European and British Superstox champion.

== Career history ==
- 2008 Pickup Truck Racing Championship, NASCAR Craftsman Truck Series
- 2007 Pickup Truck Racing Championship
- 2006 Pickup Truck Racing Championship
- 2005 Pickup Truck Racing Championship

Pre Pickups

- 2004 Superstox – World & British Champion
- 1996 Pickup Truck Racing – race winner at Baarlo
- 1996 Eurocar V6 – race winner at Mallory Park
- 1995 Superstox – European & British Champion
- 1984 Started racing Ministox
