= Derek Hayes =

British Racecar Driver

- Born: 8 December 1977 (age 48); Dungannon, Northern Ireland

NASCAR O'Reilly Auto Parts Series career
- 3 races run over 1 year
- Best finish: 90th (2003)
- First race: 2003 Sam's Town 250 Benefitting St. Jude (Memphis)
- Last race: 2003 Ford 300 (Homestead)
Wins	Top tens	Poles
0	0	0

Derek Hayes (born 8 December 1977 in Dungannon) is a British former racing driver from Northern Ireland who competed in various series including Formula Palmer Audi, Formula 3 Euroseries, NASCAR Busch Series and British Formula 3. In the latter, he won one race at Brands Hatch on 8 July 2001. He also took part in the 2001 Masters of Formula 3 race. Hayes stopped racing full time after 2004 but returned to karting for the Dan Wheldon Memorial Kart Race in 2011.
