= Michael Vergers =

Dutch racing driver

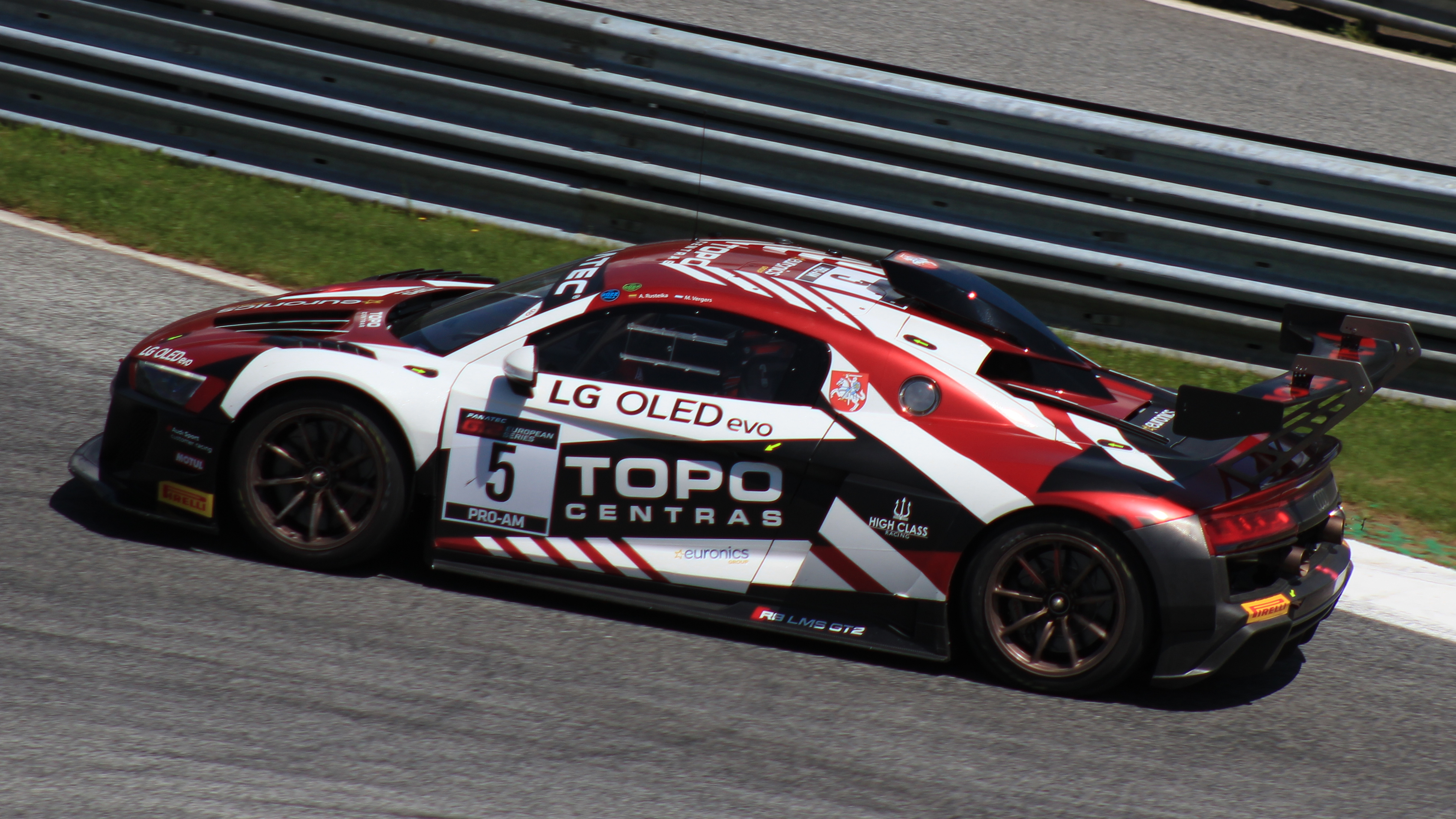
- Vergers' No. 5 car at the Red Bull Ring in 2022
- Nationality: (Netherlands) Dutch
- Born: 24 June 1969 (age 57) Alkmaar, Netherlands
- Categorisation: FIA Silver (until 2026); FIA Bronze (2027–)

ARCA Menards Series career
- 10 races run over 1 year
- Best finish: 21st (2002)
- First race: 2002 Discount Auto Parts 200 (Daytona)
- Last race: 2002 EasyCare Vehicle Services Contracts 100 (Charlotte)
| Wins | Top tens | Poles |
|---|---|---|
| 0 | 4 | 0 |
- Statistics up to date as of November 28, 2024.

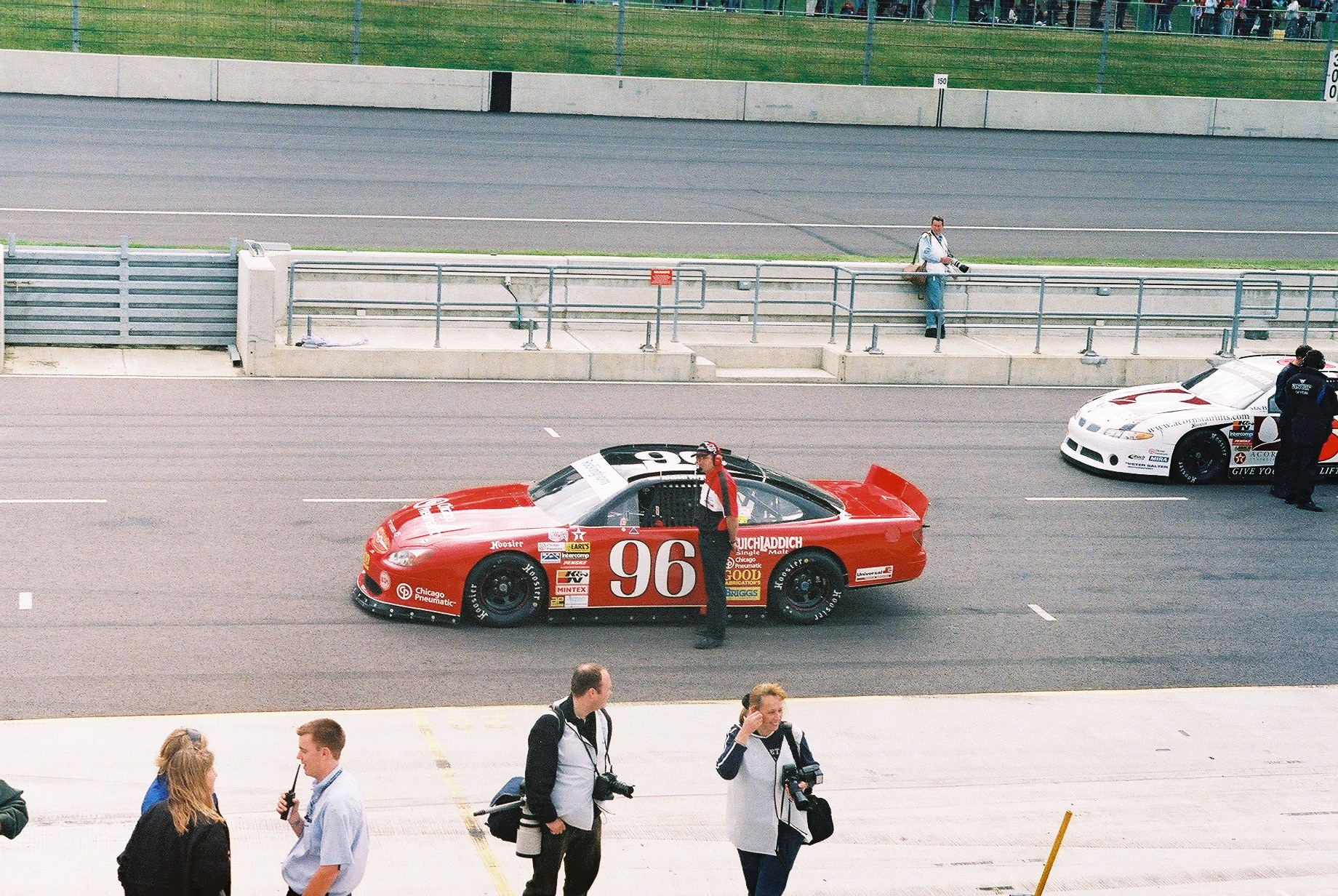
Vergers' Team West-Tec Pontiac at Rockingham during the 2003 ASCAR season

Michael Vergers (born 24 June 1969) is a Dutch professional racing driver who has competed in the ARCA Re/Max Series, the GT2 European Series, and the European Le Mans Series.

Vergers has competed in the 24 Hours of Le Mans from 2006 to 2009, getting a best finish of fifth in LMP2 in 2008.

Vergers has also competed in the American Le Mans Series, the Skip Barber Series, and the Stock Car Speed Association, where he won the championship in 2005.

== Motorsports results ==
=== NASCAR ===
(key) (Bold – Pole position awarded by qualifying time. Italics – Pole position earned by points standings or practice time. * – Most laps led.)

==== Busch Series ====
NASCAR Busch Series results
| Year | Team | No. | Make | 1 | 2 | 3 | 4 | 5 | 6 | 7 | 8 | 9 | 10 | 11 | 12 | 13 | 14 | 15 | 16 | 17 | 18 | 19 | 20 | 21 | 22 | 23 | 24 | 25 | 26 | 27 | 28 | 29 | 30 | 31 | 32 | 33 | 34 | NBSC | Pts | Ref |
|---|---|---|---|---|---|---|---|---|---|---|---|---|---|---|---|---|---|---|---|---|---|---|---|---|---|---|---|---|---|---|---|---|---|---|---|---|---|---|---|---|
| 2002 | Ken Schrader Racing | 07 | Pontiac | DAY | CAR | LVS | DAR | BRI | TEX | NSH | TAL | CAL | RCH | NHA | NZH | CLT | DOV | NSH | KEN | MLW | DAY | CHI | GTY | PPR | IRP | MCH; DNQ | BRI | DAR | RCH; DNQ | DOV | KAN | CLT | MEM | ATL | CAR | PHO | HOM | N/A | 0 | |

=== ARCA Re/Max Series ===
(key) (Bold – Pole position awarded by qualifying time. Italics – Pole position earned by points standings or practice time. * – Most laps led. ** – All laps led.)

ARCA Re/Max Series results
| Year | Team | No. | Make | 1 | 2 | 3 | 4 | 5 | 6 | 7 | 8 | 9 | 10 | 11 | 12 | 13 | 14 | 15 | 16 | 17 | 18 | 19 | 20 | 21 | 22 | ARMSC | Pts | Ref |
|---|---|---|---|---|---|---|---|---|---|---|---|---|---|---|---|---|---|---|---|---|---|---|---|---|---|---|---|---|
| 2002 | Bob Schacht Motorsports | 75 | Ford | DAY; 39 | ATL; 4 | NSH; 34 | SLM; 12 | KEN; 6 | CLT; 14 | KAN | POC; 30 | MCH; 5 | TOL | SBO | KEN | BLN | POC | NSH | ISF | WIN | DSF | CHI | SLM | | | 21st | 1895 | |
| 2002 | Ken Schrader Racing | 99 | Pontiac | | | | | | | | | | | | | | | | | | | | | TAL; 8 | CLT; 37 | 21st | 1895 | |

=== 24 Hours of Le Mans results ===
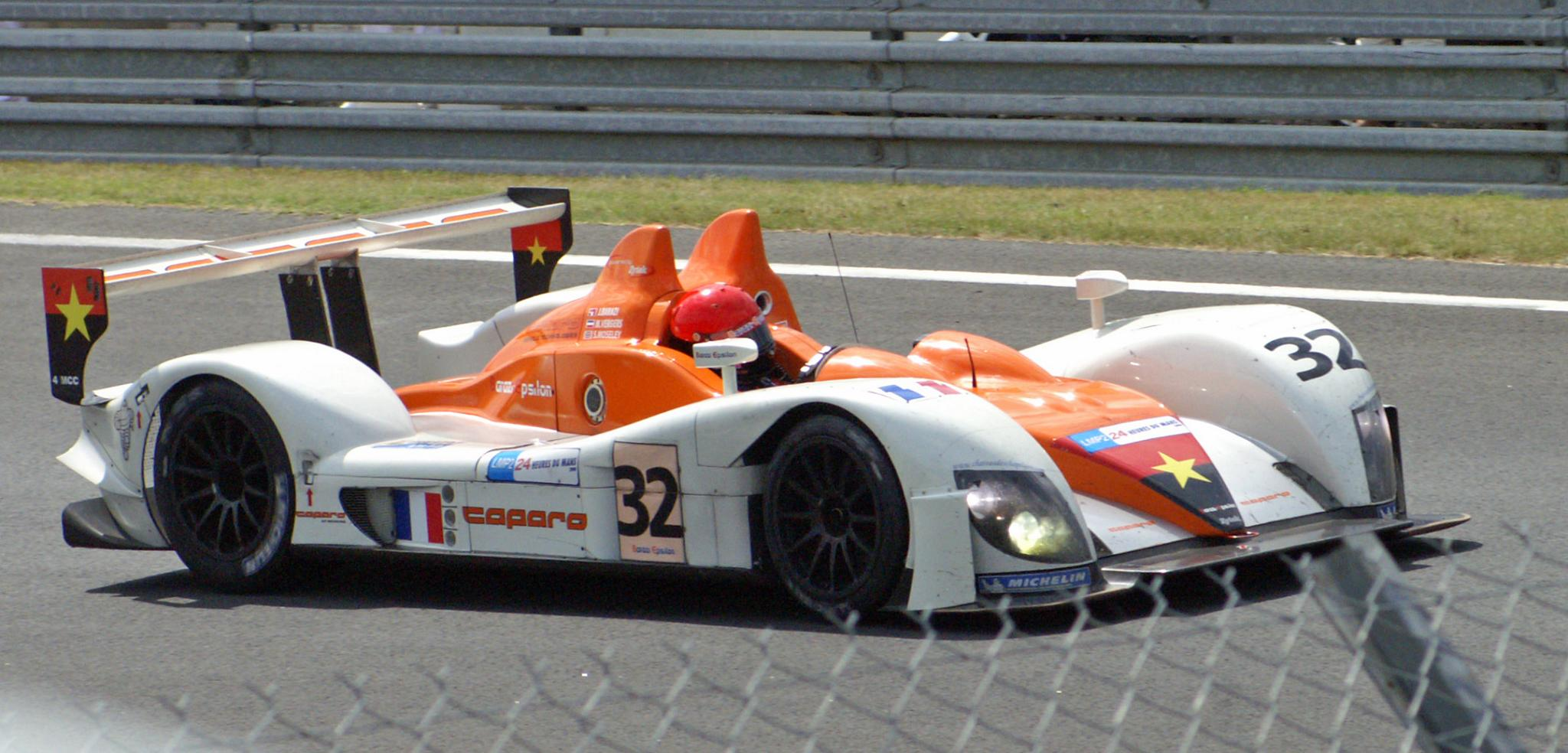
Vergers' Barazi-Epsilon Zytek LMP2 at the 2008 24 Hours of Le Mans

| Year | Team | Co-drivers | Car | Class | Laps | Pos. | Class pos. |
|---|---|---|---|---|---|---|---|
| 2006 | (France) Barazi-Epsilon | (Denmark) Juan Barazi (New Zealand) Neil Cunningham | Courage C65-AER | LMP2 | 294 | 21st | 6th |
| 2007 | (France) Barazi-Epsilon | (Denmark) Juan Barazi (Saudi Arabia) Karim Ojjeh | Zytek 07S/2 | LMP2 | 252 | DNF | DNF |
| 2008 | (France) Barazi-Epsilon | (Denmark) Juan Barazi (United Kingdom) Stuart Moseley | Zytek 07S/2 | LMP2 | 304 | 29th | 5th |
| 2009 | (United Kingdom) Virgo Motorsports | (United Kingdom) Sean McInerney (United Kingdom) Michael McInerney | Ferrari F430 GT2 | GT2 | 280 | 32nd | 10th |

=== Complete GT2 European Series results ===
| Year | Team | Car | Class | 1 | 2 | 3 | 4 | 5 | 6 | 7 | 8 | 9 | 10 | 11 | 12 | Pos. | Points |
|---|---|---|---|---|---|---|---|---|---|---|---|---|---|---|---|---|---|
| 2021 | Speed Factory Racing | Porsche 911 GT2 RS Clubsport | Pro-Am | MON; QR; 3 | MON; CR; 3 | HOC; QR; 4 | HOC; CR; 3 | MIS; QR; 4 | MIS; CR; 8 | SPA; QR; 2 | SPA; CR; Ret | LEC; QR; 10 | LEC; CR; 8 | | | 3rd | 120 |
| 2022 | High Class Racing | Audi R8 LMS GT2 | Pro-Am | IMO; QR; 3 | IMO; CR; 2 | RBR; QR; Ret | RBR; CR; 11 | MIS; QR; 4 | MIS; CR; 7 | SPA; QR; 6 | SPA; CR; 4 | VAL; QR; 7 | VAL; CR; 3 | LEC; QR; 5 | LEC; QR; 7† | 5th | 137 |
