= John Mickel (racing driver) =

British racing driver

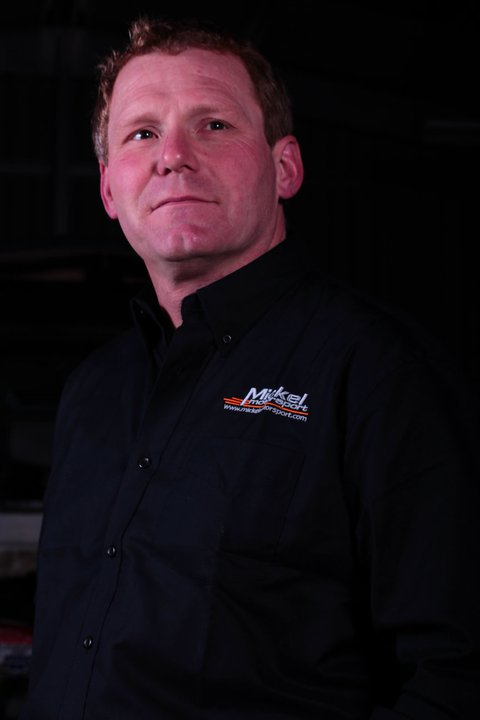
- Mickel in 2011
- Nationality: (England) English
- Born: 28 January 1971 (age 55) Cambridge, England

Pickup Truck Racing Series career
- Debut season: 2008
- Former teams: TorqueSpeed
- Wins: 0
- Poles: 0
- Finished last season: 23rd

Previous series
- 2004: ASA Series

NASCAR FedEx Freight Truck Series career
- 7 races run over 4 years
- 2008 position: 98th
- Best finish: 43rd (2006)
- First race: 2005 Silverado 350K (Texas)
- Last race: 2008 North Carolina Education Lottery 200 (Charlotte)
Wins	Top tens	Poles
0	0	0
- Statistics up to date as of 20 July 2020.

John Mickel (born 28 January 1971) is a British professional stock car racing driver and commentator. He has raced in the NASCAR Craftsman Truck Series in the United States and the Pickup Truck Racing Series in the United Kingdom. He was also a commentator for Sky Sports' coverage of NASCAR racing in 2008 and 2009.

== Racing career ==
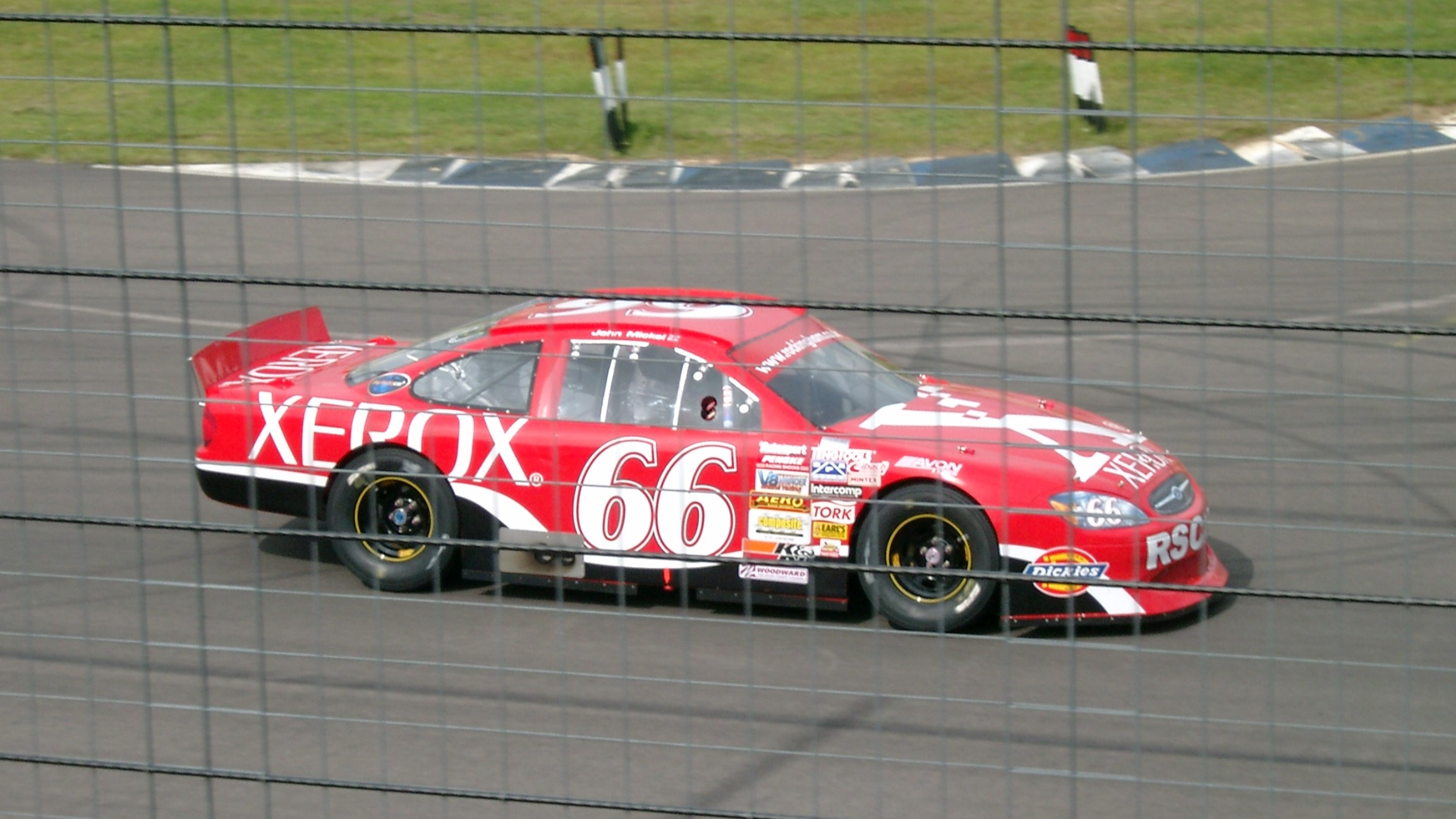
Mickel competing for the TorqueSpeed team at Rockingham in 2004.

Mickel, a second-generation driver, began racing at the age of ten in Ministox and won his first championship two years later. He soon moved to Superstox where he was named both World and European champion. He joined the SCSA-Europe tour in its inaugural year in 2001, where he won the series' first championship.

In 2002, Mickel began racing part-time in the United States in NASCAR. After failing to qualify for two races in the Craftsman Truck Series in the No. 09 for Midgley Racing, he began racing in the American Speed Association in 2004. He also planned to make his Nextel Cup Series debut that same year in Travis Carter's No. 66 car for the renamed TorqueSpeed Carter team in select races throughout the season, but the deal fell through. In 2005, Mickel returned to the Truck Series and did make his debut in the series after qualifying for the race at Texas, driving the No. 4 Dodge Ram for Bobby Hamilton Racing, starting 35th and finishing 29th. Mickel had attempted to make one other start that season for Hamilton's team at Atlanta in the team's No. 05 truck, but failed to qualify, in part because it was a fifth part-time team for BHR with no owner points. The next season, he ran the final five races of the Truck Series schedule leasing owner's points and equipment from the No. 07 Green Light Racing Chevrolet. His best finish was a 20th at Atlanta. He was scheduled to run with Green Light full-time in 2007, but instead Tim Sauter got the ride. During preseason testing at Daytona International Speedway, Speed had reported that Mickel would instead begin the season in the No. 63 MB Motorsports truck, and the sponsorship he brought would allow him and the team to run the full season, but this did not end up happening.

For 2008 and 2009, Mickel raced in selected rounds of the U.K. Pickup Truck Racing Series. He ran the multi-race winning truck of Paul Poulter but with a different engine.

On 31 January 2010, Mickel won the inaugural ASA Transcontinental Series Free State 500 at Phakisa Freeway near Welkom, South Africa in a Chevrolet Monte Carlo, having qualified fourth for the 207-lap 500-km race. He took the lead on the last lap after a close and clean race.

In March 2010, Mickel (as Mickel Motorsport) started the 2010 UK CPC Legends Cars season in car No. 4, also running car No. 14 (the CPC sponsored car, driven by Paul Musselle) and car No. 39 (driven by Jess Gwynne).

On 28 March 2010, it was announced that Mickel would make his NASCAR comeback, returning to the Truck Series again with the TorqueSpeed team, but running by themselves instead of partnering with SS-Green Light or another existing team. No other details were announced besides the fact that the team would run a part-time schedule of around ten races that year with a full season run planned in 2011. This also never ended up happening, and Mickel would not make another start in NASCAR.

== Career history ==
- 2019 Legends Racing UK - 3rd place
- 2018 Legends Racing UK - Champion (becomes UK career top points scorer)
- 2017 Legends Racing UK - Champion
- 2016 Legends Racing UK - Champion
- 2015 Legends Racing UK - Champion
- 2013 Legends Racing UK - 2nd place
- 2012 Legends Racing UK - 3rd place
- 2011 Legends Racing UK
- 2010 CPC Legends Racing UK - 4th Placed Overall
- 2006 NASCAR Craftsman Truck SS-Green Light Racing
- 2005 NASCAR Craftsman Truck Atlanta Motorspeedway Texas Motorway Speedway
- 2004 ASA races Charlotte & Atlanta Raced British built SCSA car (shipped from the UK)
- 2001-2006 SCSA-Europe Inaugural Champion in 2001
- 1999-2001 Legends Car Championships Champion - World and British Legends Cars Champion - World Series Legends Cars World Legends Champion (Sears Point, CA)

== Motorsports career results ==
=== NASCAR ===
(key) (Bold – Pole position awarded by qualifying time. Italics – Pole position earned by points standings or practice time. * – Most laps led.)

==== Craftsman Truck Series ====
NASCAR Craftsman Truck Series results
Year	Team	No.	Make	1	2	3	4	5	6	7	8	9	10	11	12	13	14	15	16	17	18	19	20	21	22	23	24	25	NCTC	Pts	Ref
2002	Midgley Racing	09	Chevy	DAY	DAR	MAR	GTY	PPR	DOV	TEX	MEM	MLW	KAN	KEN	NHA	MCH	IRP	NSH	RCH	TEX	SBO	LVS	CAL	PHO; DNQ	HOM; DNQ				N/A	0	
2005	Bobby Hamilton Racing	05	Dodge	DAY	CAL	ATL	MAR	GTY	MFD	CLT	DOV	TEX	MCH	MLW	KAN	KEN	MEM	IRP	NSH	BRI	RCH	NHA	LVS	MAR	ATL; DNQ				81st	76	
2005	Bobby Hamilton Racing	4	Dodge																							TEX; 29	PHO	HOM	81st	76	
2006	Green Light Racing	07	Chevy	DAY	CAL	ATL	MAR	GTY	CLT	MFD	DOV	TEX	MCH	MLW	KAN	KEN	MEM	IRP	NSH	BRI	NHA	LVS	TAL	MAR; 31	ATL; 20	TEX; 25	PHO; 25	HOM; 29	43rd	430	
2008	SS-Green Light Racing	07	Chevy	DAY	CAL	ATL	MAR	KAN	CLT; 31	MFD	DOV	TEX	MCH	MLW	MEM	KEN	IRP	NSH	BRI	GTY	NHA	LVS	TAL	MAR	ATL	TEX	PHO	HOM	98th	70	

Awards and achievements
Preceded by none	ASCAR Champion; 2001	Succeeded by Nicolas Minassian
