= Mark Proctor (racing driver) =

British racing driver (born 1968)

- Nationality: (United Kingdom) British
- Born: 9 December 1968 (age 57)

Previous series
- 2005: British Touring Car Championship

Mark James Proctor (born 9 December 1968 in Bridlington, East Riding of Yorkshire) is a British former racing driver who competed in a wide range of championships. In the mid-1990s, he raced rallycross, twice coming second in his class in the British Rallycross Championship. In 1996 he switched to Eurocar BV8 series, coming second in 1998 and fifth in the following two seasons.

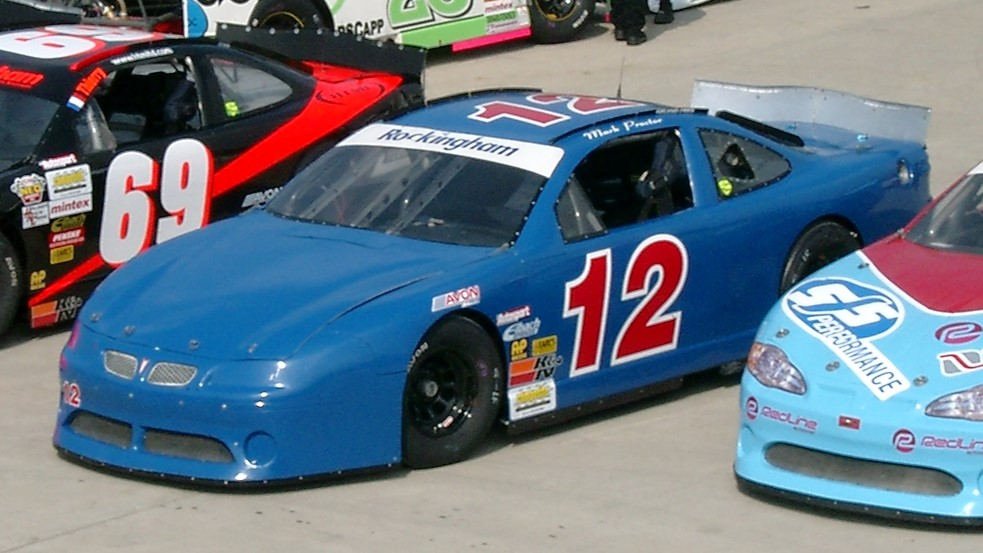
Proctor's #12 Pontiac in the paddock at Rockingham in 2004.

In 2001, the ASCAR series brought US-style stock car racing to a wider UK audience, and Proctor was a stalwart driver for several seasons, finishing in the series top-ten three times.

However for 2005, Proctor entered the British Touring Car Championship for the first time, for the small Fast-Tec team in an ex-Rob Collard Vauxhall Astra, finishing 15th overall. For 2006 the team bought a Honda Civic that had won races the previous season in the hands of Tom Chilton, but was not competitive and pulled out after five rounds due to a lack of motivation. He made a return a month later at Snetterton, and continued at Knockhill. He scored points in four of the six races at those two rounds, but entered no further BTCC rounds.

In 2009, Proctor competed in the Ginetta G50 Cup, winning the Chairman's Cup for drivers over 40 in round 1, but suffered a huge crash in the second race at Oulton Park which caused it to be postponed. He slammed into the stationary car of Carl Breeze, which had spun and lay side-on in the middle of the circuit, at close to full speed. Both drivers received medical treatment but although Breeze suffered no serious injuries, Proctor suffered a fractured L4 vertebra.

Proctor confirmed his immediate retirement from racing upon medical advice in an interview with Louise Goodman on ITV4's coverage of the BTCC from Croft.

Proctor has two children, one of whom (Senna) is also a racing driver.

== Racing record ==
=== Complete British Touring Car Championship results ===
(key) (Races in bold indicate pole position – 1 point awarded just in first race) (Races in italics indicate fastest lap – 1 point awarded all races) (* signifies that driver lead race for at least one lap – 1 point awarded all races)

Year	Team	Car	1	2	3	4	5	6	7	8	9	10	11	12	13	14	15	16	17	18	19	20	21	22	23	24	25	26	27	28	29	30	DC	Pts
2005	Fast-Tec Motorsport	Vauxhall Astra Coupé	DON; 1; 10	DON; 2 Ret	DON; 3; 10	THR; 1	THR; 2	THR; 3	BRH; 1 Ret	BRH; 2 DNS	BRH; 3; 8	OUL; 1; 12	OUL; 2; 8	OUL; 3 Ret	CRO; 1 Ret	CRO; 2 DNS	CRO; 3 DNS	MON; 1; 14	MON; 2 Ret	MON; 3; 10	SNE; 1; 12	SNE; 2 Ret	SNE; 3; 11	KNO; 1; 13	KNO; 2; 10	**KNO**; **3**; 10	SIL; 1 Ret	SIL; 2; 9	SIL; 3; 12	BRH; 1 NC	BRH; 2 Ret	BRH; 3; 13	15th	13
2006	Fast-Tec Motorsport	Honda Civic Type-R	BRH; 1 Ret	BRH; 2 Ret	BRH; 3 DNS	MON; 1; 12	MON; 2; 8	**MON**; **3** Ret	OUL; 1; 13	OUL; 2; 11	OUL; 3; 13	THR; 1 DNS	THR; 2 DNS	THR; 3 DNS	CRO; 1 Ret	CRO; 2; 14	CRO; 3 Ret	DON; 1	DON; 2	DON; 3	SNE; 1; 8	SNE; 2; 11	SNE; 3; 9	KNO; 1; 9	KNO; 2; 6	**KNO**; **3**; 8	BRH; 1	BRH; 2	BRH; 3	SIL; 1	SIL; 2	SIL; 3	16th	18
