= Team West-Tec =

(United Kingdom) Team West-Tec
- Founded: 1988
- Founder(s): Gavin Wills
- Base: Corby, Northamptonshire, England
- Team principal(s): Gavin Wills; John Miller
- Former series: Euroformula Open; British Formula 3 FIA Formula 3 European Championship; British LMP3 Cup; ASCAR Racing Series
- Teams' Championships: 2011 European F3 Open
- Drivers' Championships: ASCAR Racing Series 2005 (Vergers); ASCAR Racing Series 2006 (Playle); 2009 European F3 Open Copa Class (MacLeod); 2011 European F3 Open Copa Class (Gamberini); 2013 European F3 Open (Jones)
- Website: http://www.teamwest-tec.com/

Team West-Tec F3 is a motor racing team owned by Gavin Wills and John Miller based in Corby in the United Kingdom, the most successful team in the history of the European F3 Open Championship, it also won two drivers championships in the ASCAR Racing Series.

== History ==
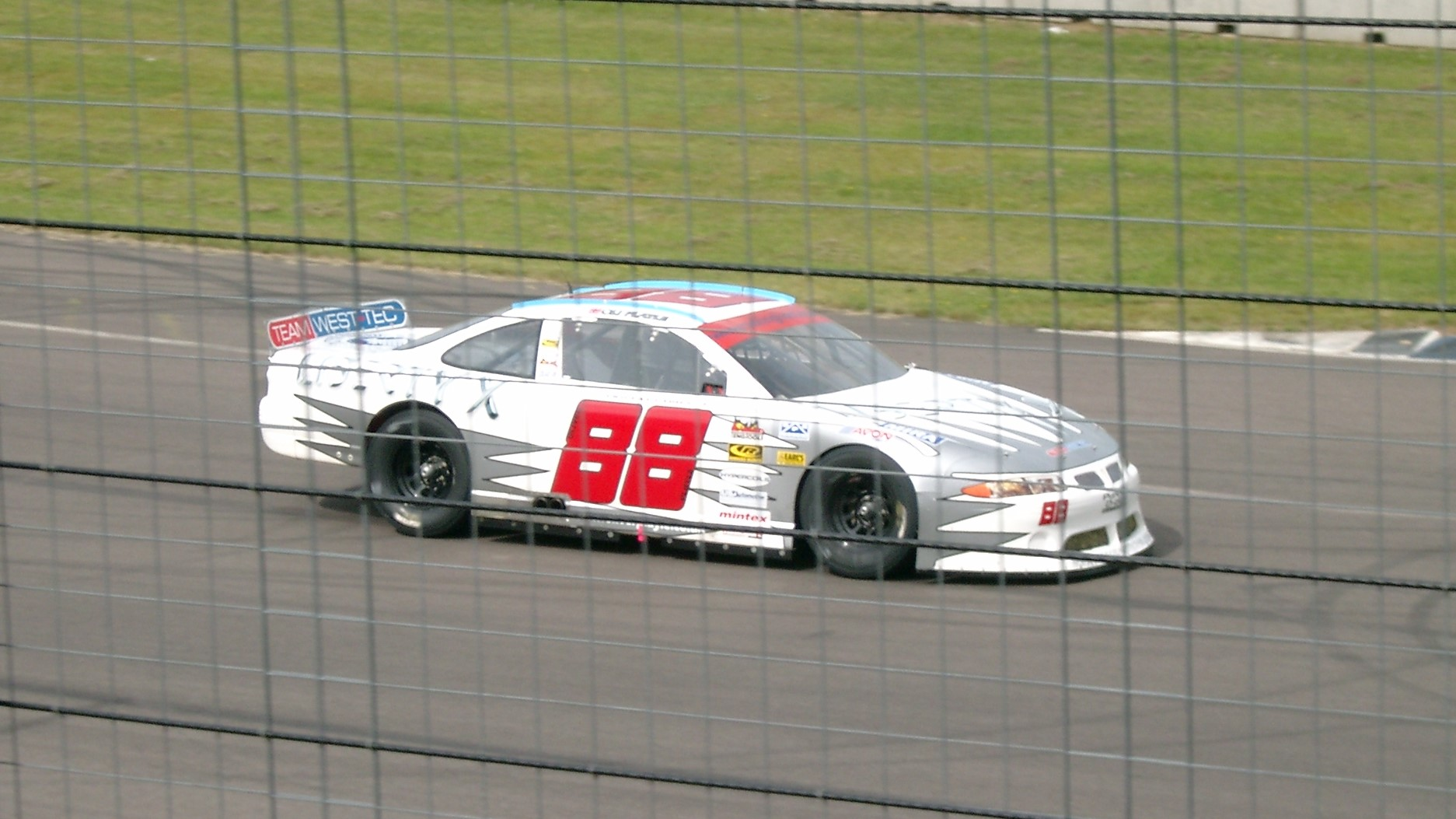
Team West-Tec car of Oli Playle competing at Rockingham in 2004.

From 2001 to 2006 the team took part in the ASCAR Racing Series which was mainly based locally at the Rockingham Motor Speedway. The team took two consecutive drivers titles in 2005 and 2006 with Michael Vergers and Oli Playle.

In 2007 Team West-Tec F3 became the first British team to compete in the Spanish Formula Three Championship, purchasing assets from leading GP2 team Racing Engineering. In 2009 the series was renamed the European F3 Open. Since 2007 the team has taken 44 wins and 116 podiums and three championship titles – including winning the support race at the 2008 European Grand Prix at Valencia.

In 2009 the team also returned to British Formula 3 International Series completing a full campaign with Max Snegirev as well as part campaigns for Mathieu Maurage, Miky Faccin, Jay Bridger and Ma Qinghua.

In 2010 the team continued in the European F3 Open but primarily used their British F3 cars for testing with drivers from F1, GP2 and GP3 – where young drivers get very little track time to develop and hone their skills. However the team continued to make occasional British F3 race starts and took a national class win with young Mexican, Juan Carlos Sistos on his series debut at Silverstone.

The team also announced a plan to form a new joint venture with China's motorsport team, Champ Racing, to enter an additional car under the banner of "Champ Motorsport with Team West-Tec". This venture started in September 2010 with experienced driver Michael Ho racing at Brands Hatch, Monza, Jerez and Barcelona. In his second race weekend, at Monza, Ho took third place in the Copa class, fifth overall.

The team was successful in the European F3 Open in 2010, challenging at the front in both classes and winning races with more than one driver, eventually finishing as runner-up in both the driver's and teams' championships.

For 2011 the European F3 Open team featured four full-season drivers in Victor Corrêa, Fabio Gamberini, Luca Orlandi and Sam Dejonghe, plus a number of other drivers racing on part programmes during the year such as Fahmi Ilyas, Kotaro Sakurai and Tatiana Calderón.

The 2011 season was also successful. Victor Corrêa won two races and Fahmi Ilyas one in the team's newest Dallara F308s, Ilyas having made a debut at Brands Hatch in the car later used by Tatiana Calderón who scored points at Barcelona after she stepped up from Star Mazda in the USA. Fabio Gamberini also won a race outright at Spa and also won an impressive ten times in the Copa class, where he was champion as well as being third overall. Sam Dejonghe twice featured on the overall podium and took four Copa class wins to finish as Copa runner-up and Luca Orlandi, despite missing two races, secured third in Copa for an unprecedented 1-2-3 for the team. Kotaro Sakurai featured on the Brands Hatch Copa podium in Luca's place on his debut in the series. The team won the overall 2011 Teams' Championship.

For 2012, Sam Dejonghe returned with a single win before being dropped at the end of the year, to be replaced by Ed Jones. Manu Bejarano started the season but stopped with no budget after two rounds, although Roberto La Rocca, from Venezuela, joined the team. Jordan Oon and Luca Orlandi drove the team's Copa F308 entries, with Orlandi replaced by Kiwi Chris Vlok after an injury at Brands Hatch. After a much improved end to 2012, with Dejonghe and new signing Ed Jones taking second place at each of the last three meetings, Team West-Tec F3 remained the most successful team in the history of the series.

Team West-Tec had eight drivers in 2013, with Ed Jones winning the championship and Nelson Mason and finishing third. Two further F312 cars were campaigned by Orlandi and La Rocca. The team also operated four Copa F308 cars for Sean (son of Tom) Walkinshaw, South African Liam Venter, Chinaman Huan Zhu and young British driver Cameron Twynham.

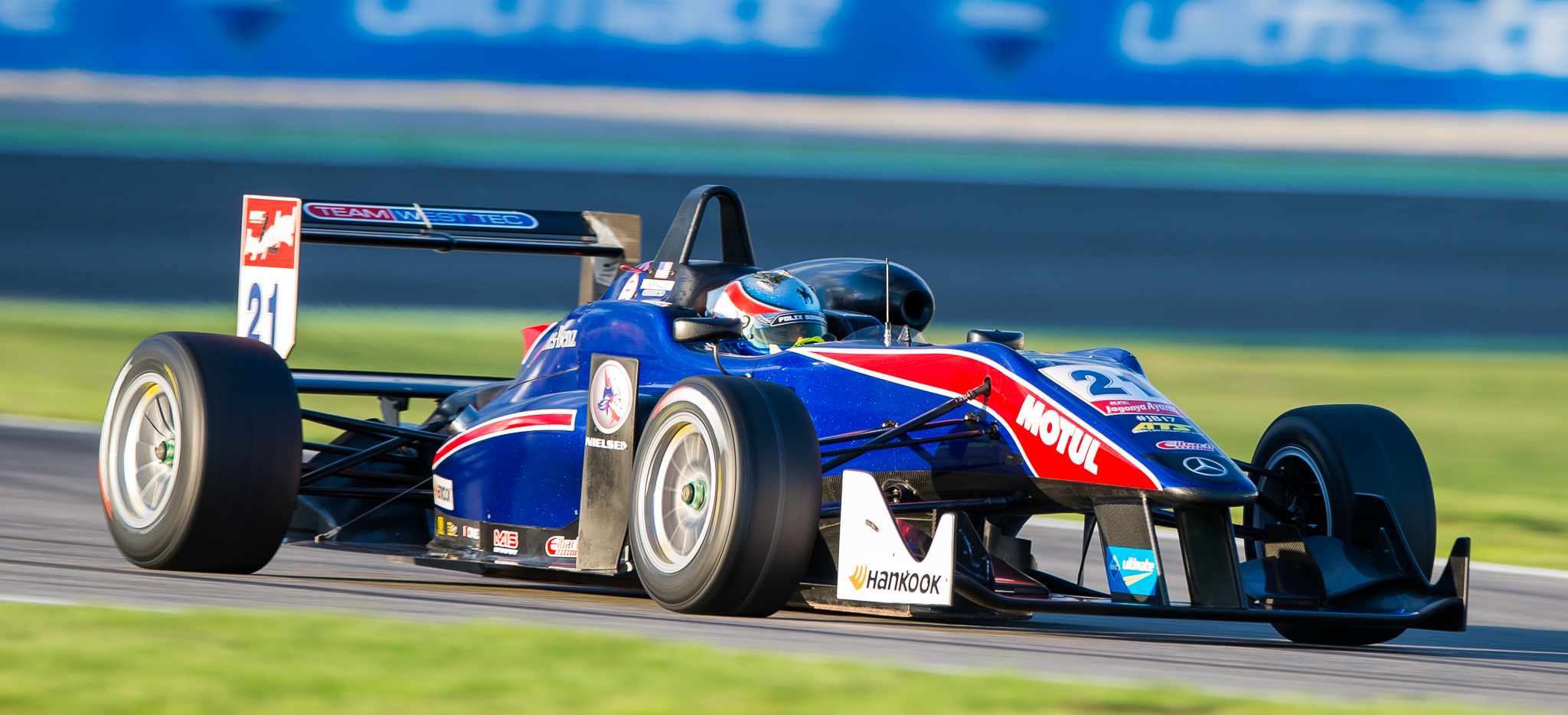
Félix Serrallés competing in the 2014 FIA F3 European season at Hockenheim.

Team West-Tec F3 also returned with a three-car team to the reorganised British F3 series in 2013. Ed Jones took five wins from the twelve races in the second tier National Class.

In 2014, Yarin Stern, Tanart Sathienthirakul and Wei Fung Thong raced full-time for West-Tec in the renamed Euroformula Open. Nici Pohler did all rounds bar the final at Barcelona due to illness and was replaced by Fabian Schiller. Stern managed to grab the team 5 podiums over the year.

2014 also saw the beginning of West Tec's attack on the incredibly competitive FIA European F3 Championship with Felix Serralles taking on the whole season while Hector Hurst and Macau's Andy Chang split the season between each other.

== Former series results ==
=== British Formula 3 ===
Class B
Year	Car	Drivers	Races	Wins	Poles	F/Laps	Points	D.C.
1991	Reynard 893 Volkswagen	(United Kingdom) Thornton Mustard	3	0	0	0	1	14th
British Formula Three Championship
2009	Mygale M-09F3 Mugen-Honda	(United Kingdom) Jay Bridger	2	0	0	0	28	15th†
National Class
2009	Dallara F306 Mugen-Honda	(Russia) Max Snegirev	14	0	0	0	108	4th
2009	Dallara F306 Mugen-Honda	(France) Mathieu Maurage	2	0	0	0	12	9th
2009	Dallara F306 Mugen-Honda	(China) Qinghua Ma	2	0	0	0	10	10th
2009	Dallara F306 Mugen-Honda	(Italy) Michele Faccin	2	0	0	0	20	8th
2010	Dallara F306 Mugen-Honda	(Brazil) Luiz Razia	3	0	0	0	23	4th
2010	Dallara F306 Mugen-Honda	(Mexico) Juan Carlos Sistos	6	1	0	0	72	3rd
Rookie Class
2011	Dallara F306 Mugen-Honda	(Italy) Luca Orlandi	3	1	0	0	45	3rd
National Class
2013	Dallara F312 Toyota	(Venezuela) Roberto La Rocca	3	0	0	0	33	7th
2013	Dallara F312 Toyota	(New Zealand) Chris Vlok	12	1	0	0	121	2nd
2013	Dallara F312 Toyota	(China) Huan Zhu	3	0	0	0	19	10th
2013	Dallara F312 Toyota	(Australia) Jordan Oon	3	0	0	0	45	5th
2013	Dallara F312 Toyota	(United Kingdom) Ed Jones	6	5	0	0	103	3rd
2013	Dallara F308 Toyota	(United Kingdom) Cameron Twynham	6	0	0	0	82	4th
2013	Dallara F308 Toyota	(Colombia) William Barbosa	3	0	0	0	38	6th
2013	Dallara F308 Toyota	(United Kingdom) Sean Walkinshaw	3	0	0	0	20	9th
2013	Dallara F308 Toyota	(South Africa) Liam Venter	3	0	0	0	23	8th

† Shared results with Bridger Motorsport

=== Spanish Formula 3/European F3 Open/Euroformula Open ===
Spanish Formula 3 Championship
Year	Car	Drivers	Races	Wins	Poles	F/Laps	Points	D.C.	T.C.
2007	Dallara F300-FPT	(United Kingdom) Andy Merrick [C]	0	0	0	0	0	N/A [C]	9th
2007	Dallara F300-FPT	(Norway) Christian Ebbesvik [C]	16	7	0	0	118	1st [C]	9th
2007	Dallara F300-FPT; Dallara F306-FPT	(South Africa) Sean Petterson	6	0	0	0	2	19th	9th
2008	Dallara F306-FPT	(United Kingdom) Alex Waters [C]	4	0	0	0	0	N/A [C]	7th
2008	Dallara F306-FPT	(China) Qinghua Ma [C]	11	0	0	0	24	7th [C]	7th
2008	Dallara F306-FPT	(Norway) Christian Ebbesvik	17	2	1	0	39	10th	7th
2008	Dallara F308-FPT	(Norway) Christian Ebbesvik	17	2	1	0	39	10th	7th
2008	Dallara F300-FPT	(Portugal) Francisco Villar [C]	16	0	0	0	13	13th [C]	7th
2008	Dallara F300-FPT	(United Kingdom) Jonathan Legris [C]	17	3	0	0	76	3rd [C]	7th
European F3 Open Championship
2009	Dallara F306-FPT	(Iceland) Kristján Einar [C]	12	0	0	0	20	9th [C]	5th
2009	Dallara F306-FPT	(Australia) Tom Tweedie [C]	2	0	0	0	0	16th [C]	5th
2009	Dallara F306-FPT	(United Kingdom) Callum MacLeod [C]	16	7	0	0	106	1st [C]	5th
2009	Dallara F308-FPT	(Norway) Christian Ebbesvik	16	1	1	1	63	5th	5th
2010	Dallara F308-Toyota	(United Kingdom) Callum MacLeod	14	3	1	1	112	2nd	2nd
2010	Dallara F306-Toyota	(Spain) Ramón Piñeiro [C]	2	0	0	0	8	10th [C]	2nd
2010	Dallara F306-Toyota	(Iceland) Kristján Einar [C]	2	0	0	0	4	11th [C]	2nd
2010	Dallara F306-Toyota	(Macau) Michael Ho [C]	8	0	0	0	28	6th [C]	2nd
2010	Dallara F306-Toyota	(Brazil) Victor Corrêa [C]	14	2	0	0	62	5th [C]	2nd
2011	Dallara F308-Toyota	(Brazil) Victor Corrêa	16	2	0	0	59	6th	1st
2011	Dallara F308-Toyota	(Malaysia) Fahmi Ilyas	4	1	2	1	30	12th	1st
2011	Dallara F308-Toyota	(Colombia) Tatiana Calderón	6	0	0	0	3	21st	1st
2011	Dallara F306-Toyota	(Italy) Luca Orlandi [C]	16	0	0	0	62	3rd [C]	1st
2011	Dallara F306-Toyota	(Japan) Kotaro Sakurai [C]	2	0	0	0	6	8th [C]	1st
2011	Dallara F306-Toyota	(Belgium) Sam Dejonghe [C]	18	4	0	0	118	2nd [C]	1st
2011	Dallara F306-Toyota	(Brazil) Fabio Gamberini [C]	18	10	0	0	130	1st [C]	1st
2012	Dallara F312-Toyota	(Belgium) Sam Dejonghe	14	1	0	1	159	5th	4th
2012	Dallara F312-Toyota	(United Arab Emirates) Ed Jones [G]	2	0	0	0	0	N/A	4th
2012	Dallara F312-Toyota	(Spain) Manuel Bejarano	4	0	0	0	14	16th	4th
2012	Dallara F312-Toyota	(Venezuela) Roberto La Rocca	12	0	0	0	44	10th	4th
2012	Dallara F308-Toyota	(Italy) Luca Orlandi [C]	9	0	0	0	10	10th [C]	4th
2012	Dallara F308-Toyota	(New Zealand) Chris Vlok [C]	2	0	0	0	3	13th [C]	4th
2012	Dallara F308-Toyota	(Australia) Jordan Oon [C]	16	0	0	0	50	5th [C]	4th
2013	Dallara F312-Toyota	(Venezuela) Roberto La Rocca	6	0	0	0	15	14th	2nd
2013	Dallara F312-Toyota	(United Kingdom) Emil Bernstorff	2	0	0	0	6	20th	2nd
2013	Dallara F312-Toyota	(United Kingdom) Jonathan Legris	2	0	0	0	1	30th	2nd
2013	Dallara F312-Toyota	(United States) Spencer Pigot	2	0	0	0	10	16th	2nd
2013	Dallara F312-Toyota	(United Arab Emirates) Ed Jones	14	6	4	3	256	1st	2nd
2013	Dallara F312-Toyota	(Canada) Nelson Mason	16	3	4	4	159	3rd	2nd
2013	Dallara F312-Toyota	(Italy) Luca Orlandi	8	0	0	0	1	29th	2nd
2013	Dallara F312-Toyota	(Norway) Falco Wauer [G]	2	0	0	0	0	N/A	2nd
2013	Dallara F312-Toyota	(United Kingdom) Hector Hurst [G]	2	0	0	0	0	N/A	2nd
2013	Dallara F308-Toyota; Dallara F312-Toyota	(China) Huan Zhu	16	0	0	0	2	27th	2nd
2013	Dallara F308-Toyota	(United Kingdom) Sean Walkinshaw [C]	16	0	0	0	19	9th [C]	2nd
2013	Dallara F308-Toyota	(United Kingdom) Cameron Twynham [C]	16	2	0	0	19	2nd [C]	2nd
2013	Dallara F308-Toyota	(South Africa) Liam Venter [C]	13	1	0	0	31	6th [C]	2nd
2013	Dallara F308-Toyota	(Austria) Christopher Höher [C]	2	0	0	0	0	15th [C]	2nd
Euroformula Open Championship
2014	Dallara F312-Toyota	(Israel) Yarin Stern	16	0	0	0	125	5th	3rd
2014	Dallara F312-Toyota	(United Kingdom) Cameron Twynham	8	0	0	0	53	9th	3rd
2014	Dallara F312-Toyota	(Poland) Igor Waliłko [G]	2	0	0	0	0	N/A	3rd
2014	Dallara F312-Toyota	(Germany) Nicolas Pohler	14	0	0	0	38	12th	3rd
2014	Dallara F312-Toyota	(Germany) Fabian Schiller [G]	2	0	0	0	0	N/A	3rd
2014	Dallara F312-Toyota	(Thailand) Tanart Sathienthirakul	16	0	0	0	69	7th	3rd
2014	Dallara F312-Toyota	(Hong Kong) Wei Fung Thong	16	0	0	0	16	18th	3rd
2015	Dallara F312-Toyota	(Israel) Yarin Stern	16	0	1	0	119	5th	4th
2015	Dallara F312-Toyota	(India) Mahaveer Raghunathan [G]	2	0	0	0	0	N/A	4th
2015	Dallara F312-Toyota	(United Kingdom) Sam MacLeod [G]	2	0	0	0	0	N/A	4th
2015	Dallara F312-Toyota	(Thailand) Tanart Sathienthirakul	16	0	0	0	133	4th	4th
2016	Dallara F312-Toyota	(China) Liang Jiatong	4	0	0	0	0	28th	9th

=== FIA Formula 3 European Championship ===
FIA Formula 3 European Championship
Year	Car	Drivers	Races	Wins	Poles	F/Laps	Points	D.C.	T.C.
2014	Dallara F314-Mercedes	(Puerto Rico) Félix Serrallés	33	0	0	0	82	12th	6th
2014	Dallara F312-Mercedes	(United Kingdom) Hector Hurst	24	0	0	0	3	24th	6th
2014	Dallara F312-Mercedes	(Macau) Wing Chung Chang	9	0	0	0	0	30th	6th
2015	Dallara F312-Mercedes	(Germany) Fabian Schiller	33	0	0	0	2	25th	9th
2015	Dallara F314-Mercedes	(South Africa) Raoul Hyman	33	0	0	0	14.5	21st	9th
