= List of 2009 motorsport champions =

2009 motorsport champions
Previous: 2008	Next: 2010

This list of 2009 motorsport champions is a list of national or international auto racing series with a Championship decided by the points or positions earned by a driver from multiple races.

== Air racing ==
Series	Pilot	Refer
Red Bull Air Race World Championship	(United Kingdom) Paul Bonhomme	2009 Red Bull Air Race World Championship

== Dirt oval racing ==
Series	Champion	Refer
Lucas Oil Late Model Dirt Series	(United States) Scott Bloomquist	
World of Outlaws Late Model Series	(United States) Josh Richards	
World of Outlaws Sprint Car Series	(United States) Donny Schatz	
World of Outlaws Sprint Car Series	Teams: (United States) Tony Stewart Racing	

== Drag racing ==
Series	Champion	Refer
NHRA Full Throttle Drag Racing Series	Top Fuel: (United States) Tony Schumacher	2009 NHRA Full Throttle Drag Racing Series season
NHRA Full Throttle Drag Racing Series	Funny Car: (United States) Robert Hight	2009 NHRA Full Throttle Drag Racing Series season
NHRA Full Throttle Drag Racing Series	Pro Stock: (United States) Mike Edwards	2009 NHRA Full Throttle Drag Racing Series season
NHRA Full Throttle Drag Racing Series	Pro Stock Motorcycle: (United States) Hector Arana	2009 NHRA Full Throttle Drag Racing Series season
European Drag Racing Championship	Top Fuel: (United Kingdom) Andy Carter	
European Drag Racing Championship	Top Methanol Dragster: (Germany) Timo Habermann	
European Drag Racing Championship	Top Methanol Funny Car: (Sweden) Ulf Leanders	
European Drag Racing Championship	Pro Stock Car: (Sweden) Jimmy Ålund	
European Drag Racing Championship	Pro Stock Modified: (Sweden) Mats Eriksson	

== Drifting ==
Series	Champion	Refer
British Drift Championship	(United Kingdom) Steve Biagioni	2009 British Drift Championship
British Drift Championship	Semi-Pro: (United Kingdom) Martin Richards	2009 British Drift Championship
D1 Grand Prix	(Japan) Youichi Imamura	2009 D1 Grand Prix series
D1 Grand Prix	D1SL: (Japan) Naoki Nakamura	2009 D1 Grand Prix series
Drift Allstars	(Netherlands) Remmo Niezen	2009 Drift Allstars
European Drift Championship	(United Kingdom) Mark Luney	2009 European Drift Championship season
Formula D	(United States) Chris Forsberg	2009 Formula D season
Formula D Asia	(Malaysia) Tengku Djan Ley	2009 Formula D Asia season

== Karting ==
Series	Driver	refer
KF1
CIK-FIA European Championship	(Finland) Aaro Vainio	
KF Winter Series	(United Kingdom) Mark Litchfield	
KF2
CIK-FIA European Championship	(Italy) Angelo Lombardo	
Finnish Championship	(Finland) Aleksi Tuukkanen	
Florida Winter Tour	(United States) Alex Speed	
KF Winter Series	(United Kingdom) Shaun Carter	
KF3
WSK KF3 International Series	(Netherlands) Nyck de Vries	
German Junior Kart Championship	(Netherlands) Nyck de Vries	
CIK-FIA European Championship	(Netherlands) Nyck de Vries	
Finnish Championship	(Finland) Matias Köykkä	
Florida Winter Tour	(United States) Tristan DeGrand	
KF Winter Series	(United Kingdom) Alexander Albon	
Swedish Championship	(Sweden) Gustav Malja	
KZ2
Finnish Championship	(Finland) Jesse Kuusi	
Kerpen Winterpokal	(Germany) Marcel Jeleniowski	
Swedish Championship	(Sweden) Filip Gudmundsson	
Rotax Max/Rotax series
Dutch Chrono Micro Max Winter Championship	(Belgium) Milan Evers	
Florida Winter Tour Rotax DD2	(Canada) Darren White	
Florida Winter Tour Rotax Micro Max	(United States) Logan Sargeant	
Florida Winter Tour Rotax Senior	(Brazil) Fábio Orsolon	
South Florida Rotax Max Challenge	(Dominican Republic) Jonathan De Castro	
Swedish Rotax Max Championship	(Sweden) Nicodemus Ahlin	
Superkart
Australian Superkart Championship	250 International: (Australia) Sam Zavaglia	2009 Australian Superkart season
Australian Superkart Championship	125cc Gearbox: (Australia) Steven Tamasi	2009 Australian Superkart season
European Superkart Championship	(United Kingdom) Gavin Bennett	
Finnish Formula 250	(Finland) Kai Frisk	
Other Florida Winter Tour series
Florida Winter Tour Comer Cadet	(United States) Santino Ferrucci	
Florida Winter Tour Masters Shifter	(United States) Eduardo Martins	
Florida Winter Tour Pro Shifter	(United States) Alex Speed	
Florida Winter Tour Stock Moto	(Brazil) Victor Carbone	
Florida Winter Tour TaG Junior	(Philippines) Alessandra Madrigal	
Florida Winter Tour TaG Senior	(Puerto Rico) Richard Benitez	
Other series
Homestead Karting Spring Championship Series	(Dominican Republic) Jonathan De Castro	
Kerpen Winterpokal Bambini	(Germany) Alex Lambertz	
Middle East Junior Karting Cup	(United Kingdom) Heinrich Watson Miller	
Swedish Formula Yamaha Championship	(Sweden) Hampus Petersson	
Trofeo di Primavera 60cc	(Italy) Roberto Zoanni	

== Motorcycle racing ==
Series	Rider	refer
MotoGP World Championship	(Italy) Valentino Rossi	2009 Grand Prix motorcycle racing season
MotoGP World Championship	Manufacturers: (Japan) Yamaha	2009 Grand Prix motorcycle racing season
MotoGP World Championship	Teams: (Italy) Fiat Yamaha Team	2009 Grand Prix motorcycle racing season
250cc World Championship	(Japan) Hiroshi Aoyama	2009 Grand Prix motorcycle racing season
250cc World Championship	Manufacturers: (Italy) Aprilia	2009 Grand Prix motorcycle racing season
125cc World Championship	(Spain) Julián Simón	2009 Grand Prix motorcycle racing season
125cc World Championship	Manufacturers: (Italy) Aprilia	2009 Grand Prix motorcycle racing season
Superbike World Championship	(United States) Ben Spies	2009 Superbike World Championship
Superbike World Championship	Manufacturers: (Italy) Ducati	2009 Superbike World Championship
Supersport World Championship	(United Kingdom) Cal Crutchlow	2009 Supersport World Championship
Supersport World Championship	Manufacturers: (Japan) Honda	2009 Supersport World Championship
FIM Superstock 1000 Cup	(Belgium) Xavier Siméon	2009 FIM Superstock 1000 Cup
FIM Superstock 1000 Cup	Manufacturers: (Italy) Ducati	2009 FIM Superstock 1000 Cup
European Superstock 600 Championship	(United Kingdom) Gino Rea	
Sidecar World Championship	(United Kingdom) Ben Birchall (United Kingdom) Tom Birchall	
Endurance World Championship	Yamaha Austria Racing 7	
Endurance World Championship	Manufacturers: (Japan) Yamaha	
Endurance World Cup	Qatar Endurance Racing Team	
Endurance World Cup	Manufacturers: (Japan) Suzuki	
Red Bull MotoGP Rookies Cup	(Czech Republic) Jakub Kornfeil	2009 Red Bull MotoGP Rookies Cup
European Road Racing Championship	125cc: (Germany) Marcel Schrötter	
European Road Racing Championship	Supersport: (United Kingdom) Kev Coghlan	
European Road Racing Championship	Superstock: (Spain) Carmelo Morales	
ICGP UEM Cup	350cc: (United Kingdom) Lea Gourlay	
ICGP UEM Cup	250cc: (France) André Gouin	
Supermono UEM Cup	(Germany) Manfred Kehrmann	
Australian Superbike Championship	(Australia) Josh Waters	
British Superbike Championship	(United Kingdom) Leon Camier	2009 British Superbike Championship
British Superbike Championship	Cup: (United Kingdom) Gary Mason	2009 British Superbike Championship
British Supersport Championship	(United Kingdom) Steve Plater	2009 British Supersport Championship
British Supersport Championship	Cup: (United Kingdom) Sam Lowes	2009 British Supersport Championship
British Superstock 1000 Championship	(United Kingdom) Alastair Seeley	
British Superstock 600 Championship	(United Kingdom) Jamie Hamilton	
British 125 Championship	(United Kingdom) James Lodge	2009 British 125 Championship
British 125 Championship	Cup: (United Kingdom) Tim Hastings	2009 British 125 Championship
KTM RC8 Super Cup	(United Kingdom) Dave Wood	
AMA Superbike Championship	(Australia) Mat Mladin	2009 AMA Pro American Superbike Championship
AMA Daytona Sportbike Championship	(United States) Danny Eslick	2009 AMA Pro Daytona Sportbike Championship
AMA Supersport Championship	East: (United States) Josh Day	
AMA Supersport Championship	West: (United States) Ricky Parker	
AMA Supersport Championship	National: (Argentina) Leandro Mercado	
AMA Moto-GT Championship	(United States) Crozier Motorsports	

=== Motocross ===
Series	Rider	refer
FIM Motocross World Championship	MX1: (Italy) Antonio Cairoli	2009 FIM Motocross World Championship season
FIM Motocross World Championship	MX1 Manufacturers: (Japan) Yamaha	2009 FIM Motocross World Championship season
FIM Motocross World Championship	MX2: (France) Marvin Musquin	2009 FIM Motocross World Championship season
FIM Motocross World Championship	MX2 Manufacturers: (Austria) KTM	2009 FIM Motocross World Championship season
FIM Motocross World Championship	MX3: (France) Pierre Renet	2009 FIM Motocross World Championship season
FIM Motocross World Championship	MX3 Manufacturers: (Japan) Honda	2009 FIM Motocross World Championship season
FIM Motocross World Championship	Junior: (United States) Eli Tomac	2009 FIM Motocross World Championship season
FIM Motocross World Championship	Women: (Germany) Stephanie Laier	2009 FIM Motocross World Championship season
FIM Motocross World Championship	Women Manufacturers: (Austria) KTM	2009 FIM Motocross World Championship season
FIM Supercross World Championship	(United States) James Stewart Jr.	2009 AMA Supercross season
AMA Supercross	(United States) James Stewart Jr.	2009 AMA Supercross season
AMA Supercross Lites	West: (United States) Ryan Dungey	
AMA Supercross Lites	East: (France) Christophe Pourcel	
X Games
Sidecarcross World Championship	(Belgium) Joris Hendrickx (Latvia) Kaspars Liepiņš	2009 Sidecarcross world championship

=== Speedway ===
Series	Champion	refer
Speedway World Championship	(Australia) Jason Crump	2009 Speedway Grand Prix
Individual Speedway Australian Championship	(Australia) Leigh Adams	2009 Individual Speedway Australian Championship
Australian Under 16 Solo Speedway Championship	(Australia) Arthur Sissis	
Australian Under 21 Solo Speedway Championship	(Australia) Darcy Ward	
Australian Sidecar Speedway Championship	(Australia) Mark Mitchell (Australia) Tom Golding	
Australian Under 16 Teams Speedway Championship	(Australia) Manson Campton	
Australian Under 16 Sidecar Speedway Championship	(Australia) Shane Hudson (Australia) Sam Gilbert	
Australian 350cc Junior Speedway Championship	(Australia) Brenton Barnfield	
Speedway Swedish Individual Championship	(Sweden) Andreas Jonsson	
British Speedway Championship	(United Kingdom) Chris Harris	
Individual Speedway Danish Championship	(Denmark) Nicki Pedersen	
Individual Speedway Polish Championship	(Poland) Tomasz Gollob	
Speedway World Cup	Poland national speedway team	2009 Speedway World Cup
Team Speedway Junior World Championship	Poland national under-21 speedway team	2009 Team Speedway Junior World Championship
Individual Ice Racing World Championship	(Russia) Nikolay Krasnikov	
Team Ice Racing World Championship	Russia	
Individual Ice Racing European Championship	(Russia) Dmitri Bulankin	
Individual Junior Ice Racing European Championship	(Russia) Andrej Gavrilkin	

== Open wheel racing ==
Series	Champion	refer
FIA Formula One World Championship	(United Kingdom) Jenson Button	2009 Formula One World Championship
FIA Formula One World Championship	Constructors: (United Kingdom) Brawn-Mercedes	2009 Formula One World Championship
GP2 Series	(Germany) Nico Hülkenberg	2009 GP2 Series
GP2 Series	Teams: (France) ART Grand Prix	2009 GP2 Series
GP2 Asia Series	(Japan) Kamui Kobayashi	2008–09 GP2 Asia Series
GP2 Asia Series	Teams: (France) DAMS	2008–09 GP2 Asia Series
IndyCar Series	(United Kingdom) Dario Franchitti	2009 IndyCar Series season
IndyCar Series	Rookie: (Brazil) Raphael Matos	2009 IndyCar Series season
A1 Grand Prix	(Republic of Ireland) A1 Team Ireland (Adam Carroll)	2008–09 A1 Grand Prix season
Superleague Formula	(England) Liverpool F.C. (Adrián Vallés)	2009 Superleague Formula season
FIA Formula Two Championship	(Spain) Andy Soucek	2009 FIA Formula Two Championship season
Firestone Indy Lights	(United States) J. R. Hildebrand	2009 Indy Lights season
Firestone Indy Lights	Teams: (United States) AGR-AFS Racing	2009 Indy Lights season
Atlantic Championship	(United States) John Edwards	2009 Atlantic Championship season
Atlantic Championship	C2: (United States) Michael Mällinen	2009 Atlantic Championship season
Atlantic Championship	Teams: (United States) Newman Wachs Racing	2009 Atlantic Championship season
Star Mazda Championship	(United Kingdom) Adam Christodoulou	2009 Star Mazda Championship season
Formula Nippon	(France) Loïc Duval	2009 Formula Nippon season
Formula Nippon	Teams: (Japan) Nakajima Racing	2009 Formula Nippon season
EuroBOSS Series	(Netherlands) Henk de Boer	2009 EuroBOSS Series
EuroBOSS Series	Teams: (Netherlands) De Boer Manx	2009 EuroBOSS Series
International Formula Master	(Switzerland) Fabio Leimer	2009 International Formula Master
International Formula Master	Teams: (Italy) JD Motorsport	2009 International Formula Master
International Formula Master	Rookies: (United States) Alexander Rossi	2009 International Formula Master
Historic Formula One Championship	(United Kingdom) Bobby Verdon-Roe	2009 Historic Formula One Championship
JAF Japan Formula 4	East: (Japan) Tsubasa Kondō	2009 JAF Japan Formula 4
JAF Japan Formula 4	West: (Japan) Shōta Hanaoka	2009 JAF Japan Formula 4
Euroseries 3000	(United Kingdom) Will Bratt	2009 Euroseries 3000 season
Euroseries 3000	Teams: (Italy) FMS International	2009 Euroseries 3000 season
Italian Formula 3000	(United Kingdom) Will Bratt	2009 Euroseries 3000 season
Formula Palmer Audi	(United Kingdom) Richard Plant	2009 Formula Palmer Audi season
Formula Volkswagen South Africa Championship	(South Africa) Jayde Kruger	2009 Formula Volkswagen South Africa Championship
Formula Volkswagen South Africa Championship	Teams: (South Africa) Racing Factors	2009 Formula Volkswagen South Africa Championship
ADAC Formel Masters	(Germany) Daniel Abt	2009 ADAC Formel Masters
ADAC Formel Masters	Teams: (Germany) Abt Sportsline	2009 ADAC Formel Masters
Formula Challenge Japan	(Japan) Kazuki Miura	
Formula Three
Formula 3 Euro Series	(France) Jules Bianchi	2009 Formula 3 Euro Series season
Formula 3 Euro Series	Teams: (France) ART Grand Prix	2009 Formula 3 Euro Series season
Formula 3 Euro Series	Rookie: (Finland) Valtteri Bottas	2009 Formula 3 Euro Series season
Formula 3 Euro Series	Nation: France	2009 Formula 3 Euro Series season
British Formula 3 Championship	(Australia) Daniel Ricciardo	2009 British Formula 3 season
British Formula 3 Championship	National: (United Kingdom) Daniel McKenzie	2009 British Formula 3 season
German Formula Three Championship	Overall: (Belgium) Laurens Vanthoor	2009 German Formula Three season
German Formula Three Championship	Trophy: (Ukraine) Sergey Chukanov	2009 German Formula Three season
German Formula Three Championship	Rookie: (Netherlands) Stef Dusseldorp	2009 German Formula Three season
German Formula Three Championship	AvD Speed: (Belgium) Laurens Vanthoor	2009 German Formula Three season
Italian Formula Three Championship	(Italy) Daniel Zampieri	2009 Italian Formula Three season
Italian Formula Three Championship	Teams: (Italy) BVM - Target Racing	2009 Italian Formula Three season
All-Japan Formula Three Championship	(Sweden) Marcus Ericsson	2009 Japanese Formula 3 Championship
All-Japan Formula Three Championship	Teams: (Japan) TOM'S	2009 Japanese Formula 3 Championship
All-Japan Formula Three Championship	National: (Japan) Naoki Yamamoto	2009 Japanese Formula 3 Championship
European F3 Open Championship	Open: (Spain) Bruno Méndez	2009 European F3 Open season
European F3 Open Championship	Teams: (Spain) Campos Racing	2009 European F3 Open season
European F3 Open Championship	Copa: (United Kingdom) Callum MacLeod	2009 European F3 Open season
Formula 3 Sudamericana	(Brazil) Leonardo Cordeiro	2009 Formula 3 Sudamericana season
Formula 3 Sudamericana	Teams: (Brazil) Cesario Formula	2009 Formula 3 Sudamericana season
Finnish Formula Three Championship	(Finland) Kimmo Joutvuo	2009 Finnish Formula Three Championship
Finnish Formula Three Championship	Teams: (Finland) Rolling Rocks	2009 Finnish Formula Three Championship
Australian Drivers' Championship	Gold Star: (United Kingdom) Joey Foster	2009 Australian Drivers' Championship
Australian Drivers' Championship	National A: (Australia) Tom Tweedie	2009 Australian Drivers' Championship
Australian Drivers' Championship	National B: (United Kingdom) Peter Kalpakiotis	2009 Australian Drivers' Championship
Toyota Racing Series	(New Zealand) Mitch Cunningham	2008–09 Toyota Racing Series
Austria Formula 3 Cup	(Germany) Francesco Lopez	
North European Zone Formula 3 Cup	(Finland) Jani Tammi	
Chilean Formula Three Championship	(Chile) Javier Barrales	
Formula Renault
Formula Renault 3.5 Series	(Belgium) Bertrand Baguette	2009 Formula Renault 3.5 Series season
Formula Renault 3.5 Series	Teams: (Portugal) International DracoRacing	2009 Formula Renault 3.5 Series season
Formula V6 Asia	(Bahrain) Hamad Al Fardan	2009 Formula V6 Asia season
Formula V6 Asia	Teams: (Hong Kong) Dyna Ten Motorsport	2009 Formula V6 Asia season
Eurocup Formula Renault 2.0	(Spain) Albert Costa	2009 Eurocup Formula Renault 2.0 season
Eurocup Formula Renault 2.0	Teams: (Spain) Epsilon Euskadi	2009 Eurocup Formula Renault 2.0 season
Formula Renault West European Cup	(Spain) Albert Costa	2009 Formula Renault WEC season
Formula Renault West European Cup	Teams: (Spain) Epsilon Euskadi	2009 Formula Renault WEC season
Formula Renault Northern European Cup	(Portugal) António Félix da Costa	2009 Formula Renault 2.0 NEC season
Formula Renault UK	C: (United Kingdom) Dean Smith	2009 Formula Renault UK season
Formula Renault UK	G: (United Kingdom) Harry Tincknell	2009 Formula Renault UK season
Formula Renault BARC	(United Kingdom) Kieren Clark	2009 Formula Renault BARC season
Formula Renault 2.0 Finland	(Finland) Jukka Honkavuori	2009 Finnish Formula Renault season
Italian Formula Renault Championship	(Italy) Daniel Mancinelli	2009 Italian Formula Renault season
Italian Formula Renault Championship	Teams: (Italy) CO2 Motorsport	2009 Italian Formula Renault season
Formule Renault 2.0 Suisse	(Switzerland) Nico Müller	2009 Swiss Formula Renault season
Formule Renault 2.0 Suisse	Teams: (Italy) CO2 Motorsport	2009 Swiss Formula Renault season
Formula Renault 2.0 Sweden	(Sweden) Felix Rosenqvist	2009 Swedish Formula Renault season
Formula Renault North European Zone	(Sweden) Felix Rosenqvist	2009 Formula Renault NEZ season
Formula 2000 Light	(Germany) Thiemo Storz	2009 Formula 2000 Light season
Formula 2000 Light	Opening Series: (Italy) Giovanni Venturini	2009 Formula 2000 Light season
Formula Renault 2.0 Argentina	(Argentina) Facundo Ardusso	2008 Formula Renault 2.0 Argentina
Formul'Academy Euro Series	(Belgium) Benjamin Bailly	2009 Formul'Academy Euro Series season
Formula Azzurra	(Italy) Alberto Cerqui	
Formula BMW
Formula BMW Europe	(Brazil) Felipe Nasr	2009 Formula BMW Europe season
Formula BMW Europe	Teams: (United States) EuroInternational	2009 Formula BMW Europe season
Formula BMW Pacific	(Indonesia) Rio Haryanto	2009 Formula BMW Pacific season
Formula BMW Pacific	Teams: (Malaysia) Questnet Team Qi-Meritus	2009 Formula BMW Pacific season
Formula BMW Americas	(Colombia) Gabriel Chaves	2009 Formula BMW Americas season
Formula BMW Americas	Teams: (United States) EuroInternational	2009 Formula BMW Americas season
Formula Lista Junior	(Italy) Kevin Giovesi	2009 Formula Lista Junior season
Formula Lista Junior	Teams: (Switzerland) Daltec Racing	2009 Formula Lista Junior season
Formula Ford
British Formula Ford Championship	C: (United Kingdom) James Cole	2009 British Formula Ford season
British Formula Ford Championship	S: (United Kingdom) Daniel Cammish	2009 British Formula Ford season
Australian Formula Ford Championship	(Australia) Nick Percat	2009 Australian Formula Ford Championship
Danish Formula Ford Championship	(Denmark) Dennis Lind	
Finnish Formula Ford Championship	(Finland) Janne Knuutinen	
New Zealand Formula Ford Championship	(New Zealand) Richie Stanaway	
F2000 Championship Series	(United States) Chris Miller	
Pacific F2000	(United States) Robert Podlesni	
Scottish Formula Ford Championship	(United Kingdom) Rory Butcher	

== Powerboat racing ==
Series	Driver	refer
C1 World Powerboat Championship	(United Arab Emirates) Fazza 3 ( (United Arab Emirates) Arif Saif Al Zafeen, (United Arab Emirates) Nadir Bin Hendi)	
C1 Middle East Championship	(United Arab Emirates) Fazza 3 ( (United Arab Emirates) Arif Saif Al Zafeen, (United Arab Emirates) Nadir Bin Hendi)	
C1 European Championship	(United Arab Emirates) Victory 1 ( (United Arab Emirates) Mohammad Al Mehairi, (France) Jean-Marc Sanchez)	
H1 Unlimited	Team: (United States) Miss Madison	2009 H1 Unlimited season
H1 Unlimited	Driver: (United States) Steve David	2009 H1 Unlimited season
F1 Powerboat World Championship	(Italy) Guido Cappellini	2009 F1 Powerboat World Championship
F1 Powerboat World Championship	Teams: (United Arab Emirates) Team Abu Dhabi	2009 F1 Powerboat World Championship

== Rallying ==
Series	Driver/Co-Driver	refer
World Rally Championship	(France) Sébastien Loeb (Monaco) Daniel Elena	2009 World Rally Championship season
World Rally Championship	Teams: (France) Citroën Total WRT	2009 World Rally Championship season
Junior World Rally Championship	(Czech Republic) Martin Prokop (Czech Republic) Jan Tománek	2009 World Rally Championship season
Production World Rally Championship	(Portugal) Armindo Araújo (Portugal) Miguel Ramalho	2009 World Rally Championship season
Intercontinental Rally Challenge	(United Kingdom) Kris Meeke (Republic of Ireland) Paul Nagle	2009 Intercontinental Rally Challenge season
Intercontinental Rally Challenge	Manufacturers: (France) Peugeot	2009 Intercontinental Rally Challenge season
African Rally Championship	(Zimbabwe) James Whyte (Zimbabwe) Phil Archenoul	2009 African Rally Championship season
African Rally Championship	Manufacturers: (Japan) Subaru	2009 African Rally Championship season
Asia-Pacific Rally Championship	(Australia) Cody Crocker (Australia) Ben Atkinson	2009 Asia-Pacific Rally Championship season
Asia-Pacific Rally Championship	Asia Cup: (Australia) Cody Crocker; Asia Cup: (Australia) Ben Atkinson	2009 Asia-Pacific Rally Championship season
Asia-Pacific Rally Championship	Pacific Cup: (New Zealand) Hayden Paddon; Pacific Cup: (New Zealand) John Kennard	2009 Asia-Pacific Rally Championship season
Australian Rally Championship	(Australia) Simon Evans (Australia) Sue Evans	2009 Australian Rally Championship
British Rally Championship	(Republic of Ireland) Keith Cronin (Republic of Ireland) Greg Shinnors	2009 British Rally Championship season
Canadian Rally Championship	(Canada) Patrick Richard	2009 Canadian Rally Championship
Canadian Rally Championship	Co-Drivers: (Canada) Alan Ockwell	2009 Canadian Rally Championship
Central European Zone Rally Championship	S2000: (Poland) Michał Sołowow	2009 Central European Zone Rally Championship
Central European Zone Rally Championship	S1600: (Czech Republic) Jiří Vlček	2009 Central European Zone Rally Championship
Central European Zone Rally Championship	Production: (Czech Republic) Václav Pech	2009 Central European Zone Rally Championship
Central European Zone Rally Championship	2WD: (Italy) Andrea Torlasco	2009 Central European Zone Rally Championship
Central European Zone Rally Championship	Historic: (Hungary) Andras Kovesdan	2009 Central European Zone Rally Championship
Codasur South American Rally Championship	(Argentina) Raúl Martínez	
Czech Rally Championship	(Czech Republic) Roman Kresta	2009 Czech Rally Championship
Czech Rally Championship	Co-Drivers: (Czech Republic) Petr Gross	2009 Czech Rally Championship
Deutsche Rallye Meisterschaft	(Germany) Hermann Gassner	
Estonian Rally Championship	(Estonia) Marko Kasepõld	2009 Estonian Rally Championship
Estonian Rally Championship	Co-Drivers: (Estonia) Rein Jõessar	2009 Estonian Rally Championship
Estonian Rally Championship	Super 2000: (Estonia) Ott Tänak	2009 Estonian Rally Championship
Estonian Rally Championship	Super 2000 Co-Drivers: (Estonia) Raigo Mõlder	2009 Estonian Rally Championship
European Rally Championship	(Italy) Giandomenico Basso	2009 European Rally Championship
European Rally Championship	Co-Drivers: (Italy) Mitia Dotta	2009 European Rally Championship
French Rally Championship	(France) Guillaume Canivenq	
Hungarian Rally Championship	(Hungary) Norbert Herczig	
Hungarian Rally Championship	Co-Drivers: (Hungary) László Baranyai	
Indian National Rally Championship	(India) Gaurav Gill	
Indian National Rally Championship	Co-Drivers: (India) Musa Sherif	
Italian Rally Championship	(Italy) Paolo Andreucci	
Italian Rally Championship	Co-Drivers: (Italy) Anna Andreussi	
Italian Rally Championship	Manufacturers: (France) Peugeot	
Middle East Rally Championship	(Qatar) Nasser Al-Attiyah	
NACAM Rally Championship	(Mexico) Ricardo Triviño	
New Zealand Rally Championship	(New Zealand) Hayden Paddon	2009 New Zealand Rally Championship
New Zealand Rally Championship	Co-Drivers: (New Zealand) John Kennard	2009 New Zealand Rally Championship
Polish Rally Championship	(France) Bryan Bouffier	
Rally America	(United States) Travis Pastrana	2009 Rally America season
Rally America	Co-Drivers: (Sweden) Christian Edstrom	2009 Rally America season
Romanian Rally Championship	(Hungary) Gergő Szabó	
Scottish Rally Championship	(United Kingdom) David Bogie	
Scottish Rally Championship	Co-Drivers: (United Kingdom) Kevin Rae	
Slovak Rally Championship	(Slovakia) Jozef Béreš Jr.	
Slovak Rally Championship	Co-Drivers: (Slovakia) Róbert Müller	
South African National Rally Championship	(South Africa) Hergen Fekken	
South African National Rally Championship	Co-Drivers: (South Africa) Pierre Arries	
South African National Rally Championship	Manufacturers: (Japan) Toyota	
Spanish Rally Championship	(Spain) Sergio Vallejo	
Spanish Rally Championship	Co-Drivers: (Spain) Diego Vallejo	

=== Rally raid ===
Series	Driver/Co-Driver	refer
Cross Country Rally World Cup	(France) Guerlain Chicherit (Sweden) Tina Thorner	
Cross Country Rally World Cup	Manufacturers: (Germany) X-Raid GmbH	
Cross Country Rally World Cup	2WD Trophy Drivers: (France) Pascal Thomasse; 2WD Trophy Drivers: (France) Pascal Larroque	
Cross Country Rally World Cup	2WD Trophy Manufacturers: (France) MD	
Cross Country Rally World Cup	Production T2 Drivers: (Russia) Artem Varentsov; Production T2 Drivers: (Russia) Roman Elagin	
Cross Country Rally World Cup	Production T2 Manufacturers: (Japan) Nissan	
International Cup for Cross-Country Bajas	(Russia) Boris Gadasin (Russia) Vladimir Demyanenko	
International Cup for Cross-Country Bajas	Production T2: (Russia) Artem Varentsov; Production T2: (Russia) Roman Elagin	

=== Rallycross ===
Series	Driver	refer
European Rallycross Championship	Division 1: (Norway) Sverre Isachsen	
European Rallycross Championship	Division 1A: (Norway) Mats Lysen	
European Rallycross Championship	Division 2: (Norway) Knut Ove Børseth	
ERA Cup	Division 1: (Norway) Sverre Isachsen	
ERA Cup	Division 1A: (Norway) Mats Lysen	
ERA Cup	Division 2: (Norway) Knut Ove Børseth	
Central European Zone Trophy	Division 1: (Hungary) Zoltán Harsányi	
Central European Zone Trophy	Division 1A: (Czech Republic) Petr Bílek	
Central European Zone Trophy	Division 2: (Czech Republic) Roman Častoral	
Central European Zone Trophy	Division 4: (Czech Republic) Tomáš Hurt	
North European Zone Championship	1600: (Lithuania) Ugnius Jurdonas	
North European Zone Championship	2000: (Lithuania) Vaidas Navickas	
North European Zone Championship	Open: (Norway) Ola Frøshaug	
North European Zone Championship	4WD: (Lithuania) Vitalijus Plastininas	
MSA British Rallycross Championship	(United Kingdom) Pat Doran	
BRDA British Rallycross Championship	Supercar: (United Kingdom) Pat Doran	
BRDA British Rallycross Championship	Supermodified: (United Kingdom) James Bird	
BRDA British Rallycross Championship	Stock Hatch A: (United Kingdom) Tony Lynch	
BRDA British Rallycross Championship	Stock Hatch B: (United Kingdom) Toby Crocker	
BRDA British Rallycross Championship	Junior: (United Kingdom) Bradley Bailey	
Austrian Rallycross Championship	Division 1: (Austria) Peter Ramler	
Austrian Rallycross Championship	Division 1A: (Czech Republic) Petr Bílek	
Austrian Rallycross Championship	Division 2: (Czech Republic) Roman Častoral	
Austrian Rallycross Championship	Division 4: (Czech Republic) Jan Skála	
German Rallycross Championship	Division 1: (Germany) René Münnich	
German Rallycross Championship	Division 1A: (Germany) Rolf Volland	
German Rallycross Championship	Division 5: (Germany) Ralf Goltz	
French Rallycross Championship	Division 1: (France) Marc Laboulle	
French Rallycross Championship	Division 1A: (France) Samuel Peu	
French Rallycross Championship	Division 3: (France) Marc Morize	
French Rallycross Championship	Division 4: (France) Yvonnick Jagu	
Coupe Logan Rallycross	(France) David Olivier	
Finnish Rallycross Championship	Division 1: (Finland) Atro Määttä	
Finnish Rallycross Championship	SRC: (Finland) Mika Vaaranmaa	
Swedish Rallycross Championship	Division 1: (Sweden) Stig-Olov Walfridsson	
Swedish Rallycross Championship	Super Nationell: (Sweden) Fredrik Tiger	
Swedish Rallycross Championship	Nationell 2400: (Sweden) Daniel Wall	

== Sports car ==
Series	Driver	refer
American Le Mans Series	LMP1: (Australia) David Brabham; LMP1: (United States) Scott Sharp	2009 American Le Mans Series season
American Le Mans Series	LMP1 Teams: (United States) Highcroft Racing	2009 American Le Mans Series season
American Le Mans Series	LMP2: (Mexico) Luis Díaz; LMP2: (Mexico) Adrian Fernández	2009 American Le Mans Series season
American Le Mans Series	LMP2 Teams: (Mexico) Fernández Racing	2009 American Le Mans Series season
American Le Mans Series	GT2: (Germany) Jörg Bergmeister; GT2: (United States) Patrick Long	2009 American Le Mans Series season
American Le Mans Series	GT2 Teams: (United States) Flying Lizard Motorsports	2009 American Le Mans Series season
American Le Mans Series	Challenge: (United States) Martin Snow; Challenge: (United States) Melanie Snow	2009 American Le Mans Series season
American Le Mans Series	Challenge Teams: (United States) Snow Racing	2009 American Le Mans Series season
Le Mans Series	LMP1: (Czech Republic) Jan Charouz; LMP1: (Czech Republic) Tomáš Enge; LMP1: (Germany) Stefan Mücke	2009 Le Mans Series season
Le Mans Series	LMP1 Teams: (United Kingdom) Aston Martin Racing	2009 Le Mans Series season
Le Mans Series	LMP2: (Portugal) Miguel Amaral; LMP2: (France) Olivier Pla	2009 Le Mans Series season
Le Mans Series	LMP2 Teams: (Portugal) Quifel ASM Team	2009 Le Mans Series season
Le Mans Series	GT1: (France) Yann Clairay; GT1: (France) Patrice Goueslard	2009 Le Mans Series season
Le Mans Series	GT1 Teams: (France) Luc Alphand Adventures	2009 Le Mans Series season
Le Mans Series	GT2: (Germany) Marc Lieb; GT2: (Austria) Richard Lietz	2009 Le Mans Series season
Le Mans Series	GT2 Teams: (Germany) Team Felbermayr-Proton	2009 Le Mans Series season
Asian Le Mans Series	LMP1: (France) Christophe Tinseau; LMP1: (Japan) Shinji Nakano	2009 Asian Le Mans Series season
Asian Le Mans Series	LMP1 Teams: (France) Sora Racing	2009 Asian Le Mans Series season
Asian Le Mans Series	LMP2: (France) Jacques Nicolet; LMP2: (Monaco) Richard Hein; LMP2: (France) Matthieu Lahaye	2009 Asian Le Mans Series season
Asian Le Mans Series	LMP2 Teams: (France) OAK Racing	2009 Asian Le Mans Series season
Asian Le Mans Series	GT1: (Japan) Atsushi Yogo; GT1: (Japan) Hiroyuki Iiri	2009 Asian Le Mans Series season
Asian Le Mans Series	GT1 Teams: (Japan) JLOC	2009 Asian Le Mans Series season
Asian Le Mans Series	GT2: (Germany) Dominik Farnbacher; GT2: (Denmark) Allan Simonsen	2009 Asian Le Mans Series season
Asian Le Mans Series	GT2 Teams: (Germany) Hankook Team Farnbacher	2009 Asian Le Mans Series season
FIA GT Championship	GT1: (Germany) Michael Bartels; GT1: (Italy) Andrea Bertolini	2009 FIA GT Championship season
FIA GT Championship	GT1 Teams: (Germany) Vitaphone Racing	2009 FIA GT Championship season
FIA GT Championship	GT2: (United Kingdom) Richard Westbrook	2009 FIA GT Championship season
FIA GT Championship	GT2 Teams: (Italy) AF Corse	2009 FIA GT Championship season
FIA GT Championship	Citation Cup: (Canada) Chris Niarchos	2009 FIA GT Championship season
FIA GT3 European Championship	(Germany) Christopher Haase (Germany) Christopher Mies	2009 FIA GT3 European Championship season
FIA GT3 European Championship	Teams: (France) Hexis Racing AMR	2009 FIA GT3 European Championship season
FIA GT3 European Championship	Aston Martin Cup: (France) Thomas Accary; Aston Martin Cup: (France) Julien Rodrigues	2009 FIA GT3 European Championship season
FIA GT3 European Championship	Corvette Cup: (Italy) Diego Alessi; Corvette Cup: (Italy) Luca Pirri	2009 FIA GT3 European Championship season
FIA GT3 European Championship	Ferrari Cup: (Italy) Stefano Gattuso	2009 FIA GT3 European Championship season
FIA GT3 European Championship	Ford Cup: (Belgium) Eric De Doncker	2009 FIA GT3 European Championship season
FIA GT3 European Championship	Porsche Cup: (Austria) Niki Lanik	2009 FIA GT3 European Championship season
FIA GT3 European Championship	Audi Cup: (Germany) Christopher Haase; Audi Cup: (Germany) Christopher Mies	2009 FIA GT3 European Championship season
FIA GT3 European Championship	BMW Cup: (Hungary) Csaba Walter; BMW Cup: (Germany) Claudia Hürtgen	2009 FIA GT3 European Championship season
GT4 European Cup	(United Kingdom) Joe Osborne	
GT4 European Cup	Supersport: (Austria) Augustin Eder	
GT4 European Cup	Teams: (United Kingdom) RJN Motorsport	
Formula Le Mans Cup	(Belgium) Nico Verdonck	2009 Formula Le Mans Cup season
Formula Le Mans Cup	Teams: (France) DAMS	2009 Formula Le Mans Cup season
International GT Open	Overall: (Switzerland) Joël Camathias; Overall: (Switzerland) Marcel Fässler	2009 International GT Open season
International GT Open	Overall Teams: (Switzerland) Trottet Racing	2009 International GT Open season
International GT Open	Super GT: (Switzerland) Joël Camathias; Super GT: (Switzerland) Marcel Fässler	2009 International GT Open season
International GT Open	Super GT Teams: (Italy) Autorlando Sport	2009 International GT Open season
International GT Open	GTS: (Poland) Michał Broniszewski; GTS: (Austria) Philipp Peter	2009 International GT Open season
International GT Open	GTS Teams: (Italy) Villois Racing	2009 International GT Open season
Rolex Sports Car Series	DP: (United States) Jon Fogarty; DP: (United States) Alex Gurney	2009 Rolex Sports Car Series season
Rolex Sports Car Series	DP Teams: (United States) #99 GAINSCO/Bob Stallings Racing	2009 Rolex Sports Car Series season
Rolex Sports Car Series	DP Chassis: (United States) Riley Technologies	2009 Rolex Sports Car Series season
Rolex Sports Car Series	DP Engine: (United States) Ford	2009 Rolex Sports Car Series season
Rolex Sports Car Series	GT: (United States) Leh Keen; GT: (Germany) Dirk Werner	2009 Rolex Sports Car Series season
Rolex Sports Car Series	GT Teams: (United States) #87 Farnbacher Loles Racing	2009 Rolex Sports Car Series season
Rolex Sports Car Series	GT Engine: (Germany) Porsche	2009 Rolex Sports Car Series season
British GT Championship	GT3: (United Kingdom) David Jones; GT3: (United Kingdom) Godfrey Jones	2009 British GT season
British GT Championship	GT4: (United Kingdom) Jody Firth	2009 British GT season
British GT Championship	Supersport: (United Kingdom) Marcus Clutton; Supersport: (United Kingdom) Phil Keen	2009 British GT season
French GT Championship	GT: (France) Eric Debard	
French GT Championship	GT Teams: (Luxembourg) DKR Engineering	
French GT Championship	GT3: (France) Philippe Gaillard; GT3: (France) Mike Parisy	
French GT Championship	GT3 Teams: (France) Ruffier Racing	
Italian GT Championship	GT2: (Portugal) Francisco Cruz Martins	
Italian GT Championship	GT2 Teams: (Italy) Autorlando Sport	
Italian GT Championship	GT3: (Italy) Stefano Livio; GT3: (Italy) Lorenzo Bontempelli	
Italian GT Championship	GT3 Teams: (Switzerland) Kessel Racing	
Italian GT Championship	GT Cup: (Italy) Mario Ferraris; GT Cup: (Italy) Aldo Cerruti	
ADAC GT Masters	(Germany) Christian Abt	2009 ADAC GT Masters season
ADAC GT Masters	Teams: (Germany) Callaway Competition	2009 ADAC GT Masters season
ADAC GT Masters	Amateurs: (Switzerland) Toni Seiler	2009 ADAC GT Masters season
Australian GT Championship	Outright: (Australia) David Wall	
Australian GT Championship	GT Challenge: (Australia) Jordan Ormsby	
Australian GT Championship	GT Production: (Australia) Paul Freestone	
Belgian GT Championship	(Belgium) Jean-François Hemroulle (Belgium) Tim Verbergt	
Belgian GT Championship	Teams: (Belgium) Porsche First Motorsport	
Dutch Supercar Challenge	GT: (Netherlands) Cornelius Euser	
Dutch Supercar Challenge	SS1: (Netherlands) Nol Köhler; SS1: (Netherlands) Henk Haane	
Dutch Supercar Challenge	SS2: (Netherlands) Bert van der Zweerde	
Dutch Supercar Challenge	Sport: (Netherlands) Nik de Jong; Sport: (Netherlands) Koen Bogaerts	
Dutch GT4 Championship	(Netherlands) Christiaan Frankenhout	
Speed World Challenge GT	(United States) Brandon Davis	2009 Speed World Challenge season
GT3 Asia Challenge	(Malaysia) Tunku Hammam Sulong	
BioRacing Series	(France) Morgan Moulin-Traffort	
Italian Prototype Championship	(Italy) Davide Uboldi	
Italian Prototype Championship	CN2: (Italy) Jacopo Faccioni	
Ginettas
Ginetta G50 Cup	(United Kingdom) Nathan Freke	
Ginetta Junior Championship	(United Kingdom) Sarah Moore	
Ginetta Championship Great Britain	(United Kingdom) Mark Davies	
Ginetta G20 Eurocup	(United Kingdom) Mark Davies	
Ginetta Cup Sweden	(Sweden) Ola Nilsson	
Locosts
Locost 750MC Championship	(United Kingdom) David Bartholomew	
Mazdas
SCCA Playboy MX-5 Cup	(United States) Todd Lamb	
Ma5da MX5 Championship	(United Kingdom) Tom Roche	
Porsches
Porsche Supercup	(Netherlands) Jeroen Bleekemolen	2009 Porsche Supercup season
Porsche Supercup	Teams: (Austria) Konrad Motorsport	2009 Porsche Supercup season
Porsche Carrera Cup Great Britain	Pro: (United Kingdom) Tim Bridgman	
Porsche Carrera Cup Great Britain	Pro-Am 1: (United Kingdom) Glynn Geddie	
Porsche Carrera Cup Great Britain	Pro-Am 2: (United Kingdom) Glenn McMenamin	
Porsche Carrera Cup Great Britain	Teams: (United Kingdom) Redline Racing	
Porsche Carrera Cup Germany	(Germany) Thomas Jäger	
Porsche Carrera Cup Germany	Teams: (Germany) MS Racing	
Porsche Carrera Cup France	(France) Renaud Derlot	
Porsche Carrera Cup France	Class B: (France) Henry Hassid	
Porsche Carrera Cup France	Junior: (France) Kevin Estre	
Porsche Carrera Cup France	Teams: (France) Team Sofrev ASP	
Porsche Carrera Cup Italy	(Italy) Alessandro Balzan	
Porsche Carrera Cup Scandinavia	(Sweden) Jocke Mangs	
Porsche Carrera Cup Japan	(Japan) Yasuhiro Shimizu	
Porsche Carrera Cup Japan	Class B: (Japan) Michael Kim	
Porsche Carrera Cup Japan	Teams: (Japan) Direction Racing Evo	
Porsche GT3 Cup Australia	(Australia) Matt Kingsley	
Porsche GT3 Cup New Zealand	(New Zealand) Craig Baird	
New Zealand Porsche Championship	(New Zealand) Mike Baker	
Radicals
Radical European Masters	(United Kingdom) Derek Johnston	

== Stock car racing ==
Series	Driver	refer
NASCAR Sprint Cup Series	(United States) Jimmie Johnson	2009 NASCAR Sprint Cup Series
NASCAR Sprint Cup Series	Manufacturers: (United States) Chevrolet	2009 NASCAR Sprint Cup Series
NASCAR Nationwide Series	(United States) Kyle Busch	2009 NASCAR Nationwide Series
NASCAR Nationwide Series	Manufacturers: (Japan) Toyota	2009 NASCAR Nationwide Series
NASCAR Camping World Truck Series	(United States) Ron Hornaday Jr.	2009 NASCAR Camping World Truck Series
NASCAR Camping World Truck Series	Manufacturers: (Japan) Toyota	2009 NASCAR Camping World Truck Series
ARCA Re/Max Series	(United States) Justin Lofton	2009 ARCA Re/Max Series
NASCAR Camping World East Series	(United States) Ryan Truex	2009 NASCAR Camping World East Series
NASCAR Camping World West Series	(United States) Jason Bowles	2009 NASCAR Camping World West Series
NASCAR Canadian Tire Series	(Canada) Andrew Ranger	2009 NASCAR Canadian Tire Series
NASCAR Canadian Tire Series	Manufacturers: (United States) Ford	2009 NASCAR Canadian Tire Series
NASCAR Corona Series	(Mexico) Germán Quiroga	2009 NASCAR Corona Series
Speedcar Series	(Italy) Gianni Morbidelli	2008–09 Speedcar Series season
Speedcar Series	Teams: (United States) Palm Beach	2008–09 Speedcar Series season
Camaro Cup	(Norway) Ole Martin Lindum	
National Hot Rod World Final	(United Kingdom) Carl Boardley	
RACECAR Series	Elite: (France) Lucas Lasserre	
RACECAR Series	Open: (France) Wilfried Boucenna	
European Late Model Series	(United Kingdom) Gary Ellis	
Turismo Carretera	(Argentina) Emanuel Moriatis	2009 Turismo Carretera

== Touring car racing ==
Series	Driver	refer
World Touring Car Championship	Overall: (Italy) Gabriele Tarquini	2009 World Touring Car Championship season
World Touring Car Championship	M/C: (Spain) SEAT Sport	2009 World Touring Car Championship season
World Touring Car Championship	Independents: (Netherlands) Tom Coronel	2009 World Touring Car Championship season
World Touring Car Championship	Independent Teams: (Spain) SUNRED Engineering	2009 World Touring Car Championship season
Deutsche Tourenwagen Masters	(Germany) Timo Scheider	2009 Deutsche Tourenwagen Masters
Deutsche Tourenwagen Masters	Teams: (Germany) HWA Team II	2009 Deutsche Tourenwagen Masters
British Touring Car Championship	Overall: (United Kingdom) Colin Turkington	2009 British Touring Car Championship season
British Touring Car Championship	M/C: (United Kingdom) Vauxhall	2009 British Touring Car Championship season
British Touring Car Championship	Teams: (United Kingdom) VX Racing	2009 British Touring Car Championship season
British Touring Car Championship	Independents: (United Kingdom) Colin Turkington	2009 British Touring Car Championship season
British Touring Car Championship	Independent Teams: (United Kingdom) Team RAC	2009 British Touring Car Championship season
European Touring Car Cup	Super 2000: (United Kingdom) James Thompson	2009 European Touring Car Cup
European Touring Car Cup	Super Production: (Latvia) Marcis Birkens	2009 European Touring Car Cup
European Touring Car Cup	Super 1600: (Germany) Carsten Seifert	2009 European Touring Car Cup
V8 Supercar Championship Series	(Australia) Jamie Whincup	2009 V8 Supercar Championship Series
V8 Supercar Championship Series	Teams: (Australia) Holden Racing Team	2009 V8 Supercar Championship Series
V8 Supercar Championship Series	Manufacturers: (United States) Ford	2009 V8 Supercar Championship Series
Fujitsu V8 Supercar Series	(Australia) Jonathon Webb	2009 Fujitsu V8 Supercar Series
Swedish Touring Car Championship	(Norway) Tommy Rustad	2009 Swedish Touring Car Championship season
Swedish Touring Car Championship	Junior: (Sweden) Linus Ohlsson	2009 Swedish Touring Car Championship season
Swedish Touring Car Championship	Privateers: (Sweden) Victor Hallrup	2009 Swedish Touring Car Championship season
Danish Touring Car Championship	(Denmark) Michel Nykjær	
Stock Car Brasil	(Brazil) Cacá Bueno	2009 Stock Car Brasil season
TC2000 Championship	(Argentina) José María López	2009 TC 2000 Championship
ADAC Procar Series	D1: (Switzerland) Remo Friberg	
ADAC Procar Series	D2: (Switzerland) Guido Thierfelder	
ADAC Procar Series	D3: (Switzerland) Matthias Schläppi	
Asian Touring Car Series	(Hong Kong) Cheung Chi Sing	2009 Asian Touring Car Series
Asian Touring Car Series	Teams: (Hong Kong) Team IMSP	2009 Asian Touring Car Series
Australian Saloon Car Series	(Australia) Shawn Jamieson	2009 Australian Saloon Car Series
BRL V6	(Netherlands) Donald Molenaar	2009 BRL V6 season
Campeonato Brasileiro de Marcas e Pilotos	(Brazil) Marco Romanini	2009 Campeonato Brasileiro de Marcas e Pilotos
Portuguese Touring Car Championship	Overall: (Portugal) José Pedro Fontes	
Portuguese Touring Car Championship	D1: (Portugal) José Pedro Fontes	
Portuguese Touring Car Championship	D2: (Portugal) Duarte Félix da Costa	
Portuguese Touring Car Championship	D3: (Portugal) Nuno Batista	
Portuguese Touring Car Championship	D4: (Portugal) José Monroy	
Belgian Touring Car Series	(Belgium) Frédéric Bouvy (Belgium) Christian Kelders	
Belgian Touring Car Series	Makes: (Germany) BMW	
Belgian Touring Car Series	Junior: (Belgium) Michel Plennevaux (Belgium) Guy Katsers	
Italian Endurance Touring Car Championship	D1: (Italy) Roberto Colciago	
Italian Endurance Touring Car Championship	D1 Diesel: (Italy) Valentina Albanese	
Italian Endurance Touring Car Championship	D2: (Italy) Giorgio Vinella; D2: (Italy) Marco Baroncini	
Endurance Touring Car Series	Touring Master Cup: (Italy) Luca Cappellari; Touring Master Cup: (Switzerland) Enzo Calderari; Touring Master Cup: (Italy) Daniele Mulacchiè	
Endurance Touring Car Series	Superdiesel Challenge: (Italy) Sergio Peroni	
Spanish Endurance Cup	(Spain) Roberto Carretón (Spain) Luis Calleja	
Finnish Touring Car Championship	(Finland) Mikko Tiainen	
Speed World Challenge TC	(Brazil) Pierre Kleinubing	2009 Speed World Challenge season
KONI Cup	GS: (Canada) Ken Wilden	
KONI Cup	GS Teams: (United States) Rehagen Racing	
KONI Cup	GS Manufacturers: (United States) Ford	
KONI Cup	ST: (United States) Christian Miller	
KONI Cup	ST Teams: (Canada) Compass360 Racing	
KONI Cup	ST Manufacturers: (Japan) Honda	
New Zealand V8s	(New Zealand) Kayne Scott	2008–09 New Zealand V8 season
New Zealand Production Racing Championship	Class A: (New Zealand) Cody McMaster	
New Zealand Production Racing Championship	Class B: (New Zealand) Gene Rollinson	
New Zealand Production Racing Championship	Class C: (New Zealand) Brady Kennett	
Eurocup Mégane Trophy	(Netherlands) Mike Verschuur	2009 Eurocup Mégane Trophy season
Eurocup Mégane Trophy	Teams: (France) TDS Racing	2009 Eurocup Mégane Trophy season
Eurocup Mégane Trophy	Gentlemen: (France) Jean-Philippe Madonia	2009 Eurocup Mégane Trophy season
Batelco 2000cc Challenge	(Bahrain) Mustafa Al-Khan	
V8 Utes	(Australia) Jack Elsegood	2009 V8 Utes season
Fiats
Trofeo Abarth 500 Europe	(Italy) Emanuele Moncini	
Trofeo Abarth 500 Italia	(Italy) Salvatore Tavano	
Mini Challenge
Mini Challenge Australia	(Australia) Paul Stokell	2009 Australian Mini Challenge
Mini Challenge Germany	(Sweden) Daniel Haglöf	
Mini Challenge New Zealand	(New Zealand) Craig Innes	
Mini Challenge Spain	(Spain) Víctor Saez (Spain) David Izaguirre	
Mini Challenge United Kingdom	Overall: (United Kingdom) Luke Caudle	
Mini Challenge United Kingdom	S: (United Kingdom) Ollie Mortimer	
Mini Challenge United Kingdom	Club: (United Kingdom) Luke Caudle	
Mini Challenge United Kingdom	Novice: (United Kingdom) Luke Caudle	
Peugeots
Peugeot Spider Cup Denmark	(Denmark) Ronnie Bremer	
Copa Peugeot 207 THP	(Spain) Alex Royo	
Renault Clio Cup
Renault Clio Cup Denmark	(Denmark) Claus Christensen	
Renault Clio Cup UK	(United Kingdom) Phil Glew	
Renault Clio Cup Switzerland	(Switzerland) Daniel Hadorn	
Renault Clio Cup Spain	(Spain) Gonzalo Martín	
Renault Clio Cup France	(France) Nicolas Milan	
Renault Clio Cup Italy	(Italy) Cristian Ricciarini	
Renault Clio Cup Belgium	(Belgium) François Verbist	
Renault Junior Cup Sweden	(Sweden) Gustav Rickhamre	
SEAT León Supercopa
SEAT León Eurocup	(Hungary) Norbert Michelisz	2009 SEAT León Eurocup season
Spanish SEAT León Supercopa	(Spain) Marc Carol	
German SEAT León Supercopa	(Germany) Thomas Marschall	
Italian Trofeo SEAT León Supercopa	(Italy) Luca Trevisol (Italy) Matteo Zucchi	

== Truck racing ==
Series	Driver	Season article
European Truck Racing Championship	(Czech Republic) David Vršecký	2009 European Truck Racing Championship
European Truck Racing Championship	Teams: (Czech Republic) Buggyra International Racing System	2009 European Truck Racing Championship
Fórmula Truck	(Brazil) Felipe Giaffone	2009 Fórmula Truck season
Fórmula Truck	Teams: (Brazil) RM Competições	2009 Fórmula Truck season
Fórmula Truck	Manufacturers: (Germany) Volkswagen	2009 Fórmula Truck season
V8 Ute Racing Series	(Australia) Jack Elsegood	2009 Australian V8 Ute Racing Series

== See also ==
- List of motorsport championships
