= List of 2008 motorsport champions =

2008 motorsport champions
| Previous: 2007 | Next: 2009 |

This list of 2008 motorsport champions is a list of national or international auto racing series with a Championship decided by the points or positions earned by a driver from multiple races.

== Air racing ==
| Series | Driver | refer |
|---|---|---|
| Red Bull Air Race World Series | (Austria) Hannes Arch | 2008 Red Bull Air Race World Series |

== Dirt oval racing ==
| Series | Champion | Refer |
|---|---|---|
| Lucas Oil Late Model Dirt Series | (United States) Earl Pearson Jr. | |
| World of Outlaws Late Model Series | (United States) Darrell Lanigan | |
| World of Outlaws Sprint Car Series | (United States) Donny Schatz | |
| World of Outlaws Sprint Car Series | Teams: (United States) Tony Stewart Racing | |
| USAC National Sprint Car Series | (United States) Jerry Coons Jr. | |
| USAC Silver Crown Series | (United States) Jerry Coons Jr. | |
| USAC National Midget Championship | (United States) Cole Whitt | |

== Drag racing ==
| Series | Driver | refer |
|---|---|---|
| NHRA POWERade Championship | Top Fuel: (United States) Tony Schumacher | |
| NHRA POWERade Championship | Funny Car: (United States) Cruz Pedregon | |
| NHRA POWERade Championship | Pro Stock: (United States) Jeg Coughlin, Jr. | |
| NHRA Lucas Oil Drag Racing Series | Top Alcohol Dragster: (United States) Bill Reichert | |
| NHRA Lucas Oil Drag Racing Series | Top Alcohol Funny Car: (United States) Frank Manzo | |
| NHRA Lucas Oil Drag Racing Series | Competition Eliminator: (United States) Dan Fletcher | |
| NHRA Lucas Oil Drag Racing Series | Super Stock: (United States) Ricky Decker | |
| NHRA Lucas Oil Drag Racing Series | Stock Eliminator: (United States) Lee Zane | |
| NHRA Lucas Oil Drag Racing Series | Super Comp: (United States) Shawn Langdon | |
| NHRA Lucas Oil Drag Racing Series | Super Gas: (United States) Brian Forrester | |
| NHRA Lucas Oil Drag Racing Series; Division 1 | Top Alcohol Dragster: (United States) Arthur Gallant | |
| NHRA Lucas Oil Drag Racing Series; Division 1 | Top Alcohol Funny Car: (United States) Frank Manzo | |
| NHRA Lucas Oil Drag Racing Series; Division 1 | Competition Eliminator: (United States) Anthony Bertozzi | |
| NHRA Lucas Oil Drag Racing Series; Division 1 | Super Stock: (United States) Billy Leber, Jr. | |
| NHRA Lucas Oil Drag Racing Series; Division 1 | Stock Eliminator: (United States) Lee Zane | |
| NHRA Lucas Oil Drag Racing Series; Division 1 | Super Comp: (United States) Jason Kenny | |
| NHRA Lucas Oil Drag Racing Series; Division 1 | Super Gas: (United States) Mike Sawyer | |
| NHRA Lucas Oil Drag Racing Series; Division 1 | Super Street: (United States) Martin Ganjoin, Jr. | |
| NHRA Lucas Oil Drag Racing Series; Division 2 | Top Alcohol Dragster: (United States) Arthur Allen | |
| NHRA Lucas Oil Drag Racing Series; Division 2 | Top Alcohol Funny Car: (United States) Jay Payne | |
| NHRA Lucas Oil Drag Racing Series; Division 2 | Competition Eliminator: (United States) Arnie Martel | |
| NHRA Lucas Oil Drag Racing Series; Division 2 | Super Stock: (United States) Anthony Bertozzi | |
| NHRA Lucas Oil Drag Racing Series; Division 2 | Stock Eliminator: (United States) Brenda Grubbs | |
| NHRA Lucas Oil Drag Racing Series; Division 2 | Super Comp: (United States) Steve Cohen | |
| NHRA Lucas Oil Drag Racing Series; Division 2 | Super Gas: (United States) Brian Forrester | |
| NHRA Lucas Oil Drag Racing Series; Division 2 | Super Street: (United States) Mike Desio | |
| NHRA Lucas Oil Drag Racing Series; Division 2 | Top Sportsman: (United States) Jeffrey Barker | |
| NHRA Lucas Oil Drag Racing Series; Division 2 | Top Dragster: (United States) William Empke III | |
| NHRA Lucas Oil Drag Racing Series; Division 3 | Top Alcohol Dragster: (United States) Marty Thacker | |
| NHRA Lucas Oil Drag Racing Series; Division 3 | Top Alcohol Funny Car: (United States) Bobby Martin | |
| NHRA Lucas Oil Drag Racing Series; Division 3 | Competition Eliminator: (United States) Jason Coan | |
| NHRA Lucas Oil Drag Racing Series; Division 3 | Super Stock: (United States) Ricky Decker | |
| NHRA Lucas Oil Drag Racing Series; Division 3 | Stock Eliminator: (United States) John Keihn | |
| NHRA Lucas Oil Drag Racing Series; Division 3 | Super Comp: (United States) Shawn Langdon | |
| NHRA Lucas Oil Drag Racing Series; Division 3 | Super Gas: (United States) David Klomps | |
| NHRA Lucas Oil Drag Racing Series; Division 3 | Super Street: (United States) Ricky Shipp, Jr. | |
| NHRA Lucas Oil Drag Racing Series; Division 3 | Top Sportsman: (United States) Mitch Smith | |
| NHRA Lucas Oil Drag Racing Series; Division 3 | Top Dragster: (United States) Jeffrey Brown | |
| NHRA Lucas Oil Drag Racing Series; Division 4 | Top Alcohol Dragster: (United States) Aaron Tatum | |
| NHRA Lucas Oil Drag Racing Series; Division 4 | Top Alcohol Funny Car: (United States) Steve Harker | |
| NHRA Lucas Oil Drag Racing Series; Division 4 | Competition Eliminator: (United States) Scott Benham | |
| NHRA Lucas Oil Drag Racing Series; Division 4 | Super Stock: (United States) Jerry Emmons | |
| NHRA Lucas Oil Drag Racing Series; Division 4 | Stock Eliminator: (United States) Jarrod Granier | |
| NHRA Lucas Oil Drag Racing Series; Division 4 | Super Comp: (United States) Travis Prudhomme | |
| NHRA Lucas Oil Drag Racing Series; Division 4 | Super Gas: (United States) Rustin Mayse | |
| NHRA Lucas Oil Drag Racing Series; Division 4 | Super Street: (United States) Greg Parson | |
| NHRA Lucas Oil Drag Racing Series; Division 4 | Top Sportsman: (United States) Keith Raftery | |
| NHRA Lucas Oil Drag Racing Series; Division 4 | Top Dragster: (United States) Monroe Guest | |

== Drifting ==
| Series | Champion | Refer |
|---|---|---|
| British Drift Championship | (United Kingdom) Dave Walbrin | 2008 British Drift Championship |
| British Drift Championship | Semi-Pro: (United Kingdom) Steve Moore | 2008 British Drift Championship |
| D1 Grand Prix | (Japan) Daigo Saito | 2008 D1 Grand Prix series |
| D1 Grand Prix | D1SL: (Japan) Naoto Suenaga | 2008 D1 Grand Prix series |
| D1NZ | (New Zealand) Gaz Whiter | 2008 D1NZ season |
| Drift Allstars | (Republic of Ireland) Eric O'Sullivan | 2008 Drift Allstars |
| European Drift Championship | (United Kingdom) Ben Broke-Smith | 2008 European Drift Championship season |
| Formula D | (United States) Tanner Foust | 2008 Formula D season |
| NZ Drift Series | (New Zealand) Carl Ruiterman | 2008 NZ Drift Series |

== Hillclimb ==
| Series | Driver | refer |
|---|---|---|
| European Hill Climb Championship | Category 1: (Czech Republic) Miroslav Jakes | |
| European Hill Climb Championship | Category 2: (France) Lionel Regal | |
| European Hill-Climb Cup | Region 1 & 2: (Germany) Georg Plasa | |
| International Hill-Climb Challenge | Region 1: (Italy) Rudi Bicciato | |
| International Hill-Climb Challenge | Region 2: (Hungary) Laszlo Hernadi | |
| British Hill Climb Championship | (United Kingdom) Scott Moran | 2008 British Hill Climb Championship season |
| Historic Hill Climb Championship | Category 1: (Italy) Guido Belli | |
| Historic Hill Climb Championship | Category 2: (Czech Republic) Josef Michl | |
| Historic Hill Climb Championship | Category 3: (Czech Republic) Oskar Král | |

== Kart ==
| Series | Driver | refer |
KF1
| World KF1 Championship | (Italy) Marco Ardigò | |
| European KF1 Championship | (Italy) Marco Ardigò | |
| Asia-Pacific Championship KF1 | (Italy) Marco Ardigò | |
| German Kart Championship | (Netherlands) Jack te Braak | |
| Super 1 National KF1 Championship | (United Kingdom) Mark Litchfield | |
| WSK KF1 International Series | (Italy) Sauro Cesetti | |
| All-Japan Karting Championship (KF1) | (Japan) Daiki Sasaki | |
KF2
| European KF2 Championship | (Italy) Flavio Camponeschi | |
| WSK KF2 International Series | (Italy) Flavio Camponeschi | |
| Danish KF2 DASU Super Kart Cup | (Denmark) Bo Sørensen | |
| Finnish KF2 Championship | (Finland) Aleksi Tuukkanen | |
| Florida ICA Junior Winter Tour | (United States) Nick Neri | |
| Florida KF2 Winter Tour | (United States) Joey Wimsett | |
| French KF2 Championship | (France) Charles Lacaze | |
| KF2 Bridgestone Cup | (Switzerland) Alex Fontana | |
| KF2 Silver Cup | (United Kingdom) Mackenzie Taylor | |
| Italian KF2 Open Masters | (Italy) Matteo Ghidella | |
| Asia-Pacific Championship KF2 | (United Kingdom) Jack Harvey | |
| All-Japan Karting Championship (KF2) | Finals: (Japan) Hiroki Ōtsu | |
| All-Japan Karting Championship (KF2) | East: (Japan) Hiroki Ōtsu | |
| All-Japan Karting Championship (KF2) | West: (Japan) Shintaro Kawabata | |
| Spanish KF2 Championship | (Portugal) José Cautela | |
| Stars of Karting ICA Junior | National: (United States) Phil De La O | |
| Stars of Karting ICA Junior | East: (Colombia) Tatiana Calderón | |
| Super 1 KF2 Championship | (United Kingdom) Robert Foster-Jones | |
| Swedish KF2 Championship | (Sweden) Timmy Hansen | |
| Swiss KF2 Championship | (Switzerland) Patrick Müller | |
| Torneo Industrie | (Germany) Andre Hauke | |
KF3
| WSK KF3 International Series | (Netherlands) Nyck de Vries | |
| German Junior Kart Championship | (Netherlands) Nyck de Vries | |
| Asia-Pacific Championship KF3 | (Spain) Carlos Sainz Jr. | |
| Danish KF3 DASU Super Kart Cup | (Denmark) Nicolaj Møller Madsen | |
| Finnish KF3 Championship | (Finland) Jesse Anttila | |
| Florida KF3 Winter Tour | (Costa Rica) Danny Formal | |
| French KF3 Championship | (France) Brandon Maïsano | |
| Italian KF3 Open Masters | (Italy) Kevin Ceccon | |
| All-Japan Junior Kart Championship | Finals: (Japan) Aki Hirakawa | |
| All-Japan Junior Kart Championship | East: (Japan) Shou Tsuboi | |
| All-Japan Junior Kart Championship | West: (Japan) Aki Hirakawa | |
| KF3 Silver Cup | (Russia) Daniil Kvyat | |
| Torneo Industrie | (Russia) Daniil Kvyat | |
| Spanish KF3 Championship | (Spain) Gerard Barrabeig | |
| Stars of Tomorrow KF3 Championship | (United Kingdom) Jake Dennis | |
| Super 1 National KF3 Championship | (United Kingdom) Carl Stirling | |
| Swedish KF3 Championship | (Sweden) Måns Grenhagen | |
| Swiss KF3 Championship | (Switzerland) Yves von Aesch | |
| Swiss KF3 Bridgestone Cup | (Switzerland) Yves von Aesch | |
KZ1
| European KZ1 Championship | (Belgium) Jonathan Thonon | |
| Stars of Tomorrow KZ1 Championship | (United Kingdom) Tom Duggan | |
KZ2
| Austrian KZ2 Championship | (Austria) Andreas Schrangl | |
| ICC Central European Zone Trophy | (Austria) Andreas Schrangl | |
| Cambio Cup KZ2 | (Sweden) David Söderlund | |
| European KZ2 Championship | (France) Tony Lavanant | |
| Finnish KZ2 Championship | (Finland) Aki Rask | |
| French KZ2 Championship | (France) Thomas Mich | |
| German Kart Championship | (Belgium) Rick Dreezen | |
| Italian KZ2 Open Masters | (Finland) Simo Puhakka | |
| KZ2 Silver Cup | (Belgium) Jorrit Pex | |
| Spanish KZ2 Championship | (Spain) Borja Álvarez | |
| Stars of Karting ICC Junior National | (Canada) Michael Vincec | |
| Stars of Karting ICC Junior East | (Canada) Michael Vincec | |
| Stars of Karting ICC Junior West | (Canada) Michael Vincec | |
| Swedish KZ2 Championship | (Sweden) Mattias Ekman | |
| Swiss KZ2 Championship | (Switzerland) Philipp Witzany | |
| WSK KZ2 International Series | (Italy) Marco Ardigò | |
Minikarts/Cadets/Other series
| Belgian Minimax Challenge | (Netherlands) Max Verstappen | |
| Benelux Minimax Karting Series | (Netherlands) Max Verstappen | |
| Central States Super Series | (United States) Natalie Fenaroli | |
| Finnish Formula 250 Championship | (Finland) Turo Salmi | |
| Florida Cadet Winter Tour | (United States) Santino Ferrucci | |
| Florida Pro Shifter Winter Tour | (United States) Fritz Leesmann | |
| Florida Spec Racer Winter Tour | (United States) Andy Lee | |
| Formula Kart France | (Mexico) Manuel Cuadriello | |
| German Challenger Kart Championship | (United Kingdom) Tom Grice | |
| Italian 60 Baby Euro Trophy | (Italy) Pierluigi Silvestri, Jr. | |
| Mini 60 Euro Trophy | (Italy) Mattia Vita | |
| Spanish Cadet Championship | (Spain) Diego Rodriguez | |
| Stars of Tomorrow Cadet Championship | (United Kingdom) Roy Johnson | |
| Super 1 National Cadet Championship | (United Kingdom) Roy Johnson | |
| Stars of Tomorrow MiniMax Championship | (United Kingdom) Callum Bowyer | |
| Stars Of Tomorrow Rotax Junior Max Championship | (United Kingdom) Ross Wylie | |
| Super 1 National Honda Cadet Championship | (United Kingdom) Connor Jupp | |
| Swedish Formula Micro MKR Series | (Sweden) Victor Bouveng | |
| Swedish Formula Mini MKR Series | (Sweden) Fredrik Ulvesand | |
| Swedish Formula Yamaha Championship | (Sweden) Jimmy Eriksson | |
| Swiss 125 Sport Championship | (Switzerland) Rinaldo Grämiger | |
| Swiss Minikart Championship | (Switzerland) Antonio Barone | |
| Swiss Romand Mini Championship | (Switzerland) Gjergj Haxhiu | |
| Swiss Super Mini Championship | (Switzerland) Mathéo Tuscher | |
| Torneo Industrie Minikart | (Italy) Federico Savona | |
| Trofeo D'Autunno Minikart | (Italy) Steven Brotto | |
| China Karting Championship | ICA: (China) 钟肇番 | |
| China Karting Championship | NCA: (China) 张志鹏 | |
| China Karting Championship | NCB: (China) 赵梓辉 | |
| China Karting Championship | NCJ-A: (China) 陈卓轩 | |
| China Karting Championship | NCJ-B: (China) 凌聪 | |
| China Karting Championship | RMB125: (China) 李志刚 | |
Rotax Max
| Swedish Rotax Max Championship | (Sweden) Michael Andersson | |
| Rotax Max Challenge Sweden | (Sweden) Michael Andersson | |
| USA Junior Rotax Max Challenge | (United States) Mason Madej | |
| MRP Rotax Max Championship Series | (United States) Mason Madej | |
Superkart
| Australian Superkart Championship | 250 International: (Australia) Darren Hossack | 2008 Australian Superkart season |
| Australian Superkart Championship | 250 National: (Australia) Martin Latta | 2008 Australian Superkart season |
| Australian Superkart Championship | 125cc Gearbox: (Australia) Brad Stebbing | 2008 Australian Superkart season |
| Australian Superkart Championship | Rotax Light: (Australia) Michael Rogers | 2008 Australian Superkart season |
| Australian Superkart Championship | Rotax Heavy: (Australia) Mark Wicks | 2008 Australian Superkart season |
| Australian Superkart Championship | Rotax Junior: (Australia) Sean Whitfield | 2008 Australian Superkart season |
| British Superkart Championship | 250 National: (United Kingdom) Jason Dredge | |
| British Superkart Championship | 250 Division 1: (United Kingdom) Dave Harvey | |
| British Superkart Championship | F250N Masters Points: (United Kingdom) Matt Duncan | |
| British Superkart Championship | F250 Clubman: (United Kingdom) Sam Moss | |
| British Superkart Championship | F125 Open BSA: (United Kingdom) Paul Platt | |
| British Superkart Championship | F125 ICC BSA: (United Kingdom) Danny Butler | |
| British Superkart Championship | F125 ICC Masters: (United Kingdom) Daffyd Iles | |

== Motorcycle ==
| Series | Rider | refer |
|---|---|---|
| MotoGP World Championship | (Italy) Valentino Rossi | 2008 Grand Prix motorcycle racing season |
| 250cc World Championship | (Italy) Marco Simoncelli | 2008 Grand Prix motorcycle racing season |
| 125cc World Championship | (France) Mike di Meglio | 2008 Grand Prix motorcycle racing season |
| Superbike World Championship | (Australia) Troy Bayliss | 2008 Superbike World Championship |
| Supersport World Championship | (Australia) Andrew Pitt | 2008 Supersport World Championship |
| Superside FIM Sidecar World Championship | (Finland) Pekka Päivärinta (Finland) Timo Karttiala | |
| AMA Superbike Championship | (United States) Ben Spies | 2008 AMA Superbike Championship |
| AMA Supersport Championship | (United States) Ben Bostrom | |
| Australian Superbike Championship | (Australia) Glenn Allerton | |
| British Superbike Championship | (United Kingdom) Shane Byrne | 2008 British Superbike Championship |
| British Supersport Championship | (Australia) Glen Richards | |
| Endurance World Championship | (France) Suzuki Endurance Racing Team 1 | |
| AMA Formula Xtreme | (United States) Jake Zemke | |
| All Japan Road Race Championship | JSB1000: (Japan) Katsuyuki Nakasuga | |
| All Japan Road Race Championship | ST600: (Japan) Yoshiteru Konishi | |
| All Japan Road Race Championship | GP250: (Japan) Takumi Takahashi | |
| All Japan Road Race Championship | GP125: (Japan) Hiroyuki Kikuchi | |
| AMA Superstock Championship | (United States) Aaron Yates | |
| New Zealand Road Race Championship | Superbike: (New Zealand) Robbie Bugden | |
| New Zealand Road Race Championship | Supersport: (New Zealand) Dennis Charlett | |
| New Zealand Road Race Championship | F3: (New Zealand) Glen Williams | |
| New Zealand Road Race Championship | Pro Twin: (New Zealand) Karl Morgan | |
| New Zealand Road Race Championship | 125GP: (New Zealand) Cameron Jones | |
| New Zealand Road Race Championship | Sidecar: (New Zealand) Steve Bron (New Zealand) Dennis Simonsen | |
| New Zealand Road Race Championship | 125GP: (New Zealand) Cameron Jones | |
| Dutch Superbike Kampioenschap | (Netherlands) Arie Vos | |
| British 250GP Championship | (United Kingdom) Ben Johnson | |
| British 125GP Championship | (United Kingdom) Matthew Hoyle | |
| ACU Academy Cup | (United Kingdom) Tim Hastings | |
| ACU FSRA British F2 Sidecar Championship | (United Kingdom) Nick Crowe (United Kingdom) Mark Cox | |
| ACU FSRA British F2 Sidecar Cup | (United Kingdom) Steve Coombes (United Kingdom) Gary Partridge | |
| SunTrust MOTO-ST Series | SST Team: (United States) Aprilia USA; Lloyd Brothers Motorsports | |
| SunTrust MOTO-ST Series | SST Manufacturer: (Italy) Aprilia | |
| SunTrust MOTO-ST Series | GST Team: (United States) Touring Sport Ducati | |
| SunTrust MOTO-ST Series | GST Manufacturer: (Italy) Ducati | |
| SunTrust MOTO-ST Series | ST Team: (United States) M4 Avteq Racing | |
| SunTrust MOTO-ST Series | ST Manufacturer: (Japan) Suzuki | |
| National Superstock Championship | 1000: (United Kingdom) Steve Brogan | |
| National Superstock Championship | 600: (United Kingdom) Lee Johnston | |
| CitiBike Motorcycle Championship | Superbikes: (South Africa) Sheridan Morais | |
| CitiBike Motorcycle Championship | Supersport: (South Africa) Dane Hellyer | |
| Malaysian Super Series | Superbike: (Australia) Brent Odgers | |
| Malaysian Super Series | Supersports: (Malaysia) Mohd Syahnas Shahidan | |
| Malaysian Super Series | 135cc Production Bike: (Malaysia) Ahmad Nashrul Baharudin | |
| Malaysian Super Series | Kawasaki Cup: (Malaysia) Ahmad Nashrul Baharudin | |
| Malaysian Super Series | Bikerz Naza Cup: (Malaysia) Mohd Nazib Mohd Sahalan | |
| Malaysian Super Series | Msportbike Cup: (Malaysia) Martin Poh | |
| China Superbike Championship | Supersports: (Hong Kong) Chow Ho Wan | |
| China Superbike Championship | GP125cc A: (China) Zeng Jian-Heng | |
| China Superbike Championship | GP125cc B: (China) Zhang Hai-Long | |
| China Superbike Championship | 150cc Open: (China) Gao Lei | |
| Daily Star Cup | (United Kingdom) John Laverty | |
| Suzuki GSX-R European Cup | (Austria) Roland Resch | |
| Yamaha R1 Cup | (United Kingdom) Jon Kirkham | |
| KTM Super Duke Battle | (United Kingdom) David Wood | |
| Triumph Triple Challenge | (United Kingdom) Jack Sim | |

=== Motocross ===
| Series | Rider | refer |
|---|---|---|
| World Motocross Championship | MX1: (Italy) David Philippaerts | |
| World Motocross Championship | MX2: (South Africa) Tyla Rattray | |
| World Motocross Championship | MX3: (Belgium) Sven Breugelmans | |
| World Motocross Championship | Women's: (France) Livia Lancelot | |
| AMA Motocross Championship | (United States) James Stewart Jr. | |
| AMA Motocross Championship | Lites: (United States) Ryan Villopoto | |
| AMA Motocross Championship | WMA Pro National Champion: (United States) Ashley Fiolek | |
| AMA Motocross Championship | Loretta Lynn's Women's Amateur National Champion: (United States) Vicky Golden | |
| Australian Motocross Championship | Pro Open: (Australia) Jay Marmont | |
| Australian Motocross Championship | Pro Lites: (Australia) Luke George | |
| Australian Motocross Championship | ADB Manufacturers Cup: Pro Lites: Kawasaki | |
| Australian Motocross Championship | Women's: (Australia) Kristy Gillespie | |
| All-Japan Motocross Championship | IA1: (Japan) Takeshi Koikeda | |
| All-Japan Motocross Championship | IA2: (Japan) Yoshihide Fukudome | |
| All-Japan Motocross Championship | Women's: (Japan) Haruna Masu | |
| Motocross Malaysia | Expert: (New Zealand) Larry Blair | |
| Motocross Malaysia | Novice: (Malaysia) Hazlanshah Mohd Noor | |
| Motocross Malaysia | Veteran: (Malaysia) M. Chandran | |
| Motocross Malaysia | Junior: (Malaysia) Faizuddin Naim Ishak | |
| Motocross Malaysia | Trialbike: (Malaysia) Ahmad Nasaie Najmi | |
| Motocross Malaysia | Cubcross: (Malaysia) Eddy Fauzy Ismail | |
| Motocross Malaysia | Minibike: (Malaysia) Agung Pelita Irawan | |

=== Rally raid ===
| Series | Rider | refer |
|---|---|---|
| Cross-Country Rallies World Championship | Over 450 Rally Sport: (Italy) Oscar Polli | |
| Cross-Country Rallies World Championship | Over 450 Rally Production: (Poland) Marek Dabrowski | |
| Cross-Country Rallies World Championship | 450 Rally Sport: (Spain) Victor Rivera | |
| Cross-Country Rallies World Championship | 450 Rally Production: (Poland) Jacek Czachor | |
| Cross-Country Rallies World Championship | Quad: (Tunisia) Karim Dilou | |

== Open wheel racing ==
| Series | Driver | refer |
|---|---|---|
| FIA Formula One World Championship | (United Kingdom) Lewis Hamilton | 2008 Formula One World Championship |
| FIA Formula One World Championship | Constructors: (Italy) Ferrari | 2008 Formula One World Championship |
| GP2 Series | (Italy) Giorgio Pantano | 2008 GP2 Series |
| GP2 Series | Teams: (Spain) Barwa International Campos Team | 2008 GP2 Series |
| GP2 Asia Series | (France) Romain Grosjean | 2008 GP2 Asia Series |
| GP2 Asia Series | Teams: (France) ART Grand Prix | 2008 GP2 Asia Series |
| IndyCar Series | (New Zealand) Scott Dixon | 2008 IndyCar Series season |
| IndyCar Series | Rookie: (Japan) Hideki Mutoh | 2008 IndyCar Series season |
| A1 Grand Prix | A1 Team Switzerland(Neel Jani) | 2007–08 A1 Grand Prix season |
| Superleague Formula | (China) Beijing Guoan (Davide Rigon) | 2008 Superleague Formula season |
| Indy Lights | (Brazil) Raphael Matos | 2008 Indy Lights season |
| Indy Lights | Teams: (United States) AGR-AFS Racing | 2008 Indy Lights season |
| Atlantic Championship | (Finland) Markus Niemelä | 2008 Atlantic Championship season |
| Atlantic Championship | Teams: (United States) Newman Wachs Racing | 2008 Atlantic Championship season |
| Formula Nippon | (Japan) Tsugio Matsuda | 2008 Formula Nippon season |
| Formula Nippon | Teams: (Japan) Team Impul | 2008 Formula Nippon season |
| International Formula Master | (New Zealand) Chris van der Drift | 2008 International Formula Master season |
| International Formula Master | Teams: (Italy) JD Motorsport | 2008 International Formula Master season |
| International Formula Master | Formula Master Italia: (Italy) Marcello Puglisi | 2008 International Formula Master season |
| Euroseries 3000 | (France) Nicolas Prost | 2008 Euroseries 3000 season |
| Euroseries 3000 | Teams: (Italy) Bull Racing | 2008 Euroseries 3000 season |
| Italian Formula 3000 | (Colombia) Omar Leal | 2008 Euroseries 3000 season |
| EuroBOSS Series | (Austria) Ingo Gerstl | 2008 EuroBOSS Series |
| EuroBOSS Series | Teams: (Austria) TopSpeed | 2008 EuroBOSS Series |
| Formula Palmer Audi | (United Kingdom) Jason Moore | 2008 Formula Palmer Audi season |
| Formula Palmer Audi | Autumn Trophy: (Republic of Ireland) Niall Quinn | 2008 Formula Palmer Audi season |
| Formula Palmer Audi | FPA Shootout: (United Kingdom) Aaron Steele | 2008 Formula Palmer Audi season |
| ADAC Formel Masters | (Portugal) Armando Parente | 2008 ADAC Formel Masters |
| ADAC Formel Masters | Teams: (Germany) URD Motorsport | 2008 ADAC Formel Masters |
Formula Three
| Formula 3 Euro Series | (Germany) Nico Hülkenberg | 2008 Formula 3 Euro Series season |
| Formula 3 Euro Series | Teams: (France) ART Grand Prix | 2008 Formula 3 Euro Series season |
| Formula 3 Euro Series | Rookie: (Czech Republic) Erik Janiš | 2008 Formula 3 Euro Series season |
| Formula 3 Euro Series | Nation: France | 2008 Formula 3 Euro Series season |
| Asian Formula Three Pacific Series | (Belgium) Frédéric Vervisch | 2007–08 Asian Formula Three Pacific Series |
| Asian Formula Three Pacific Series | Teams: (United Kingdom) Team Goddard | 2007–08 Asian Formula Three Pacific Series |
| British Formula 3 Championship | (Spain) Jaime Alguersuari | 2008 British Formula 3 season |
| British Formula 3 Championship | National: (United Kingdom) Jay Bridger | 2008 British Formula 3 season |
| Finnish Formula Three Championship | (Finland) Mika Vähämäki | 2008 Finnish Formula Three Championship |
| Finnish Formula Three Championship | Teams: (Finland) ADRF | 2008 Finnish Formula Three Championship |
| German Formula Three Championship | Overall: (Belgium) Frédéric Vervisch | 2008 German Formula Three season |
| German Formula Three Championship | Trophy: (Austria) Marco Oberhauser | 2008 German Formula Three season |
| German Formula Three Championship | Rookie: (Colombia) Sebastián Saavedra | 2008 German Formula Three season |
| All-Japan Formula Three Championship | (Netherlands) Carlo van Dam | 2008 Japanese Formula 3 Championship |
| All-Japan Formula Three Championship | Teams: (Japan) TOM'S | 2008 Japanese Formula 3 Championship |
| All-Japan Formula Three Championship | National: (Japan) Hideki Yamauchi | 2008 Japanese Formula 3 Championship |
| Italian Formula Three Championship | (Italy) Mirko Bortolotti | 2008 Italian Formula Three season |
| Italian Formula Three Championship | Teams: (Italy) Lucidi Motors | 2008 Italian Formula Three season |
| Spanish Formula Three Championship | Overall: (Spain) Germán Sánchez | 2008 Spanish Formula Three season |
| Spanish Formula Three Championship | Teams: (Spain) Campos F3 Racing | 2008 Spanish Formula Three season |
| Spanish Formula Three Championship | F300 Cup: (France) Nelson Panciatici | 2008 Spanish Formula Three season |
| Formula 3 Sudamericana | (Brazil) Nelson Merlo | 2008 Formula 3 Sudamericana season |
| Formula 3 Sudamericana | Teams: (Brazil) Cesario Formula | 2008 Formula 3 Sudamericana season |
| Australian Drivers' Championship | C: (United Kingdom) James Winslow | 2008 Australian Drivers' Championship |
| Australian Drivers' Championship | N: (Australia) Chris Gilmour | 2008 Australian Drivers' Championship |
| Australian Drivers' Championship | T: (Australia) Andrew Mill | 2008 Australian Drivers' Championship |
| Toyota Racing Series | (New Zealand) Andy Knight | 2007–08 Toyota Racing Series |
| Austria Formula 3 Cup | (Austria) Patrick Tiller | |
| North European Zone Formula 3 Cup | (Russia) Vladimir Semenov | |
| Russian Formula Three Championship | (Russia) Vladimir Semyonov | 2008 Russian Formula Three Championship |
| Chilean Formula Three Championship | (Chile) Martin Scuncio | |
Formula Renault
| Formula Renault 3.5 Series | (Netherlands) Giedo van der Garde | 2008 Formula Renault 3.5 Series season |
| Formula Renault 3.5 Series | Teams: (France) Tech 1 Racing | 2008 Formula Renault 3.5 Series season |
| Formula V6 Asia | (Thailand) James Grunwell | 2008 Formula V6 Asia season |
| Formula V6 Asia | Teams: (Malaysia) Qi-Meritus Mahara | 2008 Formula V6 Asia season |
| Eurocup Formula Renault 2.0 | (Finland) Valtteri Bottas | 2008 Eurocup Formula Renault 2.0 season |
| Formula Renault Northern European Cup | (Finland) Valtteri Bottas | 2008 Formula Renault 2.0 NEC season |
| Formula Renault West European Cup | (Australia) Daniel Ricciardo | 2008 Formula Renault West European Cup season |
| Formula Renault West European Cup | Teams: (France) SG Formula | 2008 Formula Renault West European Cup season |
| Formula Renault UK Championship | C: (United Kingdom) Adam Christodoulou | 2008 Formula Renault UK season |
| Formula Renault UK Championship | G: (United Kingdom) Dean Stoneman | 2008 Formula Renault UK season |
| Formula Renault UK Championship | Winter Series: (United Kingdom) James Calado | 2008 Formula Renault UK Winter Series |
| Formula Renault BARC Championship | Overall: (United Kingdom) Ollie Hancock | 2008 Formula Renault BARC FR2000 season |
| Formula Renault BARC Championship | Club: (United Kingdom) Fraser Smart | 2008 Formula Renault BARC Club Class season |
| Formula Renault BARC Championship | Winter Series: (United Kingdom) James Theodore | |
| Formula Renault Northern European Zone | (Finland) Jesse Krohn | |
| Estonian Formula Renault Championship | (Finland) Jesse Krohn | |
| Finnish Formula Renault Championship | (Finland) Jesse Krohn | 2008 Finnish Formula Renault Championship season |
| Italian Formula Renault Championship | (Norway) Pål Varhaug | 2008 Italian Formula Renault Championship season |
| Italian Formula Renault Championship | Teams: (Switzerland) Jenzer Motorsport | 2008 Italian Formula Renault Championship season |
| Italian Formula Renault Championship | Winter Series: (Italy) Daniel Mancinelli | 2008 Italian Formula Renault Winter Series |
| Swiss Formula Renault Championship | (Switzerland) Christopher Zanella | 2008 Swiss Formula Renault Championship season |
| Fórmula Júnior FR2.0 Portugal | (Portugal) Gonçalo Araújo | 2008 Portuguese Formula Renault Championship season |
| Fórmula Júnior FR2.0 Portugal | Winter Series: (United Kingdom) James Calado | |
| Formula Renault 1.6 Argentina | (Argentina) Guido Falaschi | 2008 Formula Renault 1.6 Argentina |
| Formula 2000 Light | (Italy) Mario Bertolotti | 2008 Formula 2000 Light season |
| Formula 2000 Light | Winter Series: (Chile) Martin Scuncio | 2008 Formula 2000 Light Winter Series |
| Formul'Academy Euro Series | (France) Arthur Pic | 2008 Formul'Academy Euro Series season |
Formula BMW
| Formula BMW Europe | (Mexico) Esteban Gutiérrez | 2008 Formula BMW Europe season |
| Formula BMW Europe | Teams: (Germany) Josef Kaufmann Racing | 2008 Formula BMW Europe season |
| Formula BMW Americas | (United States) Alexander Rossi | 2008 Formula BMW Americas season |
| Formula BMW Americas | Teams: (United States) EuroInternational | 2008 Formula BMW Americas season |
| Formula BMW Pacific | (Hong Kong) Ross Jamison | |
| Formula BMW Pacific | Teams: (Malaysia) Qi-Meritus Mahara | |
| Formula Lista Junior | (Switzerland) Joël Volluz | 2008 Formula Lista Junior season |
| Formula Lista Junior | Teams: (Switzerland) Daltec Racing | 2008 Formula Lista Junior season |
Formula Ford
| Australian Formula Ford Championship | (Australia) Paul Laskazeski | 2008 Australian Formula Ford Championship |
| British Formula Ford Championship | (United Kingdom) Wayne Boyd | 2008 British Formula Ford season |
| Danish Formula Ford Championship | (Denmark) Kevin Magnussen | |
| Finnish Formula Ford Championship | (Finland) Jukka Honkavuori | |
| New Zealand Formula Ford Championship | (New Zealand) John Whelan | |
| F2000 Championship Series | (Norway) Anders Krohn | |
| Pacific F2000 Championship | (United States) Jeff Westphal | 2008 Pacific F2000 Championship |
| Scottish Formula Ford Championship | (United Kingdom) Graham Carroll | |
| South African Formula Ford Championship | (South Africa) Robert Wolk | |
| National Club Formula Ford Championship | Pre '90: (United Kingdom) Nigel Thompson | |
| National Club Formula Ford Championship | Post '89: (United Kingdom) Graham Carroll | |
| Club Formula Ford Star of Anglesey Series | Pre '90: (United Kingdom) Nigel Thompson | |
| Club Formula Ford Star of Anglesey Series | Post '89: (United Kingdom) Graham Carroll | |
| Northwest Club Formula Ford Championship | Class A: (United Kingdom) Chris Chisnall | |
| Northwest Club Formula Ford Championship | Class B: (United Kingdom) Graham Carroll | |
| Northwest Club Formula Ford Championship | Class C: (United Kingdom) Douglas Crosbie | |
| Northwest Club Formula Ford Championship | Class D: (United Kingdom) Ian Parkington | |
| Northwest Club Formula Ford Championship | Class E: (United Kingdom) Colin Williams | |
Other Junior formulae
| Gloria Scouting Cup | (Italy) Andrea Cecchellero | |
| Formula Gloria Netherlands | (Netherlands) Reynier de Pundert | |
| Formula Gloria Netherlands | B4 Cup: (Netherlands) Nick Etman | |
| Formula Maruti | (India) Gokul Krishna | 2008 Formula Maruti season |
| Skip Barber National Championship | (United States) Conor Daly | |
| Star Mazda Championship | (United States) John Edwards | 2008 Star Mazda Championship |
| Star Mazda Championship | Expert Series: (Canada) Chris Cumming | 2008 Star Mazda Championship |
| Star Mazda Championship | Masters: (United States) Chuck Hulse | 2008 Star Mazda Championship |
| Star Mazda Championship | Team: (United States) Andersen Racing | 2008 Star Mazda Championship |
| Star Mazda West Coast Championship | (United States) Patrick O'Neill | |
| Formula Mazda Challenge | Pro: (United States) Kevin Woods | |
| Formula Mazda Challenge | Standard: (United States) Bill Weaver | |
| Formula Azzurra | Trofeo Alboreto: (Italy) Edoardo Liberati | |
| Formula Master Italia | (Italy) Marcello Puglisi | |
| Formula Volkswagen South Africa Championship | (South Africa) Gavin Cronje | 2008 Formula Volkswagen South Africa Championship |
| Formula Volkswagen South Africa Championship | Teams: (South Africa) Morgado Racing | 2008 Formula Volkswagen South Africa Championship |
| Formula Challenge Japan | (Japan) Yuji Kunimoto | |
| JAF Japan Formula 4 | East: (Japan) Yūsuke Tsuchiya | 2008 JAF Japan Formula 4 |
| JAF Japan Formula 4 | West: (Japan) Shōta Hanaoka | 2008 JAF Japan Formula 4 |
Historic formulae
| Historic Formula One Championship | (Italy) Mauro Pane | |
| Historic Formula One Championship | Class A: (Brazil) Abba Kogan | |
| Historic Formula One Championship | Class B: (Portugal) Rodrigo Gallego | |
| Historic Formula One Championship | Class C: (United Kingdom) Peter Sowerby | |
| Historic Formula One Championship | Class D: (United Kingdom) Steve Hartley | |
| FIA Lurani Trophy for Formula Junior Cars | Class A: (United States) Jason Wright | |
| FIA Lurani Trophy for Formula Junior Cars | Class B: (United Kingdom) Duncan Rabagliati | |
| FIA Lurani Trophy for Formula Junior Cars | Class C: (United States) John Delane | |
| FIA Lurani Trophy for Formula Junior Cars | Class D: (United Kingdom) John Chisholm | |
| FIA Lurani Trophy for Formula Junior Cars | Class E: (Italy) Pierre Tonetti | |

== Rallying ==
| Series | Driver/Co-Driver | refer |
|---|---|---|
| World Rally Championship | (France) Sébastien Loeb (Monaco) Daniel Elena | 2008 World Rally Championship season |
| Junior World Rally Championship | (France) Sébastien Ogier (France) Julien Ingrassia | 2008 World Rally Championship season |
| Production World Rally Championship | (Austria) Andreas Aigner (Germany) Klaus Wicha | 2008 World Rally Championship season |
| Intercontinental Rally Challenge | (France) Nicolas Vouilloz (France) Nicolas Klinger | |
| All-Japan Rally Championship | (Japan) Norihiko Katsuta | |
| All-Japan Rally Championship | Co-Drivers: (Japan) Shigeru Sawada | |
| African Rally Championship | (Japan) Hideaki Miyoshi (Japan) Hakaru Ichino | |
| Asia-Pacific Rally Championship | (Australia) Cody Crocker | 2008 Asia-Pacific Rally Championship |
| Asia-Pacific Rally Championship | Co-Drivers: (Australia) Ben Atkinson | 2008 Asia-Pacific Rally Championship |
| Asia-Pacific Rally Championship | Manufacturers: (Japan) Subaru | 2008 Asia-Pacific Rally Championship |
| Asia-Pacific Rally Championship | Asia Cup: (Australia) Cody Crocker | 2008 Asia-Pacific Rally Championship |
| Asia-Pacific Rally Championship | Pacific Cup: (Australia) Dean Herridge | 2008 Asia-Pacific Rally Championship |
| Australian Rally Championship | (Australia) Neal Bates (Australia) Coral Taylor | |
| British Rally Championship | (United Kingdom) Guy Wilks | |
| Canadian Rally Championship | (Canada) Patrick Richard | 2008 Canadian Rally Championship |
| Canadian Rally Championship | Co-Drivers: (Canada) Alan Ockwell | 2008 Canadian Rally Championship |
| Central European Zone Rally Championship | S2000: (Poland) Michał Sołowow | 2008 Central European Zone Rally Championship |
| Central European Zone Rally Championship | S1600: (Italy) Carlo Fornasiero | 2008 Central European Zone Rally Championship |
| Central European Zone Rally Championship | Production: (Slovenia) Darko Peljhan | 2008 Central European Zone Rally Championship |
| Central European Zone Rally Championship | 2WD: (Italy) Rodolfo Cosimi | 2008 Central European Zone Rally Championship |
| Central European Zone Rally Championship | Historic: (Hungary) Andras Kovesdan | 2008 Central European Zone Rally Championship |
| China Rally Championship | International Class 2: (Australia) Dean Herridge (United Kingdom) Chris Murphy | |
| China Rally Championship | International Class Team: (China) Guyzhou Bailing | |
| China Rally Championship | National Class 1 Team: (China) FAW-VW Rally Team | |
| Codasur South American Rally Championship | (Paraguay) Victor Galeano | |
| Czech Rally Championship | (Czech Republic) Roman Kresta | 2008 Czech Rally Championship |
| Czech Rally Championship | Co-Drivers: (Czech Republic) Petr Gross | 2008 Czech Rally Championship |
| Desert Challenge | (Qatar) Nasser Al-Attiyah (Sweden) Tina Thorner | |
| Deutsche Rallye Meisterschaft | (Germany) Hermann Gassner Sr. | |
| Estonian Rally Championship | (Estonia) Aivo Hintser | 2008 Estonian Rally Championship |
| Estonian Rally Championship | Co-Drivers: (Estonia) Janek Tamm | 2008 Estonian Rally Championship |
| Estonian Rally Championship | Super 2000: (Estonia) Ott Tänak | 2008 Estonian Rally Championship |
| Estonian Rally Championship | Super 2000 Co-Drivers: (Estonia) Raigo Mõlder | 2008 Estonian Rally Championship |
| European Rally Championship | (Italy) Luca Rossetti (Italy) Matteo Chiarcossi | |
| Finnish Rally Championship | Group A: (Finland) Ari Vihavainen (Finland) Asko Sairanen | |
| Finnish Rally Championship | Group N: (Finland) Juha Salo (Finland) Mika Stenberg | |
| Finnish Rally Championship | Group n: (Finland) Joonas Lindroos (Finland) Jouni Lampinen | |
| French Rally Championship | (France) Dany Snobeck | |
| Hungarian Rally Championship | (Hungary) Csaba Spitzmüller | |
| Hungarian Rally Championship | Co-Drivers: (Hungary) Miklós Kazár | |
| Indian National Rally Championship | (India) Vikram Mathias | |
| Indian National Rally Championship | Co-Drivers: (India) PVS Murthy | |
| Italian Rally Championship | (Italy) Luca Rossetti | |
| Italian Rally Championship | Co-Drivers: (Italy) Matteo Chiarcossi | |
| Italian Rally Championship | Manufacturers: (France) Peugeot | |
| Middle East Rally Championship | (Qatar) Nasser Al-Attiyah | |
| Middle East Rally Championship | Co-Drivers: (United Kingdom) Chris Patterson | |
| NACAM Rally Championship | (Mexico) Ricardo Triviño | |
| New Zealand Rally Championship | (New Zealand) Hayden Paddon | 2008 New Zealand Rally Championship |
| New Zealand Rally Championship | Co-Drivers: (New Zealand) John Kennard | 2008 New Zealand Rally Championship |
| Polish Rally Championship | (France) Bryan Bouffier | |
| Rally America | (United States) Travis Pastrana | |
| Romanian Rally Championship | (Finland) Miettinen Jarkko | |
| Russian Rally Championship | (Russia) Alexandr Zjeludov (Ukraine) Irina Kolomijceva | |
| Scottish Rally Championship | (United Kingdom) Jimmy Girvan | |
| Scottish Rally Championship | Co-Drivers: (United Kingdom) Kirsty Riddick | |
| Slovak Rally Championship | (Slovakia) Jozef Béreš Jr. | |
| Slovak Rally Championship | Co-Drivers: (Slovakia) Róbert Müller | |
| South African National Rally Championship | (South Africa) Hergen Fekken | |
| South African National Rally Championship | Co-Drivers: (South Africa) Pierre Arries | |
| South African National Rally Championship | Manufacturers: (Japan) Toyota | |
| Spanish Rally Championship | (Spain) Enrique García Ojeda | |
| Spanish Rally Championship | Co-Drivers: (Spain) Jordi Barrabés | |

=== Ice racing ===
| Series | Driver | refer |
|---|---|---|
| Andros Trophy | (France) Alain Prost | |

=== Rally raid ===
| Series | Driver/Co-Driver | refer |
|---|---|---|
| Cross Country Rally World Cup | (France) Luc Alphand (France) Gilles Picard | |
| Cross Country Rally World Cup | Manufacturers: Repsol Mitsubishi Ralliart Japan | |
| Cross Country Rally World Cup | 2WD Trophy Drivers: (France) Dominique Housieaux (France) Jean-Michel Polato | |
| Cross Country Rally World Cup | 2WD Trophy Manufacturers: (France) Buggy Schlesser | |
| Cross Country Rally World Cup | Production T2 Drivers: (Kazakhstan) Artur Ardavichus (Kazakhstan) Denis Berezovskiy | |
| Cross Country Rally World Cup | Production T2 Manufacturers: Tecnosport Russia Nissan | |
| International Cup for Cross-Country Bajas | (Qatar) Nasser Al-Attiyah (Sweden) Tina Thorner | |
| International Cup for Cross-Country Bajas | Production T2: (Saudi Arabia) Majed Al-Ghamedi (Saudi Arabia) Amro Refaee | |

=== Rallycross ===
| Series | Driver | refer |
|---|---|---|
| European Rallycross Championship | Division 1: (Sweden) Kenneth Hansen | |
| European Rallycross Championship | Division 1A: (Finland) Jussi Pinomäki | |
| European Rallycross Championship | Division 2: (Czech Republic) Tomáš Kotek | |
| European Rallycross Championship | Rallycross Cup: (Belgium) Michaël De Keersmaecker | |
| ERA Cup | Division 1: (Sweden) Kenneth Hansen | |
| ERA Cup | Division 1A: (Finland) Jussi Pinomäki | |
| ERA Cup | Division 2: (Czech Republic) Roman Častoral | |
| ERA Cup | Rallycross Cup: (Belgium) Michaël De Keersmaecker | |
| Central European Zone Trophy | Division 1: (Austria) Alois Höller | |
| Central European Zone Trophy | Division 1A: (Hungary) Béla Gorácz | |
| Central European Zone Trophy | Division 2: (Czech Republic) Roman Častoral | |
| Central European Zone Trophy | Division 4: (Austria) Jürgen Weiß | |
| Central European Zone Trophy | Rallycross Cup: (Poland) Łukasz Zoll | |
| North European Zone Championship | Division 1: (Lithuania) Kazimieras Gudžiūnas | |
| North European Zone Championship | Fast 1600: (Latvia) Jānis Aleksejevs | |
| North European Zone Championship | Super 2000: (Lithuania) Vaidas Navickas | |
| North European Zone Championship | Open: (Latvia) Ilgonis Krūmiņš | |
| Rallycross Open Championship | Division 1: (United Kingdom) Mark Watson | |
| Rallycross Open Championship | Super National: (United Kingdom) Ben Power | |
| Rallycross Open Championship | Division 1A: (United Kingdom) Hal Ridge | |
| Rallycross Open Championship | Procar 2000: (United Kingdom) Stuart Emery | |
| Rallycross Open Championship | Procar 1600: (United Kingdom) Kenny Hall | |
| Rallycross Open Championship | Junior: (United Kingdom) Conor Flynn | |
| Rallycross Open Championship | Minicross: (United Kingdom) Shelley Wakeling | |
| Rallycross Open Championship | Revivals A: (United Kingdom) Robert Gooding | |
| Rallycross Open Championship | Revivals B: (United Kingdom) Dean Jones | |
| Rallycross Open Championship | Revivals C: (United Kingdom) Dominic Yates | |
| Austrian Rallycross Championship | Division 1: (Austria) Peter Ramler | |
| Austrian Rallycross Championship | Division 1A: (Austria) Mario Petrakovits | |
| Austrian Rallycross Championship | Division 2: (Czech Republic) Roman Častoral | |
| Austrian Rallycross Championship | Division 4: (Austria) Klaus Freudenthaler | |
| Austrian Rallycross Championship | Rallycross Cup: (Poland) Łukasz Zoll | |
| MSA British Rallycross Championship | (United Kingdom) Lawrence Gibson | |
| BRDA British Rallycross Championship | Supercar: (Republic of Ireland) Ollie O'Donovan | |
| BRDA British Rallycross Championship | Supermodified: (United Kingdom) James Bird | |
| BRDA British Rallycross Championship | Stock Hatch A: (United Kingdom) Julian Godfrey | |
| BRDA British Rallycross Championship | Stock Hatch B: (United Kingdom) Phil Chicken | |
| BRDA British Rallycross Championship | Junior: (United Kingdom) Daniel O'Brien | |
| BTRDA British Rallycross Championship | Supercar: (United Kingdom) Chris Langley | |
| BTRDA British Rallycross Championship | Supermodified 1900: (United Kingdom) Nick McAdden | |
| BTRDA British Rallycross Championship | Supermodified 1500: (United Kingdom) Dave Ewin | |
| BTRDA British Rallycross Championship | Stock Hatch A: (United Kingdom) Richard Horton | |
| BTRDA British Rallycross Championship | Stock Hatch B: (United Kingdom) Phil Chicken | |
| BTRDA British Rallycross Championship | Junior: (United Kingdom) Matt Thompson | |
| BTRDA British Rallycross Championship | Minicross: (United Kingdom) Kris Hudson | |
| Finnish Rallycross Championship | Division 1: (Finland) Marko Jokinen | |
| Finnish Rallycross Championship | SRC: (Finland) Jari-Pekka Kokko | |
| French Rallycross Championship | Division 1: (France) David Meslier | |
| French Rallycross Championship | Division 2: (France) Sébastien Tertrais | |
| French Rallycross Championship | Division 3: (France) Marc Morize | |
| French Rallycross Championship | Division 4: (France) David Deslandes | |
| Coupe Logan Rallycross | (France) Roman Ferrero | |
| German Rallycross Championship | Division 1: (Germany) Jörg Jockel | |
| German Rallycross Championship | Division 1A: (Germany) Rolf Volland | |
| German Rallycross Championship | Division 5: (Germany) Philip Schwarz | |
| Swedish Rallycross Championship | Division 1: (Sweden) Michael Jernberg | |
| Swedish Rallycross Championship | Super Nationell: (Sweden) Jimmy Holmkvist | |
| Swedish Rallycross Championship | Junior: (Sweden) Mattias Ledin | |
| Swedish Rallycross Championship | Nationell 2400: (Sweden) Per Engstrand | |

== Sports car ==
| Series | Driver | refer |
|---|---|---|
| American Le Mans Series | P1: (Germany) Marco Werner; P1: (Germany) Lucas Luhr | 2008 American Le Mans Series season |
| American Le Mans Series | P1 Team: (United States) Audi Sport North America | 2008 American Le Mans Series season |
| American Le Mans Series | P2: (Germany) Timo Bernhard; P2: (France) Romain Dumas | 2008 American Le Mans Series season |
| American Le Mans Series | P2 Team: (United States) Penske Racing | 2008 American Le Mans Series season |
| American Le Mans Series | GT1: (Denmark) Jan Magnussen; GT1: (United States) Johnny O'Connell | 2008 American Le Mans Series season |
| American Le Mans Series | GT1 Team: (United States) Corvette Racing | 2008 American Le Mans Series season |
| American Le Mans Series | GT2: (Germany) Jörg Bergmeister; GT2: (Germany) Wolf Henzler | 2008 American Le Mans Series season |
| American Le Mans Series | GT2 Team: (United States) Flying Lizard Motorsports | 2008 American Le Mans Series season |
| Australian GT Championship | (Australia) Mark Eddy | 2008 Australian GT Championship |
| Australian GT Championship | Challenge: (Australia) Richard Kimber | 2008 Australian GT Championship |
| Australian GT Championship | Production: (Australia) Tim Poulton | 2008 Australian GT Championship |
| Le Mans Series | P1: (France) Alexandre Premat; P1: (Germany) Mike Rockenfeller | 2008 Le Mans Series season |
| Le Mans Series | P1 Team: (Germany) Audi Sport Team Joest | 2008 Le Mans Series season |
| Le Mans Series | P2: (Netherlands) Jos Verstappen | 2008 Le Mans Series season |
| Le Mans Series | P2 Team: (Netherlands) Van Merksteijn Motorsport | 2008 Le Mans Series season |
| Le Mans Series | GT1: (France) Patrice Goueslard; GT1: (Germany) Guillaume Moreau | 2008 Le Mans Series season |
| Le Mans Series | GT1 Team: (France) Luc Alphand Adventures | 2008 Le Mans Series season |
| Le Mans Series | GT2: (United Kingdom) Robert Bell | 2008 Le Mans Series season |
| Le Mans Series | GT2 Team: (United Kingdom) Virgo Motorsport | 2008 Le Mans Series season |
| FIA GT Championship | GT1: (Germany) Michael Bartels; GT1: (Italy) Andrea Bertolini | 2008 FIA GT Championship season |
| FIA GT Championship | GT1 Team: (Germany) Vitaphone Racing | 2008 FIA GT Championship season |
| FIA GT Championship | GT2: (Finland) Toni Vilander; GT2: (Italy) Gianmaria Bruni | 2008 FIA GT Championship season |
| FIA GT Championship | GT2 Team: (Italy) AF Corse | 2008 FIA GT Championship season |
| Rolex Sports Car Series | DP: (United States) Scott Pruett; DP: (Mexico) Memo Rojas | 2008 Rolex Sports Car Series season |
| Rolex Sports Car Series | DP Teams: (United States) Chip Ganassi Racing | 2008 Rolex Sports Car Series season |
| Rolex Sports Car Series | DP Makes: (United States) Pontiac | 2008 Rolex Sports Car Series season |
| Rolex Sports Car Series | DP Chassis: (United States) Riley Technologies | 2008 Rolex Sports Car Series season |
| Rolex Sports Car Series | GT: (United States) Paul Edwards; GT: (United States) Kelly Collins | 2008 Rolex Sports Car Series season |
| Rolex Sports Car Series | GT Teams: (United States) Banner Racing | 2008 Rolex Sports Car Series season |
| Rolex Sports Car Series | GT Makes: (United States) Pontiac | 2008 Rolex Sports Car Series season |
| Super GT | GT500: (Japan) Satoshi Motoyama; GT500: (France) Benoît Tréluyer | 2008 Super GT season |
| Super GT | GT500 Team: (Japan) Petronas Toyota Team TOM'S | 2008 Super GT season |
| Super GT | GT300: (Japan) Kazuki Hoshino; GT300: (Japan) Hironobu Yasuda | 2008 Super GT season |
| Super GT | GT300 Team: (Japan) MOLA | 2008 Super GT season |
| ADAC GT Masters | (Germany) Tim Bergmeister | 2008 ADAC GT Masters season |
| ADAC GT Masters | Teams: (Germany) Reiter Engineering | 2008 ADAC GT Masters season |
| Belgian GT Championship | (Belgium) Fred Bouvy (Belgium) Damien Coens | |
| Belgian GT Championship | Teams: (Belgium) NGT Racing | |
| Belgian GT Championship | Teams D1: (Belgium) NGT Racing | |
| Belgian GT Championship | D2 Teams: (Belgium) Powercars Racing | |
| Belgian GT Championship | D3 Teams: (Belgium) First Motorsport | |
| GT3 European Championship | (France) James Ruffier (France) Arnaud Peyroles | |
| GT3 European Championship | Teams: (Switzerland) Matech GT Racing | |
| GT3 European Championship | Aston Martin Manufacturer Cup: (France) Thomas Accary (France) Frédéric Makowiecki (France) Pierre-Brice Mena (France) Jean-Claude Lagniez | |
| GT3 European Championship | Corvette Manufacturer Cup: (France) James Ruffier (France) Arnaud Peyroles | |
| GT3 European Championship | Ferrari Manufacturer Cup: (Argentina) José Manuel Balbiani | |
| GT3 European Championship | Ford Manufacturer Cup: (United Kingdom) Bradley Ellis | |
| GT3 European Championship | Porsche Manufacturer Cup: (United Kingdom) David Ashburn (United Kingdom) Richard Williams | |
| GT4 European Cup | (Belgium) Eric de Doncker | |
| GT4 European Cup | Light: (Germany) Christopher Haase | |
| GT4 European Cup | Teams: (Belgium) Motorsport98 | |
| KONI Challenge Series | GS: (United States) Joe Foster; GS: (Canada) Scott Maxwell | |
| KONI Challenge Series | GS Teams: (United States) Hyper Sport | |
| KONI Challenge Series | GS Makes: (United States) Ford | |
| KONI Challenge Series | ST: (Canada) Jamie Holtom | |
| KONI Challenge Series | ST Teams: (Canada) Georgian Bay Motorsports | |
| KONI Challenge Series | ST Makes: (United States) Chevrolet | |
| Australian GT Championship | (Australia) Mark Eddy | 2008 Australian GT Championship season |
| British GT Championship | GT3: (United Kingdom) James Gornall; GT3: (United Kingdom) Jon Barnes | 2008 British GT season |
| British GT Championship | GT4: (United Kingdom) Matt Nicoll-Jones; GT4: (United Kingdom) Stewart Linn | 2008 British GT season |
| FFSA GT Championship | GT: (France) Christophe Bouchut; GT: (France) Patrick Bornhauser | |
| FFSA GT Championship | GT3: (France) David Tuchbant; GT3: (France) Antoine Leclerc | |
| International GT Open | (Italy) Andrea Montermini (Italy) Michele Maceratesi | |
| SPEED World Challenge GT | (United States) Randy Pobst | |
| Finnish GT Championship | GT3: (Estonia) Indrek Sepp | |
| Italian GT Championship | GT2: (Italy) Max Busnelli; GT2: (Italy) Gabriele Lancieri | |
| WesBank V8 Supercars | (South Africa) Hennie Groenewald | |
| Asian GT Championship | Open: (Canada) Eric Cheung | |
| Asian GT Championship | Open Team: (Hong Kong) IMSS Racing | |
| Asian GT Championship | Class A: (Hong Kong) Frank Yee | |
| Asian GT Championship | Class A Team: (Macau) Galaxy FRD Racing | |
| Asian GT Championship | Class B: (Canada) Christian Chia | |
| Asian GT Championship | Class B Team: (Macau) Galaxy FRD Racing | |
| Britcar | Class 1: (United Kingdom) Andrew Beaumont (United Kingdom) Henry Taylor | |
| Britcar | Class 2: (United Kingdom) Rod Barrett (United Kingdom) Jan Persson (United Kingdom) Jay Shepherd | |
| Britcar | Class 3: (United Kingdom) Adrian Watt (United Kingdom) Chris Wilson (United Kingdom) Peter Duke | |
| Britcar | Class 4: (United Kingdom) Ian Lawson (United Kingdom) Anthony Wilds (United Kingdom) Mike Wilds | |
| Britcar GT Cup | (United Kingdom) Rod Barrett (United Kingdom) Jan Persson (United Kingdom) Jay Shepherd | |
| Britcar Production Cup | (United Kingdom) Ian Lawson (United Kingdom) Anthony Wilds (United Kingdom) Mike Wilds | |
| Britcar Production Saloons | (United Kingdom) Kevin Clarke (United Kingdom) Wayne Gibson | |
| Britcar Production Saloons | Class 1: (United Kingdom) Kevin Clarke (United Kingdom) Wayne Gibson | |
| Britcar Production Saloons | Class 2: (United Kingdom) Tom Gannon (United Kingdom) William Gannon | |
| Britcar Production Saloons | Class 3: (United Kingdom) Nick Gooch | |
| Britsports | (United Kingdom) Sean Mcinerney (United Kingdom) Michael Mcinerney | |
| Britsports | Class 1: (United Kingdom) Kevin Riley (United Kingdom) Ian Flux | |
| Britsports | Class 2: (United Kingdom) Sean Mcinerney (United Kingdom) Michael Mcinerney | |
| Britsports | Class 3: (United Kingdom) Steve Griffiths | |
| Britsports | Class 4: (United Kingdom) Jean Lou Rihon (United Kingdom) Nick Padmore | |
| Malaysian Super Series | Supercar: (Singapore) Mok Weng Sun | |
Porsches
| Porsche Supercup | (Netherlands) Jeroen Bleekemolen | |
| Porsche Carrera Cup Great Britain | (United Kingdom) Tim Harvey | 2008 Porsche Carrera Cup Great Britain |
| Porsche Carrera Cup Deutschland | (Germany) René Rast | |
| Porsche Carrera Cup Asia | (Canada) Darryl O'Young | |
| Porsche Carrera Cup Scandinavia | (Sweden) Jocke Mangs | |
| Porsche Carrera Cup Australia | (New Zealand) Craig Baird | 2008 Australian Carrera Cup Championship |
| Porsche GT3 Cup New Zealand | (New Zealand) Craig Baird | |
| Porsche Carrera Cup France | (France) Anthony Beltoise | |
| Porsche Carrera Cup Italia | (Italy) Luigi Ferrara | |
| Porsche Carrera Cup Japan | Class A: (Japan) Akihiro Tsuzuki | |
| Porsche Carrera Cup Japan | Class B: (Japan) Hiroshi Hamaguchi | |
| Porsche 944 Basic Cup | (Netherlands) Harry Verkerk | |
Ferrari Challenge
| Ferrari Challenge Europa | Trofeo Pirelli: (Italy) Max Blancardi | |
| Ferrari Challenge Europa | Copa Shell: (United Kingdom) Michael Cantillon | |
| Ferrari Challenge Europa | Dealer's Cup: (United Kingdom) Ferrari GB Dealer Team | |
| Ferrari Challenge Italia | Trofeo Pirelli: (Italy) Niki Cadei | |
| Ferrari Challenge Italia | Copa Shell: (Italy) Riccardo Ragazzi | |
| Ferrari Challenge Italia | Copa Concessionaire: (Italy) Motor | |
| Ferrari Challenge North America | (United States) Roberto Fata | |
Aston Martin Cup
| Aston Martin Asia Cup | (Japan) Kota Sasaki | |
Caterhams
| Caterham Eurocup | (United Kingdom) Richard Hay (United Kingdom) Clive Richards | |
| Superlight Challenge | (United Kingdom) David Mayes | |
| Caterham Roadsport Challenge | Roadsport A: (United Kingdom) Philip Broad | |
| Caterham Roadsport Challenge | Roadsport B: (France) Raphael Fiorentino | |
| Caterham Academy | (United Kingdom) Trevor Fowell | |
| Caterham Academy Netherlands | (Netherlands) Toon Rutgers | |
| Caterham Graduates Racing Club | Mega Graduates: (United Kingdom) Jamie Ellwood | |
| Caterham Graduates Racing Club | Super Graduates: (United Kingdom) Trevor Newman | |
| Caterham Graduates Racing Club | Classic Graduates: (United Kingdom) Graeme Smith | |
Ginettas
| Ginetta Junior Championship | (United Kingdom) Dino Zamparelli | 2008 Ginetta Junior Championship season |
| Ginetta Junior Championship | Winter Series: (United Kingdom) Josh Hill | |
| Ginetta G20 Championship | (United Kingdom) Spencer McCarthy | |
| Ginetta G20 Championship | Winter Series: (United Kingdom) Kieran Vernon | |
| Ginetta G50 Championship | (United Kingdom) Nigel Moore | |
| Ginetta G50 Championship | Winter Series: (United Kingdom) Tom Sharp | |
| Ginetta Cup Sweden | (Sweden) Hampus Rydman | |
Mazdas
| SCCA Playboy MX-5 Cup | (United States) Eric Foss | |
| RX-8 Party Race | (Japan) 出来 利弘 | |
| SCCA Nationals in Spec Miata | (United States) Eric Foss | |
| SCCA National Championship Runoffs in Spec Miata | (United States) Eric Foss | |
| NASA Spec Miata Challenge | (United States) Todd Lamb | |
| MaX5 Racing Championship | (United Kingdom) Richard Breland | |
| Mazda Max-5 Cup Nederland | (Netherlands) Mick Hoogwerf | |
Peugeots
| Peugeot THP Spider Cup | (United Kingdom) Simon Moulton | |
| Peugeot Spider Cup Denmark | (Germany) Ronny Wechselberger | |
Radicals
| European Master Series | SR8 LM: (Italy) Francesco Sini | |
| European Master Series | SR8: (United Kingdom) John Stanley | |
| European Master Series | SR3 1300: (United States) Jay Boyd | |
| European Master Series | SR3 1500: (Austria) Horst Felbermayr Jr. | |
Westfield
| Westfield Sports Car Championship | Overall: (United Kingdom) Andrew Spencer | |
| Westfield Sports Car Championship | Class A: (United Kingdom) Roger Green | |
| Westfield Sports Car Championship | Class B: (United Kingdom) Andrew Spencer | |
| Top Gear Westfield Challenge | (Netherlands) Louis Hutzezon Sr. (Netherlands) Louis Hutzezon Jr. | |

== Stock car ==
| Series | Driver | refer |
|---|---|---|
| NASCAR Sprint Cup Series | (United States) Jimmie Johnson | 2008 NASCAR Sprint Cup Series |
| NASCAR Sprint Cup Series | Manufacturers: (United States) Chevrolet | 2008 NASCAR Sprint Cup Series |
| NASCAR Nationwide Series | (United States) Clint Bowyer | 2008 NASCAR Nationwide Series |
| NASCAR Nationwide Series | Manufacturers: (Japan) Toyota | 2008 NASCAR Nationwide Series |
| NASCAR Craftsman Truck Series | (United States) Johnny Benson | 2008 NASCAR Craftsman Truck Series |
| NASCAR Craftsman Truck Series | Manufacturers: (Japan) Toyota | 2008 NASCAR Craftsman Truck Series |
| ARCA Re/Max Series | (United States) Justin Allgaier | 2008 ARCA Re/Max Series |
| NASCAR Camping World East Series | (United States) Matt Kobyluck | 2008 NASCAR Camping World East Series |
| NASCAR Camping World West Series | (United States) Eric Holmes | 2008 NASCAR Camping World West Series |
| NASCAR Canadian Tire Series | (Canada) Scott Steckly | 2008 NASCAR Canadian Tire Series |
| NASCAR Canadian Tire Series | Manufacturers: (United States) Dodge | 2008 NASCAR Canadian Tire Series |
| NASCAR Corona Series | (Mexico) Antonio Pérez | 2008 NASCAR Corona Series |
| NASCAR Mexico T4 Series | (Mexico) Rodrigo Echeverría | |
| Speedcar Series | (United Kingdom) Johnny Herbert | 2008 Speedcar Series season |
| World of Outlaws Late Model Series | (United States) Darrell Lanigan | |
| ASA Late Model Series - Challenge Division | (United States) Peter Cozzolino | |
| ASA Late Model Series - Northern Division | (United States) Eddie Hoffman | |
| ASA Late Model Series - Southern Division | (United States) Jimmy Lang | |
| Camaro Cup | (Sweden) Anders Brofalk | |
| Pickup Truck Racing | (United Kingdom) Gavin Seager | 2008 Pickup Truck Racing season |
| Turismo Carretera | (Argentina) Guillermo Ortelli | 2008 Turismo Carretera |

== Touring car ==
| Series | Driver | refer |
|---|---|---|
| World Touring Car Championship | Overall: (France) Yvan Muller | 2008 World Touring Car Championship season |
| World Touring Car Championship | Independents: (Spain) Sergio Hernández | 2008 World Touring Car Championship season |
| World Touring Car Championship | Teams: (Spain) SEAT | 2008 World Touring Car Championship season |
| Deutsche Tourenwagen Masters | (Germany) Timo Scheider | 2008 Deutsche Tourenwagen Masters |
| Deutsche Tourenwagen Masters | Teams: (Germany) HWA Team I | 2008 Deutsche Tourenwagen Masters |
| V8 Supercar Championship Series | (Australia) Jamie Whincup | 2008 V8 Supercar Championship Series |
| V8 Supercar Championship Series | Teams: (Australia) Triple Eight Race Engineering | 2008 V8 Supercar Championship Series |
| V8 Supercar Championship Series | Manufacturers: (United States) Ford | 2008 V8 Supercar Championship Series |
| British Touring Car Championship | Overall: (Italy) Fabrizio Giovanardi | 2008 British Touring Car Championship season |
| British Touring Car Championship | Independents: (United Kingdom) Colin Turkington | 2008 British Touring Car Championship season |
| British Touring Car Championship | Teams: (United Kingdom) Vauxhall | 2008 British Touring Car Championship season |
| Swedish Touring Car Championship | Overall: (Sweden) Richard Göransson | 2008 Swedish Touring Car Championship season |
| Swedish Touring Car Championship | Junior: (Sweden) Alexander Graff | 2008 Swedish Touring Car Championship season |
| Swedish Touring Car Championship | Caran Cup: (Sweden) Tobias Johansson | 2008 Swedish Touring Car Championship season |
| Turismo Carretera | (Argentina) Guillermo Ortelli | |
| Turismo Carretera | Pista: (Argentina) Agustín Canapino | |
| V8 Supercar Development Series | (Australia) Steve Owen | 2008 Fujitsu V8 Supercar Series |
| Danish Touring Car Championship | (Denmark) Jan Magnussen | |
| European Touring Car Cup | Super 2000: (Denmark) Michel Nykjær | 2008 European Touring Car Cup |
| European Touring Car Cup | Super Production: (Italy) Fabio Fabiani | 2008 European Touring Car Cup |
| European Touring Car Cup | Super 1600: (Germany) Ralf Martin | 2008 European Touring Car Cup |
| Finnish Touring Car Championship | (Finland) Mikko Eskelinen | |
| Campionato Italiano Superstars | (Italy) Gianni Morbidelli | |
| International Superstars Series | (Italy) Stefano Gabellini | |
| International Superstars Series | Teams: (Italy) CAAL Racing | |
| New Zealand V8s | (New Zealand) John McIntyre | |
| New Zealand V8s Development Series | (New Zealand) Michael Bristow | |
| Stock Car Brasil | (Brazil) Ricardo Maurício | 2008 Stock Car Brasil season |
| TC2000 | (Argentina) José María López | 2008 TC 2000 season |
| ADAC Procar Series | Division I: (Germany) Philip Geipel | |
| ADAC Procar Series | Division II: (Germany) Christopher Mies | |
| Super Taikyu | ST1: (Malaysia) Petronas Syntium Team | |
| Super Taikyu | ST2: (Japan) Sequential | |
| Super Taikyu | ST3: (Japan) M&M Sport | |
| Super Taikyu | ST4: (Japan) AGY motor sports | |
| Portuguese Touring Car Championship | (Portugal) César Campaniço | |
| Bridgestone Production Cars | Class A: (South Africa) Johan Fourie | |
| Bridgestone Production Cars | Class T: (South Africa) Graham Nathan | |
| Bridgestone Production Cars | Class B: (South Africa) Ben Morgenrood | |
| Bridgestone Production Cars | Class C: (South Africa) Theunis Eloff | |
| ATCS 1500Max Challenge | Super 1500 Max: (Malaysia) Syafiq Ali | |
| Asian Touring Car Championship | Div. 1: (Thailand) Jack Lemvard | |
| Asian Touring Car Championship | Div. 1 Teams: (Germany) Liqui Moly Team Engstler | |
| Asian Touring Car Championship | Div. 2: (Malaysia) Eric Yeo | |
| Asian Touring Car Championship | Div. 2 Teams: Team IMSP | |
| BRL V6 | (Netherlands) Donald Molenaar | 2008 BRL V6 season |
| SAXMAX Great Britain | (United Kingdom) James Colburn | |
| JTCC Sweden | (Sweden) Alexander Graff | |
| Australian Commodore Cup | (Australia) Michael Tancredi | |
| Australian Production Car Championship | (Australia) Colin Osborne | 2008 Australian Production Car Championship |
| Australian Manufacturers' Championship | (South Korea) Hyundai | 2008 Australian Production Car Championship |
| Australian Saloon Car Championship | (Australia) Steve Kwiatkowski | |
| Australian Sports Sedan Championship | (Australia) Darren Hossack | 2008 Australian Sports Sedan Series |
| Malaysian Super Series | Super Saloon: (Malaysia) Boy Wong Yew Choong | |
| Malaysian Super Series | Super Sixteen: (Malaysia) Boy Wong Yew Choong | |
| Malaysian Super Series | Super Compact Turbo: (Malaysia) K. Perajun | |
| Malaysian Super Series | Super Compact: (Malaysia) Mohammed Khairul Hairodin | |
| China Circuit Championship | 1600cc Drivers: (China) Guo Hai Sheng | |
| China Circuit Championship | 1600cc Team: (China) Dongfeng Nissan Ghiasports Team | |
| China Circuit Championship | 2000cc Drivers: (Hong Kong) Ken Look | |
| CJ Super Race Championship | GT Team: (South Korea) Kixx Prime | |
| Eurocup Mégane Trophy | (France) Michaël Rossi | 2008 Eurocup Mégane Trophy |
| Eurocup Mégane Trophy | Teams: (France) Tech 1 Racing | 2008 Eurocup Mégane Trophy |
| Eurocup Mégane Trophy | Gentleman: (France) Jean-Philippe Madonia | 2008 Eurocup Mégane Trophy |
Civic Cup
| Inter Cup | (Japan) Takayuki Matsui | |
| West Japan Series | (Japan) Koichi Kobayashi | |
| East Japan Series | (Japan) Yoshiaki Yamaguchi | |
Chevrolets
| Chevrolet Lumina CSV Championship | (Bahrain) Fahad Al Musalam | |
Dacia Logan Cup
| ADAC Dacia Logan Clubsport | (Germany) Ahrens Racing Team | |
Ford Racing Mustang Challenge
| Mustang Challenge for the Miller Cup | (United States) Andrew Caddell | |
Mini Challenge
| Australian Mini Challenge | (Australia) Neil McFadyen | |
| Mini Challenge Germany | (Germany) Thomas Neumann | |
| Mini Challenge New Zealand | (New Zealand) Brent Collins | |
March Cup
| March Champion Cup | (Japan) Kato Sugawara | |
| West Japan Series | (Japan) Kazunari Takenaka | |
| East Japan Series | (Japan) Satoshi Atsuya | |
Clio Cup
| Renault Clio Cup UK | (United Kingdom) Ben Winrow | |
| Formulas Argentina | (Argentina) Facundo Della Motta | |
| Renault Clio Cup Belux | (Belgium) François Verbist | |
| Copa Renault Clio | (Brazil) José Cordova | |
| Renault Clio Cup Denmark | (Denmark) Per Poulsen | |
| France Clio Cup | (France) Maxime Martin | |
| Clio Cup Italia | (Italy) Simone Di Luca | |
| Dunlop Sportmaxx Clio Cup | (Netherlands) Pim van Riet | |
| Renault Junior Clio Cup Sweden | (Sweden) Jesper Nilsson | |
SEATs
| SEAT León Eurocup | (Spain) Oscar Nogués | 2008 SEAT León Eurocup season |
| SEAT León Supercopa Germany | (Denmark) Nicki Thiim | |
| SEAT León Supercopa Italy | (Italy) Roberto Russo | |
| SEAT León Supercopa Spain | (United Kingdom) Tom Boardman | |
| SEAT Cupra Championship | (United Kingdom) Jonathan Adam | |
Swift Cup
| Swift Sport Cup New Zealand | (New Zealand) Cody McMaster | |
| Formido Swift Cup | (Netherlands) Jeroen den Boer | |
Netz Cup Vitz Race
| Grand Finals | (Japan) Takao Ohnishi | |
| Kanto Series | (Japan) Takao Ohnishi | |
| Hokkaido Series | (Japan) Shōji Tachi | |
| Tohoku Series | (Japan) Masako Koyama | |
| Kansai Series | (Japan) Takahito Komatsu | |
| Nishi Series | (Japan) Kosuke Horikawa | |
Volkswagen Cup
| Volkswagen Polo Cup Denmark | (Denmark) Dennis Elgaard | |
| ADAC Volkswagen Polo Cup | (Germany) Alexander Rambow | |
| Engen Volkswagen Cup | (South Africa) Jared Mortimer | |
| VW Racing Cup | (United Kingdom) Joe Fulbrook | |
| Volkswagen Jetta TDI Cup | (United States) Josh Hurley | |

== Truck racing ==
| Series | Driver | Season article |
|---|---|---|
| European Truck Racing Championship | (Czech Republic) David Vršecký | 2008 European Truck Racing Championship |
| European Truck Racing Championship | Teams: (Czech Republic) Buggyra International Racing System | 2008 European Truck Racing Championship |
| British Truck Racing Championship | Class A: (United Kingdom) Stuart Oliver | |
| British Truck Racing Championship | Class B: (Netherlands) Cees Zanbergen | |
| Fórmula Truck | (Brazil) Wellington Cirino | 2008 Fórmula Truck season |
| Fórmula Truck | Teams: (Brazil) ABF Mercedes-Benz | 2008 Fórmula Truck season |
| Fórmula Truck | Manufacturers: (Germany) Mercedes-Benz | 2008 Fórmula Truck season |
| V8 Ute Racing Series | (Australia) Layton Crambrook | 2008 V8 Ute Racing Series |

== Water surface racing ==
| Series | Driver | refer |
Offshore powerboat racing
| C1 World Powerboat Championship | (United Arab Emirates) Victory 1 ( (United Arab Emirates) Mohammed Al Marri (United Arab Emirates) Nadir Bin Hendi) | |
| C1 Middle East Championship | (United Arab Emirates) Victory 1 ( (United Arab Emirates) Mohammed Al Marri (United Arab Emirates) Nadir Bin Hendi) | |
| C1 European Championship | (Norway) Jotun 90 (Norway) Inge Brigt Aarbakke (Norway) Jorn Tandberg | |
| Powerboat P1 World Championship | Evolution: (United Kingdom) Fountain Worldwide 1st4boats.com | |
| Powerboat P1 World Championship | Supersport: (Italy) Conam Yachts | |
| Super Boat | Superboat Unlimited: (United States) Mike Seebold (United States) John Tomlinson | |
| Super Boat | Turbine: (United States) Marc Granet (United States) Scott Begovich | |
| Super Boat | Superboat Vee Unlimited Class I: (United States) Joe Sgro | |
| Super Boat | Superboat Vee Unlimited Class II: (United States) Johnny Stanch | |
| Super Boat | Superboat 750: (United States) Tom Abrams (United Kingdom) Steve Curtis | |
| Super Boat | Superboat 850: (United States) William Mauff | |
| Super Boat | Super Vee: (United States) Brett Lee Furshman (United States) Billy Glueck | |
| Super Boat | Super Cat: (United States) Paul Whittier | |
| Super Boat | Superboat Stock: (United States) Robert Noble | |
| Super Boat | Manufacturer Production P1: (United States) Craig Wilson | |
| Super Boat | Manufacturer Production P2: (United States) Brett Lee Furshman (United States) Billy Glueck | |
| Super Boat | Manufacturer Production P3: (United States) Richard Davis | |
| Super Boat | Manufacturer Production P4: (United States) Jason Zolecki | |
| Super Boat | Manufacturer Production P5: (United States) Bob Spitulski | |
| Offshore Super Series | OSS 750: (United States) Talking Trash | |
| Offshore Super Series | OSSC: (United States) Renegade | |
| Offshore Super Series | OSSC850: (United States) WHM Motorsports | |
| Offshore Super Series | OSSCL: (United States) AMSOIL | |
| Offshore Super Series | OSSCO: (United States) Car Credit 411.com | |
| Offshore Super Series | OSSCX: (United States) Team CRC | |
| Offshore Super Series | OSSTX: (United States) Miss Geico | |
| Offshore Super Series | OSSV: (United States) Miccosukee Indian Gaming | |
| Offshore Super Series | OSSVL: (United States) Wild Ride | |
| Offshore Super Series | P5: (United States) Garbage Man | |
| Offshore Super Series | P6: (United States) Ultimate Rush Racing.com | |
| OPA High Points Championship | Class 100: (United States) Cleveland Construction | |
| OPA High Points Championship | Class 200: (United States) Wazzup | |
| OPA High Points Championship | Class 300: (United States) Boat Responsibly | |
| OPA High Points Championship | Class 400: (United States) Simmon's Racing | |
| OPA High Points Championship | Class 500: (United States) Specialized Racing | |
| OPA High Points Championship | Class 600: (United States) Reindl One Design | |
| Australian Offshore Championship | CLASS 1: (Australia) Maritimo | |
| Australian Offshore Championship | Supercat Outboard: (Australia) Saracen | |
| Australian Offshore Championship | Supercat Outboard Lite: (Australia) Ezy Does It | |
| Australian Offshore Championship | Super Vee Lite: (Australia) Grumpy Mongrel | |
| Australian Offshore Championship | Haines Suzuki One Make: (Australia) Acme | |
Hydroplane racing
| APBA Unlimited Hydroplane | Team: (United States) Miss Madison | |
| APBA Unlimited Hydroplane | Driver: (United States) Steve David | |
| APBA Grand National Hydro | (United States) Donna Macy | |
| APBA National Modified | (United States) Steve Webster | |
Formula Powerboat Racing
| F1 Powerboat World Championship | Evolution: (United States) Jay Price | |
| ChampBoat Series | F1 ChampBoat: (United States) Terry Rinker | |
| ChampBoat Series | Champ-2: (United States) Mark Proffit | |
Circuit racing
| UIM International Motorboat Championship | S-550: (Poland) Lechoslaw Rybarczyk | |
| UIM Motorboat European Championship | JT-250: (Estonia) Rasmus Haugasmägi | |
Drag boat racing
| IHBA Drag Boat Series; National | Top Fuel Hydro: (United States) John Haas | |
| IHBA Drag Boat Series; National | Top Alcohol Hydro: (United States) Kent Price | |
| IHBA Drag Boat Series; National | Top Alcohol Flat: (United States) Steve Westerfield | |
| IHBA Drag Boat Series; Division 1 | Pro Mod: (United States) Shawn Reed | |
| IHBA Drag Boat Series; Division 1 | Pro Comp Eliminator: (United States) Brad Parrak | |
| IHBA Drag Boat Series; Division 1 | Pro Eliminator: (United States) Allen Forsyth | |
| IHBA Drag Boat Series; Division 1 | Top Eliminator: (United States) Ralph Richardson | |
| IHBA Drag Boat Series; Division 1 | Mod Eliminator: (United States) Rick Barretta | |
| IHBA Drag Boat Series; Division 1 | Stock Eliminator: (United States) Roger Silva | |
| IHBA Drag Boat Series; Division 1 | River Racer: (United States) Roger Sayles | |
| IHBA Drag Boat Series; Division 1 | Personal Watercraft 2: (United States) Mary Lillian Silva | |
| IHBA Drag Boat Series; Division 1 | Personal Watercraft 1: (United States) Gareth Harter | |
| IHBA Drag Boat Series; Division 2 | Pro Mod: (United States) Brutus Utter | |
| IHBA Drag Boat Series; Division 2 | Pro Comp Eliminator: (United States) Randy White | |
| IHBA Drag Boat Series; Division 2 | Pro Eliminator: (United States) Bryan Sheckler | |
| IHBA Drag Boat Series; Division 2 | Top Eliminator: (United States) Dallas Collier | |
| IHBA Drag Boat Series; Division 2 | Mod Eliminator: (United States) Greg Carr | |
| IHBA Drag Boat Series; Division 2 | Stock Eliminator: (United States) Brad Klug | |
| IHBA Drag Boat Series; Division 2 | River Racer: (United States) Mark Creel | |
| IHBA Drag Boat Series; Division 2 | Personal Watercraft 2: (United States) Tyler Tutle | |
| IHBA Drag Boat Series; Division 2 | Personal Watercraft 1: (United States) David Carroll | |
| IHBA Drag Boat Series; Division 3 | Pro Mod: (United States) Brutus Utter | |
| IHBA Drag Boat Series; Division 3 | Pro Comp Eliminator: (United States) Milton Tolen | |
| IHBA Drag Boat Series; Division 3 | Pro Eliminator: (United States) Ed Anderson | |
| IHBA Drag Boat Series; Division 3 | Top Eliminator: (United States) Dallas Collier | |
| IHBA Drag Boat Series; Division 3 | Mod Eliminator: (United States) Greg Carr | |
| IHBA Drag Boat Series; Division 3 | Stock Eliminator: (United States) Bill Henderson | |
| IHBA Drag Boat Series; Division 3 | River Racer: (United States) Mark Creel | |
Aquabike racing
| UIM Aquabike Class Pro | Freestyle: (Brazil) Lee Stone | |
| UIM Aquabike Class Pro | Rallye Jet Runabout Super Stock: (France) Cyrille Lemoine | |
| UIM Aquabike Class Pro | Offshore: (France) Cyrille Lemoine | |

== See also ==
- List of motorsport championships
- Auto racing
