= 2009 Fórmula Truck season =

2009 Fórmula Truck

Seasons
- ← 2008 2010 →

The 2009 Fórmula Truck season was the 14th Fórmula Truck season. It began on March 8 at Guaporé and ended on December 13 at Brasília.

== Calendar and results ==
All races were held in Brazil, excepting round at Autódromo Juan y Oscar Gálvez, that was held in Argentina.

Round	Circuit	Date	Winning driver	Winning team
1	Autódromo Internacional de Guaporé	March 8	Felipe Giaffone	RM Competições
2	Autódromo Internacional Virgílio Távora	April 26	Geraldo Piquet	ABF Competições
3	Autódromo Internacional Ayrton Senna, Caruaru	May 17	Felipe Giaffone	RM Competições
4	Autódromo Internacional Ayrton Senna, Goiânia	June 14	Valmir Benavides	RM Competições
5	Autódromo José Carlos Pace	July 19	Roberval Andrade	RVR Corinthians Motorsport
6	Autódromo Internacional Ayrton Senna, Londrina	August 16	Felipe Giaffone	RM Competições
7	Autódromo Juan y Oscar Gálvez	September 20	Felipe Giaffone	RM Competições
8	Autódromo Internacional de Santa Cruz do Sul	October 25	Roberval Andrade	RVR Corinthians Motorsport
9	Autódromo Internacional de Curitiba	November 15	Wellington Cirino	ABF Competições
10	Autódromo Internacional Nelson Piquet, Brasília	December 13	Roberval Andrade	RVR Corinthians Motorsport
