= Jonathan De Castro =

Dominican racing driver

- Born: February 11, 1988 (age 37); Santo Domingo, Dominican Republic
- Awards: 2005 Dominican National Rotax-Max Sr. Champion; 2006 Caribbean Rotax-Max Sr. Champeon
- Statistics up to date as of January 12, 2007.

Jonathan Raphael De Castro Walther (born February 11, 1988, in Santo Domingo, Dominican Republic) is a Dominican racing driver. He is the son of Rafael De Castro and a German, Monica Walther. He was the first Dominican to be granted a Formula BMW car license.

== History ==
He has been a karting driver for the 3 years easily winning the karting championship in the Rotax Max class in the Dominican Republic in only his second year taking 6 wins out of 7 participated. He also went on to win the first event of the NACAM-FIA karting championship in the TAG class. In July 2005 he tasted his first experience with the Formula BMW car, in which he tested in Valencia during a Formula BMW USA Licensing course for 2006. At the end of 2005 after winning the Rotax Max challenge in the Caribbean, he also participated in the Rotax Max World Championship hosted in the country of Malaysia.

In 2006, the Dominican driver spent one more year in karting, and participated in a selection hosted in Costa Rica by the renounced French school La Filière FFSA, where he was selected among several drivers all over South America, competing for a scholarship for the Formula Renault Campus 2007 season. Countries in the selection included: Guatemala, El Salvador, Costa Rica, Dominican Republic, Ecuador, Colombia, and Mexico. During 2006 he also participated in some karting races in championships such as Stars of Karting, the Florida Winter Tour and a 4-hour endurance race in New Castle Motorsport speedway where 2005 IRL Champion Dan Wheldon Participated.

In 2007, after announcing that the Dominican Government through SEDEFIR will be sponsoring the young driver, De Castro moved up from karting into the Formula Renault Campus with the Auto Sport Academy, formally known as ‘La Filiere’. The renounced driver training organization, (located in Le Mans, France), will host 14 race events for the 2007 season with 29 drivers. The Auto Sport Academy is responsible to the starting of careers of drivers such as: Sébastien Bourdais, Franck Montagny and Stéphane Sarrazin.

As of 2008, De Castro was the only Dominican to be involved in the Formula categories in Europe.

In August 2008, De Castro was crowned champion of the category corresponding to TAG Formula Karting Championship in South Florida. He came first in the same event in 2009.
