= Ben Collins (racing driver) =

British racing driver (born 1975)

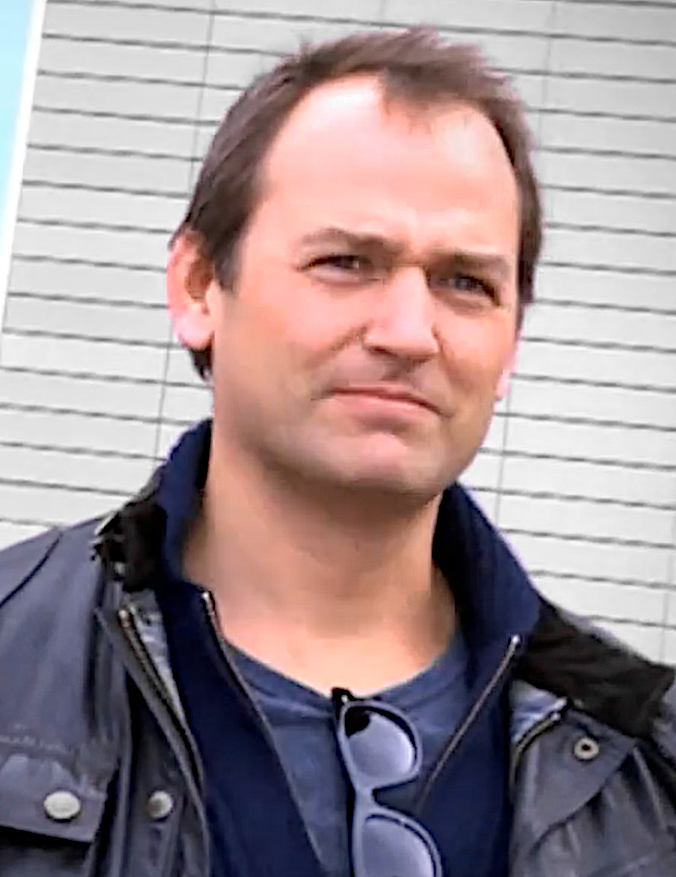
- Collins in 2014
- Nationality: (United Kingdom) British
- Born: Benjamin Lievesley Immi Collins; 13 February 1975 (age 51) Bristol, United Kingdom
- Categorisation: FIA Gold (until 2013); FIA Silver (2014–)

Previous series
- 2010; 2009; 2006–07; 2006, 2010–11; 2005; 2003; 2001; 2000; 1999; 1998; 1997; 1996–98, 2000–01; 1995: BTCC; V8 Supercars; FIA GT3; Le Mans Series; British GT Championship; ASCAR; FIA Sportscars; French Formula Three; Indy Lights; Int'l Sports Racing; FIA GT Championship; British Formula 3; Formula Vauxhall Junior

Championship titles
- 2003: ASCAR

24 Hours of Le Mans career
- Years: 2001, 2002, 2011, 2014
- Teams: Team Ascari, RML
- Best finish: 12th
- Class wins: 0

Benjamin Lievesley Immi Collins (born 13 February 1975) is a British racing driver. He has competed in motor racing since 1994 in many categories, from Formula Three and Indy Lights to sportscars, GT racing and stock cars. In his role as The Stig, he co-presented the British motoring television programme Top Gear from 2003 to 2010.

Collins finished second in the 2000 Masters of Formula 3. He was the fastest driver at the 2001 Le Mans 24 hours race for approximately four hours during the rain at night in his debut at the event. After winning the European Stock Car Championship in 2003 ASCAR stock car racing he was signed by PDM Racing to do selected rounds of the 2004 Indy Racing League, but the car never appeared. In 2005, he competed in the British GT Championship in a Porsche 996 GT3, winning races on the way before moving up to the FIA GT Series with Ascari where he led races and scored several pole positions.

In addition to racing, Collins's company Collins Autosport Limited provides precision and stunt driving services, particularly for BBC Television, including Top Gear and Top Gear Live, as well as for the film industry, such as driving James Bond's car in Quantum of Solace and Casino Royale, and Eve Moneypenny's car in Skyfall.

In August 2010, The Sunday Times alleged that Collins may be one of the identities of the Stig—an otherwise unidentified presenter on the Top Gear show—on the basis of financial filing made by the Collins Autosport company. On 1 September 2010, the BBC was refused a court injunction preventing Collins from publishing an autobiography revealing himself to be the Stig. On 1 October 2010, it was announced that Collins would join Fifth Gear as a presenter. In 2012 Collins joined as co-presenter of Polish TVN's Automaniak. In February 2014, he was added to the 'Drivers Club' of the newly formed Formula E series, but did not compete in the inaugural 2014–15 season.

== Personal life ==
Collins was born in Bristol but spent the first ten years of his life in California, USA, where his father worked for a distribution company. Collins attended Blundell's School and after studying law at the University of Exeter, he spent around four years serving in the British Army Reserve, serving some of his time as a Special Forces driving instructor. His racing career started in 1994. He worked for Hornby as brand manager of the Scalextric model slot car division. Collins is also a pipe organist and plays at Cairns Road Baptist church Bristol.

== Racing ==
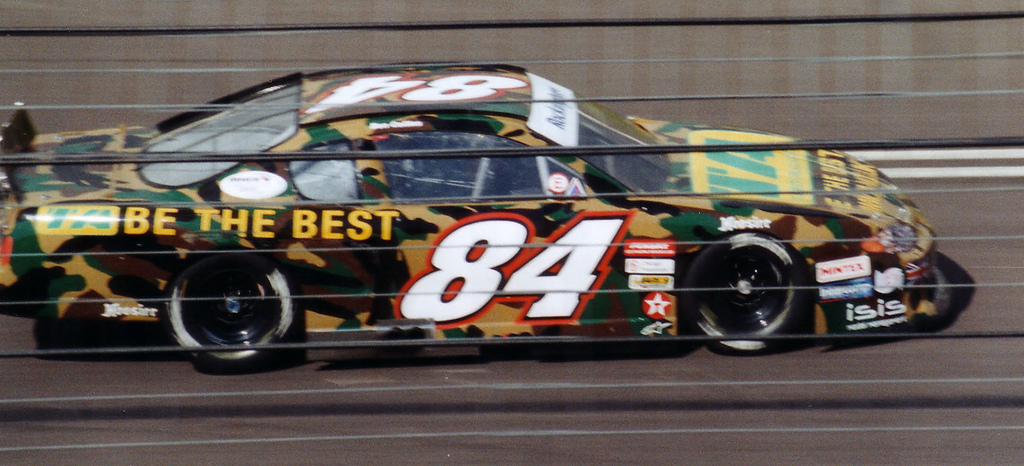
Ben Collins driving the No.84 car in the 2003 European SCSA

Collins has competed in motorsport since 1994. In 1995 he competed in Formula Vauxhall Junior, finishing third overall with two wins and eight podiums. He also competed in the Formula Opel Winter Series, placing second overall driving for Sir Jackie Stewart who commented in Autosport Magazine, "When you see the likes of Ben Collins in Formula One, remember you saw them here first". The following season, he competed briefly in Formula Vauxhall for Martin Donnelly, scoring a second-place finish in the opening round at Donington Park - Martin remarked that "Ben is an aggressive driver with phenomenal natural speed."

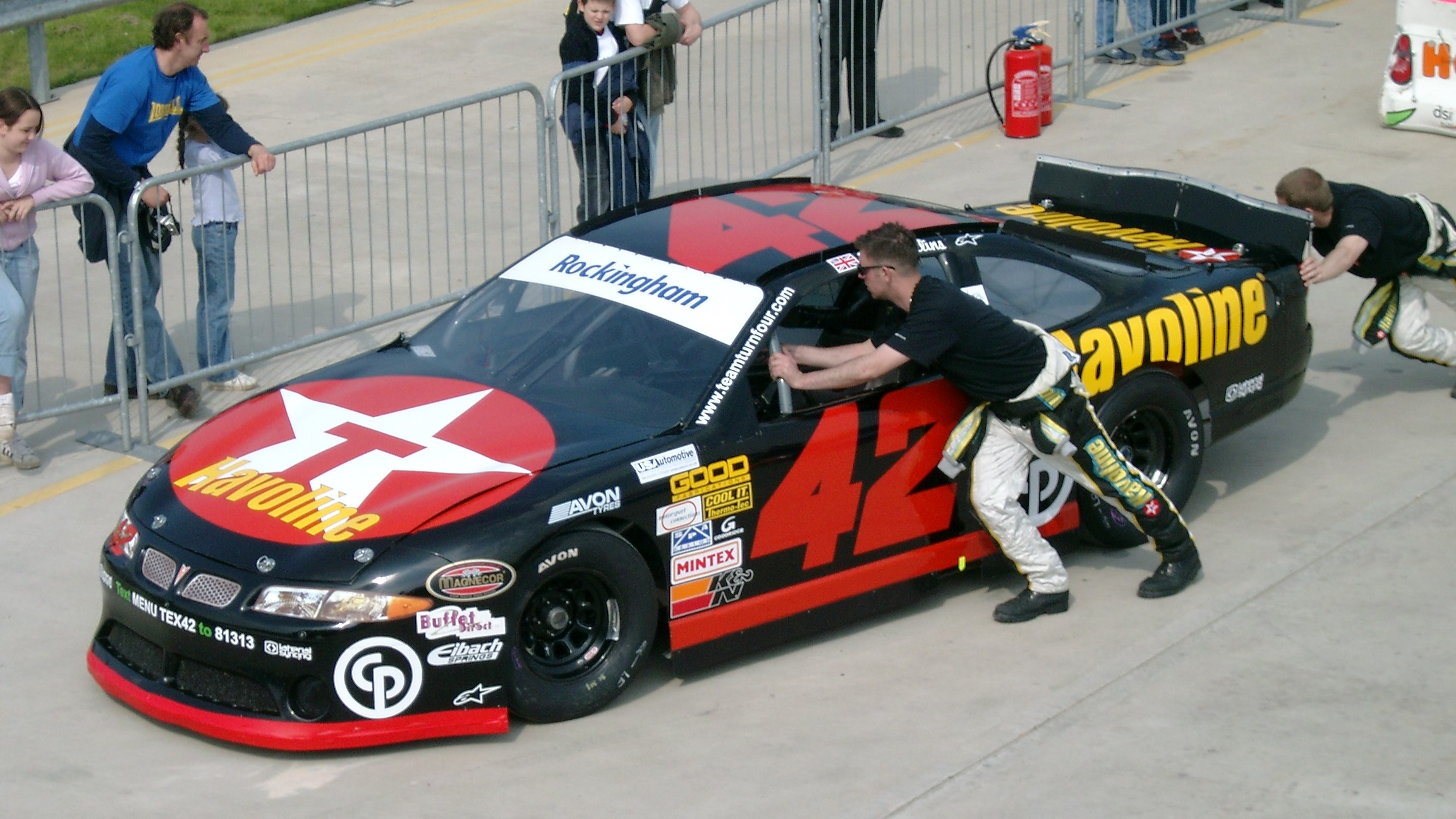
Collins's 2004 Days of Thunder car in the paddock area at Rockingham.

Collins moved onto the British Formula 3 Championship in 1996. In 1997, he finished eighth in the standings driving for Fortec Motorsport, and also finished eighth in the Macau Grand Prix. After another year in Formula Three in 1998, Collins raced in the American Indy Lights series in 1999, finishing thirteen in the standings. For 2000, he returned to British F3 to drive for Carlin Motorsport, once again finishing eighth. He also finished second in the 2000 Masters of Formula 3 race at Zandvoort. Collins has been a test driver for racing manufacturer Ascari during Ascari A10 development, and undertaken testing of Formula One cars.

In 2001, Collins raced in the FIA Sportscar Championship for Team Ascari, with Werner Lupberger, the pair winning at Donington Park and finishing joint sixth in the standings. The team also raced at the 2001 24 Hours of Le Mans. Collins also finished sixth at the 2002 12 Hours of Sebring for Ascari.

In 2003, Collins raced in the ASCAR European Oval racing series with RML, winning six races on his way to being crowned champion. He continued racing in the series in 2004.

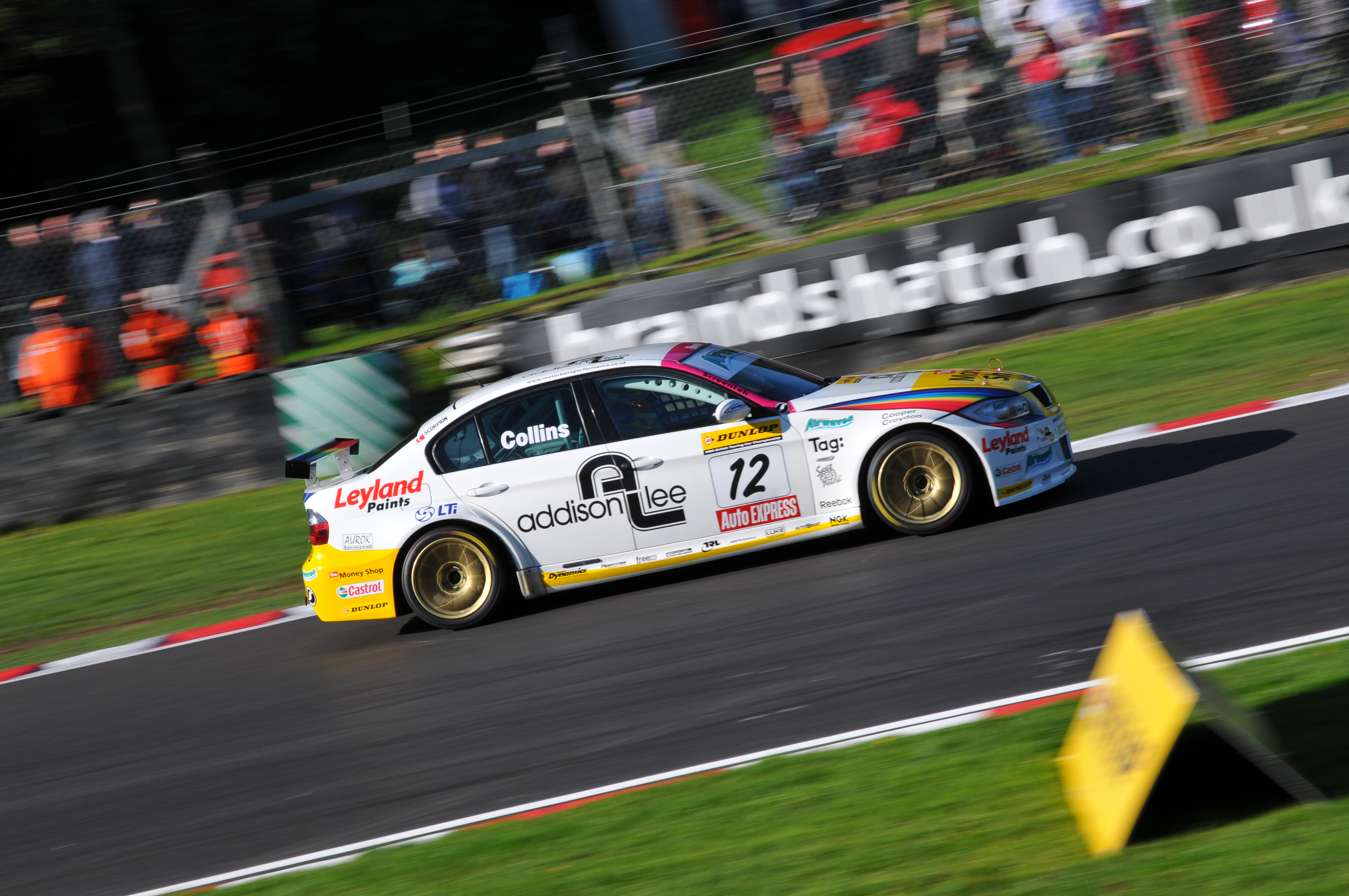
Collins driving the Airwaves Racing BMW 320si at Brands Hatch during the 2010 British Touring Car Championship season.

Collins returned to sportscars in 2005 to race in the British GT Championship and FIA GT Championship with Embassy Racing, placing third in the series.

In 2006, Collins rejoined Ascari, racing in the FIA GT3 European Championship.

In 2007, Collins tested a NASCAR Cup Series car at Lakeland Speedway with the Red Bull Racing Team.

In 2009, Collins was named as an endurance driver for Australian V8 Supercars team, Kelly Racing/Jack Daniel's Racing, partnering with Nathan Pretty.

In the 2010 Le Mans Series season, Collins was racing for RML AD Group. His first race for the team was the 2010 1000 km of Algarve, finishing fourth overall and winning the LMP2 class. He remained with the team for the next round, the 2010 1000 km of Hungaroring, where they finished fourth in both class and overall.

Collins competed in the final meeting of the 2010 Dunlop MSA British Touring Car Championship, driving a BMW for the Motorbase Performance team. He finished his first race in 14th and bettered that with a 12th in his second. However, he retired in the third and he never returned the following season.

In 2021, Collins once again found himself behind a racing wheel as he took part in the Britcar Praga Championship alongside ex-SAS and Who Dares Wins star Jay Morton and Angus Fender. The pair drove the 85 car, nicknamed Blade.

In 2022, Collins took part in the inaugural season of the Praga Cup.

== Collins Autosport ==
Collins is a regular writer for Autosport magazine testing the latest racing cars, has written for The Sunday Times, fronted Sky Sports's televised NASCAR coverage, along with appearances on the British car-focused television programmes Top Gear (BBC Two), Pulling Power (ITV1) and driven (Channel 4).

Collins worked as a precision-driver in the film National Treasure: Book of Secrets where he doubled for the actor Nicolas Cage and drove in some of the high-speed sequences in London. As a precision-driver in the 2008-film Quantum of Solace, Collins drove James Bond's Aston Martin DBS as a stunt double for Daniel Craig in the lead role. He has also worked as a stunt driver on Skyfall and Spectre.

Collins also holds a World Record for the maximum distance of driving a car on two wheels (a manoeuvre called "skiing").

Collins presented television programme Xtreme Teen Drivers, shown on BBC Three on 15 December 2007; as an advanced driving instructor within the programme, he was trying to teach a young boy racer to drive more safely.

Collins's company Ben Collins Auto-sport has provided its logistics and third-party liability insurance for prize-winner track day events promoted by Top Gear magazine.

== The Stig (Top Gear) ==
Collins has appeared on the BBC television programme Top Gear as himself, with his company providing drivers and driving services since December 2003. In Series 2 Episode 10, Collins appeared as one member of BBC Top Gear-team in the 24-hour Citroën 2CV racing event. The team finished thirteenth, out of thirty four cars, 24 laps behind the leaders, with Collins setting the fastest lap.

In 2004, Collins made an appearance during the fourth series of Top Gear, alongside parachutist Tim Carter. The stunt involved Carter and an aerial cameraman jumping out of a Cessna light aircraft then landing in the open-topped Mercedes car being driven at a speed by Collins. The open-top car was introduced as belonging to Collins and had earlier been used, driven by The Stig, during a wig test in Series 3 Episode 5.

In 2004, Collins featured in the second episode of series five, driving a Lancer Evo VII and then a Bowler Wildcat vehicle in a race against mountain boarding world champion Tom Kirkman

At the start of series six, Collins appeared with other British Touring Car Championship racing and stunt drivers for a Five-a-side football game using a fleet of Toyota Aygo cars. Collins played in a team captained by Top Gear presenter Richard Hammond. The other drivers were Paul Swift, Tim Harvey and Tom Chilton (blue team); playing against James May, Russ Swift, Matt Neal, Dan Eaves and Rob Huff (red team).

Collins could be seen driving the Honda Civic Type-R against Jeremy Clarkson in Episode 6 of Series 10.

The sixth episode of series seventeen of Top Gear featured a team of amputee soldiers training driving a Bowler Wildcat and being trained by Collins to take part in the Dakar Rally.

Collins also appeared in the Top Gear Special, '50 Years of Bond Cars', on the set of Skyfall. Collins, who worked as a stunt driver on the film was interviewed by Richard Hammond.

On a separate occasion, following an accident involving Richard Hammond in September 2006, the Health & Safety Executive report into the event recorded that Collins had "worked closely with Top Gear as a high-performance driver and consultant" and had prepared a briefing for Richard Hammond preceding the event.

=== The Stig ===
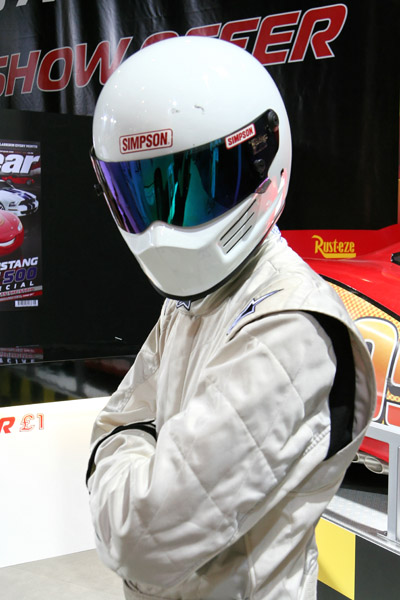
The Stig

On 19 January 2009, British newspaper The Daily Telegraph ran a story claiming that they had "outed" Collins as being one of the people behind the white-suit incarnation of The Stig, at the same time noting that "Collins, from Bristol, has always denied being the Stig".

The Times, in a follow-up article, stated that the "identity of the white-suited Stig ... has been an open secret within the motoring world for some years, with newspapers refraining from publishing his name, to uphold the spirit of the programme" which concluded that "a newspaper broke with the convention to out Mr Collins, 33, after following up a story in a Bristol newspaper". Similar allegations were repeated by The Sunday Times during August 2010.

Two Bristol-based local newspapers had published articles a week before The Times in January 2009, on the basis of information leaked from a local art gallery. Collins had previously commissioned a Clifton-based business in September 2008, to produce a limited-edition run of poster prints. Collins had initially portrayed himself as a BBC marketing executive and only confirmed a more detailed connection to the Top Gear show after the signing of confidentiality agreements by the business owners. The signed poster image showed a salt flat scene, with The Stig positioned standing on it.

However, at the time Top Gear presenter James May claimed that the Stig's identity had not been outed. There had been speculation that there may have been more than one person who plays the Stig.

=== Autobiography publication ===
During August to September 2010, the BBC started legal proceedings against Harper Collins, with the BBC attempting to obtain a High Court injunction to prevent the publishing of a book entitled The Man in The White Suit, apparently authored by Collins. The injunction was quashed by the High Court, allowing the possibility of the book being published on its intended release date of 16 September 2010 in the United Kingdom and 1 October 2010 in Australia.

In an exclusive interview with WitneyTV recorded on 3 September 2010 and broadcast on 7 September 2010, Top Gear-presenter Jeremy Clarkson confirmed that Collins had worked as The Stig, and that Collins was "history as far as we're concerned, he's sacked". On 7/8 September 2010, The Guardian and other papers re-reported Clarkson's assertions in the interview that Collins had been fired from his role on the television show.

In the fifteenth series Christmas special, Top Gear presenters referred to the Stig as "The Splitter" and publicly ridiculed the Stig, using the picture of the Stig for drive-by shooting targets.

During Collins's appearance with the military amputees broadcast in July 2011, Collins was introduced and acknowledged by Top Gear-presenter Richard Hammond as "ex-Stig ... Ben Collins". Though Hammond still referred to Collins as a "romantic novelist", he said that "to be honest, [he was] quite glad to see 'the old Splitter' back, and [he does] know how much giving these guys a hand means to him. So this is all right."

In his appearance in the Top Gear Special, '50 Years of Bond Cars', Collins was wearing a T-shirt on which was printed the words, "I AM THE STIG." Richard Hammond, (who interviewed Collins) reacted, saying to him, "Nice T-shirt by the way." Collins admitted that he needs to "update that a bit", pointing to the word "AM", to which Hammond exclaimed, "Was." After hearing about some of what Collins had been doing for the film, Hammond remarked, "You should write a book."

=== Fifth Gear ===
Collins joined the presenting staff of Channel 5's Fifth Gear in Series 18, participating in racing challenges on several occasions. He did not return to the cast for Series 19.

== Other work ==
Following his departure from Top Gear, Collins has subsequently appeared in the "Clarkson, Hammond & May Live" touring show, where he served as a racing driver in a pre-recorded segment Introducing him, Clarkson joked Collins was "living rough", in a racing track paddock, as Collins was shown to be sleeping on cardboard with a shopping trolley with books and Daniel Craig face cuttouts for his possessions. Collins's role was identical to his previous one as the Stig, except wearing an open face helmet and he was referred to as "The Ben Collins" by Clarkson. He has written a second book, How To Drive: The Ultimate Guide, from the Man Who Was The Stig, published in 2014.

Collins served as a consultant during the development of Project CARS and Project CARS 2.

In 2007, Collins started a career as a stunt driver in National Treasure: Book of Secrets. This followed by multiple films for the James Bond franchise and other blockbusters including The Dark Knight Rises, Solo: A Star Wars Story, Jack Ryan, and Mission Impossible. In Ford v Ferrari (a.k.a. Le Mans ’66) he played the role of New Zealand racing driver Denny Hulme and was a stunt driver. Collins played Stirling Moss in the 2023 film Ferrari.

Since 2022, Collins currently serves as co-host of the DriveTribe YouTube channel, alongside main hosts Richard Hammond and his daughter, Izzy Hammond.

Collins also runs two YouTube channels of his own, Ben Collins Drives and Ben Collins Gaming, with the former being an automotive channel, and the latter being a channel focused on sim racing.

== Racing career ==
=== Complete American open-wheel racing results ===
(key)

==== Indy Lights ====
Year	Team	1	2	3	4	5	6	7	8	9	10	11	12	Rank	Points	Ref
1999	Johansson Motorsports	MIA; 10	LBH; 11	NAZ; 5	MIL; 18	POR; 8	CLE; 6	TOR; 16	MIS; 18	DET; 18	CHI; 7	LAG; 15	FON; 2	**13th**	**50**	

=== 24 Hours of Le Mans results ===
Year	Team	Co-drivers	Car	Class	Laps	Pos.	Class Pos.
2001	(United Kingdom) Team Ascari	(South Africa) Werner Lupberger (Finland) Harri Toivonen	Ascari A410-Judd	LMP900	134	DNF	DNF
2002	(United Kingdom) Team Ascari	(South Africa) Werner Lupberger (United States) T. J. Bell	Ascari KZR-1-Judd	LMP1	17	DNF	DNF
2011	(United Kingdom) RML	(United Kingdom) Mike Newton (Brazil) Thomas Erdos	HPD ARX-01d	LMP2	314	12th	4th
2014	(United States) Krohn Racing	(United States) Tracy Krohn (Sweden) Niclas Jönsson	Ferrari 458 Italia GT2	GTE; Am	325	30th	10th

=== 2CV 24 Hour Race results ===
Year	Team	Co-Drivers	Car	Car No.	Laps	Pos.	Ref
2003	(United Kingdom) BBC Top Gear	(United Kingdom) Simon Butler (United Kingdom) Fasta Rasta (United Kingdom) Richard Hammond	Citroën 2CV	24		14th	

=== Complete British GT Championship results ===
(key) (Races in bold indicate pole position in class) (Races in italics indicate fastest lap in class)

Year	Team	Car	Class	1	2	3	4	5	6	7	8	9	10	11	12	13	Pos.	Points
2005	Embassy Racing	Porsche 911 GT3-RSR	GT2	DON; 1; 8	MAG; 1 DNS	KNO; 1; 1	KNO; 2; 4	THR; 1; 5	THR; 2; 13	CAS; 1; 3	CAS; 2; 4	SIL; 1; 1	MON; 1; 3	MON; 2; 3	SIL; 1; 3	SIL; 2; 2	2nd	70
2023	Raceway Motorsport	Ginetta G56 GT4	GT4	OUL; 1	OUL; 2	SIL; 1	DON; 1	SNE; 1	SNE; 2	ALG; 1	BRH; 1	DON; 1 Ret					NC	0

=== Complete FIA GT Championship results ===
(key) (Races in bold indicate pole position) (Races in italics indicate fastest lap)

Year	Team	Car	Class	1	2	3	4	5	6	7	8	9	10	11	Pos.	Points
2005	Embassy Racing	Porsche 911 GT3-RSR	GT2	MNZ	MAG; DNS	SIL; 2	IMO	BRN	SPA; 5	OSC	IST	ZHU	DUB	BHR	12th	17.5

=== Complete Le Mans Series results ===
(key) (Races in bold indicate pole position; races in italics indicate fastest lap)

Year	Entrant	Class	Car	Engine	1	2	3	4	5	Pos.	Points
2006	ProTran Competition	LMP1	ProTran RS06/H	Judd GV5 S2 5.0L V10	IST	SPA	NÜR; 8	DON	JAR	30th	1
2010	RML	LMP2	Lola B08/80	HPD AL7.R 3.4 L V8	LEC	SPA	ALG; 1	HUN; 4	SIL; 5	12th	26
2011	RML	LMP2	HPD ARX-01d	HPD HR28TT 2.8 L Turbo V6	LEC; 7	SPA; DNS	IMO; 11	SIL; 4	EST	15th	17

=== Britcar 24 Hour results ===
Year	Team	Co-Drivers	Car	Car No.	Class	Laps	Pos.	Class Pos.	Ref
2007	(United Kingdom) Team Top Gear	(United Kingdom) Jeremy Clarkson (United Kingdom) Richard Hammond (United Kingdom) James May	BMW 330d	78	4	396	39th	**3rd**	

=== Complete V8 Supercar Championship results ===
Year	Team	Car	1	2	3	4	5	6	7	8	9	10	11	12	13	14	15	16	17	18	19	20	21	22	23	24	25	26	27	Final Pos	Points
2009	Kelly Racing	Holden Commodore VE	ADE; R1	ADE; R2	HAM; R3	HAM; R4	WIN; R5	WIN; R6	SYM; R7	SYM; R8	HDV; R9	HDV; R10	TOW; R11	TOW; R12	SAN; R13	SAN; R14	QLD; R15	QLD; R16	PHI; Q 13	PHI; R17; 18	BAT; R18; 20	SUR; R19	SUR; R20	PHI; R21	PHI; R22	PTH; R23	PTH; R22	SYD; R23	SYD; R24	50th	180

=== Complete British Touring Car Championship results ===
(key) (Races in bold indicate pole position – 1 point awarded in first race) (Races in italics indicate fastest lap – 1 point awarded all races) (* signifies that driver lead race for at least one lap – 1 point given all races)

Year	Team	Car	1	2	3	4	5	6	7	8	9	10	11	12	13	14	15	16	17	18	19	20	21	22	23	24	25	26	27	28	29	30	Pos	Pts
2010	Airwaves BMW	BMW 320si	THR; 1	THR; 2	THR; 3	ROC; 1	ROC; 2	ROC; 3	BRH; 1	BRH; 2	BRH; 3	OUL; 1	OUL; 2	OUL; 3	CRO; 1	CRO; 2	CRO; 3	SNE; 1	SNE; 2	SNE; 3	SIL; 1	SIL; 2	SIL; 3	KNO; 1	KNO; 2	KNO; 3	DON; 1	DON; 2	DON; 3	BRH; 1; 14	BRH; 2; 12	BRH; 3 Ret	NC	0

=== Complete FIA World Endurance Championship results ===
(key) (Races in bold indicate pole position; races in italics indicate fastest lap)

Year	Entrant	Class	Car	Engine	1	2	3	4	5	6	7	8	Rank	Points
2014	Ram Racing	LMGTE Am	Ferrari 458 Italia GT2	Ferrari 4.5 L V8	SIL; 5	SPA	LMS	COA	FUJ	SHA	BHR	SÃO	NC†	0†

^{†} Collins was not given a final championship position.
