= Ski (driving stunt) =

Driving stunt

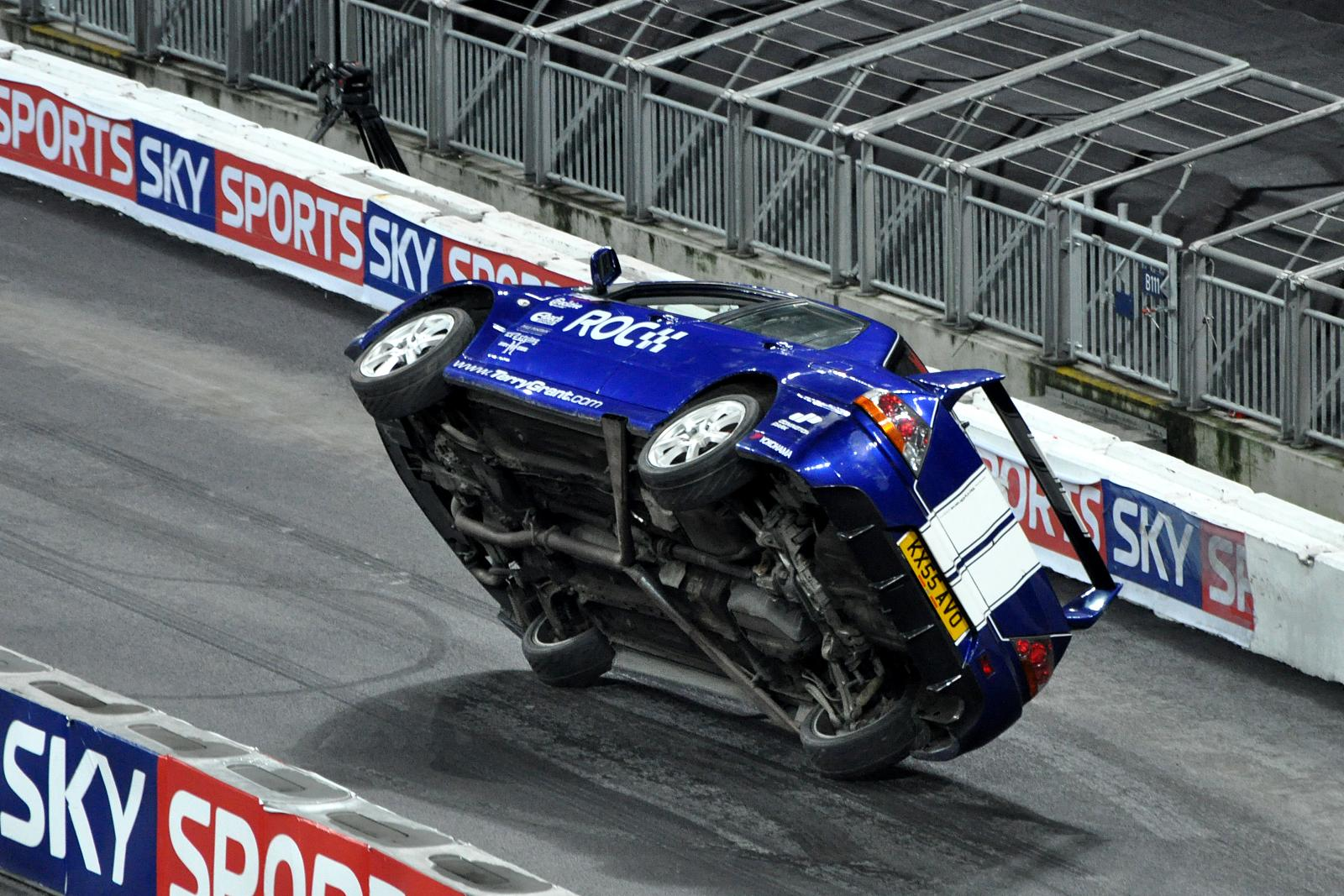
A Mitsubishi Lancer Evolution doing a ski stunt

Skiing or side wheelieing is an automotive driving stunt where the car is driven while balanced only on two wheels, either the pair on the driver side or on the passenger side.

The stunt is generally performed by driving one pair of wheels up on a ramp to lift one side of the car. Alternately, the stunt can be done in a vehicle with a high center of gravity (such as a 4x4 or SUV) by turning sharply or at speed. This technique is more dangerous because there is a strong possibility of the vehicle tipping completely over. Another technique is to let some air out of the tires that will be on the ground, so that the car can tip more easily, as well as keep its balance better. Once up on two wheels, the car has to be balanced by steering (much as one would when riding a bicycle), which makes it necessary to drive more or less in a straight line. The vehicle used must also be fitted with a lockable differential (common on 4x4s). The stunt was perfected and first performed at the 1964 World Fair by Tonny Peterson of Copenhagen, Denmark.

== Famous uses ==
The stunt has been used in many movies and television series, including Knight Rider, The Dukes of Hazzard, Twins,, and Diamonds Are Forever. The British stunt driver Russ Swift performs this maneuver as part of his shows and has achieved it in a wide range of vehicles including trucks. His son Paul also uses it in his displays and once rolled a Ford Fiesta whilst attempting to drive around Cardiff's Millennium Stadium at the Wales Rally GB in 2005.

In the Knight Rider series, KITT had a function button on the dashboard called "Ski Mode" which, when pressed, would cause KITT to drive on two wheels.

The stunt was also used by the character Bumblebee in the 2007 Transformers film, in a scene just before the robot changes the exterior disguise from the 1976 Chevrolet Camaro to the 2009 Camaro. In the movie, Bumblebee's retro look is insulted by Mikaela Banes, and Bumblebee stops to eject her and Sam Witwicky from the car. Bumblebee then drives off and skis on two wheels past a 2009 Camaro that drives by and scans it. Bumblebee then returns moments later to Sam and Mikaela, surprising the two, as the newer version of the car.

It is also featured in the film Transporter 3 to ski between two semi trucks in an escape bid by the film's main characters.

The stunt is featured prominently in M.I.A.'s music video for Bad Girls.

It is also featured in the 1985 film D.A.R.Y.L., in which the title character performs it while escaping from the army.

== Gallery ==
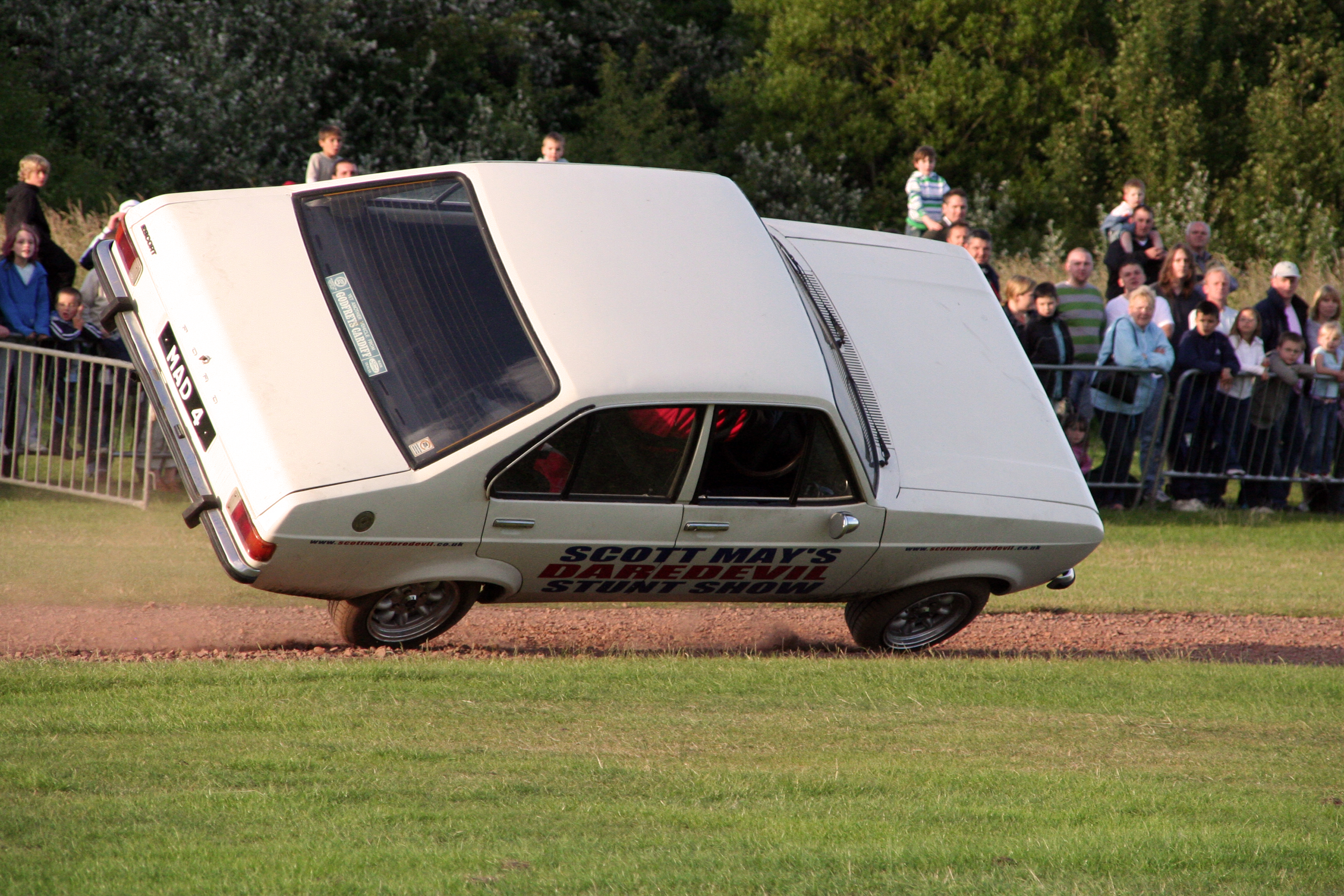
Two wheel driving at Scott May's Daredevil Stunt Show, Musselburgh, Edinburgh

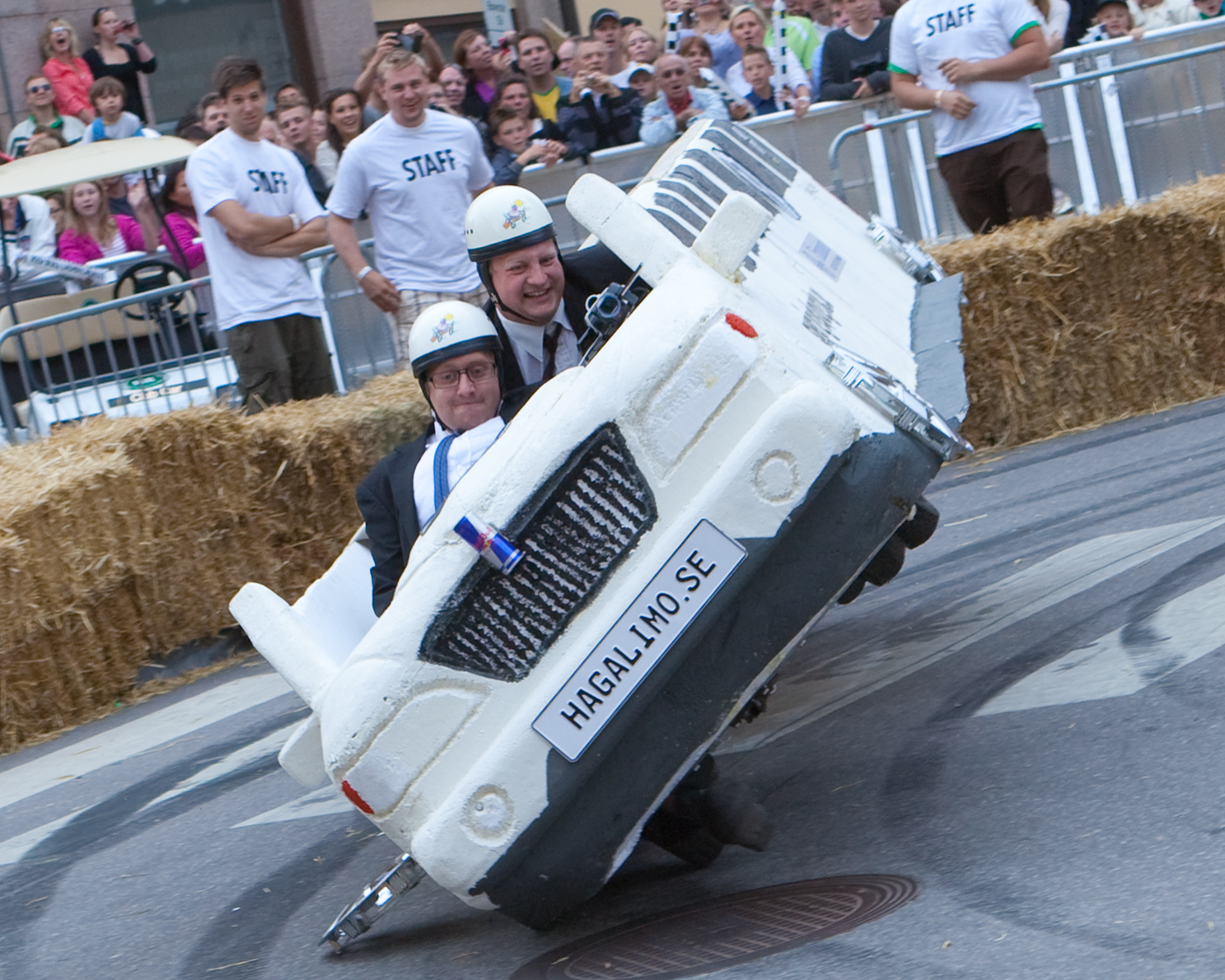
Red Bull soap box rally Stockholm Sweden, July 2011

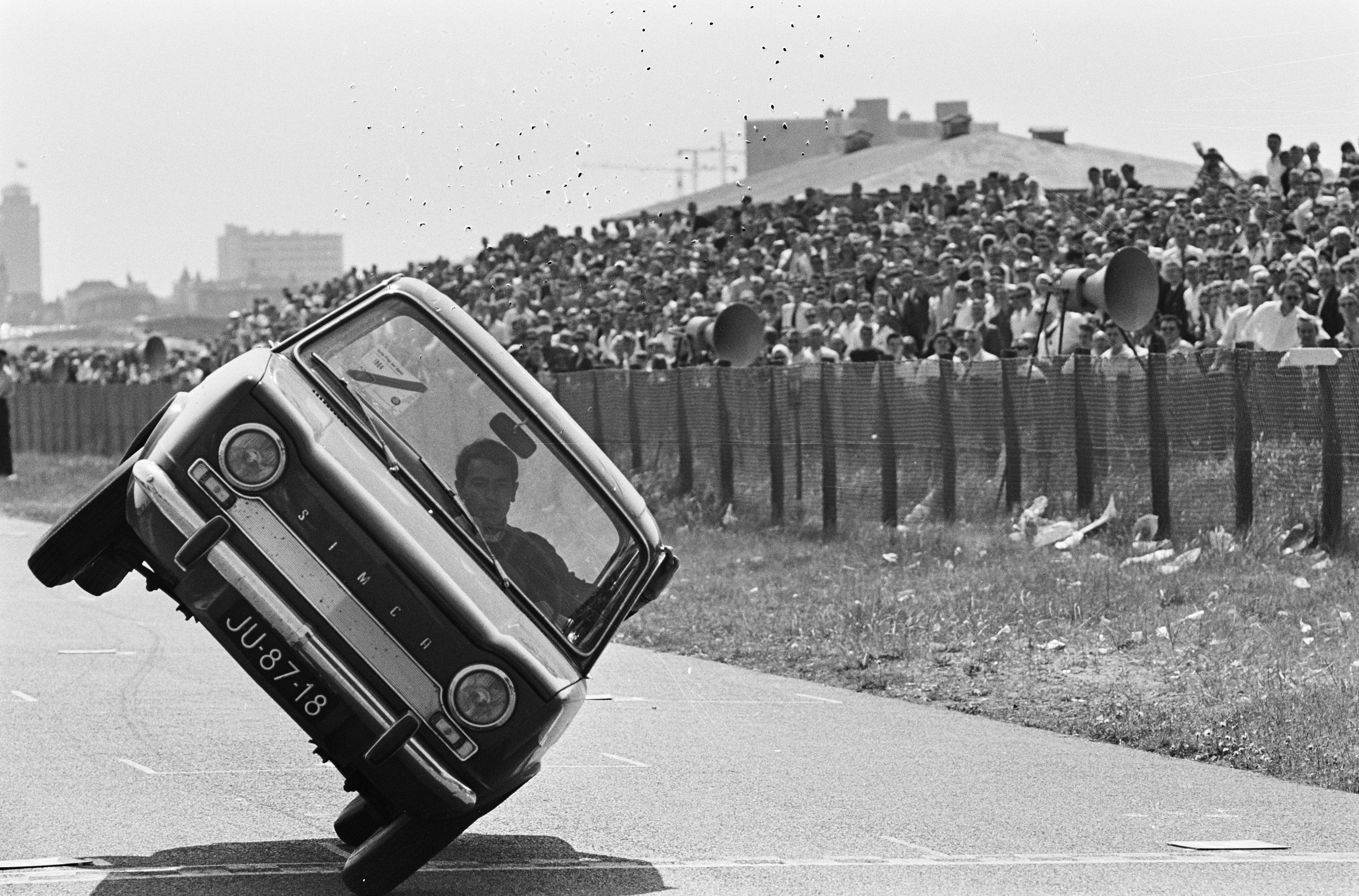
A stunt driver performing a ski stunt in a Simca in the Netherlands, 1964.

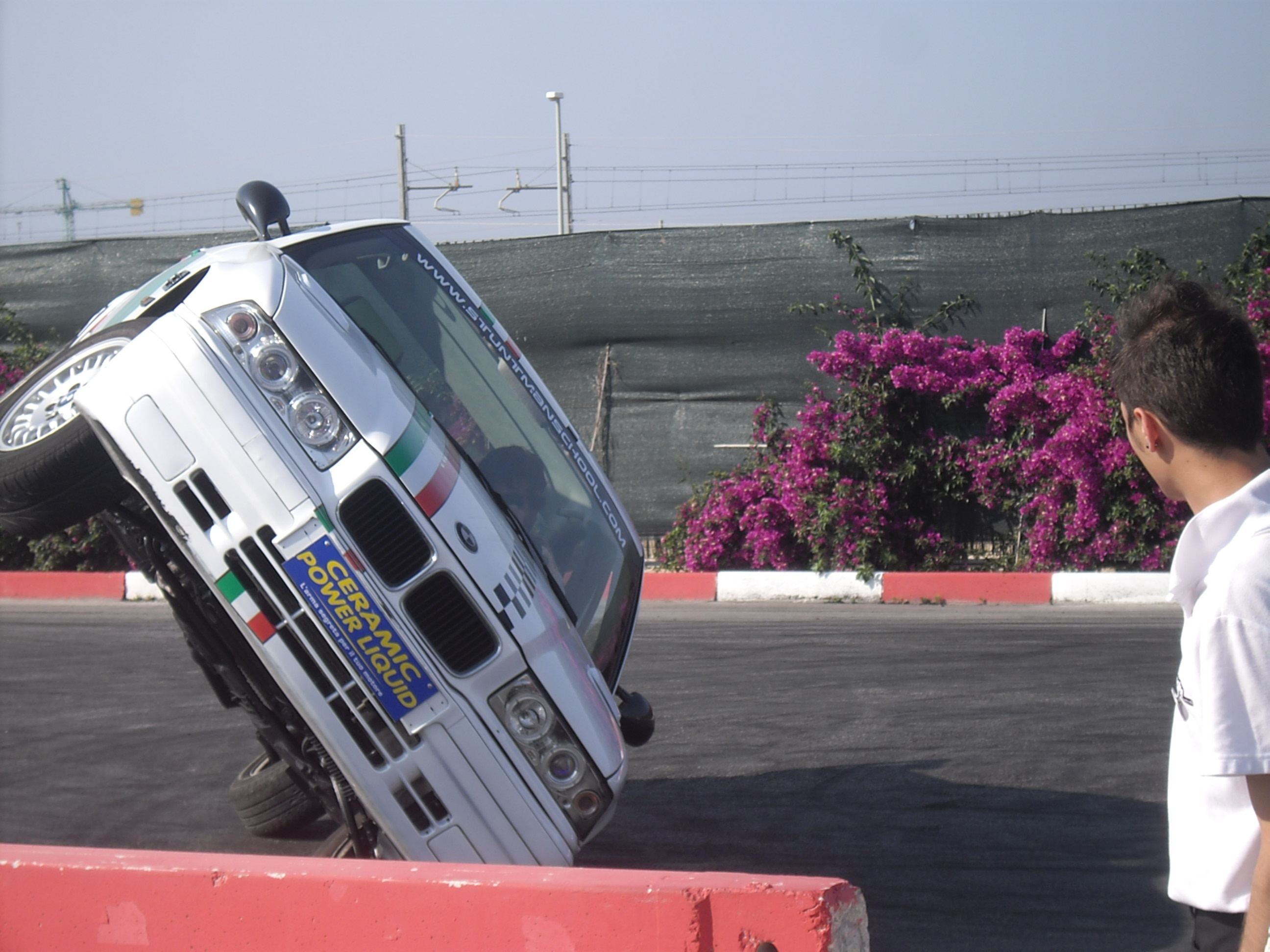
BMW E36 in competition, 2009

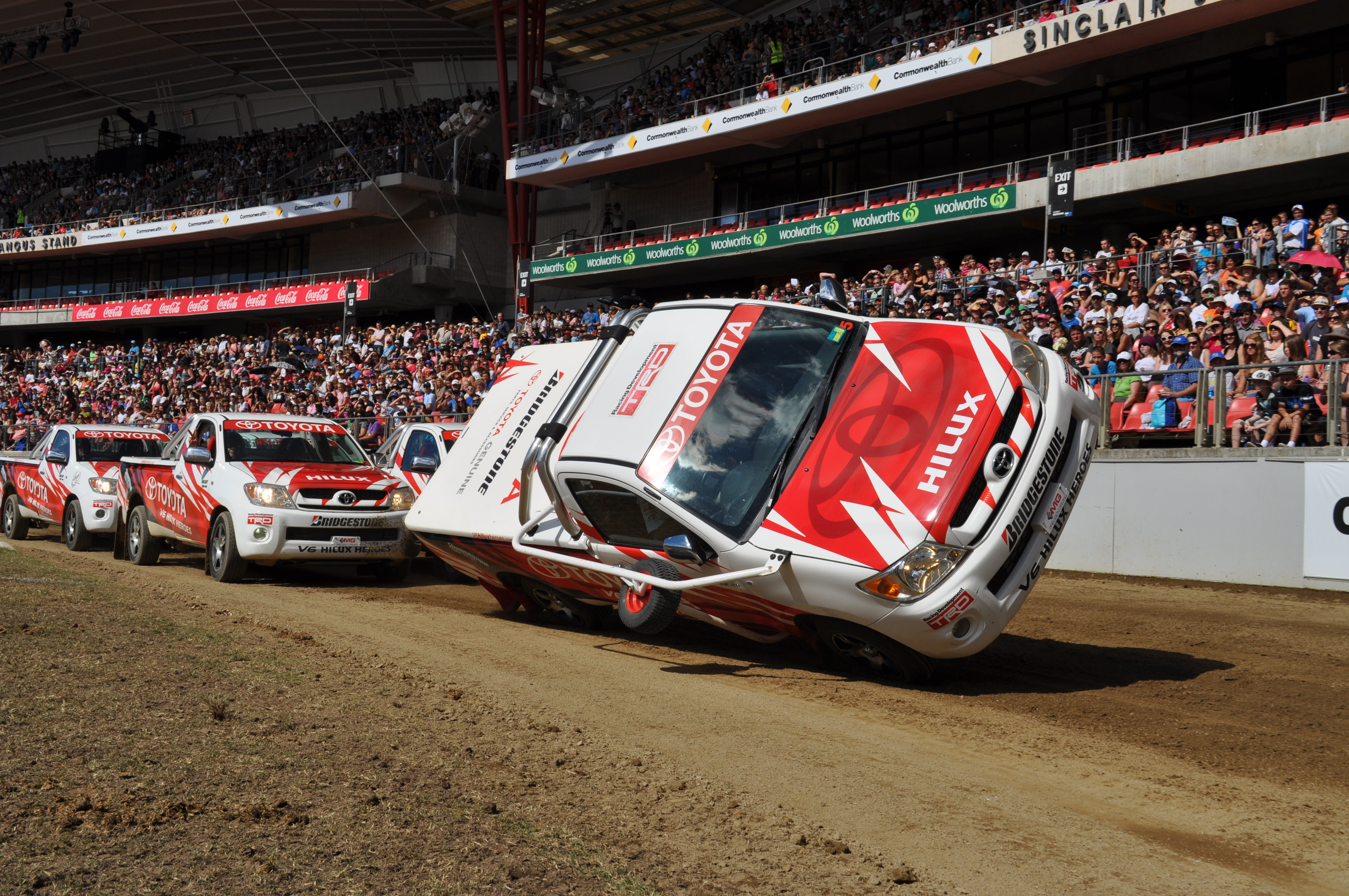
Toyota V6 HiLux Heroes at the Royal Easter Show, 2011

== See also ==
- Wheelie
- Sidewall Skiing
