= 2005 FIA GT Magny-Cours Supercar 500 =

Layout of the Circuit de Nevers Magny-Cours

The 2005 FIA GT Magny-Cours Supercar 500 was the second race for the 2005 FIA GT Championship season. It took place on 1 May 2005 at the Circuit de Nevers Magny-Cours. It was also the second round of the 2005 British GT Championship, counting for the GT2 class only.

== Official results ==
Class winners in bold. Cars failing to complete 70% of winner's distance marked as Not Classified (NC). Entries in italic scored points for the British GT Championship.

Pos	Class	No	Team	Drivers	Chassis	Tyre	Laps
Pos	Class	No	Team	Drivers	Engine	Tyre	Laps
1	**GT1**	**15**	**(Monaco) JMB Racing**	**(Italy) Andrea Bertolini (Austria) Karl Wendlinger**	**Maserati MC12 GT1**	P	**104**
1	**GT1**	**15**	**(Monaco) JMB Racing**	**(Italy) Andrea Bertolini (Austria) Karl Wendlinger**	**Maserati 6.0L V12**	P	**104**
2	GT1	9	(Germany) Vitaphone Racing Team	(Germany) Michael Bartels (Germany) Timo Scheider	Maserati MC12 GT1	P	104
2	GT1	9	(Germany) Vitaphone Racing Team	(Germany) Michael Bartels (Germany) Timo Scheider	Maserati 6.0L V12	P	104
3	GT1	10	(Germany) Vitaphone Racing Team	(Italy) Fabio Babini (Italy) Thomas Biagi	Maserati MC12 GT1	P	104
3	GT1	10	(Germany) Vitaphone Racing Team	(Italy) Fabio Babini (Italy) Thomas Biagi	Maserati 6.0L V12	P	104
4	GT1	6	(Belgium) GLPK-Carsport	(Belgium) Bert Longin (Belgium) Anthony Kumpen (Netherlands) Mike Hezemans	Chevrolet Corvette C5-R	MI	104
4	GT1	6	(Belgium) GLPK-Carsport	(Belgium) Bert Longin (Belgium) Anthony Kumpen (Netherlands) Mike Hezemans	Chevrolet LS7r 7.0L V8	MI	104
5	GT1	11	(France) Larbre Compétition	(Portugal) Pedro Lamy (Switzerland) Gabriele Gardel	Ferrari 550-GTS Maranello	MI	102
5	GT1	11	(France) Larbre Compétition	(Portugal) Pedro Lamy (Switzerland) Gabriele Gardel	Ferrari 5.9L V12	MI	102
6	GT1	12	(France) Larbre Compétition	(Switzerland) Lilian Bryner (Switzerland) Enzo Calderari (Switzerland) Steve Zacchia	Ferrari 550-GTS Maranello	MI	102
6	GT1	12	(France) Larbre Compétition	(Switzerland) Lilian Bryner (Switzerland) Enzo Calderari (Switzerland) Steve Zacchia	Ferrari 5.9L V12	MI	102
7	GT1	16	(Monaco) JMB Racing	(Austria) Philipp Peter (United Kingdom) Chris Buncombe (Russia) Roman Rusinov	Maserati MC12 GT1	P	101
7	GT1	16	(Monaco) JMB Racing	(Austria) Philipp Peter (United Kingdom) Chris Buncombe (Russia) Roman Rusinov	Maserati 6.0L V12	P	101
8	GT1	17	(Russia) Russian Age Racing	(France) Christophe Bouchut (Russia) Nikolai Fomenko (Russia) Alexey Vasilyev	Ferrari 550-GTS Maranello	MI	100
8	GT1	17	(Russia) Russian Age Racing	(France) Christophe Bouchut (Russia) Nikolai Fomenko (Russia) Alexey Vasilyev	Ferrari 5.9L V12	MI	100
9	**GT2**	**88**	**(United Kingdom) GruppeM Racing**	**(France) Emmanuel Collard (United Kingdom) Tim Sugden**	**Porsche 911 GT3-RSR**	MI	**100**
9	**GT2**	**88**	**(United Kingdom) GruppeM Racing**	**(France) Emmanuel Collard (United Kingdom) Tim Sugden**	**Porsche 3.6L Flat-6**	MI	**100**
10	GT2	66	(United Kingdom) GruppeM Racing	(Germany) Marc Lieb (Germany) Mike Rockenfeller	Porsche 911 GT3-RSR	MI	99
10	GT2	66	(United Kingdom) GruppeM Racing	(Germany) Marc Lieb (Germany) Mike Rockenfeller	Porsche 3.6L Flat-6	MI	99
11	GT1	2	(Italy) GPC Sport	(Switzerland) Jean-Denis Délétraz (Italy) Andrea Piccini	Ferrari 575-GTC Maranello	P	99
11	GT1	2	(Italy) GPC Sport	(Switzerland) Jean-Denis Délétraz (Italy) Andrea Piccini	Ferrari 6.0L V12	P	99
12	GT2	83	(United Kingdom) Scuderia Ecosse	(United Kingdom) Nathan Kinch (United Kingdom) Andrew Kirkaldy	Ferrari 360 Modena GTC	P	98
12	GT2	83	(United Kingdom) Scuderia Ecosse	(United Kingdom) Nathan Kinch (United Kingdom) Andrew Kirkaldy	Ferrari 3.6L V8	P	98
13	GT2	82	(United Kingdom) Scuderia Ecosse	(United Kingdom) Tim Mullen (Canada) Chris Niarchos	Ferrari 360 Modena GTC	P	98
13	GT2	82	(United Kingdom) Scuderia Ecosse	(United Kingdom) Tim Mullen (Canada) Chris Niarchos	Ferrari 3.6L V8	P	98
14	GT2	77	(United Kingdom) Team Eurotech	(United Kingdom) Mike Jordan (United Kingdom) Michael Caine	Porsche 911 GT3-RS	D	97
14	GT2	77	(United Kingdom) Team Eurotech	(United Kingdom) Mike Jordan (United Kingdom) Michael Caine	Porsche 3.6L Flat-6	D	97
15	GT2	80	(United Kingdom) Team LNT	(United Kingdom) Lawrence Tomlinson (United Kingdom) Jonny Kane	TVR Tuscan T400R	D	97
15	GT2	80	(United Kingdom) Team LNT	(United Kingdom) Lawrence Tomlinson (United Kingdom) Jonny Kane	TVR Speed Six 4.0L I6	D	97
16	GT1	8	(United Kingdom) Graham Nash Motorsport	(France) Philippe Almèras (France) Roland Bervillé (Italy) Enea Casoni	Saleen S7-R	P	96
16	GT1	8	(United Kingdom) Graham Nash Motorsport	(France) Philippe Almèras (France) Roland Bervillé (Italy) Enea Casoni	Ford 7.0L V8	P	96
17	GT1	4	(Germany) Konrad Motorsport	(Netherlands) Harald Becker (Austria) Franz Konrad	Saleen S7-R	P	96
17	GT1	4	(Germany) Konrad Motorsport	(Netherlands) Harald Becker (Austria) Franz Konrad	Ford 7.0L V8	P	96
18	GT2	81	(United Kingdom) Team LNT	(United Kingdom) Warren Hughes (United Kingdom) Patrick Pearce	TVR Tuscan T400R	D	96
18	GT2	81	(United Kingdom) Team LNT	(United Kingdom) Warren Hughes (United Kingdom) Patrick Pearce	TVR Speed Six 4.0L I6	D	96
19	GT2	76	(United Kingdom) Team Eurotech	(United Kingdom) David Jones (United Kingdom) Godfrey Jones	Porsche 911 GT3-RS	D	96
19	GT2	76	(United Kingdom) Team Eurotech	(United Kingdom) David Jones (United Kingdom) Godfrey Jones	Porsche 3.6L Flat-6	D	96
20	GT2	69	(Germany) Proton Competition	(Germany) Gerold Ried (Germany) Christian Ried	Porsche 911 GT3-RS	D	95
20	GT2	69	(Germany) Proton Competition	(Germany) Gerold Ried (Germany) Christian Ried	Porsche 3.6L Flat-6	D	95
21	GT2	56	(Czech Republic) Czech National Team	(Czech Republic) Jan Vonka (Italy) Mauro Casadei	Porsche 911 GT3-RS	D	92
21	GT2	56	(Czech Republic) Czech National Team	(Czech Republic) Jan Vonka (Italy) Mauro Casadei	Porsche 3.6L Flat-6	D	92
22	GT1	7	(United Kingdom) Graham Nash Motorsport	(Italy) Paolo Ruberti (Switzerland) Joël Camathias	Saleen S7-R	P	89
22	GT1	7	(United Kingdom) Graham Nash Motorsport	(Italy) Paolo Ruberti (Switzerland) Joël Camathias	Ford 7.0L V8	P	89
23	**G2**	**103**	**(United Kingdom) Emotional Engineering**	**(Republic of Ireland) Matt Griffin (United Kingdom) Ryan Hooker**	**Vauxhall Monaro**	D	**86**
23	**G2**	**103**	**(United Kingdom) Emotional Engineering**	**(Republic of Ireland) Matt Griffin (United Kingdom) Ryan Hooker**	**Vauxhall LS1 5.7L V8**	D	**86**
24	GT1	13	(Germany) Reiter Engineering	(Netherlands) Peter Kox (Germany) Norman Simon	Lamborghini Murcielago R-GT	P	83
24	GT1	13	(Germany) Reiter Engineering	(Netherlands) Peter Kox (Germany) Norman Simon	Lamborghini 6.0L V12	P	83
25 DNF	G2	101	(United Kingdom) Balfe Motorsport	(United Kingdom) Shaun Balfe (United Kingdom) Jamie Derbyshire	Mosler MT900R	D	66
25 DNF	G2	101	(United Kingdom) Balfe Motorsport	(United Kingdom) Shaun Balfe (United Kingdom) Jamie Derbyshire	Chevrolet 5.7L V8	D	66
26 DNF	G2	179	(United Kingdom) RJN Motorsport	(United Kingdom) Michael Bentwood (United Kingdom) Ally McKever (United Kingdom) Brice Wilson	Nissan 350Z	D	31
26 DNF	G2	179	(United Kingdom) RJN Motorsport	(United Kingdom) Michael Bentwood (United Kingdom) Ally McKever (United Kingdom) Brice Wilson	Nissan VQ35 3.5L V6	D	31
27 DNF	GT1	5	(Germany) Konrad Motorsport	(Austria) Robert Lechner (Germany) Uwe Alzen	Saleen S7-R	P	29
27 DNF	GT1	5	(Germany) Konrad Motorsport	(Austria) Robert Lechner (Germany) Uwe Alzen	Ford 7.0L V8	P	29
28 DNF	GT2	75	(United Kingdom) Ian Khan	(United Kingdom) Ian Khan (United Kingdom) Nigel Smith	Porsche 911 GT3-RS	D	15
28 DNF	GT2	75	(United Kingdom) Ian Khan	(United Kingdom) Ian Khan (United Kingdom) Nigel Smith	Porsche 3.6L Flat-6	D	15
29 DNF	GT1	20	(Poland) RAM Racing	(Poland) Max Stanco (Poland) Rafal Janus	Saleen S7-R	P	4
29 DNF	GT1	20	(Poland) RAM Racing	(Poland) Max Stanco (Poland) Rafal Janus	Ford 7.0L V8	P	4
30 DNF	GT1	14	(United Kingdom) Lister Storm Racing	(United Kingdom) Justin Keen (United States) Liz Halliday	Lister Storm GT	D	4
30 DNF	GT1	14	(United Kingdom) Lister Storm Racing	(United Kingdom) Justin Keen (United States) Liz Halliday	Jaguar 7.0L V12	D	4
DNS	GT2	55	(United Kingdom) Embassy Racing	(United Kingdom) Ben Collins (New Zealand) Neil Cunningham	Porsche 911 GT3-RSR	D	-
DNS	GT2	55	(United Kingdom) Embassy Racing	(United Kingdom) Ben Collins (New Zealand) Neil Cunningham	Porsche 3.6L Flat-6	D	-

== Statistics ==
- Pole Position - #17 Russian Age Racing - 1:36.580
- Fastest Lap - #15 JMB Racing - 1:38.826
- Average Speed - 151.72 km/h

FIA GT Championship
Previous race: 2005 FIA GT Monza Supercar 500	2005 season	Next race: 2005 FIA GT Tourist Trophy
