= 2005 FIA GT Tourist Trophy =

Motor race in England

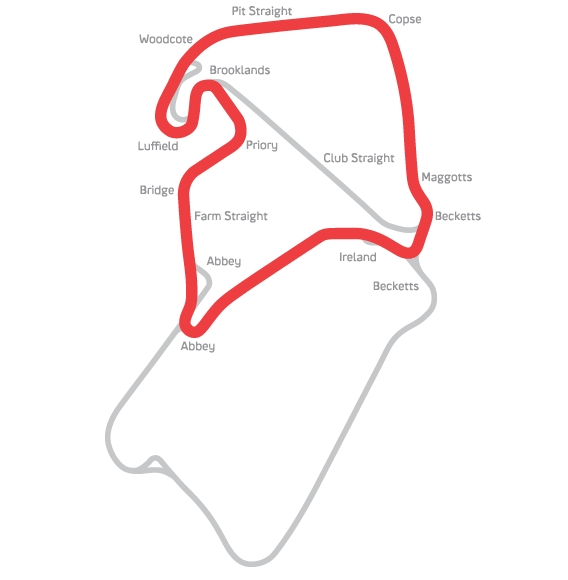
Map of the Silverstone Circuit-International version (1997-2009)

The 2005 FIA GT RAC Tourist Trophy was the third race for the 2005 FIA GT Championship season, and was the first time the RAC Tourist Trophy was held as a round of the FIA GT Championship. It took place on 15 May 2005 at the Silverstone Circuit.

The Aston Martin DBR9 made its debut in the FIA GT Championship here. However, since both cars were entered by the factory, they were ineligible for scoring points.

== Official results ==
Class winners in bold. Cars failing to complete 70% of winner's distance marked as Not Classified (NC).

Pos	Class	No	Team	Drivers	Chassis	Tyre	Laps
Pos	Class	No	Team	Drivers	Engine	Tyre	Laps
1	**GT1**	**29**	**(United Kingdom) Aston Martin Racing^{†}**	**(Netherlands) Peter Kox (Portugal) Pedro Lamy**	**Aston Martin DBR9**	MI	**134**
1	**GT1**	**29**	**(United Kingdom) Aston Martin Racing^{†}**	**(Netherlands) Peter Kox (Portugal) Pedro Lamy**	**Aston Martin 6.0L V12**	MI	**134**
2	GT1	28	(United Kingdom) Aston Martin Racing^{†}	(Australia) David Brabham (United Kingdom) Darren Turner	Aston Martin DBR9	MI	134
2	GT1	28	(United Kingdom) Aston Martin Racing^{†}	(Australia) David Brabham (United Kingdom) Darren Turner	Aston Martin 6.0L V12	MI	134
3	GT1	10	(Germany) Vitaphone Racing Team	(Italy) Fabio Babini (Italy) Thomas Biagi	Maserati MC12 GT1	P	134
3	GT1	10	(Germany) Vitaphone Racing Team	(Italy) Fabio Babini (Italy) Thomas Biagi	Maserati 6.0L V12	P	134
4	GT1	15	(Monaco) JMB Racing	(Italy) Andrea Bertolini (Austria) Karl Wendlinger	Maserati MC12 GT1	P	133
4	GT1	15	(Monaco) JMB Racing	(Italy) Andrea Bertolini (Austria) Karl Wendlinger	Maserati 6.0L V12	P	133
5	GT1	9	(Germany) Vitaphone Racing Team	(Germany) Michael Bartels (Germany) Timo Scheider	Maserati MC12 GT1	P	133
5	GT1	9	(Germany) Vitaphone Racing Team	(Germany) Michael Bartels (Germany) Timo Scheider	Maserati 6.0L V12	P	133
6	GT1	11	(France) Larbre Compétition	(Switzerland) Gabriele Gardel (Italy) Fabrizio Gollin	Ferrari 550-GTS Maranello	MI	133
6	GT1	11	(France) Larbre Compétition	(Switzerland) Gabriele Gardel (Italy) Fabrizio Gollin	Ferrari 5.9L V12	MI	133
7	GT1	2	(Italy) GPC Sport	(Switzerland) Jean-Denis Délétraz (Italy) Andrea Piccini	Ferrari 575-GTC Maranello	P	132
7	GT1	2	(Italy) GPC Sport	(Switzerland) Jean-Denis Délétraz (Italy) Andrea Piccini	Ferrari 6.0L V12	P	132
8	GT1	16	(Monaco) JMB Racing	(Austria) Philipp Peter (United Kingdom) Chris Buncombe (Russia) Roman Rusinov	Maserati MC12 GT1	P	132
8	GT1	16	(Monaco) JMB Racing	(Austria) Philipp Peter (United Kingdom) Chris Buncombe (Russia) Roman Rusinov	Maserati 6.0L V12	P	132
9	**GT2**	**66**	**(United Kingdom) GruppeM Racing**	**(Germany) Marc Lieb (Germany) Mike Rockenfeller**	**Porsche 911 GT3-RSR**	MI	**129**
9	**GT2**	**66**	**(United Kingdom) GruppeM Racing**	**(Germany) Marc Lieb (Germany) Mike Rockenfeller**	**Porsche 3.6L Flat-6**	MI	**129**
10	GT1	8	(United Kingdom) Graham Nash Motorsport	(Italy) Luca Pirri-Ardizzone (Italy) Marco Panzavuota (United Kingdom) Ryan Hooker	Saleen S7-R	P	127
10	GT1	8	(United Kingdom) Graham Nash Motorsport	(Italy) Luca Pirri-Ardizzone (Italy) Marco Panzavuota (United Kingdom) Ryan Hooker	Ford 7.0L V8	P	127
11	**G2**	**101**	**(United Kingdom) Balfe Motorsport**	**(United Kingdom) Shaun Balfe (United Kingdom) Jamie Derbyshire**	**Mosler MT900R**	D	**126**
11	**G2**	**101**	**(United Kingdom) Balfe Motorsport**	**(United Kingdom) Shaun Balfe (United Kingdom) Jamie Derbyshire**	**Chevrolet LS1 5.7L V8**	D	**126**
12	GT1	17	(Russia) Russian Age Racing	(France) Christophe Bouchut (Russia) Nikolai Fomenko (Russia) Alexey Vasilyev	Ferrari 550-GTS Maranello	MI	126
12	GT1	17	(Russia) Russian Age Racing	(France) Christophe Bouchut (Russia) Nikolai Fomenko (Russia) Alexey Vasilyev	Ferrari 5.9L V12	MI	126
13	GT2	55	(United Kingdom) Embassy Racing	(United Kingdom) Ben Collins (New Zealand) Neil Cunningham	Porsche 911 GT3-RSR	D	125
13	GT2	55	(United Kingdom) Embassy Racing	(United Kingdom) Ben Collins (New Zealand) Neil Cunningham	Porsche 3.6L Flat-6	D	125
14	GT2	80	(United Kingdom) Team LNT	(United Kingdom) Lawrence Tomlinson (United Kingdom) Jonny Kane	TVR Tuscan T400R	D	124
14	GT2	80	(United Kingdom) Team LNT	(United Kingdom) Lawrence Tomlinson (United Kingdom) Jonny Kane	TVR Speed Six 4.0L I6	D	124
15	GT1	7	(United Kingdom) Graham Nash Motorsport	(Italy) Paolo Ruberti (Switzerland) Joël Camathias	Saleen S7-R	P	124
15	GT1	7	(United Kingdom) Graham Nash Motorsport	(Italy) Paolo Ruberti (Switzerland) Joël Camathias	Ford 7.0L V8	P	124
16	G2	102	(United Kingdom) Eclipse Motorsport	(United Kingdom) Phil Keen (United Kingdom) Nigel Taylor	Mosler MT900R	D	122
16	G2	102	(United Kingdom) Eclipse Motorsport	(United Kingdom) Phil Keen (United Kingdom) Nigel Taylor	Chevrolet LS1 5.7L V8	D	122
17	GT2	86	(Italy) GPC Sport	(Italy) Gabrio Rosa (Italy) Luca Drudi	Ferrari 360 Modena GTC	P	122
17	GT2	86	(Italy) GPC Sport	(Italy) Gabrio Rosa (Italy) Luca Drudi	Ferrari 3.6L V8	P	122
18	GT2	69	(Germany) Proton Competition	(Germany) Christian Ried (Germany) Gerold Ried	Porsche 911 GT3-RSR	D	121
18	GT2	69	(Germany) Proton Competition	(Germany) Christian Ried (Germany) Gerold Ried	Porsche 3.6L Flat-6	D	121
19	GT2	88	(United Kingdom) GruppeM Racing	(France) Emmanuel Collard (United Kingdom) Tim Sugden	Porsche 911 GT3-RSR	MI	121
19	GT2	88	(United Kingdom) GruppeM Racing	(France) Emmanuel Collard (United Kingdom) Tim Sugden	Porsche 3.6L Flat-6	MI	121
20	GT2	84	(United Kingdom) Sebah Automotive, Ltd.	(Denmark) Lars-Erik Nielsen (Germany) Pierre Ehret	Porsche 911 GT3-RSR	D	120
20	GT2	84	(United Kingdom) Sebah Automotive, Ltd.	(Denmark) Lars-Erik Nielsen (Germany) Pierre Ehret	Porsche 3.6L Flat-6	D	120
21	GT2	85	(United Kingdom) Cirtek Motorsport	(Sweden) Stefan Eriksson (United Kingdom) Joe Macari	Ferrari 360 Modena GTC	D	119
21	GT2	85	(United Kingdom) Cirtek Motorsport	(Sweden) Stefan Eriksson (United Kingdom) Joe Macari	Ferrari 3.6L V8	D	119
22	GT2	56	(Czech Republic) Czech National Team	(Czech Republic) Jan Vonka (Italy) Mauro Casadei	Porsche 911 GT3-RS	D	118
22	GT2	56	(Czech Republic) Czech National Team	(Czech Republic) Jan Vonka (Italy) Mauro Casadei	Porsche 3.6L Flat-6	D	118
23	G2	104	(United Kingdom) Cadena GTC	(United Kingdom) Barrie Whight (United Kingdom) Paul Whight (United Kingdom) Gavan Kershaw	Mosler MT900R	D	94
23	G2	104	(United Kingdom) Cadena GTC	(United Kingdom) Barrie Whight (United Kingdom) Paul Whight (United Kingdom) Gavan Kershaw	Chevrolet LS1 5.7L V8	D	94
24 DNF	GT1	6	(Belgium) GLPK-Carsport	(Belgium) Bert Longin (Belgium) Anthony Kumpen (Netherlands) Mike Hezemans	Chevrolet Corvette C5-R	MI	64
24 DNF	GT1	6	(Belgium) GLPK-Carsport	(Belgium) Bert Longin (Belgium) Anthony Kumpen (Netherlands) Mike Hezemans	Chevrolet LS7r 7.0L V8	MI	64
25 NC	GT1	14	(United Kingdom) Lister Storm Racing	(United Kingdom) Justin Keen (United States) Liz Halliday	Lister Storm GT	D	57
25 NC	GT1	14	(United Kingdom) Lister Storm Racing	(United Kingdom) Justin Keen (United States) Liz Halliday	Jaguar 7.0L V12	D	57
26 DNF	GT1	3	(Italy) GPC Sport	(Brazil) Jaime Melo (France) Jean-Philippe Belloc	Ferrari 575-GTC Maranello	P	53
26 DNF	GT1	3	(Italy) GPC Sport	(Brazil) Jaime Melo (France) Jean-Philippe Belloc	Ferrari 6.0L V12	P	53

† – These entries are considered factory teams and thus do not score points for the championship.

== Statistics ==
- Pole Position – #28 Aston Martin Racing – 1:15.792
- Fastest Lap – #28 Aston Martin Racing – 1:17.490
- Average Speed – 161.28 km/h

FIA GT Championship
Previous race: 2005 FIA GT Magny-Cours Supercar 500	2005 season	Next race: 2005 FIA GT Imola Supercar 500
