= Russ Swift =

British driver (born 1951)

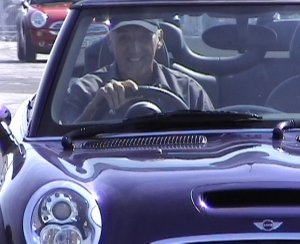
- Swift in 2005.
- Born: Paul Russell Swift; 24 March 1951 (age 75); Darlington, County Durham, England
- Occupation: Precision driver
- Years active: 1980–present
- Website: www.russswift.co.uk

Paul Russell "Russ" Swift (born 24 March 1951) is a British driver who is known for performing stunts and for precision driving.

== Career ==
Starting out as a rally co-driver, and later moving into Autotesting, Russ Swift built his career on a sturdy motorsport foundation. After being asked to demonstrate his driving skills locally, Russ displayed precision driving skills nationwide.

Swift's driving skills were memorably put to the test in 1987, when he performed stunts in a crowded parking lot in an Austin Montego for a television advertisement. The close-ups were done by an actor, but Swift (uncredited) was responsible for the driving. It was during the filming of the advertisement that Russ came up with the Parallel Park manœuvre, which has remained his "trademark" to this day. Russ previously held the world record for this manœuvre, parking in a space just 33 cm longer than the car. He has since been beaten by Peter Bell, who did it in a space 27 cm longer than the car. The Montego "Car Park" commercial was featured at the Cannes Film Festival and in an American review it was deemed the world's most imaginative car commercial.

Swift is the leader of the Russ Swift Mini Display Team, who perform driving displays for motor shows, commercials, vehicle launches, and other events. Typically they use a completely standard Mini Cooper S and/or a Mitsubishi Lancer Evolution, though Russ has performed in countless other vehicles, including Peugeots, Vauxhalls, Nissans, MGs, Land Rovers, Black Cabs, Subarus, and 13-tonne lorries.

Swift's career has also seen the use of the classic Minis, which he used to capture four British Autotest Championships and a rally win in Sweden in the early 1980s.

Swift has collaborated for TV commercials with Opel, Fiat, Standard Bank, MG, Mini. He has cooperated with the TV shows Top Gear, 5th Gear, Guinness World Records, GMTV, Learner Drivers (title sequence), and others, and as an advisor to many police, military, royal and diplomatic drivers. Swift has held three Guinness World Records and has done more than 8,000 stunt shows in 50 countries.

Russ has collaborated in Jeremy Clarkson's videos and on two episodes of Top Gear, in which he proved that elderly people needn't be slow and poor drivers, by teaching grannies to do donuts and handbrake parking.

=== Guinness World Records ===
- Parallel parking in tightest space
- J-turn in tightest space
- Fastest time doing 10 do-nuts. (Driving)

=== Appearances ===
- Top Gear series 1, episodes 3, 6
- Tiff Needell: Burning Rubber (2001)
- Clarkson: No Limits (2002)
- Clarkson: Heaven and Hell (2005)
- Swiftly Does It (2005) (Duke Video) A documentary following the unique career of the world's No.1 display driver, Russ Swift.

Auto Trader's editors have speculated that Swift is the likeliest known identity of The Stig, due to Swift's proximity to the Top Gear franchise, obscurity relative to high-profile drivers, and his skills with cars.

== Personal life ==
Swift currently resides in the village of Finghall, North Yorkshire. His son, Paul Swift, is also a professional driver..
