= Paul Swift (driver) =

British driver (born 1979)

- Nationality: (United Kingdom) British
- Born: July 1979 (age 46) Darlington, England

Awards
- 2004 2005 2006 2007: MSA / BTRDA British Autotest Championship

Paul Swift is a British stunt driver who works in autotesting, precision driving, and live-action arena and motor shows, including the UK Motorshow and Top Gear Live. He is the son of British stunt driver Russ Swift.

Paul Swift at age 7

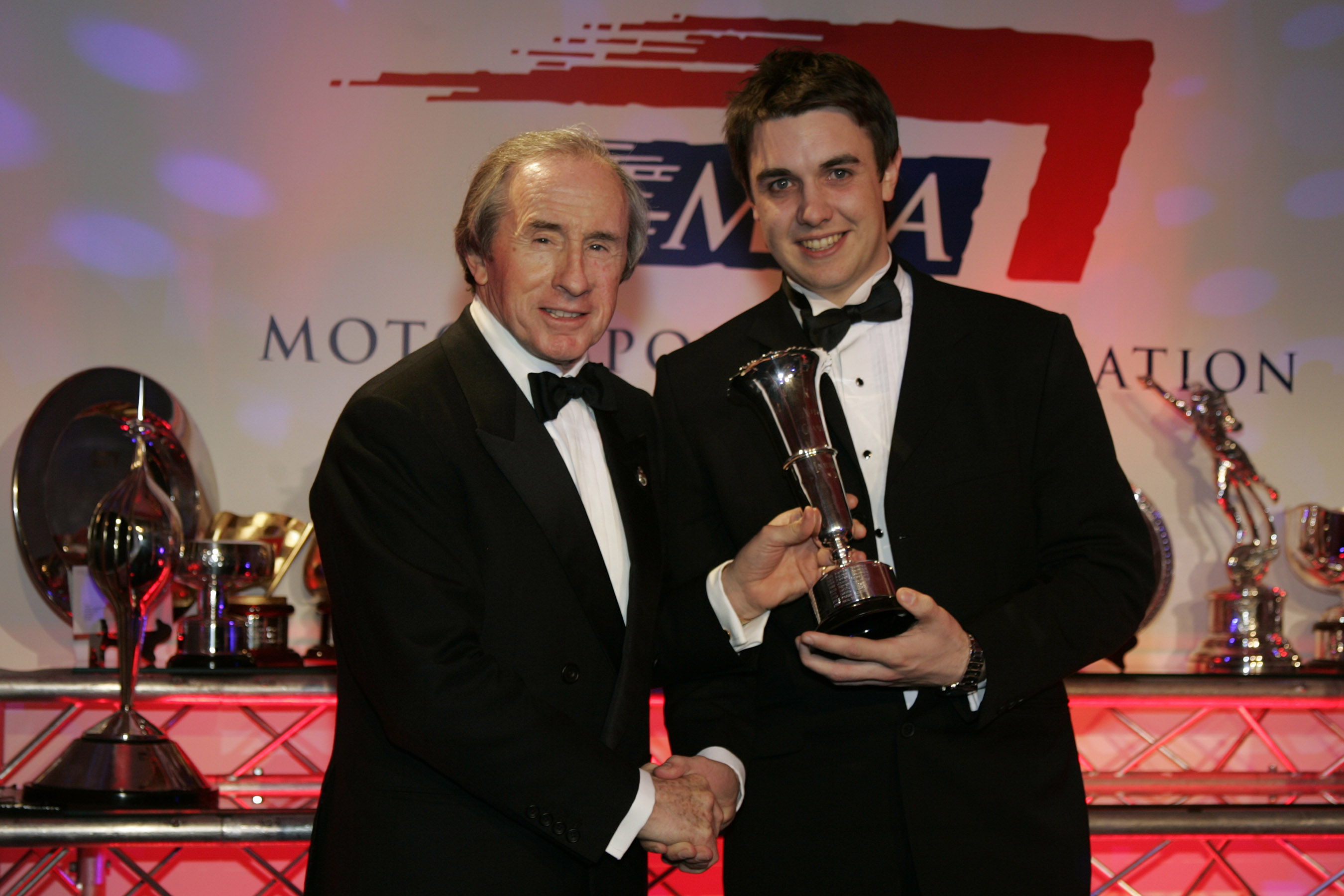
MSA awards

== Career ==
Swift started his stunt driving career at the age of seven, when he learned to drive his family’s ride-on-lawn-mower on two wheels. Within three months he had set a world record performing the stunt over a distance of 230m.

His first precision driving show was as part of his father's display team in a Miniature Rover Montego at the British Grand Prix at Silverstone. At age 16, Swift began competing in auto testing with both Durham and Hartlepool motor clubs. He won the regional championship in 1998 and later competed in national auto testing, going on to win over 40 events outright, including seven national titles. Swift would also represent England.

In 2006, Swift became the first Englishman to win a round of the Northern Irish Autotest Championship, driving a borrowed Mini Special. The following season, after winning his seventh British Championship, Swift announced his retirement from auto testing and left his job as a mechanical engineer to concentrate on stunt driving.

Swift operates a precision driving experience/stunt driving company called Paul Swift Productions.

== Appearances ==
Swift has appeared on BBC's Top Gear television on a number of occasions, and led the Top Gear Live stunt team for seven years. He has appeared on television programs including Britain’s Got Talent, Emmerdale, Fifth Gear, and Guinness World Records Smashed.

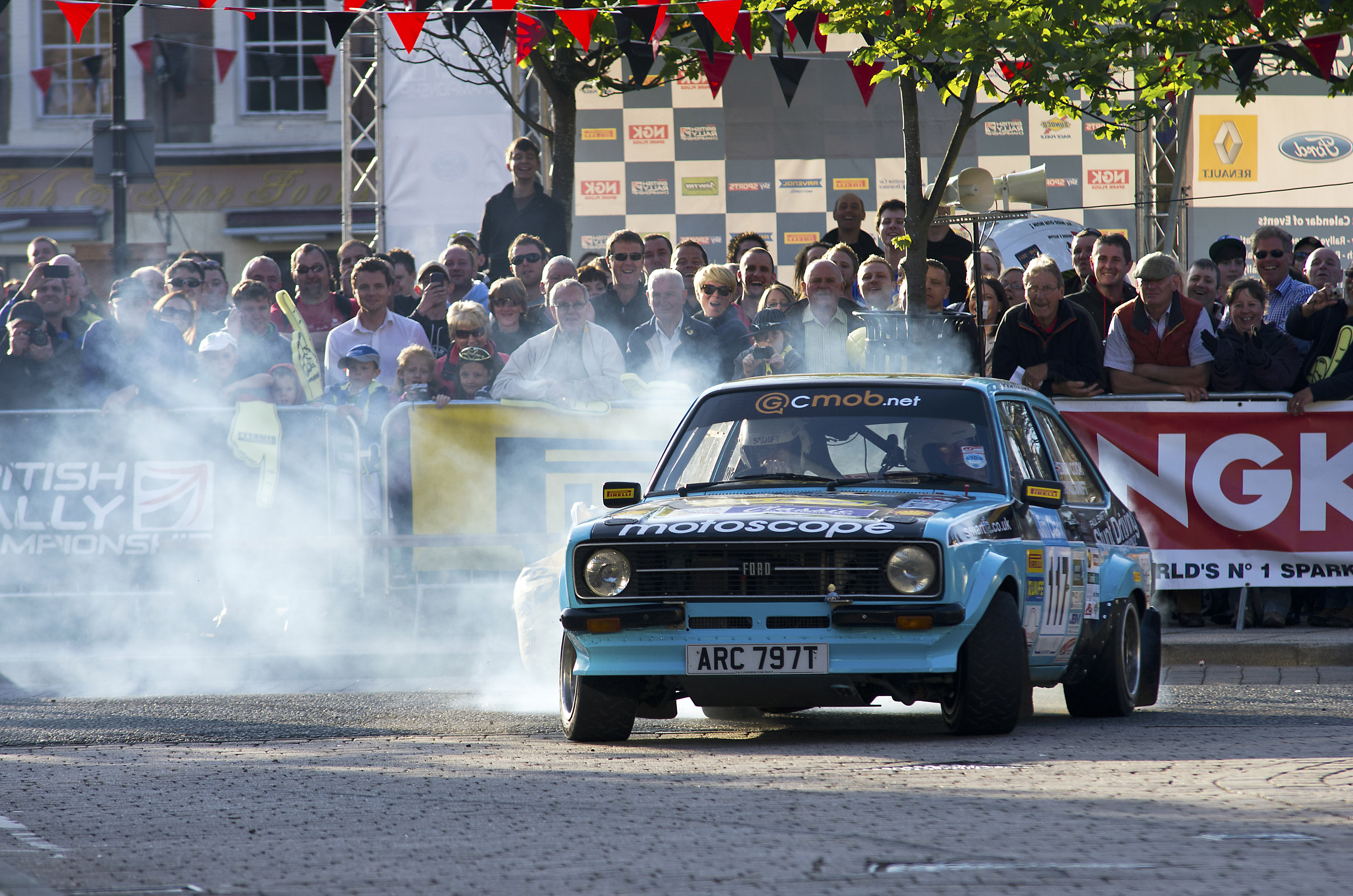
Swift's Mk2 Escort
