= Kenzo Craigie =

British racing driver (born 2010)

- Born: 29 September 2010 (age 16); Epsom, Surrey, England
- Nationality: (United Kingdom) British

Italian F4 Championship career
- Debut season: 2026
- Current team: R-ace GP
- Car number: 34
- Starts: 21
- Wins: 2
- Podiums: 7
- Poles: 0
- Fastest laps: 4
- Best finish: 3rd in 2026

Previous series
- 2026; 2026; 2026: Italian F4; Euro 4; UAE4 Series

Championship titles
- 2026; 2026: FIA F4 World Cup; Euro 4

Awards
- 2024: FIA Action of the Year
- Statistics up to date as of 22 November 2026.

Kenzo Craigie (/ˈkɛn.zoʊ ˈkreɪ.ɡiː/; (Note: KEN-zoh KRAY-gee) born 29 September 2010) is a British racing driver who last competed in the Italian F4 Championship for R-ace GP as part of the Mercedes Junior Programme.

Born and raised in Epsom to a Jamaican father and French mother, Craigie began competitive kart racing aged six. After a successful karting career—culminating in his victory at the junior World Championship in 2024—Craigie graduated to junior formulae. In Formula 4, he was third in UAE4 and the Italian Championship in 2026, taking his maiden titles in Euro 4 and the FIA F4 World Cup.

== Early life ==
Kenzo Craigie was born on 29 September 2010 in Epsom, Surrey, England. He is of Guadeloupean lineage through his French mother, Flora, while his father, Paul, is Afro-Jamaican; he wears both flags alongside the Union Jack on his racing helmet, telling The New York Times in 2025 that "representation really drives [him]". He initially played association football and says he was a member of the Chelsea youth academy before his father introduced him to kart racing.

Craigie's association with Lewis Hamilton—the only black driver in Formula One history—began when he joined the Mercedes Junior Team in 2023, expressing his desire to continue Hamilton's efforts to increase ethnic diversity and female representation in motorsport. Alongside Hamilton, he proclaims Marcus Rashford as his sporting idol and is a fan of football club Manchester United. Raised in Epsom, he is privately educated at Downsend School in nearby Leatherhead.

== Racing career ==
=== Karting (2017–2025) ===
==== 2017–2023: Prominence in Britain and international debut ====
At six years old, Craigie started kart racing at the local Daytona Sandown Park and debuted in the bambino ranks of the British scene, scoring a podium in his first race. By 2020, he had emerged in club championships across England, placing fifth in the TVKC Autumn Cup and twenty-fourth in the British Championships. He debuted on the international scene in 2021 at the RMC Grand Finals in Sakhir, having improved to ninth in the British Championships. He dominated the national Cadet class the following year, winning the Ultimate Karting Championship, Kartmasters British Grand Prix, British 'O' Plate, and finishing runner-up in the British Championships, where his successes saw him claim the Mark Hines Memorial Trophy and his nomination to represent the United Kingdom in the CIK-FIA Academy Trophy. He closed his cadet career by winning the TVKC Icebreaker Cup at PF International. Part of the Mercedes Junior Team from 2023 onwards, he stepped up to the junior international Rotax Max and IAME categories, where he finished runner-up in the RMC Euro Trophy and English Championship with Argenti Motorsport, as well as tenth and twelfth in the X30 Junior and Junior Max categories of the British Championships, respectively; he finished twentieth in the RMC Grand Finals.

==== 2024–2025: World Champion ====
Short-term [goals are], just keep on progressing with my career—trying to be a better driver every day, and a better person. Just keep on pushing, and hopefully everything will align.

You always want to do your best, but in racing, it is really easy to over-push and try to do too much and then it will not work out.

You just have to stay calm and let things come to you and even if it does not go as quickly as possible, if you just stay calm, hopefully it will come your way.

— Craigie discussing his goals with The New York Times upon his graduation to junior formulae in 2025

In 2024, aged 13, Craigie progressed to OK-Junior—the premier under-15 international class—under the wing of six-time World Champion Mike Wilson, finishing nineteenth in the European Championship and third in Champions of the Future. His World Championship debut was staged at PF International, where he won a club championship round the year prior, and proved a battle for victory between him and compatriot Noah Baglin; in torrential rain, Craigie closed a three-second gap to Baglin by the final lap, when they swapped positions repeatedly—often going off-circuit—until a final-corner collision saw Baglin in the wall and Craigie becoming World Champion. After closing the season by winning the IAME Warriors Final in X30 Junior, Fabio Marangon of Vroomkart stated karting was "Craigie's world, and we are just living in it" and contrasted his acclaim to Kimi Antonelli. His battle with Baglin and eventual overtake was named the FIA Action of the Year in karting.

Craigie's progression to the senior OK class in 2025 was met with mixed results, opening with ninth in the WSK Super Master Series and fourteenth in the IAME Winter Cup. His highlight of the season was victory in Champions of the Future over eventual World Champion Thibaut Ramaekers and European Champion Christian Costoya, his second international title. Craigie finished tenth in the European Championship, scoring nearly half of his points with a podium in the season-ending Rødby final. He closed his karting career with fifth in the World Championship at Kristianstad, the same position he ranked in-class in the International Karting Ranking. Upon his graduation to junior formulae, Sam Joseph of The New York Times proclaimed Craigie as a "prodigy".

=== Formula 4 (2026–present) ===
Craigie debuted in junior formulae with his 2026 pre-season campaign in the UAE4 Series with R-ace GP, with whom he tested Formula 4 (F4) machinery extensively over the winter break. On debut at Yas Marina, he finished seventh in a race-long battle with Elia Weiss in the opening race before claiming his maiden podium in the reverse-grid race and another points finish to end the weekend third in the championship. Another three points finishes followed for Craigie in the second Yas Marina round. He took his maiden pole positions at Dubai—the second with a margin of 0.492 seconds over championship leader Oleksandr Bondarev—where he took his maiden victory in the opening race and dropped behind Bondarev in the final race to solidify his third-place overall. He closed the season with two points finishes and a mechanical retirement following a collision with Tomass Štolcermanis at Lusail. He ended the campaign on 118 points—73 behind third-year champion Oleksandr Bondarev—with one victory from three podiums and two poles, as well as the rookies' title over Christian Costoya.

For his main campaign, Craigie remained with R-ace GP in Italian F4. Following two points finishes on debut at Misano, including thirteenth in the final, he improved to eighth in the Vallelunga final. Having finished seventh and sixth in the opening races at Monza, in which he was penalised from the podium in race one for contact with Thomas Bearman, before Craigie ended the weekend with a crash at Lesmo-II in the final. At the first Mugello round, Craigie took his first podium of the season in race one, before charging from fourth to first in the final to take his first win of the season. Craigie then won race two at Imola, as well as finishing second in the other two races, before ending the season with further podiums at Misano and Mugello end the campaign fourth overall, whilst also sealing the rookies' title. The mid-season E4 Championship opened at Vallelunga, where Craigie won the second race and trailed Luka Sammalisto in the standings, before surpassing him with two victories and another podium at Paul Ricard following a hat-trick of poles. Craigie then won race one at Monza, finished at the back in race two following a collision, before taking third at the finale to clinch the E4 title on countback over Sammalisto.

=== Formula One ===
In February 2023, Craigie became the youngest member of the Mercedes Junior Team, aged 12.

== Awards and honours ==
- FIA Action of the Year: 2024
- Mark Hines Memorial Trophy: 2022

== Karting record ==
=== Karting career summary ===
| Season | Series | Team | Position |
|---|---|---|---|
| 2019 | Camberley Kart Club — Honda Cadet | Ambition Motorsport | NC† |
| 2019 | Shenington Kart Racing Club — Honda Cadet | Ambition Motorsport | NC† |
| 2020 | Clay Pigeon Kart Club — Honda Cadet | Ambition Motorsport | NC† |
| 2020 | Lydd International Kart Club — Honda Cadet | Ambition Motorsport | 22nd |
| 2020 | East of England Cup — Honda Cadet | Ambition Motorsport | NC† |
| 2020 | Kartmasters British Grand Prix — Honda Cadet | Ambition Motorsport | 32nd |
| 2020 | Fulbeck Championship — Honda Cadet | Ambition Motorsport | NC† |
| 2020 | TVKC Autumn Cup — Honda Cadet | Ambition Motorsport | 5th |
| 2020 | British Championships — Honda Cadet | Ambition Motorsport | 24th |
| 2021 | PF Challenge Cup — Honda Cadet | Ambition Motorsport | 21st |
| 2021 | Wessex Challenge — Honda Cadet | Ambition Motorsport | 9th |
| 2021 | Dunkeswell Kart Club — Honda Cadet | Ambition Motorsport | NC† |
| 2021 | Clay Pigeon Kart Club — Honda Cadet | Ambition Motorsport | NC† |
| 2021 | Kartmasters British Grand Prix — Honda Cadet | Ambition Motorsport | 4th |
| 2021 | British 'O' Plate — Honda Cadet | Ambition Motorsport | NC |
| 2021 | British Championships — Honda Cadet | Ambition Motorsport | 9th |
| 2021 | RMC Golden Trophy — Micro Max | | 20th |
| 2021 | RMC Grand Finals — Micro Max | | 34th |
| 2022 | RMC Euro Trophy — Mini Max | | 34th |
| 2022 | PF Challenge Cup — Honda Cadet | | 21st |
| 2022 | Kartmasters British Grand Prix — Honda Cadet | Zip Factory Team | 1st |
| 2022 | Kartmasters British Grand Prix — IAME Water Swift | Argenti Motorsport | 14th |
| 2022 | Ultimate Karting Championship — Honda Cadet | Ambition Motorsport | 1st |
| 2022 | British 'O' Plate — IAME Water Swift | Argenti Motorsport | 9th |
| 2022 | British 'O' Plate — Honda Academy | Zip Factory Team | 1st |
| 2022 | British Championships — Honda Cadet | Zip Factory Team | 2nd |
| 2022 | London Cup — Honda Cadet | Zip Factory Team | 2nd |
| 2023 | TVKC Icebreaker Cup — IAME Water Swift | Argenti Motorsport | 1st |
| 2023 | British 'O' Plate — Junior Max | Argenti Motorsport | 26th |
| 2023 | Ultimate Karting Championship — Junior Max | Argenti Motorsport | 75th |
| 2023 | Shenington SuperPrix — X30 Junior | Argenti Motorsport | 11th |
| 2023 | English Championship — Junior Max | Argenti Motorsport | 2nd |
| 2023 | RMC Euro Trophy — Junior Max | | 2nd |
| 2023 | British Championships — X30 Junior | Argenti Motorsport | 10th |
| 2023 | British Championships — Junior Max | Argenti Motorsport | 12th |
| 2023 | Trent Valley Kart Club — Junior Max | Argenti Motorsport | 41st |
| 2023 | RMC Grand Finals — Junior Max | | 20th |
| 2023 | International Karting Ranking | | 213th |
| 2023 | International Karting Ranking — Junior Max | | 6th |
| 2024 | TVKC Winter Warmer Trophy — X30 Junior | Argenti Motorsport | 6th |
| 2024 | British 'O' Plate — Junior Max | Argenti Motorsport | 8th |
| 2024 | IAME Euro Series — X30 Junior | GGM | 19th |
| 2024 | British Championships — Junior Max | Argenti Motorsport | 44th |
| 2024 | CIK-FIA European Championship — OK-J | Prema Racing | 19th |
| 2024 | Champions of the Future — OK-J | Prema Racing | 3rd |
| 2024 | CIK-FIA World Championship — OK-J | Prema Racing | 1st |
| 2024 | British Championships — X30 Junior | Argenti Motorsport | 4th |
| 2024 | IAME Warriors Final — X30 Junior | VictoryLane | 1st |
| 2024 | International Karting Ranking | | 21st |
| 2024 | International Karting Ranking — OK-J | | 9th |
| 2025 | IAME Winter Cup — X30 Senior | VictoryLane | 14th |
| 2025 | WSK Super Master Series — OK | Prema Racing | 9th |
| 2025 | CIK-FIA European Championship — OK | Prema Racing | 10th |
| 2025 | Champions of the Future — OK | Prema Racing | 1st |
| 2025 | CIK-FIA World Championship — OK | Prema Racing | 5th |
| 2025 | International Karting Ranking | | 12th |
| 2025 | International Karting Ranking — OK | | 5th |
Source: (Note: Additional references are stated in § Karting (2017–2025).)

^{†} As Craigie was a guest driver, he was ineligible for championship points.

== Racing record ==
=== Racing career summary ===
| Season | Series | Team | Races | Wins | Poles | F/Laps | Podiums | Points | Position |
|---|---|---|---|---|---|---|---|---|---|
| 2026 | UAE4 Series | R-ace GP | 12 | 1 | 2 | 0 | 3 | 118 | 3rd |
| 2026 | Italian F4 Championship | R-ace GP | 21 | 2 | 0 | 4 | 7 | 326 | 3rd |
| 2026 | E4 Championship | R-ace GP | 9 | 4 | 3 | 5 | 6 | 190 | 1st |
| 2026 | FIA F4 World Cup | R-ace GP | 2 | 2 | 1 | 1 | 2 | —N/a | 1st |

=== Complete UAE4 Series results ===
(key) (Races in bold indicate pole position; races in italics indicate fastest lap)

| Year | Entrant | 1 | 2 | 3 | 4 | 5 | 6 | 7 | 8 | 9 | 10 | 11 | 12 | Pos | Points |
|---|---|---|---|---|---|---|---|---|---|---|---|---|---|---|---|
| 2026 | R-ace GP | YMC1; 1; 7 | YMC1; 2; 3 | YMC1; 3; 6 | YMC2; 1; 4 | YMC2; 2; 9 | YMC2; 3; 5 | **DUB**; **1**; 1 | DUB; 2; 7 | **DUB**; **3**; 2 | LUS; 1; 4 | LUS; 2; 8 | LUS; 3 Ret | 3rd | 118 |

=== Complete Italian F4 Championship results ===
(key) (Races in bold indicate pole position; races in italics indicate fastest lap)

| Year | Entrant | 1 | 2 | 3 | 4 | 5 | 6 | 7 | 8 | 9 | 10 | 11 | 12 | 13 | 14 | 15 | 16 | 17 | 18 | 19 | 20 | 21 | 22 | 23 | 24 | 25 | 26 | 27 | 28 | Pos | Points |
|---|---|---|---|---|---|---|---|---|---|---|---|---|---|---|---|---|---|---|---|---|---|---|---|---|---|---|---|---|---|---|---|
| 2026 | R-ace GP | MIS1; 1; 24† | MIS1; 2 (13) | MIS1; 3 | MIS1; 4; 13 | VLL; 1; 20 | VLL; 2 | VLL; 3; 5 | VLL; 4; 8 | MNZ; 1; 7 | MNZ; 2; 6 | MNZ; 3 | MNZ; 4 Ret | MUG1; 1; 2 | MUG1; 2 | MUG1; 3; 4 | MUG1; 4; 1 | IMO; 1; 2 | IMO; 2 | IMO; 3; 1 | IMO; 4; 2 | MIS2; 1 Ret | MIS2; 2; 2 | MIS2; 3 | MIS2; 4; 7 | MUG2; 1 | MUG2; 2; 2 | MUG2; 3; 5 | MUG2; 4; 4 | 3rd | 326 |

^{†} Did not finish, but was classified as he had completed more than 90% of the race distance.

=== Complete E4 Championship results ===
(key) (Races in bold indicate pole position; races in italics indicate fastest lap)

| Year | Entrant | 1 | 2 | 3 | 4 | 5 | 6 | 7 | 8 | 9 | Pos | Points |
|---|---|---|---|---|---|---|---|---|---|---|---|---|
| 2026 | R-ace GP | VLL; 1; 6 | VLL; 2; 1 | VLL; 3; 9 | **LEC**; **1**; 3 | **LEC**; **2**; 1 | **LEC**; **3**; 1 | MNZ; 1; 1 | MNZ; 2; 28† | MNZ; 3; 3 | 1st | 190 |

=== Complete FIA F4 World Cup results ===
| Year | Entrant | Car | Qualifying | Quali race | Main race |
|---|---|---|---|---|---|
| 2026 | (France) R-ace GP | Tatuus F4-T421 | 7th | 1st | 1st |

== Notes ==
Sporting positions
Awards
| Preceded by Established | FIA Action of the Year (Karting World Championship); 2025 | Succeeded by Evan Purcell |
