= FIA Prize Giving Ceremony =

Annual event

The FIA Prize Giving Ceremony is an annual event promoted by Fédération Internationale de l'Automobile (FIA) which honours the achievements of all FIA champions over the previous season.

In 2014, the FIA introduced a new format where the champions and guests took part in a competition held at a kart circuit designed by Hermann Tilke, under the race direction of Charlie Whiting. Rookie of the Year and Action of the Year are presented annually, whilst awards such as Personality of the Year have previously been awarded. Other special awards include Outstanding Official of the Year and the President Innovation Medal.

== Location ==
The 1995 ceremony was to take place in Monte Carlo, Monaco, but was cancelled due to the general strikes in nearby France.

Year	Country	City	Ref
1996	Monaco	Monte Carlo	
1997	Monaco	Monte Carlo	
1998	Monaco	Monte Carlo	
1999	Monaco	Monte Carlo	
2000	Monaco	Monte Carlo	
2001	Monaco	Monte Carlo	
2002	Monaco	Monte Carlo	
2003	Monaco	Monte Carlo	
2004	Monaco	Monte Carlo	
2005	Monaco	Monte Carlo	
2006	Monaco	Monte Carlo	
2007	Monaco	Monte Carlo	
2008	Monaco	Monte Carlo	
2009	Monaco	Monte Carlo	
2010	Monaco	Monte Carlo	
2011	India	New Delhi	
2012	Turkey	Istanbul	
2013	France	Paris	
2014	Qatar	Doha	
2015	France	Paris	
2016	Austria	Vienna	
2017	France	Versailles	
2018	Russia	Saint Petersburg	
2019	France	Paris	
2020	Switzerland	Geneva	
2021	France	Paris	
2022	Italy	Bologna	
2023	Azerbaijan	Baku	
2024	Rwanda	Kigali	
2025	Uzbekistan	Tashkent	
2026	China	Shanghai	

== Awards winners ==
=== Personality of the Year ===
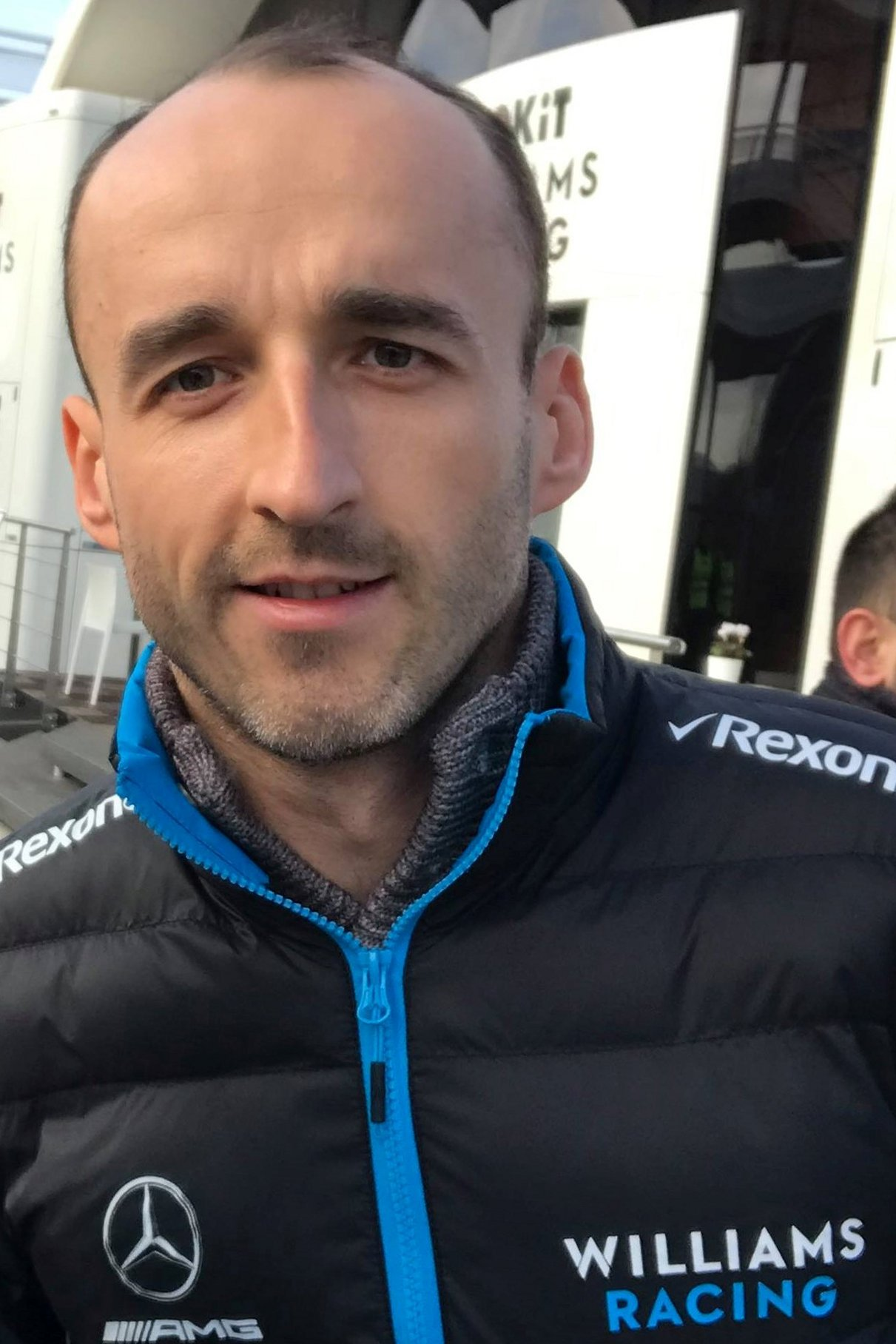
Robert Kubica: winner of Personality of the Year award in 2013

The FIA Personality of the Year award sees permanently accredited media from the FIA's World Championships honour the competitor or figure who they believe achieved an exceptional performance this season. This figure can be a driver, a team manager, an official, a volunteer, etc., affiliated to an FIA Championship or Event. Each member of the media is required to vote for three individuals in the first stage before choosing from a final selection of ten. The Personality of the Year award was dropped ahead of the 2022 Prize Giving Ceremony, replaced with two new prize categories.

Year	Winner	Series	Role	Ref.
2013	(Poland) Robert Kubica	World Rally Championship	Driver	
2014	(United Kingdom) Lewis Hamilton	Formula One	Driver	
2015	(Netherlands) Max Verstappen	Formula One	Driver	
2016	(Netherlands) Max Verstappen	Formula One	Driver	
2017	(Netherlands) Max Verstappen	Formula One	Driver	
2018	(United Kingdom) Lewis Hamilton	Formula One	Driver	
2019	(Austria) Niki Lauda	Formula One	Team personnel	
2020	(United Kingdom) Lewis Hamilton	Formula One	Driver	
2021	(United Kingdom) Lewis Hamilton	Formula One	Driver	

=== Action of the Year ===
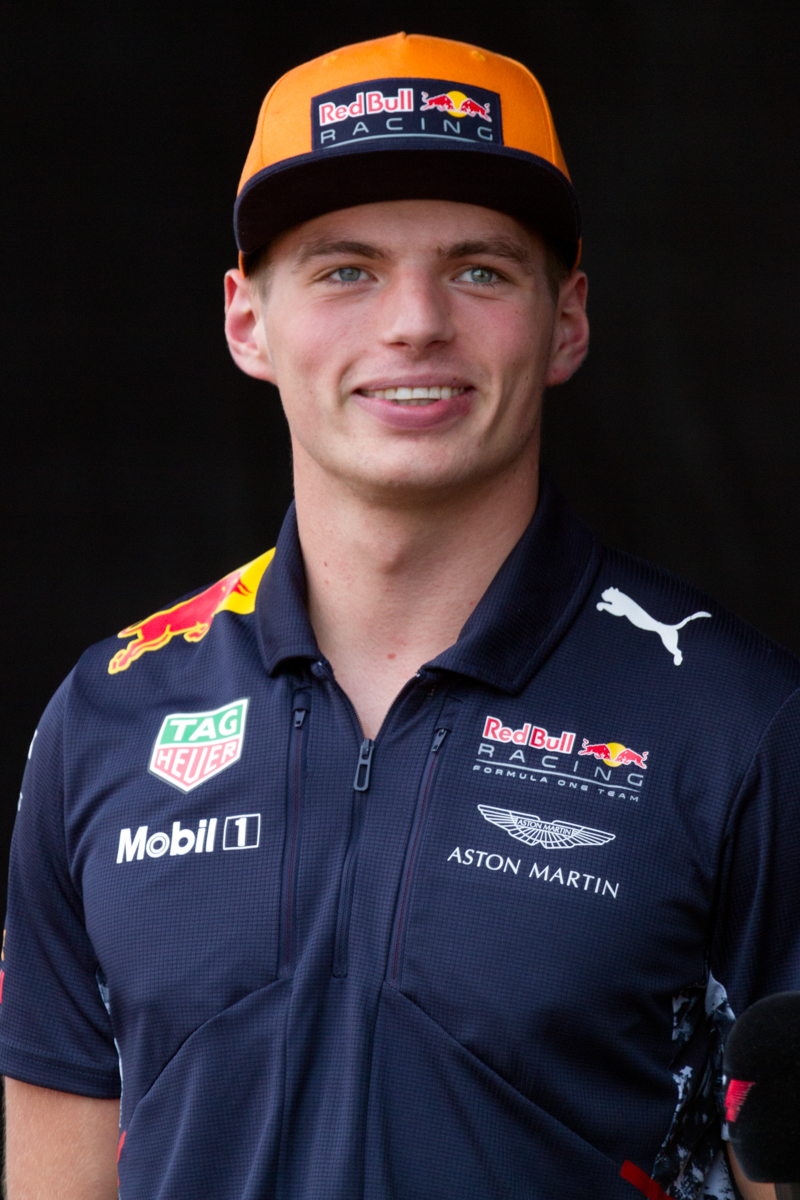
Max Verstappen: winner of Action of the Year award in 2014, 2015, 2016, 2019 and 2025.

The FIA Action of the Year award allows motorsport fans to choose their defining event of the sporting year. Balloting for the award is undertaken by motor racing fans via the FIA's official website.

Year	Winner	Series	Event	Ref.
2014	(Netherlands) Max Verstappen	Formula 3 European Championship	Overtaking Antonio Giovinazzi in Imola	
2015	(Netherlands) Max Verstappen	Formula One	Overtaking Felipe Nasr at the Belgian Grand Prix	
2016	(Netherlands) Max Verstappen	Formula One	Overtaking Nico Rosberg at the Brazilian Grand Prix	
2017	(Finland) Esapekka Lappi	World Rally Championship	Jump at the Rally de Portugal	
2018	(Finland) Teemu Suninen	World Rally Championship	Save at Rally Finland	
2019	(Netherlands) Max Verstappen	Formula One	Overtaking Charles Leclerc at the British Grand Prix	
2020	(Finland) Kimi Räikkönen	Formula One	Opening lap at the Portuguese Grand Prix	
2021	(Spain) Fernando Alonso	Formula One	Defending position against Lewis Hamilton at the Hungarian Grand Prix	
2022	(United Kingdom) Lewis Hamilton	Formula One	Overtaking Charles Leclerc and Sergio Pérez at the British Grand Prix	
2023	(Spain) Fernando Alonso	Formula One	Overtaking Sergio Pérez on the last lap of the São Paulo Grand Prix	

Beginning in 2024, the award was divided into seven categories, for the FIA World Championship in each motorsport discipline.

==== Formula One ====
Year	Winner	Event	Ref.
2024	(Mexico) Sergio Pérez	Overtaking Carlos Sainz Jr. and Fernando Alonso at the Chinese Grand Prix sprint	
2025	(Netherlands) Max Verstappen	Overtaking Oscar Piastri at the Emilia Romagna Grand Prix	

==== World Rally Championship ====
Year	Winner	Event	Ref.
2024	(France) Adrien Fourmaux	Jump at the Safari Rally	
2025	(Estonia) Ott Tänak	Driving through mud at the Safari Rally	

==== World Endurance Championship ====
Year	Winner	Event	Ref.
2024	(France) Julien Andlauer	Overtaking Paul-Loup Chatin at the 6 Hours of Spa-Francorchamps	
2025	(France) Loïc Duval	Overtaking Antonio Giovinazzi and Robin Frijns at the 6 Hours of Spa-Francorchamps	

==== Formula E ====
Year	Winner	Event	Ref.
2024	(United Kingdom) Sam Bird	Overtaking Mitch Evans on the last lap of the São Paulo ePrix	
2025	(Germany) Maximilian Günther	Overtaking Oliver Rowland on the last lap of the Jeddah ePrix	

==== World Rallycross Championship ====
Year	Winner	Event	Ref.
2024	(Sweden) Klara Andersson	Overtaking Kevin Hansen and Timmy Hansen at the World RX of Hungary	
2025	(Sweden) Kevin Hansen	Save at the World RX of Sweden	

==== World Rally-Raid Championship ====
Year	Winner	Event	Ref.
2024	(France) Loïc Minaudier (France) Mathieu Serradori	Moving motorbike at the Dakar Rally	
2025	(Brazil) Lucas Moraes (Spain) Armand Monleon	Chasing Nasser Al-Attiyah and Édouard Boulanger at the Abu Dhabi Desert Challenge	

==== Karting World Championship ====
Year	Winner	Event	Ref.
2024	(United Kingdom) Kenzo Craigie	Overtaking Noah Baglin on the last lap of the OK-Junior World Championship	
2025	(United Kingdom) Evan Purcell	Save at the OK-Junior World Championship	

=== Rookie of the Year ===
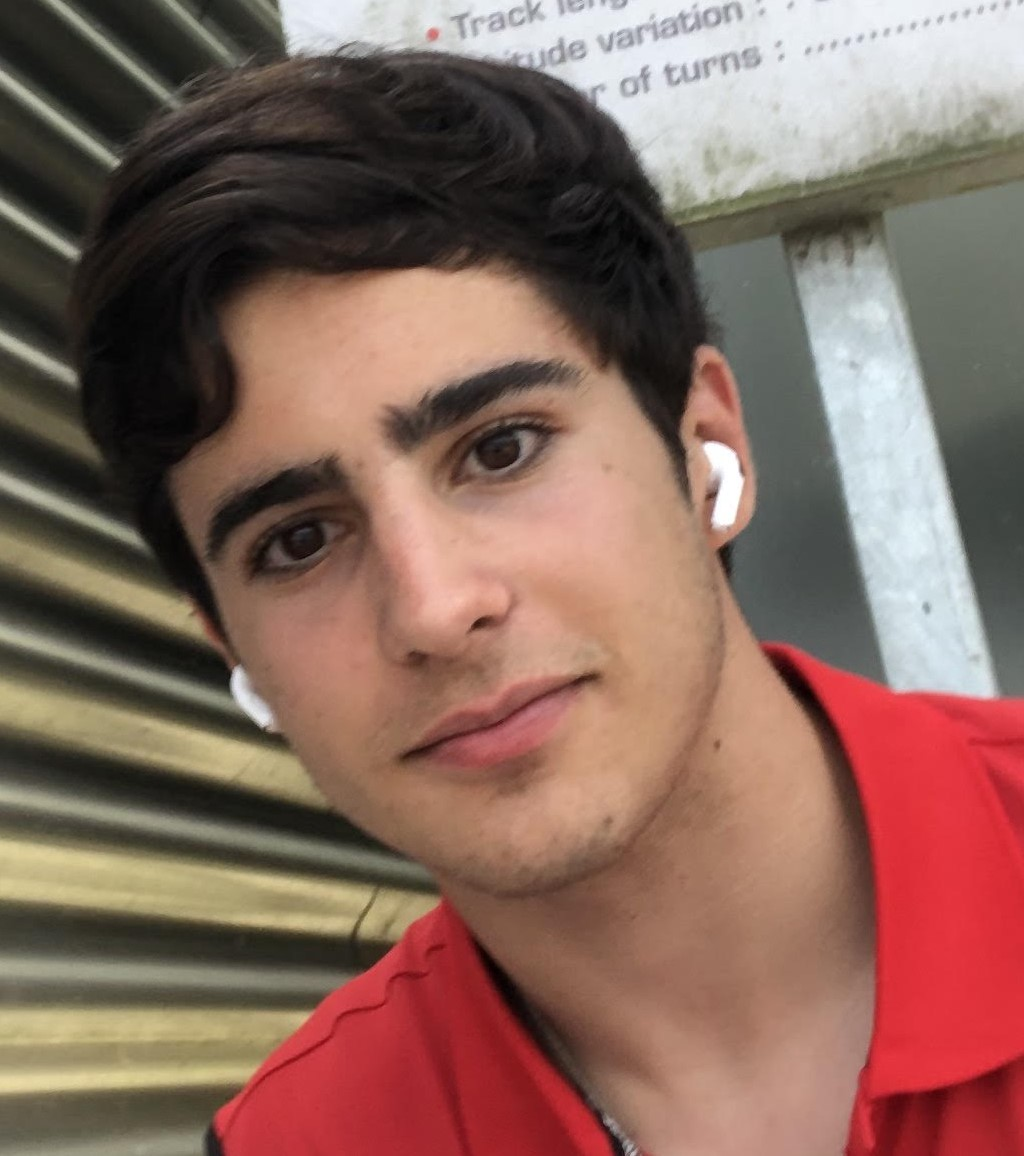
Rafael Câmara is the most recent winner of the Rookie of the Year award, having won it in 2025.

The FIA Rookie of the Year is selected amongst drivers who completed their first season in an FIA-sanctioned championship. Eligible series include the FIA Formula One World Championship, World Rally Championship, European Rally Championship, World Touring Car Championship, FIA World Endurance Championship, World Rallycross Championship, European Rallycross Championship, FIA Formula 2 Championship, FIA Formula Three Championships, and Karting KF World Championship.

Year	Winner	Series	Ref.
2014	(Russia) Daniil Kvyat	Formula One	
2015	(Netherlands) Max Verstappen	Formula One	
2016	(Sweden) Kevin Hansen	European Rallycross	
2017	(Monaco) Charles Leclerc	Formula 2	
2018	(Monaco) Charles Leclerc	Formula One	
2019	(Thailand) Alexander Albon	Formula One	
2020	(Japan) Yuki Tsunoda	Formula 2	
2021	(Australia) Oscar Piastri	Formula 2	
2022	(Barbados) Zane Maloney	Formula 3	
2023	(Australia) Oscar Piastri	Formula One	
2024	(Brazil) Gabriel Bortoleto	Formula 2	
2025	(Brazil) Rafael Câmara	Formula 3	

=== Outstanding Official of the Year ===
The FIA Outstanding Official of the Year, one of two new categories introduced in 2022, is selected amongst the FIA's "army of volunteers and officials who form the backbone of the sport". The winner is selected by the FIA Volunteers and Officials Commission (VOC).

Year	Winner	Role	Ref.
2022	(Mexico) Filiberto Loranca Marañón	Clerk of the Course, Mexico City Grand Prix	
2023	(Bahrain) Sadiq Kalawadh	Manager of Events, Bahrain International Circuit	
2024	(Australia) Carol Anne Armstrong	Official for various FIA championships	
2025	(South Africa) Steve Harding	Official for various FIA championships	

=== FIA President Innovation Medal ===
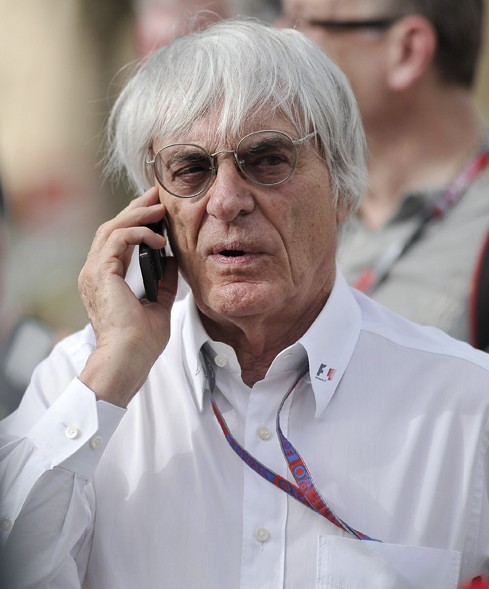
Bernie Ecclestone: winner of FIA President Innovation Medal in 2024

The FIA President Innovation Medal, one of two new categories introduced in 2022, was created by current FIA president Mohammed Ben Sulayem to recognize "people coming with ideas helping not only the sport but also in worldwide context". The winner is selected by the incumbent FIA president.

Year	Winner	Role	Ref.
2022	(South Africa) Gordon Murray	Road and race car design (Formula One)	
2023	(Sweden) Christian von Koenigsegg	Automotive engineering	
2024	(United Kingdom) Bernie Ecclestone	Promotion of Formula One	
2025	(Italy) Enzo Ferrari	Founder of Scuderia Ferrari	
