= Williams F1 Team Driver Academy =

Program to support young racing drivers through their careers

(United Kingdom) Williams F1 Team Driver Academy
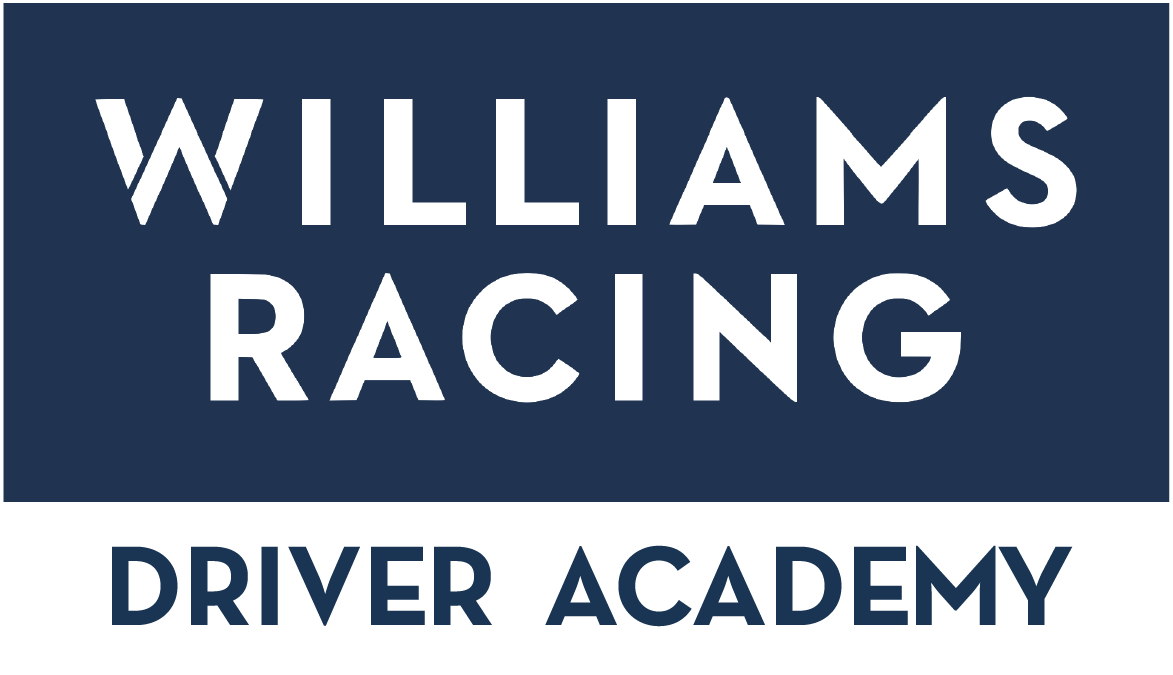
- Founded: 2016; 10 years ago (as Williams Young Driver Programme)
- Base: Grove, Oxfordshire, England
- Team principal(s): Sven Smeets
- Current drivers: Super Formula (United Kingdom) Luke Browning; FIA Formula 3 (France) Alessandro Giusti; Formula Regional (United Kingdom) Kean Nakamura-Berta (Ukraine) Oleksandr Bondarev; F1 Academy (France) Jade Jacquet; Karting (Netherlands) Dean Hoogendoorn (United States) Lucas Palacio (United Kingdom) Will Green
- Website: https://www.williamsf1.com/academy-drivers

The Williams F1 Team Driver Academy, formerly known as the Williams Young Driver Programme and Williams Racing Driver Academy, is a driver development programme by Formula One team Williams. It is meant to promote talent in different racing series by helping them with funds, with the hope of finding drivers who will race for the team in the future. Notable graduates of the scheme are Lance Stroll, Nicholas Latifi, Jack Aitken, Logan Sargeant and Franco Colapinto; all of whom made their F1 debuts with Williams.

== Current drivers ==
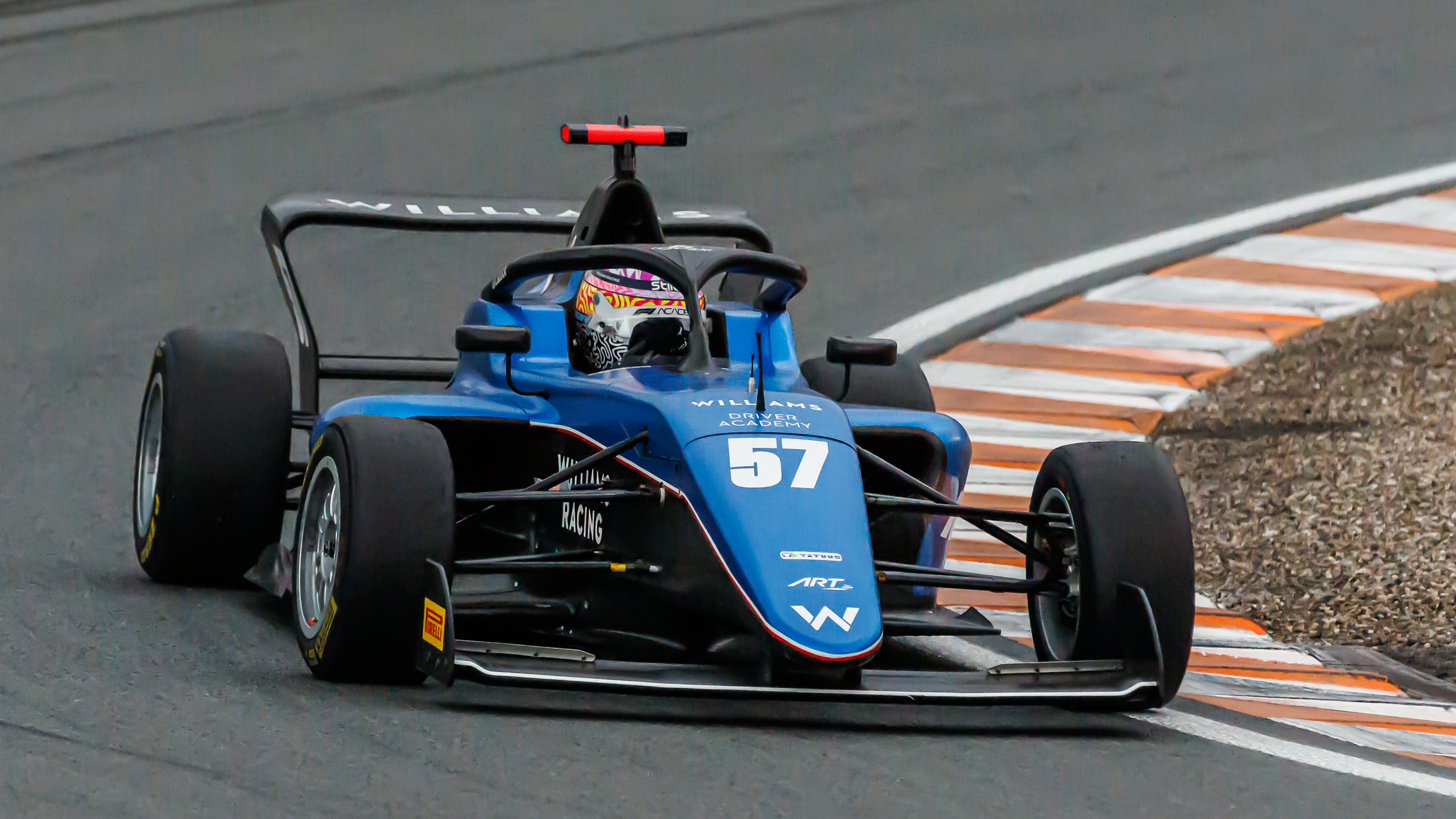
F1 Academy driver Lia Block driving a Williams liveried Tatuus F4-T421 at Zandvoort during the 2024 F1 Academy season

Driver	Years	Current Series	Titles as Williams Driver Academy member
(Ukraine) Oleksandr Bondarev	2023–	UAE4 Series; Italian F4 Championship; E4 Championship; Formula Regional European Championship	UAE4 Series (2026)
(United Kingdom) Luke Browning	2023–	Super Formula Championship	FIA F3 World Cup (2023)
(France) Alessandro Giusti	2024–	FIA Formula 3 Championship	None
(Netherlands) Dean Hoogendoorn	2024–	Karting (OK)	None
(United States) Lucas Palacio	2024–	Karting (OK-J)	None
(United Kingdom) Will Green	2025–	Karting (OK-J)	None
(France) Jade Jacquet	2026–	F1 Academy; French F4 Championship; Formula 4 CEZ Championship	None
(United Kingdom) Kean Nakamura-Berta	2026–	Formula Regional Middle East Trophy; Formula Regional European Championship	Formula Regional Middle East Trophy (2026)

== Graduates to Formula 1 ==
This list contains the drivers that have graduated to Formula 1 with Williams support. Therefore, drivers who have had support in the past and entered Formula 1 through other means are not included.

Driver	Academy experience		F1 experience with Williams	F1 experience with other teams
Driver	Years	Former series	F1 experience with Williams	F1 experience with other teams
(Canada) Lance Stroll	2016	FIA Formula 3 European Championship (2016)	2017–2018	Racing Point (2019–2020); Aston Martin (2021–)
(Canada) Nicholas Latifi	2019	FIA Formula 2 Championship (2019)	2020–2022	—N/a
(United Kingdom) Jack Aitken	2020–2021	FIA Formula 2 Championship (2020–2021); GT World Challenge Europe (2021)	2020	—N/a
(United States) Logan Sargeant	2021–2022	FIA Formula 2 Championship (2022)	2023–2024	—N/a
(Argentina) Franco Colapinto	2023–2024	FIA Formula 3 Championship (2023); FIA Formula 2 Championship (2023–2024)	2024	Alpine (2025–)

== Former drivers ==
Driver	Years	Series competed
(United Kingdom) Oliver Rowland	2018	Blancpain GT Series Endurance Cup (2018); Formula E (2018–19)
(United Kingdom) Jamie Chadwick	2019–2023	**W Series** (**2019**, **2021**–**2022**); Formula Regional European Championship (2020); Indy NXT (2023)
(United Kingdom) Dan Ticktum	2020–2021	FIA Formula 2 Championship (2020–2021)
(Israel) Roy Nissany	2020–2022	FIA Formula 2 Championship (2020–2022); F3 Asian Championship (2021)
(United Kingdom) Oliver Gray	2022–2023	F4 British Championship (2022); FIA Formula 3 Championship (2023)
(United Kingdom) Zak O'Sullivan	2022–2024	FIA Formula 3 Championship (2022–2023); FIA Formula 2 Championship (2024)
(United States) Lia Block	2024–2025	F1 Academy (2024-2025); Formula Winter Series; Italian F4 Championship (2024); F4 Spanish Championship (2024); Eurocup-4 Spanish Winter Championship (2025)
(Japan) Sara Matsui	2024–2025	Karting
(France) Victor Martins	2025	FIA Formula 2 Championship (2025)

- Championship titles highlighted in **bold**.

== See also ==
- Williams Racing
