= Thibaut Ramaekers =

Belgian racing driver (born 2009)

- Nationality: (Belgium) Belgian
- Born: 19 December 2009 (age 16) Chimay, Hainaut, Belgium

French F4 Championship career
- Debut season: 2026
- Current team: FFSA Academy
- Car number: 79
- Starts: 12
- Wins: 3
- Podiums: 8
- Poles: 0
- Fastest laps: 3
- Best finish: TBD in 2026

Previous series
- 2025: F4 Saudi Arabian
- Statistics up to date as of 2 August 2026.

Thibaut Ramaekers (born 19 December 2009) is a Belgian racing driver who competes in the French F4 Championship.

Born and raised in Chimay, Ramaekers began competitive kart racing aged nine. After a successful karting career—culminating in his victory at the senior World Championship in 2025—Ramaekers graduated to junior formulae.

== Career ==
=== Karting (2019–2025) ===
==== 2019–2023: Career beginnings and European runner-up ====
Ramaekers had a successful karting career, starting with IAME-sanctioned competitions in 2019. From 2019 to 2020, he competed in the X30 Mini class with Eurokarting, finishing third in the IAME Series Benelux and winning it the following year, his first title. He moved up to the X30 Junior category in 2021, finishing third again in the Benelux. He improved to finish runner-up the following year with VDK Racing, as well as finishing fourth in the Winter Cup and third in the Euro Series. He made his international debut that year, ending fourth in the OK-Junior (OK-J) class of the WSK Final Cup. He was selected by the Royal Automobile Club of Belgium (RACB) to compete in the FIA Motorsport Games, where he finished sixth.

Ramaekers experienced his breakout year in 2023, when he won the IAME Winter Cup in the X30 Junior category. In OK-J, he finished third in Champions of the Future, sixth in the WSK Super Master Series, and runner-up to Oleksandr Bondarev in the CIK-FIA European Championship. His first final appearance at the World Championship ended with a retirement. He also made his debut in OK—the senior international class—at the WSK Final Cup and finished third.

==== 2024–2025: World Champion at Kristianstad ====
Ramaekers progressed to compete full-time in OK in 2024, where he finished runner-up to Joe Turney in Champions of the Future and third in the European Championship. At the end of the year, he was invited to the Ferrari Driver Academy World Scouting Camp.

Remaining with VDK Racing for 2025, he was again runner-up in Champions of the Future, this time to Kenzo Craigie. He finished fifth in the European Championship and beat Turney to the World Championship at Kristianstad.

=== Formula 4 (2025–present) ===
==== 2025: Debut in Saudi Arabia ====
In 2025, Ramaekers made his junior formulae debut in the F4 Saudi Arabian Championship. As a rookie in Formula 4 (F4) machinery, he scored consistently between fourth- and sixth-place throughout the season and ended the season fourth overall.

==== 2026: Maiden F4 victories in France ====
In 2026, Ramaekers progressed to the French F4 Championship for his full rookie season. He achieved his maiden F4 podium in the third race of the opening round at Nogaro. A round later at Dijon, he collected another podium in the third race and achieved his maiden victory in the reverse-grid race. The third round and halfway point of the season was at his home race at Spa-Francorchamps, he won the opener and ended second to championship leader Guillaume Bouzar in the final race.

== Karting record ==
=== Karting career summary ===
Season	Series	Team	Position
2019	IAME Euro Series — X30 Mini	Eurokarting	15th
2019	IAME Series Benelux — X30 Mini	Eurokarting	3rd
2019	IAME International Final — X30 Mini	Eurokarting	14th
2020	IAME Winter Cup — X30 Mini	Eurokarting	14th
2020	IAME Euro Series — X30 Mini	Eurokarting	7th
2020	IAME Series Benelux — X30 Mini		1st
2021	IAME Series Benelux — X30 Junior		3rd
2021	IAME Euro Series — X30 Junior	Eurokarting	23rd
2021	IAME Warriors Final — X30 Junior	Eurokarting	NC
2022	IAME Benelux Series – X30 Junior		2nd
2022	IAME Winter Cup — X30 Junior	VDK Racing	4th
2022	IAME Euro Series — X30 Junior	VDK Racing	3rd
2022	IAME Warriors Final — X30 Junior	VDK Racing	31st
2022	Champions of the Future — OK-J	VDK Racing	75th
2022	CIK-FIA European Championship — OK-J	VDK Racing	NC†
2022	WSK Euro Series — OK-J	VDK Racing	33rd
2022	CIK-FIA World Championship — OK-J	VDK Racing	45th
2022	WSK Final Cup — OK-J	VDK Racing	4th
2022	CIK-FIA Academy Trophy	Frédéric Ramaekers	12th
2022	FIA Motorsport Games Sprint Cup — Junior	Team Belgium	6th
2023	Champions of the Future — OK-J	VDK Racing	3rd
2023	IAME Winter Cup — X30 Junior	VDK Racing	1st
2023	CIK-FIA European Championship — OK-J	VDK Racing	2nd
2023	WSK Super Master Series — OK-J	VDK Racing	6th
2023	IAME Euro Series — X30 Junior	VDK Racing	7th
2023	WSK Euro Series — OK-J	VDK Racing	15th
2023	CIK-FIA World Championship — OK-J	VDK Racing	36th
2023	WSK Final Cup — OK	VDK Racing	3rd
2024	IAME Winter Cup — X30 Senior	VDK Racing	25th
2024	WSK Super Master Series — OK	VDK Racing	12th
2024	IAME Euro Series — X30 Senior	VDK Racing	22nd
2024	Champions of the Future — OK	VDK Racing	2nd
2024	CIK-FIA European Championship — OK	VDK Racing	3rd
2024	CIK-FIA World Championship — OK	VDK Racing	13th
2024	IAME Warriors Final — X30 Senior	VDK Racing	17th
2025	IAME Winter Cup — X30 Senior	VDK Racing	6th
2025	WSK Super Master Series — OK	VDK Racing	27th
2025	Champions of the Future — OK	VDK Racing	2nd
2025	CIK-FIA European Championship — OK	VDK Racing	5th
2025	CIK-FIA World Championship — OK	VDK Racing	1st
Source: (Note: Additional references are stated in § Karting (2019–2025).)

^{†} As Ramaekers was a guest driver, he was ineligible for championship points.

=== Complete CIK-FIA results ===
==== Complete CIK-FIA Karting World Championship results ====
Year	Entrant	Class	Circuit	QH	SH	F
2022	VDK Racing	OK-J	(Italy) Sarno	54th	45th	DNQ
2023	VDK Racing	OK-J	(Italy) Franciacorta	13th	10th	Ret (Note: Did not finish, but was classified 36th.)
2024	VDK Racing	OK	(United Kingdom) PF International	11th	7th	13th
2025	VDK Racing	OK	(Sweden) Kristianstad	5th	5th	1st

==== Complete CIK-FIA Karting European Championship results ====
(key) (Races in bold indicate pole position; races in italics indicate fastest lap)

Year	Entrant	Class	1	2	3	4	5	6	7	8	9	10	11	12	Pos	Points
2022	VDK Racing	OK-J	POR; SH	POR; F	ZUE; SH	ZUE; F	KRI; SH	KRI; F	FRN; SH; 15	FRN; F DSQ					NC†	—
2023	VDK Racing	OK-J	VAL; QH; 3	VAL; SH; 2	VAL; F 1	TŘI; QH; 4	TŘI; SH; 3	TŘI; F 4	RØD; QH; 3	RØD; SH; 3	RØD; F 18	**CRE**; **QH**; 1	**CRE**; **SH**; 1	**CRE**; **F** 1	2nd	245
2024	VDK Racing	OK	VAL; QH; 16	VAL; SH; 14	VAL; F 5	ARG; QH; 23	ARG; SH; 30	ARG; F 32‡	SVK; QH; 2	SVK; SH; 1	**SVK**; **F** 1	KRI; QH; 1	**KRI**; **SH**; 3	KRI; F 24	3rd	174
2025	VDK Racing	OK	CAM; QH; 2	CAM; SH; 1	**CAM**; **F** 4	POR; QH; 11	POR; SH; 14	POR; F 6	VIT; QH; 12	VIT; SH; 12	VIT; F 8	RØD; QH; 15	RØD; SH; 17	RØD; F 22‡	5th	144

^{†} As Ramaekers was a guest driver, he was ineligible for championship points.
^{‡} Did not finish, but was classified as he had completed at least one lap.

== Racing record ==
=== Racing career summary ===
Season	Series	Team	Races	Wins	Poles	F/Laps	Podiums	Points	Position
2025	F4 Saudi Arabian Championship	Zahid	10	0	0	0	0	104	4th
2026	French F4 Championship	FFSA Academy	18	3	0	3	9	161	**3rd**

* Season still in progress.

=== Complete F4 Saudi Arabian Championship results ===
(key) (Races in bold indicate pole position; races in italics indicate fastest lap)

Year	Entrant	1	2	3	4	5	6	7	8	9	10	Pos	Points
2025	Zahid	BHR1; 1; 6	BHR1; 2; 4	BHR2; 1; 6	BHR2; 2; 5	JED1; 1; 4	JED1; 2; 6	JED2; 1; 4	JED2; 2; 4	JED3; 1; 4	JED3; 2; 5	4th	104

=== Complete French F4 Championship results ===
(key) (Races in bold indicate pole position; races in italics indicate fastest lap)

Year	Entrant	1	2	3	4	5	6	7	8	9	10	11	12	13	14	15	16	17	18	Pos	Points
2026	FFSA Academy	NOG; 1; 14	NOG; 2; 6	NOG; 3; 2	DIJ; 1; 3	DIJ; 2; 1	DIJ; 3; 7	SPA; 1; 1	SPA; 2; 25†	SPA; 3; 2	MAG; 1; 1	MAG; 2; 3	MAG; 3; 2	LÉD; 1	LÉD; 2	LÉD; 3	LEC; 1	LEC; 2	LEC; 3	2nd*	147*

* Season still in progress.
