= Terry Fullerton =

British racing driver

- Nationality: (United Kingdom) British
- Born: 4 January 1953 (age 73) London, England
- Years active: 1964–1984

Championship titles
- 1977; 1973: Karting European Championship; Karting World Championship

Terry Fullerton (born 4 January 1953) is a British former kart racer and driver manager. Widely known for his rivalry with Ayrton Senna, Fullerton won the Karting World Championship in 1973 with Birel.

Born and raised in London, England, Fullerton initially had ambitions to compete in Formula One prior to his brother's fatal motorcycle road racing accident in 1964, leading him to restrict his career to kart racing. In 1973, Fullerton won the World Championship with Birel, becoming the first British World Champion. Fullerton won the Karting European Championship four years later with Zipkart. From 1978 to 1980, Fullerton competed for DAP as the teammate of Ayrton Senna; their fierce rivalry saw several 1–2 finishes in major competitions. Across his two-decade career, Fullerton was an eight-time British Champion, and four-time European Champion.

Upon retiring from karting in 1984, Fullerton became a driver manager, coaching 2010 junior World Champion and Formula E World Champion Jake Dennis, two-time 24 Hours of Le Mans winner Allan McNish, two-time Indianapolis 500 winner Dan Wheldon, as well as Formula One drivers Paul di Resta and Anthony Davidson.

== Biography ==
"I came to Europe for the first time to compete outside Brazil as a team-mate for Fullerton. He was very experienced, and I enjoyed very much driving with him because he was fast, he was consistent, he was for me a very complete driver. And it was pure driving, pure racing. There wasn't any politics then, right? No money involved either so it was real racing and I have that as a very good memory."

— Ayrton Senna's post-race interview with Mark Fogerty at Adelaide 1993. Question "Who was the opponent that you got the most satisfaction of racing against... past or present?”

Fullerton originally had ambitions to race in Formula 1, but the intensity of his family's grief when his brother, Alec, died in a motorcycle racing accident at Mallory Park in 1964, led him to restrict his career to karts. At 16 years old, Fullerton qualified, but failed to be selected for the British team to compete in the Karting World Championship in 1969. As he was also eligible to race under an Irish licence, he reached the World Championships in 1969 and 1970 but had limited success. In 1971, he began to compete on his British licence and finished 4th in the World Championships that year. He went on to become the first Briton to win the title in 1973.

Fullerton raced for the Italian DAP factory team from 1978 until 1980, where his teammate was Ayrton Senna. After winning the first final at the 1980 World Championship his engine broke down whilst leading the second final and he therefore finished third overall, behind Senna who came second overall. That same year (1980) Fullerton passed Senna on the very last lap of the Final to win the prestigious Champions Cup race at Jesolo (near Venice) in Italy. They were regarded by team manager Angelo Parilla as the best two drivers in the world.

At a press conference at the 1993 Australian Grand Prix, when asked which driver he had the most satisfaction racing against, Senna cited Fullerton. The quote was included in the Senna documentary in 2010.

Fullerton won the British Junior Karting Championship in 1966, 1967 and 1968, with a total of 8 British Championship wins in a career spanning twenty years and devoted solely to karting. He also won the European Championship four times during his career.

Having retired as a racing driver in 1984, Fullerton ran his own race team and then coached up-and-coming racing drivers including: Indycar driver Justin Wilson, Force India driver Paul di Resta, double Indianapolis 500 winner Dan Wheldon, double 24 Hours of Le Mans winner Allan McNish and former F1 driver Anthony Davidson. He regarded McNish and Davidson as his best students.

Fullerton is still active as a manager and driver coach in karting (notably coaching three recent British junior champions - 2010 Jake Dennis, 2011 Callan O'Keeffe & 2013 Jehan Daruvala) and now lives in Melton Mowbray, Leicestershire with his wife and daughter.
