= Jade Jacquet =

French racing driver (born 2009)

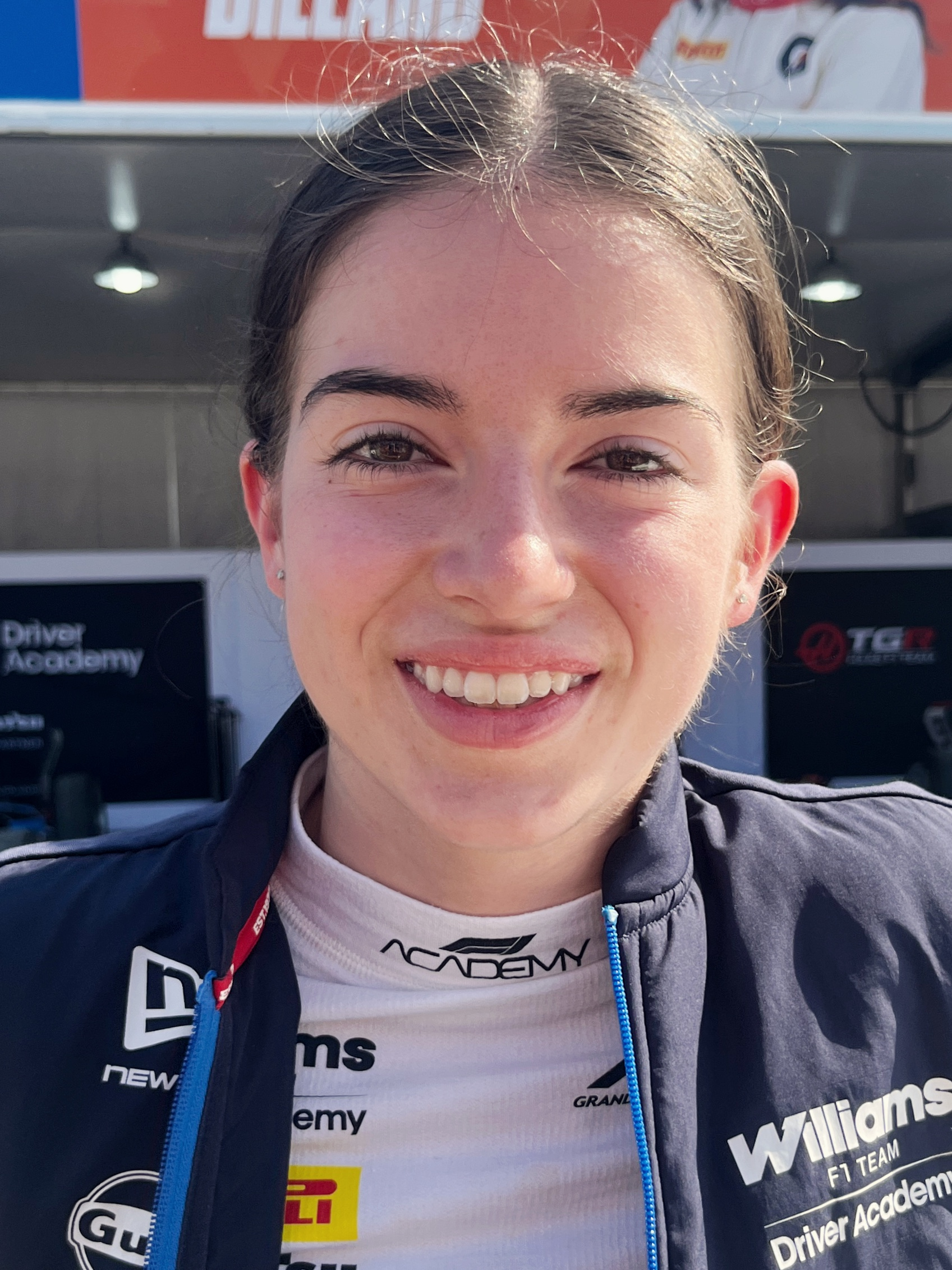
- Jacquet at the 2026 Chinese Grand Prix
- Nationality: (France) French
- Born: 1 December 2009 (age 16) Lestrem, France

F1 Academy career
- Debut season: 2026
- Current team: ART Grand Prix
- Car number: 95
- Starts: 12
- Wins: 0
- Podiums: 0
- Poles: 0
- Fastest laps: 0
- Best finish: TBD in 2026

Previous series
- 2025: French F4
- Statistics up to date as of 13 November 2026.

Jade Jacquet (born 1 December 2009) is a French racing driver who competes in F1 Academy for ART Grand Prix as part of the Williams Driver Academy.

== Career ==
=== Karting (2023–2024) ===
Jacquet began karting in 2023, initially starting out in rental karting before joining National Series Karting later that year. Joining the FFSA Academy-centrally run French Junior Karting Championship the following year, Jacquet finished 14th in that season's standings with a best result of ninth at Mirecourt.

=== Formula 4 (2025–) ===
Stepping up to single-seaters for 2025, Jacquet remained in FFSA Academy-centrally run series, joining the French F4 Championship as one of six girls on the grid. Finishing as high as 12th in the first round at Nogaro, Jacquet then scored a best result of 18th at Dijon before taking her second top-15 of the season with a 14-place finish at Spa. Two top-20 finishes at Magny-Cours then ensued, before scoring a 14th-place finish at Lédenon and a season-best 11th at Le Mans.

In parallel to her F1 Academy campaign, Jacquet returned to the French F4 Championship, albeit as a guest driver. Her second campaign in the series was highlighted by her maiden win in single-seater competition at the penultimate round of the championship at Lédenon, where she became the first woman in series history to win a race, doing so in the reverse-grid race two. During 2026, Jacquet also made a one-off appearance in the Formula 4 CEZ Championship at the Red Bull Ring for Mathilda Racing, scoring a best result of 12th in race two.

=== F1 Academy (2025–) ===
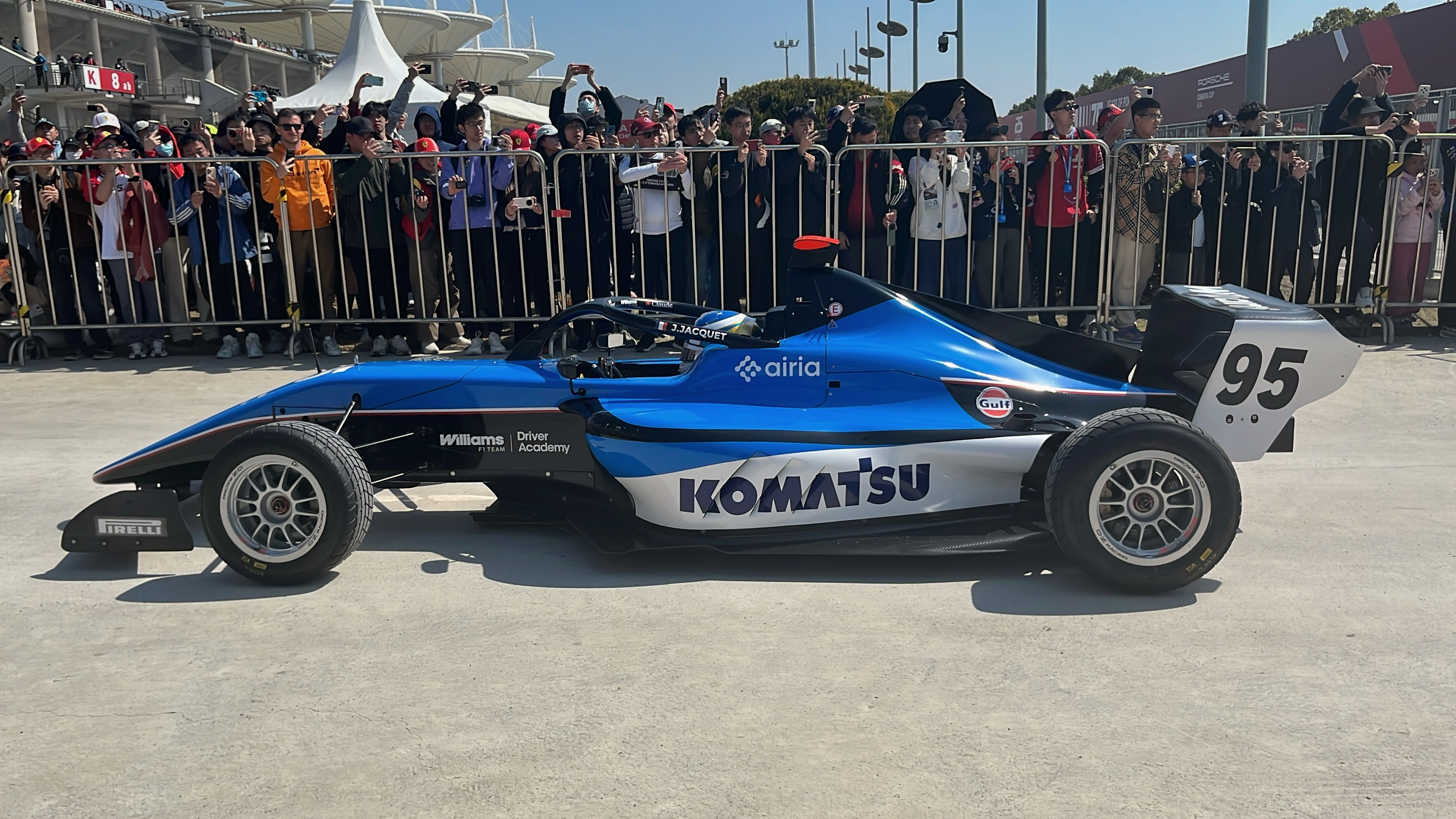
Jacquet driving at the 2026 F1 Academy Shanghai round

In late 2025, Jacquet participated in the F1 Academy rookie test at Navarra, finishing 11th and seventh in the morning and afternoon sessions, respectively.

==== 2026 ====
Towards the end of 2025, it was announced that Jacquet would join the Williams Driver Academy from 2026 onwards. She also joined ART Grand Prix for her maiden season in F1 Academy, racing alongside teammates Lisa Billard and Kaylee Countryman. After finishing 13th on debut at Shanghai, Jacquet finished 12th twice at Montreal, describing it as a 'a good weekend of learning'.

==== 2027 ====
Jacquet will continue with Williams and ART Grand Prix for the 2027 season.

== Personal life ==
Jacquet was born in Lestrem, France. She has said that she looked up to racing drivers like Alain Prost when she was growing up. As a Williams junior, Jacquet receives support from two-time W series champion Jamie Chadwick. Prior to her racing career, Jacquet practiced horse riding, breakdancing, and judo.

== Karting record ==
=== Karting career summary ===
Season	Series	Team	Position
2023	National Series Karting – Nationale	Lehouck Racing	116th
2024	Championnat de France – Junior	FFSA Academy	14th
2024	National Series Karting – Nationale	Lehouck Racing	37th
2024	RMC International Trophy – Junior	Lehouck Racing	62nd

== Racing record ==
=== Career summary ===
Season	Series	Team	Races	Wins	Poles	F/Laps	Podiums	Points	Position
2025	French F4 Championship	FFSA Academy	18	0	0	0	0	0	24th
2026	F1 Academy	ART Grand Prix	14	0	0	0	0	26	13th
2026	French F4 Championship	FFSA Academy	18	1	0	1	1	0	NC†
2026	Formula 4 CEZ Championship	Mathilda Racing	3	0	0	0	0	4	43rd
2027	F1 Academy	ART Grand Prix	0	0	0	0	0	0	TBD

=== Complete French F4 Championship results ===
(key) (Races in bold indicate pole position) (Races in italics indicate fastest lap)

Year	1	2	3	4	5	6	7	8	9	10	11	12	13	14	15	16	17	18	DC	Points
2025	NOG; 1; 22	NOG; 2; 19	NOG; 3; 12	DIJ; 1; 19	DIJ; 2; 24	DIJ; 3; 18	SPA; 1; 16	SPA; 2; 17	SPA; 3; 14	MAG; 1; 20	MAG; 2; 18	MAG; 3; 21	LÉD; 1; 27	LÉD; 2 Ret	LÉD; 3; 14	LMS; 1; 15	LMS; 2; 11	LMS; 3; 26	24th	0
2026	NOG; 1; 12	NOG; 2 Ret	NOG; 3 Ret	DIJ; 1; 12	DIJ; 2; 19	DIJ; 3; 20	SPA; 1; 20	SPA; 2 Ret	SPA; 3; 26	MAG; 1 Ret	MAG; 2; 14	MAG; 3; 17	LÉD; 1; 29	LÉD; 2; 1	LÉD; 3; 13	LEC; 1; 27	LEC; 2; 17	LEC; 3; 13	NC†	0

=== Complete F1 Academy results ===
(key) (Races in bold indicate pole position) (Races in italics indicate fastest lap)

Year	Entrant	1	2	3	4	5	6	7	8	9	10	11	12	13	14	DC	Points
2026	ART Grand Prix	SHA; 1; 13	SHA; 2 Ret	MTL; 1; 12	MTL; 2; 12	MTL; 3; 13	SIL; 1; 18	SIL; 2; 13	ZAN; 1 Ret	ZAN; 2; 11	COA; 1; 10	COA; 2 Ret	COA; 3; 4	LVG; 1; 4	LVG; 2; 6	13th	26

=== Complete Formula 4 CEZ Championship results ===
(key) (Races in bold indicate pole position) (Races in italics indicate fastest lap)

Year	Team	1	2	3	4	5	6	7	8	9	10	11	12	13	14	15	16	17	18	19	20	21	22	23	24	DC	Points
2026	Mathilda Racing	RBR1; 1; 22	RBR1; 2	RBR1; 3; 12	RBR1; 4; 25	SAL; 1	SAL; 2	SAL; 3	SAL; 4	SVK; 1	SVK; 2	SVK; 3	SVK; 4	MOS; 1	MOS; 2	MOS; 3	MOS; 4	BRN; 1	BRN; 2	BRN; 3	BRN; 4	HUN; 1	HUN; 2	HUN; 3	HUN; 4	43rd	4
