= British Kart Championships =

British karting championships organised by Motorsport UK

- Category: Kart racing
- Country: United Kingdom
- Affiliations: Motorsport UK; FIA
- Inaugural season: 2019; 7 years ago
- Classes: Senior pro kart; Junior pro kart; gxuk UK; MiniMax 950; Senior X30; Junior X30; IAME Water Swift; IAME Water Swift Restricted; KZ2; Honda Cadet GX200
- Engine suppliers: BRP Rotax; IAME X30; Honda GX200; KZ2
- Tyre suppliers: Mojo (Rotax); Komet (IAME); LeCont; Vega
- Official website: britishkartchampionships.org

The British Kart Championships (commercially known as the Wera Tools British Kart Championships) are a series of kart racing championships organised by Motorsport UK, the national governing body for four-wheel motorsport in the United Kingdom.

The championships comprise four series; Rotax, IAME, KZ2 and Honda, each featuring multiple classes and awarding British champion titles. With an average of around 500 drivers competing each season across 12 events at circuits throughout the United Kingdom, the British Kart Championships are among the largest karting competitions in the world.

The championships have produced a significant number of drivers who have gone on to compete in Formula One, including Oliver Bearman and Arvid Lindblad.

== History ==
The Motor Sports Association (MSA), the predecessor organisation to Motorsport UK, organised British karting championship titles for several decades. In 2018, the MSA announced that from the 2019 season it would take direct control of the British Kart Championships through a new operating division known as Karting UK Operations, describing the move as designed to "raise the standards and prestige of the pinnacle of UK Karting".

MSA Chairman David Richards described the move as "natural that the MSA should take control of the pinnacle of UK Karting", stating that karting was "a vitally important element of UK motorsport" that needed specific focus. The Association of British Kart Clubs confirmed that the 2019 championships would be organised through Karting UK Operations, with dedicated staff appointed to run the championships from Motorsport UK's headquarters.

In 2021, Motorsport UK announced a broadcasting partnership with Motorsport.tv, enabling live coverage of the championships to reach a global audience alongside other series including the FIA Formula E, FIA World Rally Championship and British Touring Car Championship.

In April 2026, Motorsport UK announced that Sky Sports F1 would broadcast the championships, with every round of the 2026 season shown in an hour-long highlights programme. Motorsport UK described this as the first time karting had been televised on a mainstream channel in over 25 years.

== Organisation ==
The British Kart Championships are organised by Motorsport UK, which is affiliated to the FIA and serves as the national governing body for four-wheel motorsport in the United Kingdom. The championships are listed in the Motorsport UK National Competition Rules as an official British Championship.

The series is commercially known as the Wera Tools British Kart Championships, with German toolmaker Wera serving as title partner. Timing services are provided by Motorsport Timing UK. Live streaming is broadcast by Alpha Live, which has covered the championships since 2016, with events also available via Motorsport.tv.

Motorsport UK operates a karting pathway that leads from arrive-and-drive indoor competition through club and regional racing to the British Kart Championships, which represent the national level of competition.

== Championships and classes ==
There are four championships, each featuring different engine specifications. British champion titles are awarded across all classes.

=== Rotax ===
The Rotax championship is contested using BRP Rotax engines and features four classes: MiniMax 950, MicroMax UK, Junior Rotax and Senior Rotax. Mojo tyres are the official tyre for the Rotax classes. The Rotax Max Challenge International Trophy provides a route into international competition for British Rotax competitors.

=== IAME ===
The IAME championship uses IAME engines and features four classes: IAME Water Swift, IAME Water Swift Restricted, Junior X30 and Senior X30. Komet tyres are the official tyre for the IAME classes. IAME describes the British Kart Championships as "one of the most competitive in the world".

=== KZ2 ===
The KZ2 championship is contested in the KZ2 gearbox class, which uses manual transmission karts and represents the most technically demanding category within the championships.

=== Honda ===
The Honda championship is contested using Honda GX200 engines in the Honda Cadet class. The cadet class is open to drivers aged 8 to 12 and is described by Motorsport UK as providing "a natural progression from commercial karting to club and then top level racing in the UK".

== Circuits ==
The championships are held at a number of circuits across the United Kingdom. The 2026 season calendar includes rounds at Warden Law, PF International, Kimbolton, Whilton Mill and the Silverstone kart track. The PFi circuit in Lincolnshire, home of the Trent Valley Kart Club, has hosted the Motorsport UK Kartmasters Grand Prix, the most prestigious single event in the British karting calendar.

== Media coverage ==
From 2026, the championships are broadcast on Sky Sports F1, with every round shown in an hour-long highlights programme. Motorsport UK described the deal as returning karting to mainstream television for the first time in over 25 years. The championships are additionally streamed live via Motorsport.tv and Alpha Live.

Autosport covered the championships in 2020 when Motorsport UK launched a Karting Esports Championship series in partnership with Motorsport Games and KartSim during the Covid-19 pandemic. Autosport also covered the championships in 2024 in the context of the FIA Motorsport Games, where BKC class winners represented Team UK.

In 2026, BBC News reported on the championship in the context of a 16-year-old driver from Sheffield, Maisy Creed, who became the first female to win the PF International X30 Junior Championship, a circuit championship held at a venue that hosts British Kart Championship rounds. BBC Radio Sheffield also interviewed Creed about her achievement.
