= PF International Kart Circuit =

Kart racing circuit in Lincolnshire, England

Coordinates: 53.0385°N 0.6613°W

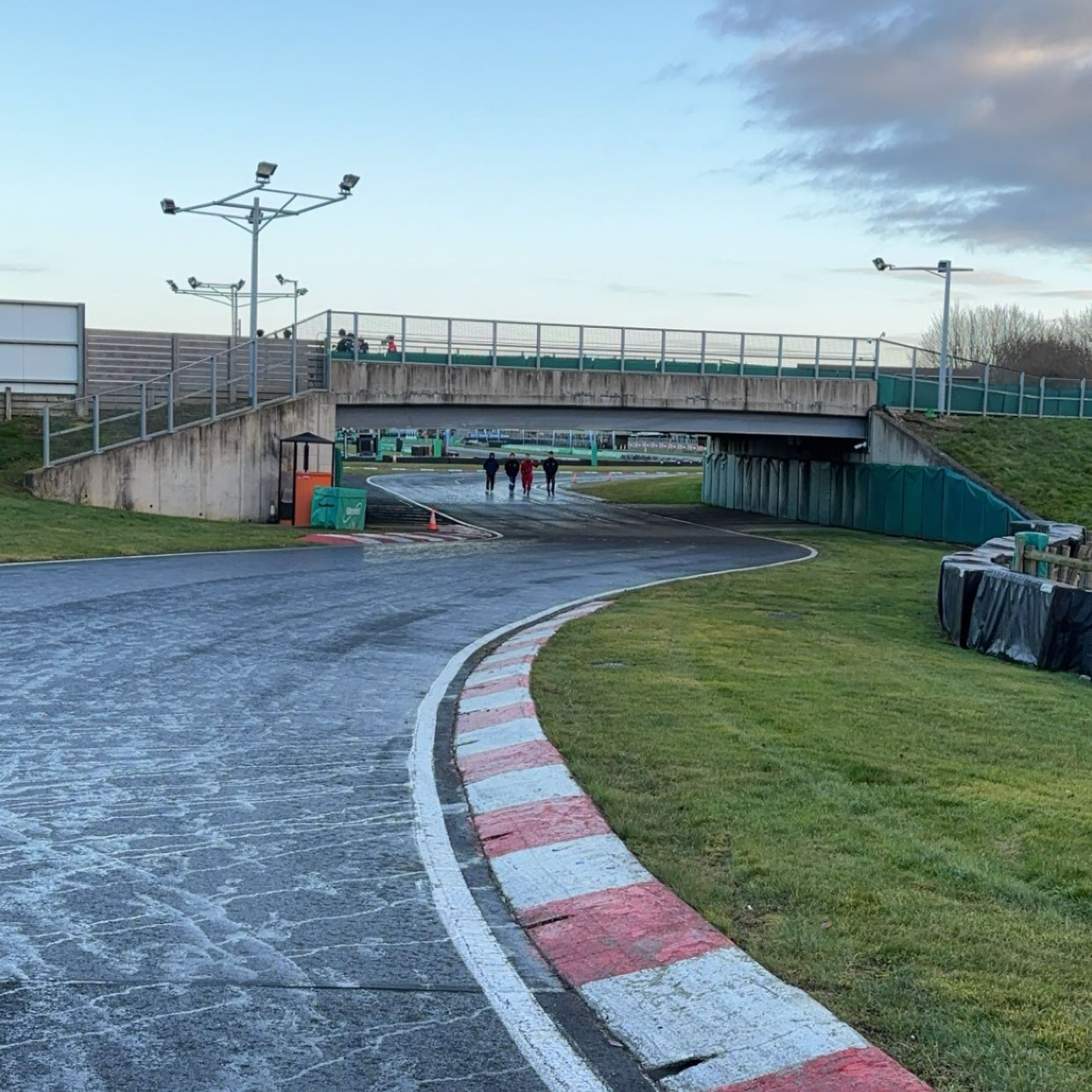
- Location: Brandon, near Grantham, Lincolnshire, England
- Operator: PF International
- Opened: 1994
- Website: https://www.kartpfi.com/
- Length: 1.382 km (0.859 mi)
- Turns: 15

PF International Kart Circuit, also known as PFI or Paul Fletcher International, is an outdoor kart racing circuit at Brandon, near Grantham, Lincolnshire, England. It opened in 1994 and was developed by Paul Fletcher, after whom it is named. The circuit holds a CIK-FIA International A grade licence, awarded in 2011 following a track extension that increased its length to 1,382 metres. It has hosted rounds of the CIK-FIA Karting European Championship and the FIA Karting World Championship, and is the permanent venue for the Kartmasters British Grand Prix.

== History ==
PF International was built by Paul Fletcher and opened in 1994. In 2011 the circuit underwent a major extension: a bridge and flyover section was added, increasing the track length to 1,382 metres and enabling the circuit to obtain a CIK-FIA International A grade licence. It is the only short-circuit kart track in the United Kingdom to hold this grade of licence. In the same year PFI hosted its first CIK-FIA international events.

At the 2012 CIK-FIA Karting Awards ceremony, PF International was presented with the Trophy for the Best Event of the 2012 CIK Season.

== Circuit ==
The international layout is 1,382 metres long with 15 corners. A shorter national layout is also available for club and hire sessions.

== Trent Valley Kart Club ==
Trent Valley Kart Club (TVKC) is a members-only kart racing club based at PF International, established in 1996. The club organises monthly race meetings at the circuit, held on the first Sunday of each month except August, when the slot is taken by the Kartmasters Grand Prix. Other annual events include the Ice Breaker Cup, Winter Warmer Trophy, PF Challenge Cup and Festive Cup. TVKC membership is required for drivers who practise or compete at PF International.

== Major events ==
=== Kartmasters British Grand Prix ===
The Kartmasters British Grand Prix has been held at PF International since its inaugural edition in 1996. It is organised by Trent Valley Kart Club and takes place over a long weekend in August, with qualifying heats on Friday and Saturday leading to Grand Prix finals on Sunday. Winners include Lewis Hamilton, who won the 1996 edition, and George Russell, who won the 2010 edition.

PF International also hosted a round of the Formula Kart Stars championship in 2009. It was at this event that a young George Russell, then racing in the cadet class, met Lewis Hamilton; Russell later recalled the encounter as the moment he resolved to pursue a Formula One career.

=== British Kart Championships ===
PF International is a regular venue on the British Kart Championships calendar. The 2026 season includes rounds at the circuit for the IAME, Honda and Rotax series.

=== CIK-FIA events ===
PF International has hosted multiple CIK-FIA events since receiving its International A grade licence:

- 2012: A round of the CIK-FIA World KF1 Championship, alongside rounds of the European KF2 and KF3 Championships.
- 2013: The opening round of the CIK-FIA World KF Championship and the CIK-FIA International KFJ Super Cup.
- 2014: The final round of the CIK-FIA European KF and KFJ Championships, with 156 entrants from 40 countries.
- 2015: A round of the CIK-FIA European KF Championship.
- 2024: The FIA Karting World Championship for OK and OK-Junior, together with the OK-N World Cup, attracting 262 drivers from 59 nations.

== See also ==
- Kart racing
- British Kart Championships
- Karting World Championship
- Kartmasters British Grand Prix
