= 2026 French F4 Championship =

Formula 4 motor racing series

The 2026 French F4 Championship was the 16th season to run under the guise of the French F4 Championship and the ninth under the FIA Formula 4 regulations.

== Drivers ==
All Mygale M21-F4 cars are run by FFSA Academy.

No.	Driver	Class	Rounds
2	(United States) Truly Adams	G	4
4	(United States) Kyler Cheezum		All
5	(Austria) Clara Stiebleichinger	W	All
6	(France) Arthur Barbe	G	6
7	(France) Arthur Eschalier		All
8	(France) Jimmy Hélias		1–3
9	(Israel) Yuval Rosen		All
10	(France) Lilian Soares		All
11	(Cuba) Isabella Abreu	W	1–2
12	(France) Héloïse Goldberg	W	All
13	(Australia) Lewis Francis		All
14	(France) Lisa Billard	W G	1–4
17	(United States) Maverick McKenna		All
19	(France) Guillaume Bouzar		All
21	(France) Nicolas Pasquier		All
23	(France) Angélina Proenca	W	All
26	(Morocco) Sofia Zanfari	W	All
27	(France) Tom Dussol		All
28	(Italy) Ginevra Panzeri	W G (Note: Ineligible to score points since Round 2 after competing in another championship.)	All
29	(France) Matthéo Dauvergne		All
30	(France) Paul Gleizes		All
42	(France) Oscar Goudchaux		All
44	(United States) Jack Iliffe		All
47	(France) Hugo Herrouin		All
50	(Japan) Kota Tsuchihashi		All
53	(France) Thomas Senecloze		All
55	(France) Walter Schulz	G	4–6
56	(Kenya) Shane Chandaria		All
57	(Canada) Autumn Fisher	W G	All
68	(Poland) Wojciech Woda		All
72	(France) Gabriel Canal	G	6
79	(Belgium) Thibaut Ramaekers	G (Note: Ineligible to score points in Round 6 after testing at Paul Ricard prior to the event.)	All
83	(Netherlands) Annabelle Brian	W	All
88	(France) Jules Avril		All
95	(France) Jade Jacquet	W G	All
99	(Paraguay) Sasha Beisemann		All

Icon	Legend
W	Women's Championship
G	Guest drivers ineligible for Drivers' Championship

- Skye Parker was scheduled to compete, but withdrew prior to the start of the season.

== Race calendar and results ==
French Federation of Automobile Sport published the schedule on 15 December 2025.

Round		Circuit	Date	Pole position	Fastest lap	Winning driver	Women's Championship winner
1	R1	(France) Circuit Paul Armagnac, Nogaro	5 April	(France) Guillaume Bouzar	(France) Guillaume Bouzar	(France) Guillaume Bouzar	(France) Lisa Billard
1	R2	(France) Circuit Paul Armagnac, Nogaro	5 April		(Israel) Yuval Rosen	(Australia) Lewis Francis	(France) Lisa Billard
1	R3	(France) Circuit Paul Armagnac, Nogaro	6 April	(France) Guillaume Bouzar	(France) Matthéo Dauvergne	(France) Matthéo Dauvergne (Note: Guillaume Bouzar originally won the race, but later received a 5-second time penalty for forcing another driver off the track. Matthéo Dauvergne, initially classified second, thus inherited the win.)	(France) Lisa Billard
2	R1	(France) Dijon-Prenois, Prenois	16 May	(France) Guillaume Bouzar	(France) Guillaume Bouzar	(France) Guillaume Bouzar	(Italy) Ginevra Panzeri
2	R2	(France) Dijon-Prenois, Prenois	16 May		(Belgium) Thibaut Ramaekers	(Belgium) Thibaut Ramaekers	(Italy) Ginevra Panzeri
2	R3	(France) Dijon-Prenois, Prenois	17 May	(France) Guillaume Bouzar	(France) Guillaume Bouzar	(France) Guillaume Bouzar	(France) Lisa Billard
3	R1	(Belgium) Circuit de Spa-Francorchamps, Stavelot	20 June	(France) Guillaume Bouzar	(France) Guillaume Bouzar	(Belgium) Thibaut Ramaekers	(Austria) Clara Stiebleichinger
3	R2	(Belgium) Circuit de Spa-Francorchamps, Stavelot	20 June		(France) Guillaume Bouzar	(Israel) Yuval Rosen	(Netherlands) Annabelle Brian
3	R3	(Belgium) Circuit de Spa-Francorchamps, Stavelot	21 June	(France) Guillaume Bouzar	(Belgium) Thibaut Ramaekers	(France) Guillaume Bouzar	(France) Lisa Billard
4	R1	(France) Circuit de Nevers Magny-Cours, Magny-Cours	1 August	(France) Matthéo Dauvergne	(Belgium) Thibaut Ramaekers	(Belgium) Thibaut Ramaekers	(Netherlands) Annabelle Brian
4	R2	(France) Circuit de Nevers Magny-Cours, Magny-Cours	1 August		(France) Matthéo Dauvergne	(United States) Maverick McKenna	(France) Lisa Billard
4	R3	(France) Circuit de Nevers Magny-Cours, Magny-Cours	2 August	(France) Matthéo Dauvergne	(France) Guillaume Bouzar	(France) Guillaume Bouzar	(Canada) Autumn Fisher
5	R1	(France) Circuit de Lédenon, Lédenon	19 September	(Japan) Kota Tsuchihashi	(Japan) Kota Tsuchihashi	(Japan) Kota Tsuchihashi	(Italy) Ginevra Panzeri
5	R2	(France) Circuit de Lédenon, Lédenon	19 September		(France) Jade Jacquet (Note: Jade Jacquet set the fastest lap in Race 2 at Lédenon, but she was ineligible to score points due to competing as a guest driver, so the fastest lap point was awarded to Thibaut Ramaekers.)	(France) Jade Jacquet	(France) Jade Jacquet
5	R3	(France) Circuit de Lédenon, Lédenon	20 September	(Japan) Kota Tsuchihashi	(France) Guillaume Bouzar	(Japan) Kota Tsuchihashi	(France) Jade Jacquet
6	R1	(France) Circuit Paul Ricard, Le Castellet	10 October	(Japan) Kota Tsuchihashi	(France) Matthéo Dauvergne	(France) Matthéo Dauvergne	(Austria) Clara Stiebleichinger
6	R2	(France) Circuit Paul Ricard, Le Castellet	10 October		(France) Matthéo Dauvergne	(France) Tom Dussol	(Austria) Clara Stiebleichinger
6	R3	(France) Circuit Paul Ricard, Le Castellet	11 October	(Japan) Kota Tsuchihashi	(France) Guillaume Bouzar	(Japan) Kota Tsuchihashi	(France) Jade Jacquet

== Championship standings ==
Points are awarded to the top ten classified finishers in races 1 and 3. Race 2, which has its grid formed by reversing the top ten from the qualifying order, awards reduced points as a result, and only to the top eight classified finishers.

Races	Position										Bonus	
Races	1st	2nd	3rd	4th	5th	6th	7th	8th	9th	10th	PP	FL
Races 1 & 3	25	18	15	12	10	8	6	4	2	1	**1**	1
Race 2	10	8	6	5	4	3	2	1			–	1

=== Drivers' Championship ===
Pos	Driver	NOG (France)			DIJ (France)			SPA (Belgium)			MAG (France)			LÉD (France)			LEC (France)			Pts
Pos	Driver	R1	R2	R3	R1	R2	R3	R1	R2	R3	R1	R2	R3	R1	R2	R3	R1	R2	R3	Pts
1	(France) Guillaume Bouzar	**1**	Ret	**3**	**1**	6	**1**	**2**	2	**1**	25†	4	1	2	26	2	28†	3	6	240
2	(Japan) Kota Tsuchihashi	3	16	4	Ret	18	12	4	5	3	2	25	4	**1**	6	**1**	**2**	8	**1**	192
3	(Belgium) Thibaut Ramaekers	14	6	2	3	1	7	1	25	2	1	3	2	8	2	19	4	7	5	161
4	(France) Lilian Soares	6	2	7	4	9	2	14	6	5	6	2	5	3	5	3	29†	5	4	143
5	(France) Hugo Herrouin	2	5	6	2	5	26	3	4	20	5	6	8	5	8	4	18	10	8	119
6	(France) Matthéo Dauvergne	Ret	7	1	Ret	12	Ret	7	Ret	4	**4**	19	**6**	7	Ret	5	1	4	Ret	117
7	(Australia) Lewis Francis	5	1	8	27	10	25	28†	23	9	9	17	30†	6	3	Ret	3	6	2	82
8	(France) Tom Dussol	Ret	Ret	11	13	Ret	4	5	Ret	25	3	Ret	3	28	4	7	7	1	Ret	82
9	(United States) Maverick McKenna	17	12	17	9	13	9	10	3	7	7	1	7	27	9	26†	6	2	3	75
10	(United States) Jack Iliffe	13	Ret	12	5	2	3	6	7	13	Ret	5	13	4	10	Ret	25	14	9	63
11	(Israel) Yuval Rosen	8	3	9	15	22	Ret	22	1	6	10	11	10	10	15	6	8	Ret	7	56
12	(France) Oscar Goudchaux	4	4	5	Ret	4	11	8	DSQ	28†	Ret	9	9	14	11	9	5	20	12	52
13	(France) Jules Avril	10	Ret	13	8	3	6	13	11	14	11	8	12	11	7	15	11	11	DNS	27
14	(Kenya) Shane Chandaria	20	9	10	20	24	5	19	24	27†	8	26	Ret	13	12	8	Ret	9	10	23
15	(France) Nicolas Pasquier	29†	10	26†	11	8	8	9	9	10	DNS	Ret	16	9	13	11	10	Ret	14	15
16	(France) Jimmy Hélias	7	21	15	10	14	10	WD	WD	WD										9
17	(France) Arthur Eschalier	27	13	18	7	11	16	27	19	22	Ret	18	26	21	19	27†	13	Ret	Ret	8
18	(Poland) Wojciech Woda	11	Ret	27†	21	15	23	15	16	29†	14	Ret	19	12	25	12	9	23	Ret	5
19	(France) Thomas Senecloze	18	11	14	23	21	Ret	26	8	12	26†	7	18	30	24	10	14	Ret	15	4
20	(Austria) Clara Stiebleichinger	15	14	Ret	18	27	28	11	13	11	18	13	28	25	14	20	12	16	16	1
21	(Paraguay) Sasha Beisemann	23	22	22	16	17	18	21	21	21	19	22	20	18	27	25	23	12	11	1
22	(Netherlands) Annabelle Brian	24	19	19	25	23	15	17	10	19	12	21	21	23	21	18	16	18	25†	0
23	(France) Paul Gleizes	21	15	28†	22	26	27	16	15	16	Ret	Ret	11	20	28	16	15	15	17	0
24	(United States) Kyler Cheezum	25	20	23	14	Ret	17	Ret	18	15	16	16	24	17	17	23	19	22	19	0
25	(France) Angélina Proenca	19	18	20	17	25	14	23	22	Ret	23	Ret	27	19	20	22	21	Ret	20	0
26	(Morocco) Sofia Zanfari	16	17	Ret	19	20	29†	Ret	17	18	22	15	25	24	22	17	20	Ret	18	0
27	(France) Héloïse Goldberg	22	25†	21	24	28	22	25	26†	23	21	23	29	22	23	24	22	21	22	0
28	(Cuba) Isabella Abreu	28	23	25	28	29	24													0
29	(Canada) Autumn Fisher	26	24†	24	26	30	19	18	12	17	20	24	14	16	29	21	24	Ret	24	0
30	(Italy) Ginevra Panzeri	Ret	DNS	DNS	6	7	21	24	20	24	15	Ret	Ret	15	18	Ret	WD	WD	WD	0
Guest drivers ineligible to score points
—	(France) Jade Jacquet	12	Ret	Ret	12	19	20	20	Ret	26	Ret	14	17	29	1	13	27	17	13	–
—	(France) Lisa Billard	9	8	16	Ret	16	13	12	14	8	13	10	15							–
—	(United States) Truly Adams										17	12	22							–
—	(France) Gabriel Canal																17	13	23	–
—	(France) Walter Schulz										24	20	23	26	16	14	WD	WD	WD	–
—	(France) Arthur Barbe																26	19	21	–
Pos	Driver	NOG (France)			DIJ (France)			SPA (Belgium)			MAG (France)			LÉD (France)			LEC (France)			Pts

Colour	Result
Gold	Winner
Silver	Second place
Bronze	Third place
Green	Points classification
Blue	Non-points classification
Blue	Non-classified finish (NC)
Purple	Retired, not classified (Ret)
Red	Did not qualify (DNQ)
Red	Did not pre-qualify (DNPQ)
Black	Disqualified (DSQ)
White	Did not start (DNS)
White	Withdrew (WD)
White	Race cancelled (C)
Blank	Did not practice (DNP)
Blank	Did not arrive (DNA)
Blank	Excluded (EX)

**Bold** – Pole
Italics – Fastest Lap † — Did not finish but classified

=== Women's Championship ===
Pos	Driver	NOG (France)			DIJ (France)			SPA (Belgium)			MAG (France)			LÉD (France)			LEC (France)			Pts
Pos	Driver	R1	R2	R3	R1	R2	R3	R1	R2	R3	R1	R2	R3	R1	R2	R3	R1	R2	R3	Pts
1	(Austria) Clara Stiebleichinger	3	2	Ret	4	7	9	1	3	2	4	2	7	7	2	4	1	1	2	261
2	(Netherlands) Annabelle Brian	7	5	2	7	5	3	3	1	5	1	5	4	5	5	3	2	3	7†	250
3	(France) Angélina Proenca	5	4	3	3	6	2	6	7	Ret	8	Ret	6	3	4	6	4	Ret	4	212
4	(Morocco) Sofia Zanfari	4	3	Ret	5	4	10†	Ret	5	4	7	4	5	6	6	2	3	Ret	3	196
5	(France) Héloïse Goldberg	6	8†	4	6	8	7	8	8†	6	6	6	8	4	7	7	5	4	5	178
6	(Cuba) Isabella Abreu	9	6	6	9	9	8													43
7	(Canada) Autumn Fisher	8	7†	5	8	10	4	4	2	3	5	7	1	2	8	5	6	Ret	6	23
–	(Italy) Ginevra Panzeri	Ret	DNS	DNS	1	1	6	7	6	7	3	Ret	Ret	1	3	Ret	WD	WD	WD	–
Guest drivers ineligible to score points
–	(France) Lisa Billard	1	1	1	Ret	2	1	2	4	1	2	1	2							–
–	(France) Jade Jacquet	2	Ret	Ret	2	3	5	5	Ret	8	Ret	3	3	8	1	1	7	2	1	–
Pos	Driver	NOG (France)			DIJ (France)			SPA (Belgium)			MAG (France)			LÉD (France)			LEC (France)			Pts
