= Mike Wilson (kart racer) =

British kart racing driver (1959–2026)

Michael Wilson (27 April 1959 – 4 January 2026) was a British kart racer.

== Biography ==
Wilson was born in Barnsley, Yorkshire, England on 27 April 1959.

Wilson's international career began in 1977 with the Zip kart team in Europe. He relocated to Milan at the age of 20, and remained there working with the Birel team.

Throughout his career, Wilson won the Karting World Championship six times (1981, 1982, 1983, 1985, 1988 and 1989).

Wilson retired from racing in 1989, and the following year founded the Rakama Company and focused on building karts.

Wilson died on 4 January 2026, aged 66.
