= Karting World Championship =

International karting championship

FIA Karting World Championship
- Category: Kart racing
- Region: International
- Affiliations: CIK-FIA
- Inaugural season: 1964; 62 years ago
- Classes: OK, OK-J, KZ, KZ2, KZ2-M, OK-N, OKN-J, A&D-S, A&D-J
- Drivers' champion: World Championship; (Belgium) Thibaut Ramaekers; (OK, KR–IAME); (United Kingdom) Noah Baglin; (OK-J, KR–IAME); (Netherlands) Senna van Walstijn; (KZ, Sodi–TM); World Cup; Maksim Orlov; (KZ2, Sodi–TM); (Italy) Manuel Scognamiglio; (OK-N, KR–IAME); (Italy) Gioele Girardello; (OKN-J, Parolin–TM); International Super Cup; (Italy) Angelo Lombardo; (KZ2-M, Maranello–TM)
- Most titles: (United Kingdom) Mike Wilson (6)
- Official website: fiakarting.com

The FIA Karting World Championship, officially known as the Mondokart.com FIA Karting World Championship for sponsorship reasons, is a kart racing competition organised by the CIK-FIA. Hosted annually since 1964, it is widely regarded as the most prestigious karting competition in the world.

Alongside the Karting European Championship, it is one of two major karting competitions sanctioned by the FIA. In recent years, the World Championship has been hosted as a single event, where the European Championship is contested across a season. The championship is notable for being the only FIA World Championship with a female champion: Italian driver Susanna Raganelli in 1966. Two past World Champions have progressed to win the Formula One World Drivers' Championship: Max Verstappen (2013, KZ) and Lando Norris (2014, KF). (Note: Alain Prost (1973, Junior), Fernando Alonso (1996, ICA-J), and Lewis Hamilton (2000, FA) each won World Cups in their respective secondary classes, but are not recognised as World Champions.)

As of 2024, the World Championship is held across three direct-drive and three gearbox classes. The primary direct-drive class is OK, and the primary gearbox class is KZ. Secondary classes or events at the World Championship have traditionally been hosted as the World Cup—which was historically a separate event at Suzuka from 1991 to 2000—or the International Super Cup.

== History ==
The CIK-FIA Karting World Championship was first held in 1964, making it the second-oldest FIA World Championship after the Formula One World Championship.

Before the CIK-FIA began officially sanctioning a World Championship in 1964, the Grand Prix Kart Club of America (GPKCA) held its own World Championship. In December 1959, the GPKCA organised a one-week international meeting in Nassau, Bahamas, offering significant prize money. The American driver Jim Yamane became the first winner. Subsequent GPKCA World Championships adopted a multi-round format and included circuits such as Shenington in the United Kingdom and Pista Rossi in Italy.

The first two CIK-FIA World Championships in 1964 and 1965 were held over one final round, there after the world's best kart drivers competed for the title over an extended weekend, from Thursday to Saturday, including free and qualifying practice sessions, qualification heats, a pre-final and a final were common. The championship is notable for having the only female FIA World Champion with Susanna Raganelli winning the 1966 World Championship.

From 2011 the championship has been disputed over five rounds, each of them in a different country. From 2014 the world championships returned to a single event with one venue each year organizing the CIK-FIA OK and OK Junior World Championships in one weekend and another venue in a different weekend holding the CIK-FIA KZ World Championships together with the CIK-FIA KZ2 Super Cup and the third and final round of the CIK-FIA Karting Academy Trophy. There is a separate CIK-FIA Endurance Championship, normally held each year at Le Mans, France, and there are separate Continental Championships like the CIK-FIA European Championships (OK, OK junior, KZ, KZ2 and Superkart) and the CIK-FIA Asia Pacific Championships. In 1968 CIK-FIA launched the first World Cup for Juniors.

== Categories ==
From 1981 to 1987 the World Championship was raced only with 135 cc Formula K Engines. Before and after the short inaugural return to 100 cc (1988 and 1989 with Formula SuperCent (FS100) a category that anticipated the so-called Formula Super A) the 100 cc direct-drive karts was the prevailing standard. In 2007, a change in regulations introduced the KF1 category carts, 125 cc karts equipped with electric starters, clutch and rpm limiters set at 16000 rpm, to replace the Formula A karts. The 2010 edition was raced with KF2 karts where the engine rpm is limited at 15000 rpm.

The FIA Karting categories at the world championships are now divided into three main families: direct-drive karts, gearbox karts and Superkarts. All these karts have the technology in common of the 2-stroke engine. Since 2016 the new generation of Original Karts (OK) machines have taken over from the old KF engines. The top category OK at the World Championships is available for drivers from 14 years old in the year they participate. The OK Junior category is aimed at drivers aged between 12 and 14 years old. The gearbox categories KZ and KZ2 share the same specification except for chassis and brakes which are open in the KZ World Championship. The Superkart category is the most unusual discipline of Karting because it can only express itself fully on long racing tracks. With its complete bodywork and twin-cylinder 250 cc engines, developing nearly 100 hp (75 kW), these Superkarts are capable of extraordinary performances.

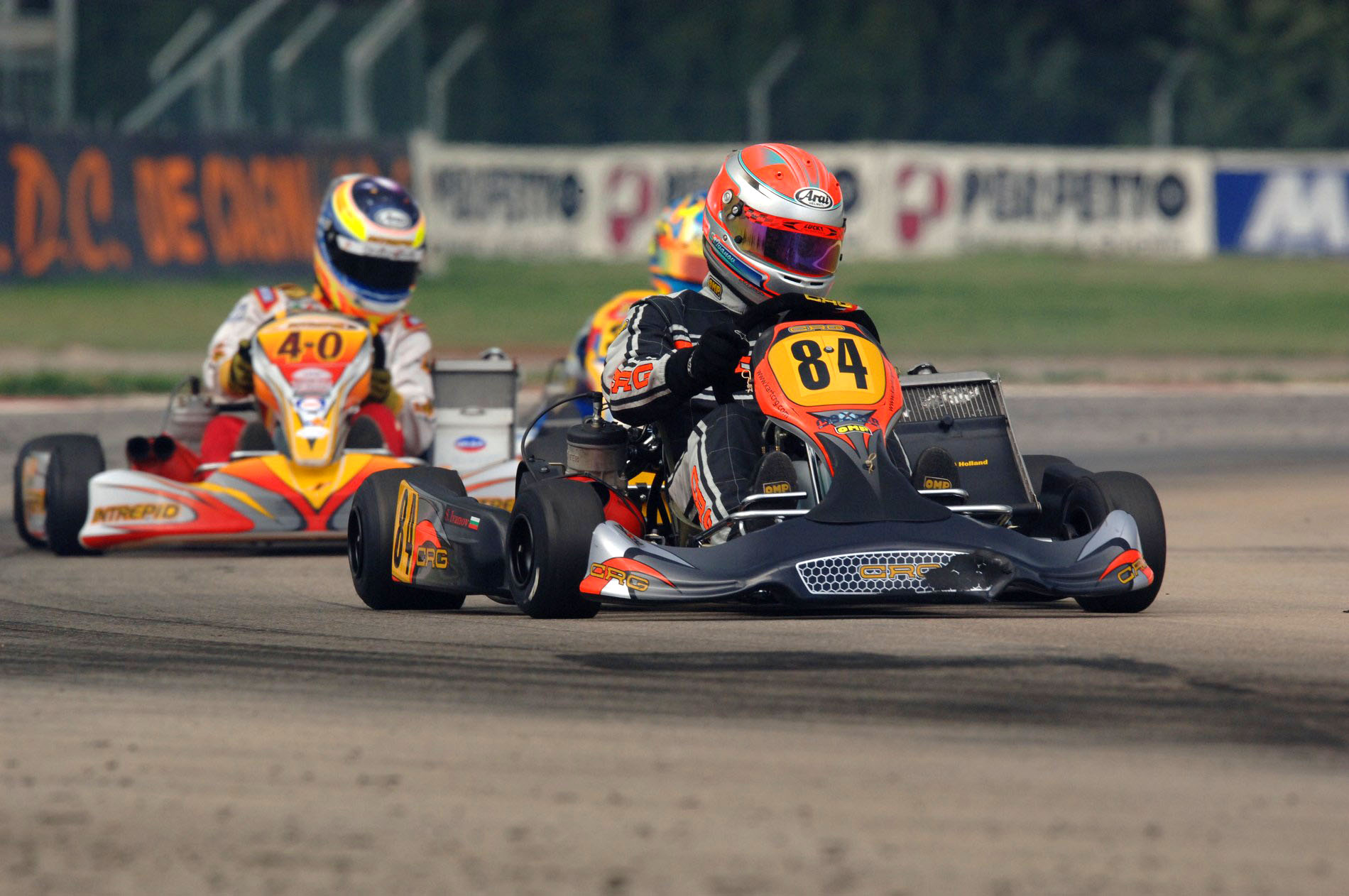
Modern Day Kart Racing

== Karting promotion ==
In 2013 for the first time in its history CIK-FIA called a promoter, WSK Promotion, to perfect the organisation of the major international karting competitions. The Swiss RGMMC Group is now the Official Promoter of the FIA Karting European and World Championships for the period of 2018-2020 (with the exception of Superkart and Endurance). They try increasing the audience for Karting Competitions worldwide, attracting new partners and working closely with ASNs (National Federations), these are the priorities of RGMMC Group. They also develop the communication and media coverage of the events by providing live video viewing during the events and by partnering with Motorsport.tv for broadcast around the world.

From 2022 all the events of the FIA Karting World Championship were sponsored by the website Mondokart.com and the official name of the competition become MONDOKART.COM FIA KARTING WORLD CHAMPIONSHIP

== World Champions ==
Key
Drivers
*	Driver has competed in Formula One		
†	Formula One World Drivers' Champion		
‡	FIA World Champion in an auto racing discipline		
Tyres
B	Bridgestone	L	LeCont
C	Carlisle	M	Maxxis
D	Dunlop	M	MG Tires
G	Goodyear	M	Mojo
K	Komet	V	Vega

=== Senior classes (1964–present) ===
==== Primary senior class (1964–present) ====
Year	World Champion	Chassis	Engine	Tyres	Runner-up	Third place	Circuit	Class	Stroke
1964	(Italy) Guido Sala	Tecno	Parilla	C	(Italy) Ugo Cancellieri	(Italy) Oscar Constantini	(Italy) Pista d'Oro	100cc	
1965	(Italy) Guido Sala (2)	Tecno	BM	C	(West Germany) Werner Ihle	(Netherlands) Toine Hezemans	(Italy) Pista d'Oro	100cc	
1966	(Italy) Susanna Raganelli	Tecno	Parilla	C	(Sweden) Leif Engström	(Sweden) Ronnie Peterson*	(Denmark) Copenhagen	100cc	
1967	(Switzerland) Edgardo Rossi	Birel	Parilla	C	(Belgium) François Goldstein	(Italy) Giulio Pernigotti	3 (Note: The 1967 World Championship was a three-venue series held at: 1. Vevey; 2. Düsseldorf; 3. Monaco.)	100cc	
1968	(Sweden) Thomas Nilsson	Robardie	BM	C	(Italy) Giulio Pernigotti	(United Kingdom) Mickey Allen	3 (Note: The 1968 World Championship was a three-venue series held at: 1. Vevey; 2. Jesolo; 3. Rye House.)	100cc	
1969	(Belgium) François Goldstein	Robardie	Parilla	C	(United Kingdom) Mickey Allen	(United Kingdom) Paul Fletcher	3 (Note: The 1969 World Championship was a three-venue series held at: 1. Vevey; 2. Rye House; 3. Villacoublay.)	100cc	
1970	(Belgium) François Goldstein (2)	Robardie	Parilla	C	(United Kingdom) David Ferris	(South Africa) Carl-Heinz Peters	(France) Thiverval	100cc	
1971	(Belgium) François Goldstein (3)	Taifun	Parilla	G	(South Africa) Carl-Heinz Peters	(United Kingdom) Mickey Allen	(Italy) Turin	100cc	
1972	(Belgium) François Goldstein (4)	Taifun	Parilla	G	(West Germany) Helmut Brandhofer	(United Kingdom) Mark Steeds	(Sweden) Kalmar	100cc	
1973	(United Kingdom) Terry Fullerton	Birel	Komet	G	(Switzerland) Erik Hagenbuch	(South Africa) Carl-Heinz Peters	(Belgium) Nivelles	100cc	
1974	(Italy) Riccardo Patrese*	Birel	Komet	G	(United States) Eddie Cheever*	(Belgium) François Goldstein	(Portugal) Estoril	100cc	
1975	(Belgium) François Goldstein (5)	BM	BM	G	(Italy) Elio de Angelis*	(United Kingdom) Alan Lane	(France) Le Castellet	100cc	
1976	(Italy) Felice Rovelli	BM	BM	4S	(Sweden) Leif Larsson	(West Germany) Martin Bott	(West Germany) Hagen	100cc	
1977	(Italy) Felice Rovelli (2)	BM	BM	B	(United Kingdom) Mickey Allen	(Sweden) Leif Larsson	(Italy) Parma	100cc	
1978	(United States) Lake Speed	Birel	Parilla	B	(Austria) Toni Zöserl	(Sweden) Lars Forsman	(France) Le Mans	100cc	
1979	(Netherlands) Peter Koene	DAP	DAP	D	(Brazil) Ayrton Senna†	(Netherlands) Harm Schuurman	(Portugal) Estoril	100cc	
1980	(Netherlands) Peter de Bruijn	Hutless	Parilla	B	(Brazil) Ayrton Senna†	(United Kingdom) Terry Fullerton	(Belgium) Nivelles	100cc	
1981	(United Kingdom) Mike Wilson	Birel	Komet	D	(Sweden) Lars Forsman	(Italy) Ruggero Melgrati	(Italy) Parma	FK	135cc
1982	(United Kingdom) Mike Wilson (2)	Birel	Komet	D	(Sweden) Lars Forsman	(Sweden) Thomas Danielsson	(Sweden) Kalmar	FK	135cc
1983	(United Kingdom) Mike Wilson (3)	Birel	Komet	D	(Sweden) Lars Forsman	(France) Marc Boulineau	(France) Le Mans	FK	135cc
1984	(Denmark) Jörn Haase	Kalì	Komet	D	(Italy) Giuseppe Bugatti	(Sweden) Lars Forsman	(West Germany) Liedolsheim	FK	135cc
1985	(United Kingdom) Mike Wilson (4)	Kalì	Komet	D	(Italy) Giuseppe Bugatti	(Denmark) Jörn Haase	(Italy) Parma	FK	135cc
1986	(Brazil) Augusto Ribas	Birel	Komet	D	(United States) Ken Kroeger	(United States) Jason Kennedy	(United States) Jacksonville	FK	135cc
1987	(Italy) Giampiero Simoni	PCR	PCR	B	(Denmark) Tom Kristensen‡	(Italy) Maurizio Mediani	(Italy) Jesolo	FK	135cc
1988	(United Kingdom) Mike Wilson (5)	CRG	Komet	D	(Italy) Giampiero Simoni	(Italy) Maurizio Mediani	(France) Laval	FK	135cc
1989	(United Kingdom) Mike Wilson (6)	CRG	Komet	D	(Italy) Fabrizio De Simone	(Belgium) Marc Goossens	(France) Valence	FK	135cc
1990	(Denmark) Jan Magnussen*	CRG	Rotax	B	(Italy) Fabrizio De Simone	(Belgium) Alain Corbiau	(Italy) Jesolo	FK	100cc
1991	(Italy) Jarno Trulli*	All Kart	Parilla	D	(Italy) Massimiliano Orsini	(Denmark) Kenneth Kristensen	(France) Le Mans	FK	100cc
1992	(Italy) Danilo Rossi	CRG	Rotax	D	(Italy) Alessandro Manetti	(Switzerland) Max Busslinger	(Italy) Ugento	FK	100cc
1993	(Italy) Nicola Gianniberti	Haase	Rotax	D	(Italy) Jarno Trulli*	(Italy) Massimiliano Orsini	(France) Laval	FSA	100cc
1994	(Italy) Alessandro Manetti	CRG	Rotax	V	(Belgium) Guy de Nies	(Italy) Daniele Parrilla	(Argentina) Córdoba	FSA	100cc
1995	(Italy) Massimiliano Orsini	Hutless	Italsistem	B	(Italy) Davide Forè	(Sweden) Johnny Mislijevic	(France) Valence	FSA	100cc
1996	(Sweden) Johnny Mislijevic	Tony Kart	Vortex	B	(Japan) Takao Matsuya	(Italy) Alessandro Manetti	(Italy) Lonato	FSA	100cc
1997	(Italy) Danilo Rossi (2)	CRG	CRG	D	(Italy) Alessandro Manetti	(Italy) Giorgio Pantano*	(France) Salbris	FSA	100cc
1998	(Italy) Davide Forè	Tony Kart	Vortex	B	(Italy) Massimiliano Orsini	(Italy) Sauro Cesetti	(Italy) Ugento	FSA	100cc
1999	(Italy) Danilo Rossi (3)	CRG	CRG	D	(Italy) Ronnie Quintarelli	(Italy) Giorgio Pantano*	(Belgium) Mariembourg	FSA	100cc
2000	(Italy) Davide Forè (2)	Tony Kart	Vortex	B	(France) Franck Perera	(Finland) Heikki Kovalainen*	(Portugal) Braga	FSA	100cc
2001	(Italy) Vitantonio Liuzzi*	CRG	Maxter	B	(Italy) Sauro Cesetti	(Italy) Davide Forè	5 (Note: The 2001 FSA World Championship was a five-venue series held at: 1. Montreal; 2. Salbris; 3. Sarno; 4. Mariembourg; 5. Kerpen.)	FSA	100cc
2002	(Netherlands) Giedo van der Garde*	CRG	Maxter	B	(Italy) Ronnie Quintarelli	(Italy) Davide Forè	5 (Note: The 2002 FSA World Championship was a five-venue series held at: 1. Mariembourg; 2. Alahärmä; 3. Braga; 4. Salbris; 5. La Conca.)	FSA	100cc
2003	(New Zealand) Wade Cunningham	CRG	Maxter	B	(France) Arnaud Kozlinski	(United Kingdom) Ben Hanley	(Italy) Sarno	FA	100cc
2004	(Italy) Davide Forè (3)	Tony Kart	Vortex	B	(France) Arnaud Kozlinski	(Netherlands) Bas Lammers	(Italy) La Conca	FA	100cc
2005	(United Kingdom) Oliver Oakes	Gillard	Parilla	B	(United Kingdom) Jon Lancaster	(Italy) Davide Forè	(Portugal) Braga	FA	100cc
2006	(Italy) Davide Forè (4)	Tony Kart	Vortex	B	(Denmark) Michael Christensen‡	(Italy) Sauro Cesetti	(France) Angerville	FA	100cc
2007	(Italy) Marco Ardigò	Tony Kart	Vortex	B	(United Kingdom) Gary Catt	(Denmark) Nikolaj Bøllingtoft	(Belgium) Mariembourg	KF1	125cc
2008	(Italy) Marco Ardigò (2)	Tony Kart	Vortex	B	(Czech Republic) Libor Toman	(United Kingdom) Gary Catt	(Italy) La Conca	KF1	125cc
2009	(France) Arnaud Kozlinski	CRG	Maxter	B	(Finland) Aaro Vainio	(United Kingdom) Ben Hanley	(Macau) Coloane	SKF	125cc
2010	(Netherlands) Nyck de Vries*‡	Zanardi	Parilla	D	(United Kingdom) Jordan Chamberlain	(Denmark) Nicolaj Møller Madsen	(Spain) Zuera	KF2	125cc
2011	(Netherlands) Nyck de Vries*‡ (2)	Zanardi	Parilla	B	(United Kingdom) Alexander Albon*	(Italy) Flavio Camponeschi	5 (Note: The 2011 KF1 World Championship was a five-venue series held at: 1. Wackersdorf; 2. Zuera; 3. Genk; 4. Sarno; 5. Suzuka.)	KF1	125cc
2012	(Italy) Flavio Camponeschi	Tony Kart	Vortex	B	(United Kingdom) Tom Joyner	(Italy) Felice Tiene	2 (Note: The 2012 KF1 World Championship was a two-venue series held at: 1. Suzuka; 2. Coloane.)	KF1	125cc
2013	(United Kingdom) Tom Joyner	Zanardi	TM	V	(United Kingdom) Ben Hanley	(Netherlands) Max Verstappen†	2 (Note: The 2013 KF World Championship was a two-venue series held at: 1. PF International; 2. Sakhir.)	KF	125cc
2014	(United Kingdom) Lando Norris†	FA Kart	Vortex	D	(Russia) Nikita Mazepin*	(India) Jehan Daruvala	(France) Essay	KF	125cc
2015	(Poland) Karol Basz	Kosmic	Vortex	V	(United Kingdom) Jordon Lennox-Lamb	(Denmark) Nicklas Nielsen	(Italy) La Conca	KF	125cc
2016	(Spain) Pedro Hiltbrand	CRG	Parilla	V	(Poland) Karol Basz	(Italy) Felice Tiene	(Bahrain) Sakhir	OK	125cc
2017	(United Kingdom) Danny Keirle	Zanardi	Parilla	L	(Spain) David Vidales	(Finland) Juho Valtanen	(United Kingdom) PF International	OK	125cc
2018	(Italy) Lorenzo Travisanutto	KR	Parilla	B	(Germany) Hannes Janker	(Italy) Luigi Coluccio	(Sweden) Kristianstad	OK	125cc
2019	(Italy) Lorenzo Travisanutto (2)	KR	Parilla	L	(United Kingdom) Taylor Barnard	(United Kingdom) Harry Thompson	(Finland) Alahärmä	OK	125cc
2020	(United Kingdom) Callum Bradshaw	Tony Kart	Vortex	L	(United Kingdom) Joe Turney	(Spain) Pedro Hiltbrand	(Portugal) Portimão	OK	125cc
2021	(Finland) Tuukka Taponen	Tony Kart	Vortex	M	(Italy) Luigi Coluccio	(United Kingdom) Arvid Lindblad*	(Spain) Campillos	OK	125cc
2022	(Brazil) Matheus Morgatto	KR	Parilla	M	(Finland) Tuukka Taponen	(Sweden) Oscar Pedersen	(Italy) Sarno	OK	125cc
2023	Kirill Kutskov (Note: Following the Russian invasion of Ukraine in 2022, the FIA banned competitors from racing under the Russian and Belarusian flags, allowing them to compete neutrally.)	KR	IAME	M	(Netherlands) René Lammers	(Japan) Kean Nakamura-Berta	(Italy) Franciacorta	OK	125cc
2024	(United Kingdom) Ethan Jeff-Hall	CRG	IAME	M	(United Kingdom) Joe Turney	(United Kingdom) Matthew Higgins	(United Kingdom) PF International	OK	125cc
2025	(Belgium) Thibaut Ramaekers	KR	IAME	M	(United Kingdom) Joe Turney	(Ukraine) Lev Krutogolov	(Sweden) Kristianstad	OK	125cc
2026	(Netherlands) Dean Hoogendoorn	Parolin	TM Kart	M	(United Kingdom) Henry Domain	(Canada) Ilie Tristan Crisan	(Italy) La Conca	OK	125cc

==== Secondary senior class (1988–2000) ====
Year	World Champion	Chassis	Engine	Tyres	Runner-up	Third place	Circuit	Class	Stroke
1988	(France) Emmanuel Collard	Kalì	Rotax	D	(Italy) Fabrizio De Simone	(France) Eddy Coubard	(France) Laval	FS100	100cc
1989	(Denmark) Gert Munkholm	PCR	Atomik	B	(Italy) Massimiliano Orsini	(Netherlands) Mike Hezemans	(France) Valence	FS100	100cc
1990	(Italy) Danilo Rossi	CRG	Rotax	D	(France) Xavier Pompidou	(Italy) Gianluca de Lorenzi	(Italy) Jesolo	FA	100cc
1991	(Italy) Alessandro Manetti	Tony Kart	Rotax	B	(United Kingdom) Guy Smith	(Portugal) João Barbosa	(France) Le Mans	FA	100cc
1992	(Italy) Nicola Gianniberti	Tony Kart	Rotax	V	(Denmark) Nicolai Olsen	(Italy) Andrea Candiracci	(Italy) Ugento	FA	100cc
1993	(France) David Terrien	Sodi	Rotax	V	(Belgium) Guy de Nies	(Finland) Risto Virtanen	(France) Laval	FA	100cc
1994	(Italy) Marco Barindelli	Haase	Rotax	V	(Japan) Koji Yamanishi	(France) Frédéric Blin	(Argentina) Córdoba	FA	100cc
1995	(Brazil) Gastão Fráguas	Tony Kart	Italsistem	B	(United Kingdom) Jenson Button†	(Finland) Kimmo Liimatainen	(France) Valence	FA	100cc
1996	(France) Jean-Christophe Ravier	Tony Kart	Vortex	B	(Denmark) Nicolas Kiesa*	(Italy) Thomas Pichler	(Italy) Lonato	FA	100cc
1997	(Australia) James Courtney	Tony Kart	Vortex	B	(Japan) Kosuke Matsuura	(France) Guillaume Renaux	(France) Salbris	FA	100cc
1998	(Brazil) Ruben Carrapatoso	Tony Kart	Vortex	B	(Italy) Marino Spinozzi	(Brazil) André Nicastro	(Italy) Ugento	FA	100cc
1999	(France) Franck Perera	Tony Kart	Vortex	B	(Netherlands) Ronny Schmitz	(Netherlands) Nelson van der Pol	(Belgium) Mariembourg	FA	100cc
2000	(United Kingdom) Colin Brown	Top-Kart	Parilla	B	(Monaco) Clivio Piccione	(France) Loïc Duval‡	(Portugal) Braga	FA	100cc

=== Junior class (2010–present) ===
A junior class has been contested at the World Championship since 2010, when it was established as the CIK-FIA U18 World Championship. In 2013, KF-Junior (KF-J) joined the senior KF class at the World Championship and have been held concurrently since.

Year	World Champion	Chassis	Engine	Tyres	Runner-up	Third place	Circuit	Class	Stroke
2010	(United Kingdom) Jake Dennis‡	Top-Kart	Single-design	L	(Finland) Matias Köykkä	(United Kingdom) Adam Stirling	3 (Note: The 2010 U18 World Championship was a three-venue series held at: 1. Wackersdorf; 2. Aragón; 3. Val d'Argenton.)	U18	125cc
2011	(United Kingdom) Matthew Graham	Zanardi	Single-design	L	(Finland) Pyry Ovaska	(France) Anthoine Hubert	3 (Note: The 2011 U18 World Championship was a three-venue series held at: 1. Ortona; 2. Essay; 3. Sarno.)	U18	125cc
2012	(United Kingdom) Henry Easthope	Sodi	Single-design	L	(Monaco) Charles Leclerc*	(France) Anthoine Hubert	3 (Note: The 2012 U18 World Championship was a three-venue series held at: 1. Braga; 2. Angerville; 3. Sakhir.)	U18	125cc
2013	(Italy) Alessio Lorandi	Tony Kart	Parilla	L	(Italy) Leonardo Pulcini	(Russia) Robert Shwartzman	2 (Note: The 2013 KF-Junior World Championship was a two-venue series held at: 1. Sarno; 2. Sakhir.)	KF-J	125cc
2014	(United Kingdom) Enaam Ahmed	FA Kart	Vortex	V	(Germany) Mick Schumacher* (Note: Mick Schumacher competed under the pseudonym "Mick Junior" in 2014.)	(Venezuela) Mauricio Baiz	(France) Essay	KF-J	125cc
2015	(United States) Logan Sargeant*	FA Kart	Vortex	L	(France) Clément Novalak	(Brazil) Caio Collet	(Italy) La Conca	KF-J	125cc
2016	(France) Victor Martins	Kosmic	Parilla	V	(Spain) David Vidales	(France) Théo Pourchaire	(Bahrain) Sakhir	OK-J	125cc
2017	(United Kingdom) Dexter Patterson	Exprit	TM	L	(United Kingdom) Chris Lulham	(United Kingdom) Harry Thompson	(United Kingdom) PF International	OK-J	125cc
2018	(France) Victor Bernier	Kosmic	Parilla	V	(Italy) Gabriele Minì	(Brazil) Gabriel Bortoleto*	(Sweden) Kristianstad	OK-J	125cc
2019	(Netherlands) Thomas ten Brinke	FA Kart	Vortex	L	(Brazil) Rafael Câmara*	(Colombia) Alejandro Saavedra	(Finland) Alahärmä	OK-J	125cc
2020	(United Kingdom) Freddie Slater	Kosmic	Vortex	M	(Finland) Tuukka Taponen	(United Kingdom) Harry Burgoyne Jr.	(Portugal) Portimão	OK-J	125cc
2021	(Japan) Kean Nakamura-Berta	Exprit	TM	M	(United Kingdom) Freddie Slater	(Russia) Anatoly Khavalkin	(Spain) Campillos	OK-J	125cc
2022	(Thailand) Enzo Tarnvanichkul	Tony Kart	Vortex	V	(Hungary) Ádám Hideg	(Poland) Jan Przyrowski	(Italy) Sarno	OK-J	125cc
2023	(Belgium) Dries Van Langendonck	Exprit	TM	V	(Spain) Christian Costoya	(Sweden) Scott Lindblom	(Italy) Franciacorta	OK-J	125cc
2024	(United Kingdom) Kenzo Craigie	KR	IAME	M	(Australia) James Anagnostiadis	(Netherlands) Rocco Coronel	(United Kingdom) PF International	OK-J	125cc
2025	(United Kingdom) Noah Baglin	KR	IAME	M	(Italy) Valerio Viapiana	(Netherlands) Dean Hoogendoorn	(Sweden) Kristianstad	OK-J	125cc
2026	(Belgium) Antoine Venant	KR	IAME	M	(Spain) Daniel Mirón Lorente	(Mexico) Miguel Manzano	(Italy) La Conca	OK-J	125cc

=== Gearbox class (1983–present) ===
Year	World Champion	Chassis	Engine	Tyres	Runner-up	Third place	Circuit	Class	Stroke
1983	(Italy) Gianni Mazzola	Birel	Balen	D			(Italy) Magione	FC	125cc
1984	(Italy) Gabriele Tarquini‡	Kalì	Balen	D			(Sweden) Jönköping	FC	125cc
1985	(Italy) Piermario Cantoni	Kalì	Balen	D	(Italy) Roberto Calcinari	(Netherlands) Frank ten Wolde	(France) Laval	FC	125cc
1986	(Italy) Fabrizio Giovanardi	Tony Kart	Pavesi	B	(Italy) Pietro Sassi	(Italy) Luigi Dizzari	(Italy) Pomposa	FC	125cc
1987	(Italy) Alessandro Piccini	DAP	Pavesi	V	(Italy) Vincenzo Sospiri	(Italy) Donato Cicconetti	(Italy) Magione	FC	125cc
1988	(Sweden) Peter Rydell	All Kart	Pavesi	D	(West Germany) Andreas Siemens	(Italy) Richardo Parabelli	(Hungary) Kecskemét	FC	125cc
1989	(Italy) Gianluca Giorgi	Kalì	Kalì	D			(Czechoslovakia) Olomouc	FC	125cc
1990	(Italy) Alessandro Piccini (2)	Birel	Pavesi	B	(Italy) Donato Cicconetti	(Italy) Gianluca Paglicci	(France) Laval	FC	125cc
1991	(Italy) Alessandro Piccini (3)	Birel	Pavesi	D	(Italy) Riccardo Tarabelli	(Italy) Danilo Rossi	(Italy) Parma	FC	125cc
1992	(Italy) Danilo Rossi	CRG	Pavesi	D	(Italy) Jarno Trulli*	(Sweden) Anders Gabrielsson	(Belgium) Mariembourg	FC	125cc
1993	(Italy) Alessandro Piccini (4)	Kalì	Pavesi	D	(Italy) Gianluca Beggio	(Japan) Tsuyoshi Takahashi	(Italy) Val Vibrata	FC	125cc
1994	(Italy) Jarno Trulli*	Tony Kart	Pavesi	D	(Sweden) Anders Gabrielsson	(Sweden) Fredrik Wallberg	(Poland) Bydgoszcz	FC	125cc
1995	(Italy) Gianluca Beggio	Biesse	TM	V	(Italy) Andrea Belicchi	(Italy) Alessandro Manetti	(Italy) Val Vibrata	FC	125cc
1996	(Italy) Gianluca Beggio (2)	Biesse	TM	B	(Italy) Giuseppe Palmieri	(Sweden) Johnny Mislijevic	(France) Salbris	FC	125cc
1997	(Italy) Gianluca Beggio (3)	Birel	TM	B	(Italy) Danilo Rossi	(Italy) Sauro Cesetti	(Italy) Ugento	FC	125cc
1998	(Italy) Gianluca Beggio (4)	Birel	TM	B	(Italy) Alessandro Manetti	(Italy) Nico Biasuzzi	(United States) Concord	FC	125cc
1999	(Italy) Francesco Laudato	Birel	TM	D	(Italy) Danilo Rossi	(France) Christophe Vassort	(France) Carole	FC	125cc
2000	(Italy) Gianluca Beggio (5)	Birel	TM	B	(Italy) Ennio Gandolfi	(Italy) Vitantonio Liuzzi*	(Belgium) Mariembourg	FC	125cc
2001 – 2012	Demoted to World Cup status, see § Palmarès, World Cup								
2013	(Netherlands) Max Verstappen†	CRG	TM	B	(Monaco) Charles Leclerc*	(United Kingdom) Jordon Lennox-Lamb	(France) Varennes	KZ	125cc
2014	(Italy) Marco Ardigò	Tony Kart	Vortex	B	(Italy) Flavio Camponeschi	(Belgium) Rick Dreezen	(Italy) Sarno	KZ	125cc
2015	(Netherlands) Jorrit Pex	CRG	TM	B	(Italy) Paolo De Conto	(France) Arnaud Kozlinski	(France) Le Mans	KZ	125cc
2016	(Italy) Paolo De Conto	CRG	TM	V	(France) Anthony Abbasse	(Italy) Marco Ardigò	(Sweden) Kristianstad	KZ	125cc
2017	(Italy) Paolo De Conto (2)	CRG	TM	V	(France) Anthony Abbasse	(United Kingdom) Ben Hanley	(Germany) Wackersdorf	KZ	125cc
2018	(Czech Republic) Patrik Hájek	Kosmic	Vortex	L	(Belgium) Rick Dreezen	(Italy) Fabian Federer	(Belgium) Genk	KZ	125cc
2019	(Netherlands) Marijn Kremers	Birel ART	TM	B	(Italy) Riccardo Longhi	(Netherlands) Bas Lammers	(Italy) Lonato	KZ	125cc
2020	(France) Jérémy Iglesias	Formula K	TM	V	(Netherlands) Marijn Kremers	(Netherlands) Bas Lammers	(Italy) Lonato	KZ	125cc
2021	(Sweden) Noah Milell	Tony Kart	Vortex	M	(Italy) Lorenzo Camplese	(Netherlands) Jorrit Pex	(Sweden) Kristianstad	KZ	125cc
2022	(Sweden) Viktor Gustavsson	CRG	TM	L	(Sweden) Noah Milell	(France) Jérémy Iglesias	(France) Le Mans	KZ	125cc
2023	(Italy) Paolo Ippolito	KR	IAME	L	(Sweden) Viktor Gustavsson	(Netherlands) Stan Pex	(Germany) Wackersdorf	KZ	125cc
2024	(Italy) Giuseppe Palomba	Sodi	TM	D	(Netherlands) Senna van Walstijn	(Spain) Pedro Hiltbrand	(Portugal) Portimão	KZ	125cc
2025	(Netherlands) Senna van Walstijn	Sodi	TM	L	(Sweden) Viktor Gustavsson	(Italy) Danilo Albanese	(Italy) Franciacorta	KZ	125cc

=== Superkart class (1983–1995) ===
Year	World Champion	Chassis	Engine	Tyres	Runner-up	Third place	Circuit	Class	Stroke
1983	(United Kingdom) Martin Hines	Zipkart	Rotax	B	(Norway) Torgjer Kleppe	(United Kingdom) Brian Heerey	3 (Note: The 1983 FE World Championship was a three-venue series held at: 1. Jyllands-Ringen; 2. Silverstone; 3. Le Mans–Bugatti.)	FE	250cc
1984	(Sweden) Lennart Bohlin	Zipkart	Rotax	B	(France) Éric Gassin	(United Kingdom) Reg Gange	4 (Note: The 1984 FE World Championship was a four-venue series held at: 1. Zwartkop; 2. Silverstone; 3. Nürburgring; 4. Le Mans–Bugatti.)	FE	250cc
1985	(Denmark) Poul Petersen	PVP	Rotax	B	(United Kingdom) Derek Rodgers	(Netherlands) Perry Grondstra	3 (Note: The 1985 FE World Championship was a three-venue series held at: 1. Le Mans–Bugatti; 2. Nürburgring; 3. Silverstone.)	FE	250cc
1986	(South Africa) Wade Nelson	Dino	Rotax	B	(Sweden) Lennart Bohlin	(United Kingdom) Tim Parrott	3 (Note: The 1986 FE World Championship was a three-venue series held at: 1. Le Mans–Bugatti; 2. Silverstone; 3. Nürburgring.)	FE	250cc
1987	(France) Éric Gassin	Nissag	Rotax	B	(Sweden) Lennart Bohlin	(Sweden) Bobo Westman	3 (Note: The 1987 FE World Championship was a three-venue series held at: 1. Silverstone; 2. Nürburgring; 3. Le Mans–Bugatti.)	FE	250cc
1988	(Denmark) Poul Petersen (2)	PVP	Rotax	B	(United Kingdom) Berny Roberts	(United Kingdom) Ian Shaw	(France) Le Mans–Bugatti	FE	250cc
1989	(United Kingdom) Tim Parrott	Anderson	Rotax	B	(United Kingdom) Martin Hines	(France) Éric Gassin	(France) Le Mans–Bugatti	FE	250cc
1990	(United Kingdom) Tim Parrott (2)	Anderson	Rotax	B	(United Kingdom) Phil Glencross	(France) Éric Gassin	(France) Le Mans–Bugatti	FE	250cc
1991	(United Kingdom) Martin Hines (2)	Zipkart	Rotax	B	None	(United Kingdom) Dave Buttigieg	3 (Note: The 1991 FE World Championship was a three-venue series held at: 1. Assen; 2. Knockhill; 3. Le Mans–Bugatti.)	FE	250cc
1991	(Netherlands) Perry Grondstra	Zipkart	Rotax	B	None	(United Kingdom) Dave Buttigieg	3	FE	250cc
1992	(United Kingdom) Martin Hines (3)	Zipkart	Rotax	B	(United Kingdom) Simon Cullen	(United Kingdom) Chris Stoney		FE	250cc
1993	(Netherlands) Perry Grondstra (2)	Zipkart	Rotax	B				FE	250cc
1994	(Netherlands) Perry Grondstra (3)	Zipkart	Rotax	B				FE	250cc
1995	(United Kingdom) Trevor Roberts	PVP	Rotax	B				FE	250cc

== Palmarès, World Cup ==
=== Senior classes ===
==== KF1 World Cup (2007–2010) ====
Year	Winner	Chassis	Engine	Tyre	Second place	Third place	Location	Class
2007	(Italy) Marco Ardigo	Tony Kart	Vortex	B	(Japan) Tatsuya Hattori	(United Kingdom) Gary Catt	(Japan) Suzuka	KF1
2008	(Italy) Davide Fore	Maranello	Maxter	B	(Czech Republic) Libor Toman	(Italy) Sauro Cesetti	(Japan) Suzuka	KF1
2009	(Belgium) Yannick de Brabander	Intrepid	TM	B	(France) Manuel Renaudie	(France) Arnaud Kozlinski	(Japan) Suzuka	SKF&KF1
2010	(United Kingdom) Oliver Rowland	Zanardi	Parilla	B	(Japan) Shota Kiyohara	(Netherlands) Nyck de Vries	(Japan) Suzuka	SKF&KF1

==== KF2 World Cup (2007–2012) ====
Year	Winner	Chassis	Engine	Tyre	Second place	Third place	Location	Class
2007	(United Kingdom) Michael Ryall	Birel	TM	D	(United Kingdom) Scot Jenkins	(Italy) Flavio Camponeschi	(Belgium) Mariembourg	KF2
2008	(United Kingdom) Oliver Rowland	Tony Kart	Vortex	D	(Czech Republic) Zdenek Groman	(France) Loic Reguillon	(Italy) La Conca	KF2
2009	(Portugal) David da Luz	Zanardi	Parilla		(Belgium) Stoffel Vandoorne	(Malaysia) Mitchell Gilbert	(Spain) Alcaniz	KF2
2010	Not held							
2011	(Italy) Loris Spinelli	Tony Kart	Vortex	V	(Denmark) Christian Sorensen	(Italy) Antonio Giovinazzi	(Italy) Sarno	KF2
2012	(Italy) Felice Tiene	CRG	BMB	V	(Netherlands) Max Verstappen	(United Kingdom) Jordon Lennox-Lamb	(Spain) Zuera	KF2

==== OK-N World Cup (2024–present) ====
Year	Winner	Chassis	Engine	Tyres	Runner-up	Third place	Circuit
2024	(South Korea) Kyuho Lee	LN	IAME	M	(Hungary) Zsombor Kovács	(Brazil) Heitor Dall'Agnol Farias	(United Kingdom) PF International
2025	(Italy) Manuel Scognamiglio	KR	IAME	M	(Italy) Danny Carenini	(Argentina) Nicolás Fuca	(Italy) Cremona
2026	To be determined						

=== Junior classes ===
==== Junior World Cup (1968–1991) ====
Year	Winner	Chassis	Engine	Tyre	Second place	Third place	Location	Class
1968	(Italy) Amedeo Pacitto	Tecno	BM	Carlise			(Italy) Milano Pista Rosa	CIK-FIA Junior World Cup
1969	(Sweden) D. Carlsson	Ilhe	Sirio				(Sweden) Kalmar	CIK-FIA Junior World Cup
1970	(United Kingdom) Alan Lane	Barlotti	Komet					CIK-FIA Junior World Cup
1971	(Belgium) Marc Wouters	Taifun	Parilla				(Germany) Horrem	CIK-FIA Junior World Cup
1972	(United Kingdom) Derek Bliss	Zip	Komet				(Denmark) Vojens	CIK-FIA Junior World Cup
1973	(France) Alain Prost	Birel	Parilla				(Netherlands) Oldenzaal	CIK-FIA Junior World Cup
1974	(Italy) Felice Rovelli	Birel	Parilla				(England) Rye House, Hoddesdon	CIK-FIA Junior World Cup
1975	(Switzerland) Adrian Wepfer	BM	BM				(West Germany) Fulda	CIK-FIA Junior World Cup
1976	(Italy) Andrea de Cesaris	Sirio	Sirio				(Switzerland) Wohlen	CIK-FIA Junior World Cup
1977	(Italy) Paolo Bandinelli	Sirio	Sirio				(France) Le Creusot	CIK-FIA Junior World Cup
1978	(Italy) Stefano Modena	Birel	Parilla				(Luxembourg) Mondercange	CIK-FIA Junior World Cup
1979	(Switzerland) Thomas Glauser	Birel	Parilla				(Italy) Fano	CIK-FIA Junior World Cup
1980	(West Germany) Bernd Schneider	Birel	Parilla		(Netherlands) Michel Vacirca	(Sweden) Thomas Danielsson	(France) Le Creusot	CIK-FIA Junior World Cup
1981	(Netherlands) Michel Vacirca	AllKart	PCR				(West Germany) Kerpen	CIK-FIA Junior World Cup (ICA)
1982	(Italy) Romeo Deila	Birel	PCR				(Italy) Parma	CIK-FIA Junior World Cup (ICA)
1983	(Netherlands) Frank van Eglem	Tecno Kart	Parilla				(West Germany) Kerpen	CIK-FIA Junior World Cup (ICA)
1984	(Italy) Andrea Gilardi	Birel	PCR		(France) Yvan Muller	(Italy) Roberto Colciago	(France) Laval	CIK-FIA Junior World Cup (ICA)
1985	(Italy) Andrea Gilardi	Birel	PCR		(West Germany) Michael Schumacher	(United Kingdom) Allan McNish	(France) Le Mans	CIK-FIA Junior World Cup (ICA)
1986	(Italy) Fabrizio de Simone	Birel	Parilla				(Italy) Jesolo	CIK-FIA Junior World Cup (ICA)
1987	(Denmark) Jan Magnussen	Tony Kart	Parilla				(France) Laval	CIK-FIA Junior World Cup (ICA)
1988	(Italy) Gianluca Malandrucco	CRG	Parilla				(Italy) Pomposa	CIK-FIA Junior World Cup (ICA)
1989	(Denmark) Jan Magnussen	Tony Kart	Rotax				(Spain) Saragozza	CIK-FIA Junior World Cup (ICA)
1990	(France) Jérémie Dufour	Sodikart	Dino		(Italy) Jarno Trulli		(Italy) Lonato	CIK-FIA Junior World Cup (ICA)
1991	(France) Sébastien Philippe	Sodikart	Dino		(Italy) Alessio Falchi	(France) David Terrien	(France) Laval	CIK-FIA Junior World Cup (ICA)

==== Five Continents Cup (1992–1996) ====
Year	Winner	Chassis	Engine	Tyre	Second place	Third place	Location	Class
1992	(Italy) Bruno Balocco	Mike 1	Parilla		(Finland) Mikael Santavirta	(Netherlands) René van Ameyden	(Sweden) Gothenburg	CIK-FIA Junior World Cup (ICA)
1993	(Italy) Ennio Gandolfi	Kali	Parilla		(Sweden) Johan Agrell	(Italy) Danilo Miotto		CIK-FIA Junior World Cup (ICA)
1994	(Italy) Giorgio Pantano	CRG	Rotax		(Germany) Alexander Müller	(Belgium) Philip Cloostermans		CIK-FIA Junior World Cup (ICA)
1995	(Australia) James Courtney	Tony Kart	Vortex	B	(Italy) Vitantonio Liuzzi	(Italy) Alessandro Piccolo	(Portugal) Braga	CIK-FIA Junior World Cup (ICA)
1996	(Spain) Fernando Alonso	Mach 1	Parilla	B	(Netherlands) Jimmy van der Ende	(Austria) Riko Fürtbauer	(Belgium) Genk	CIK-FIA Junior World Cup (ICA)

==== KF3 World Cup (2009–2012) ====
Year	Winner	Chassis	Engine	Tyre	Second place	Third place	Location	Class
2009	(Italy) Giuliano Maria Niceta	Top Kart	Vortex	Vega	(United Kingdom) Jake Dennis	(France) Pierre Gasly	(Italy) Sarno-Napoli	KF3 CIK-FIA World Cup
2010	(United Kingdom) Alexander Albon	Intrepid	TM	D	(Netherlands) Max Verstappen	(South Africa) Callan O'Keeffe	(Portugal) Braga	KF3 CIK-FIA World Cup
2011	(Monaco) Charles Leclerc	Intrepid	TM	Vega	(South Africa) Callan O'Keeffe	(United Kingdom) Harrison Scott	(Italy) Sarno-Napoli	KF3 CIK-FIA World Cup
2012	(Italy) Luca Corberi	Kosmic	Vortex	Vega	(United Kingdom) Callum Ilott	(Denmark) Slavko Ivanovic	(Spain) Zuera	KF3 CIK-FIA World Cup

==== OKN-J World Cup (2025–present) ====
Year	Winner	Chassis	Engine	Tyres	Runner-up	Third place	Circuit
2025	(Italy) Gioele Girardello	Parolin	TM	L	(Italy) Michele Orlando	(Switzerland) Albert Tamm	(Italy) Cremona
2026	(Italy) Niccolò Perico	TBD	TBD	TBD	(Italy) Luigi D'Ascoli	(United States) John McLellan	(Italy) Viterbo

=== Gearbox classes ===
==== S-ICC World Cup (2003–2006) ====
Year	Winner	Chassis	Engine	Tyre	Location	Class	Stroke
2003	(Netherlands) Robert Dirks	Birel	TM	Vega	(France) Carole	Super ICC	125 cc
2004	(Italy) Ennio Gandolfi	Birel	TM	Vega	(Belgium) Mariembourg	Super ICC	125 cc
2005	(Italy) Francesco Laudato	Birel	TM	Vega	(Italy) Sarno	Super ICC	125 cc
2006	(Italy) Davide Forè	Tony Kart	Vortex	Vega	(Belgium) Mariembourg	Super ICC	125 cc

==== KZ1 World Cup (2007–2012) ====
Year	Winner	Chassis	Engine	Tyre	Location	Class	Stroke
2007	(Belgium) Jonathan Thonon	CRG	Maxter	D	(Italy) Sarno	KZ1	125 cc
2008	(Belgium) Jonathan Thonon	CRG	Maxter	D	(France) Varennes	KZ1	125 cc
2009	(Belgium) Jonathan Thonon	CRG	Maxter	D	(Italy) Sarno	KZ1	125 cc
2010	(Netherlands) Bas Lammers	Intrepid	TM	D	(Portugal) Braga	KZ1	125 cc
2011	(Belgium) Jonathan Thonon	CRG	Maxter	D	(Belgium) Genk	KZ1	125 cc
2012	(Netherlands) Bas Lammers	Praga	Parilla	B	(Italy) Sarno	KZ1	125 cc

==== KZ2 World Cup (2022–present) ====
Year	Winner	Chassis	Engine	Tyre	Second place	Third place	Class
2022	(France) Arthur Carbonnel	CRG	TM	LeCont	(Italy) Cristian Bertuca	(United Kingdom) Arvid Lindblad	KZ2 Supercup
2023	(Germany) Niels Tröger	Maranello	TM	LeCont	(Jamaica) Alex Powell	(Romania) Daniel Vasile	KZ2 Supercup
2024	(Italy) Cristian Bertuca	Birel	TM	D	(Brazil) Matheus Morgatto	(Finland) Paavo Tonteri	KZ2 Supercup

== Palmarès, International Super Cup ==
=== KZ2 International Super Cup (2011–2021) ===
Year	Winner	Chassis	Engine	Tyre	Second place	Third place	Class
2013	(France) Dorian Boccolacci	Energy Corse	TM	B	(France) Alexandre Arrue	(New Zealand) Daniel Bray	KZ2 Supercup
2014	(Netherlands) Ryan Van Der Burgt	DR	Modena	B	(Italy) Lorenzo Camplese	(Netherlands) Menno Paauwe	KZ2 Supercup
2015	(France) Thomas Laurent	Tony Kart	Vortex	LeCont	(Sweden) Joel Johansson	(Italy) Alberto Cavalieri	KZ2 Supercup
2016	(Spain) Pedro Hiltbrand	CRG	Maxter	Vega	(Italy) Fabian Federer	(Sweden) Benjamin Törnqvist Persson	KZ2 Supercup
2017	(Italy) Alex Irlando	Sodikart	TM	B	(Sweden) Benjamin Törnqvist Persson	(Italy) Riccardo Longhi	KZ2 Supercup
2018	(Italy) Matteo Viganò	Tony Kart	Vortex	B	(New Zealand) Daniel Bray	(Spain) David Vidales	KZ2 Supercup
2019	(France) Émilien Denner	Sodikart	TM	B	(Spain) David Vidales	(Sweden) Emil Skärås	KZ2 Supercup
2020	(Italy) Simone Cunati	Birel	TM	Vega	(Italy) Giuseppe Palomba	(Italy) Giacomo Pollini	KZ2 Supercup
2021	(Italy) Lorenzo Travisanutto	Parolin	TM	MG	(Netherlands) Senna van Walstijn	(Germany) David Trefilov	KZ2 Supercup

== See also ==
- Karting European Championship
- FIA Motorsport Games
- Commission Internationale de Karting
- Fédération Internationale de l'Automobile
- Kart racing
- List of kart racing championships
- List of FIA championships
