= List of international kart racing champions =

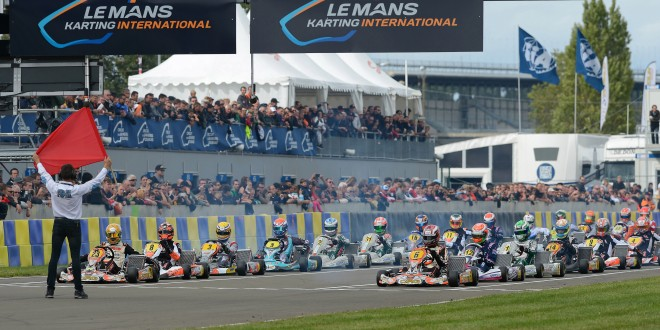
The KZ pre-final of the Karting World Championship in 2015 at Le Mans, which was won by Jorrit Pex

There have been 740 champions in kart racing classes sanctioned by the Commission Internationale de Karting (CIK-FIA) since 2007, when KF and KZ regulations were introduced to international competition. OK replaced KF as the senior regulation in 2016, also when OK-Junior (OK-J) replaced its KF-Junior (KF-J) counterpart for drivers under the age of 15. KZ—formerly known as KZ1—and KZ2 have remained the gearbox classes throughout this span. Academy and 60 Mini have since been introduced as junior categories by the CIK-FIA in 2010 and 2020, respectively. Young drivers typically progress to junior formulae before reaching the gearbox classes—referred to as "the domain of factory teams and professional drivers" by the CIK-FIA—as the minimum age for progression has decreased throughout the 21st century.

IAME classes also feature prominently on the international kart racing calendar, (Note: Including the International IAME Games (2007–2022), IAME Euro Series (2016–present), and IAME Warrior Final (2021–present).) as well as the Rotax Max Challenge (2000–present) and ROK Cup (2003–present), (Note: See list of kart racing championships.) which operate under manufacturer-designated classes approved by the CIK-FIA. The inaugural editions of several competitions pre-date this list: Karting World Championship (1964), Karting European Championship (1970), Trofeo delle Industrie (1971), Karting Asia-Pacific Championship (1981), Andrea Margutti Trophy (1990), CIK-FIA Viking Trophy (1990), Monaco Kart Cup (1995), South Garda Winter Cup (1996), and WSK International Series (2006). The Trofeo delle Industrie, Andrea Margutti Trophy, and South Garda Winter Cup—all Italian competitions—were each granted international status by the CIK-FIA.

The superkart category also pre-dates the list, reaching the international stage as early as 1976. Several national championships have held international classes and are not included. (Note: Including the Italian ACI Karting Championship, Deutsche Kart-Meisterschaft, British Kart Championships, and SKUSA SuperNationals.) Marco Ardigò won a record 22 international titles from 2007—including three World and three European Championships—until his retirement in 2019, (Note: Ardigò won a total of 25 international titles, three of which were before 2007—including two FA European Championships in 2005 and 2006.) followed by Max Verstappen's 13 titles from 2010 to 2013. Since 2007, Italian drivers have won 201 titles—97 of which are in the gearbox classes—with British drivers on 113, and Dutch drivers on 72. Three women feature on this list: Beitske Visser, (Note: WSK Master Series, KZ2, 2010) Marta García, (Note: Academy Trophy, 2015; Trofeo delle Industrie, KF-Junior, 2015) and Luna Fluxá. (Note: Champions of the Future, OK-N, 2024)

== By class ==
Key
| * | Driver has competed in Formula One |
| † | Formula One World Drivers' Champion |
| ‡ | FIA World Champion in an auto racing discipline |

=== Senior classes ===
CIK-FIA senior class timeline in kart racing
| Category | 1964– | 1970s | 1980s | 1990s | 2000s | | 2010s | | 2020s |
| 100 cc | | | | | | | | | |
| Formula | | | | | | | | | |
|---|---|---|---|---|---|---|---|---|---|
| Formula | | | FK | | | | | | |
| Formula | | | ICA | | | | | | |
| Formula | | | FS100 | FA | | | | | |
| Formula | | | | FSA | | | | | |
| KF | | | | | | | | | |
| KF | | | | | KF1 | SKF | KF1 | | |
| KF | | | | | KF2 | | | KF | |
| OK | | | | | | | | | |
| OK | | | | | | | | | OK |
| OK | | | | | | | | | OK-N |
| Category | | | | | | | | | |
| Category | 1964– | 1970s | 1980s | 1990s | 2000s | | 2010s | | 2020s |

Key
| Both World and European titles held. |
| Only World title held. |
| Only European title held. |
| Only active in other international competitions. |
| World Championship held. |
| Both World Championship and World Cup / International Super Cup held. |
| Only World Cup / International Super Cup held. |

==== KF1 / Super-KF (2007–2012) ====
KF1—replaced by Super-KF (SKF) from 2009 to 2010—was the primary senior class in CIK-FIA competition from 2007 to 2012 for drivers aged 15 and over. SKF differed from KF1 with non-homologated engines, whilst retaining the free chassis, brakes, and tyres. It hosted the World Championship in each year of its existence bar 2010, where it was replaced by KF2.

KF1 / Super-KF (2007–2012)
| Year | Competition | | | | | | Year |
| Year | World Championship | World Cup | European Championship | Asia-Pacific Championship | WSK World Series (Note: Previously the WSK International Series from 2006 to 2009.) | South Garda Winter Cup | Year |
|---|---|---|---|---|---|---|---|
| 2007 | (Italy) Marco Ardigò | (Italy) Marco Ardigò | (Italy) Marco Ardigò | (Italy) Marco Ardigò | Not held | (Denmark) Michael Christensen‡ | 2007 |
| 2008 | (Italy) Marco Ardigò | (Italy) Davide Forè | (Italy) Marco Ardigò | (Italy) Marco Ardigò | (Italy) Sauro Cesetti | (Netherlands) Yannick de Brabander | 2008 |
| 2009 | (France) Arnaud Kozlinski | (Netherlands) Yannick de Brabander | (Finland) Aaro Vainio | Not held | (France) Arnaud Kozlinski | (United Kingdom) Gary Catt | 2009 |
| 2010 | Not held | (United Kingdom) Oliver Rowland | | Not held | (France) Armand Convers | (Czech Republic) Libor Toman | 2010 |
| 2011 | (Netherlands) Nyck de Vries*‡ | | | (Japan) Daiki Sasaki | | Not held | 2011 |
| 2012 | (Italy) Flavio Camponeschi | | | Not held | | Not held | 2012 |

Additional international titles that have been held in KF1 / SKF since 2007:

Additional titles in KF1 / SKF
| Year | Competition | Driver |
|---|---|---|
| 2007 | Andrea Margutti Trophy | (United Kingdom) Gary Catt |
| 2008 | Andrea Margutti Trophy | (United Kingdom) Gary Catt |
| 2010 | WSK Euro Series | (France) Armand Convers |
| 2010 | Macau International Kart Grand Prix | (Italy) Marco Ardigò |
| 2011 | WSK Euro Series | (Netherlands) Nyck de Vries*‡ |

==== KF / KF2 (2007–2015) ====
KF2 was the secondary senior class from 2007 to 2012 for drivers aged 15 and over, before becoming the primary class in 2013 as KF. It hosted the World Championship four times: 2010, 2013, 2014, and 2015.

KF / KF2 (2007–2015)
| Year | Competition | | | | | | | | | | | | | Year |
| Year | World Championship | World Cup (Note: Years held as an International Super Cup: 2013.) | European Championship | Asia-Pacific Championship | WSK Final Cup (Note: Previously the WSK Nations Cup in 2010.) | WSK Euro Series | WSK Super Master Series (Note: Previously the WSK Master Series from 2010 to 2013.) | WSK World Series | Viking Trophy | Bridgestone Cup (Note: European Final) | South Garda Winter Cup | Andrea Margutti Trophy | Trofeo delle Industrie (Note: Held as the Torneo delle Industrie in 2007 and 2008.) | Year |
|---|---|---|---|---|---|---|---|---|---|---|---|---|---|---|
| 2007 | Not held | (United Kingdom) Michael Ryall | (United Kingdom) Will Stevens* | (United Kingdom) Will Stevens* | | | | (Netherlands) Yannick de Brabander | (Sweden) Jesper Wernersson | (France) Anthony Abbasse | (Netherlands) Yannick de Brabander | (Germany) Burkhard Maring | (Germany) Burkhard Maring | 2007 |
| 2008 | Not held | (United Kingdom) Oliver Rowland | (Italy) Flavio Camponeschi | (United Kingdom) Jack Harvey | | | | (Italy) Flavio Camponeschi | (Sweden) Joel Johansson | (United Kingdom) Robert Foster-Jones | (United Kingdom) Robert Foster-Jones | (Czech Republic) Zdeněk Groman | (Germany) Andre Hauke | 2008 |
| 2009 | Not held | (Portugal) David da Luz | (United Kingdom) Jordan Chamberlain | (Italy) Felice Tiene | | | | (Canada) Ben Cooper | (Denmark) Kevin Munkholm | (Denmark) Nicolaj Møller Madsen | (France) Brandon Maïsano | (France) Brandon Maïsano | (Italy) Nicola Torri | 2009 |
| 2010 | (Netherlands) Nyck de Vries*‡ | | (Denmark) Nicolaj Møller Madsen | (Japan) Kiyoto Fujinami | (United Kingdom) Chris Lock | (Italy) Ignazio D'Agosto | (Italy) Antonio Giovinazzi*‡ | (Belgium) Sebastien Bailly | (Denmark) Kevin Munkholm | (Belgium) Sami Luka | (Switzerland) Michaël Hêche | (Denmark) Jacob Nortoft | (Italy) Stefano Cucco | 2010 |
| 2011 | Not held | (Italy) Loris Spinelli | (Belgium) Sami Luka | (Japan) Arata Saeki | (Norway) Dennis Olsen | (Italy) Stefano Cucco | (Italy) Antonio Giovinazzi*‡ | | (Norway) Kenneth Aarsnes | (Denmark) Nicolaj Møller Madsen | (Finland) Teemu Suninen | (Switzerland) Alain Valente | Cancelled | 2011 |
| 2012 | Not held | (Italy) Felice Tiene | (United Kingdom) Ben Barnicoat | (Denmark) Nicklas Nielsen | (Norway) Dennis Olsen | (Monaco) Charles Leclerc* | (Netherlands) Max Verstappen† | | (Finland) Jussi Kuusiniemi | Not held | (Netherlands) Max Verstappen† | (Italy) Felice Tiene | (Poland) Igor Waliłko | 2012 |
| 2013 | (United Kingdom) Tom Joyner | (Poland) Karol Basz | (Netherlands) Max Verstappen† | (Singapore) Julien Fong Wei Jie | (United Kingdom) Callum Ilott | (France) Dorian Boccolacci | (France) Dorian Boccolacci | | | | (Netherlands) Max Verstappen† | (France) Dorian Boccolacci | (United Kingdom) Callum Ilott | 2013 |
| 2014 | (United Kingdom) Lando Norris† | | (United Kingdom) Callum Ilott | | (Poland) Karol Basz | | (United Kingdom) Callum Ilott | | | | (Italy) Alessio Lorandi | (Italy) Alessio Lorandi | (Italy) Stefano Cucco | 2014 |
| 2015 | (Poland) Karol Basz | | (United Kingdom) Ben Hanley | (Japan) Haruyuki Takahashi | (Denmark) Nicklas Nielsen | | (Denmark) Nicklas Nielsen | | | | (Denmark) Nicklas Nielsen | (Russia) Alexander Vartanyan | Not held | 2015 |

Italics indicates the championships where KF / KF2 was the secondary senior class.

Additional international titles that have been held in KF / KF2 since 2007:

Additional titles in KF / KF2
| Year | Competition | Driver |
|---|---|---|
| 2008 | WSK Silver Cup | (United Kingdom) Mackenzie Taylor |
| 2012 | WSK Silver Cup | (Italy) Emanuele Nocita |
| 2012 | Indonesia Kart Prix | (Italy) Antonio Giovinazzi*‡ |
| 2014 | WSK Champions Cup | (Poland) Karol Basz |
| 2015 | WSK Champions Cup | (Denmark) Nicklas Nielsen |
| 2015 | WSK Gold Cup | (Poland) Karol Basz |
| 2015 | WSK Night Edition | (Italy) Leonardo Lorandi |

==== OK (2016–present) ====
Original Kart (OK) has been the primary senior class since 2016 for drivers aged 14 and over, hosting the World Championship each year since its inception.

OK (2016–present)
| Year | Competition | | | | | | | | | | | Year |
| Year | World Championship | European Championship | WSK Final Cup | WSK Euro Series | WSK Super Master Series | WSK Champions Cup | WSK Open Cup | Champions of the Future | South Garda Winter Cup | Andrea Margutti Trophy | Trofeo delle Industrie | Year |
|---|---|---|---|---|---|---|---|---|---|---|---|---|
| 2016 | (Spain) Pedro Hiltbrand | (Spain) Pedro Hiltbrand | (Poland) Karol Basz | | (Italy) Lorenzo Travisanutto | (United States) Logan Sargeant* | | | (Denmark) Nicklas Nielsen | (Russia) Alexander Smolyar | Not held | 2016 |
| 2017 | (United Kingdom) Danny Keirle | (Morocco) Sami Taoufik | (Denmark) Nicklas Nielsen | | (United Kingdom) Clément Novalak (Note: Clément Novalak is French and Swiss but competed under a British licence.) | (Spain) Pedro Hiltbrand | | | (Italy) Lorenzo Travisanutto | (United Kingdom) Callum Bradshaw | (United Kingdom) Chris Lulham | 2017 |
| 2018 | (Italy) Lorenzo Travisanutto | (Germany) Hannes Janker | (Italy) Lorenzo Travisanutto | | (Germany) Hannes Janker | (Denmark) Nicklas Nielsen | (Italy) Luigi Coluccio | | (Germany) Hannes Janker | (Italy) Andrea Rosso | Not held | 2018 |
| 2019 | (Italy) Lorenzo Travisanutto | (Italy) Lorenzo Travisanutto | (Spain) Pedro Hiltbrand | (Italy) Lorenzo Travisanutto | (United Kingdom) Dexter Patterson | (United Kingdom) Taylor Barnard | (United Kingdom) Taylor Barnard | | (Italy) Lorenzo Travisanutto | (Italy) Leonardo Bertini Colla | (Netherlands) Dilano van 't Hoff | 2019 |
| 2020 | (United Kingdom) Callum Bradshaw | (Italy) Andrea Kimi Antonelli† | Cancelled | (Italy) Andrea Kimi Antonelli† | (Russia) Nikita Bedrin | (United Kingdom) Taylor Barnard | (United Kingdom) Taylor Barnard | (Russia) Nikita Bedrin | (United Kingdom) Joe Turney | Not held | Cancelled | 2020 |
| 2021 | (Finland) Tuukka Taponen | (Italy) Andrea Kimi Antonelli† | (United Kingdom) Arvid Lindblad* | (United Kingdom) Arvid Lindblad* | (Brazil) Rafael Câmara* | (Brazil) Rafael Câmara* | (Finland) Tuukka Taponen | (Brazil) Rafael Câmara* | (Japan) Kean Nakamura-Berta | Not held | Not held | 2021 |
| 2022 | (Brazil) Matheus Morgatto | (United Kingdom) Kean Nakamura-Berta (Note: Kean Nakamura-Berta is Japanese and Slovak but competed under a British licence.) | (United Kingdom) Joe Turney | (Japan) Kean Nakamura-Berta | (United Kingdom) Joe Turney | (Italy) Danny Carenini | (Latvia) Tomass Štolcermanis | (United Kingdom) Joe Turney | Cancelled | Not held | Not held | 2022 |
| 2023 | Kirill Kutskov | (Netherlands) René Lammers | Dmitry Matveev | Kirill Kutskov | (United States) James Egozi | (Denmark) David Walther | Not held | (Jamaica) Alex Powell | (Hungary) Martin Molnár | Not held | Not held | 2023 |
| 2024 | (United Kingdom) Ethan Jeff-Hall | (United Kingdom) Joe Turney | (Belgium) Dries Van Langendonck | (Sweden) Scott Lindblom | (Belgium) Ean Eyckmans | (Ukraine) Oleksandr Bondarev | Not held | (United Kingdom) Joe Turney | Cancelled | Not held | Not held | 2024 |
| 2025 | (Belgium) Thibaut Ramaekers | (Spain) Christian Costoya | (Czech Republic) Jindřich Pešl | (Spain) Christian Costoya | (Belgium) Dries Van Langendonck | | Not held | (United Kingdom) Kenzo Craigie | | Not held | Not held | 2025 |
| 2026 | To be determined | To be determined | To be determined | To be determined | (Ukraine) Lev Krutogolov | | Not held | To be determined | | Not held | Not held | 2026 |

Additional international titles that have been held in OK since 2016:

Additional titles in OK
| Year | Competition | Driver |
|---|---|---|
| 2016 | WSK Night Edition | (Russia) Alexander Smolyar |
| 2022 | FIA Motorsport Games | (Belgium) Elie Goldstein |
| 2022 | COTF Winter Series | (Latvia) Tomass Štolcermanis |
| 2024 | FIA Motorsport Games | (Lithuania) Markas Šilkūnas |

==== OK-National (2023–present) ====
OK-National (OK-N) was introduced as the secondary senior class in 2023 for drivers aged 15 and over, and has hosted a World Cup since 2024.

OK-National (2023–present)
| Year | Competition | | | | | | Year |
| Year | World Cup | WSK Final Cup | WSK Euro Series | Champions of the Future | Andrea Margutti Trophy | Trofeo delle Industrie | Year |
|---|---|---|---|---|---|---|---|
| 2023 | Not held | (Italy) Lamberto Ferrari | (Turkey) Batı Ege Yıldırım | (Thailand) Austin Gale | Not held | Not held | 2023 |
| 2024 | (South Korea) Kyuho Lee | (Italy) Nicolas Marchesi | (Poland) Juliusz Ociepa | (Spain) Luna Fluxá | (Italy) Federico Albanese | (Italy) Manuel Scognamiglio | 2024 |
| 2025 | (Italy) Manuel Scognamiglio | (Italy) Nicolas Marchesi | (Italy) Manuel Scognamiglio | (Lithuania) Markas Šilkūnas | (Italy) Manuel Scognamiglio | (Italy) Nicolas Marchesi | 2025 |
| 2026 | To be determined | To be determined | To be determined | To be determined | (Italy) Nicolas Marchesi | To be determined | 2026 |

Italics indicates the championships where OK-N was the secondary senior class.

Additional international titles that have been held in OK-N since 2023:

Additional titles in OK-N
| Year | Competition | Driver |
|---|---|---|
| 2023 | Road to the World Cup | (Italy) Antonio Apicella |
| 2024 | WSK Open Series | (Poland) Karol Pasiewicz |
| 2024 | WSK Super Cup | (Italy) Nicolas Marchesi |

=== Junior classes ===
CIK-FIA junior class timeline in kart racing
| Category | 1968– | 1970s | 1980s | 1990s | 2000s | 2010s | 2020s |
| 100 cc | | | | | | | |
| Formula | | | | | | | |
|---|---|---|---|---|---|---|---|
| Formula | | | ICA-J | | | | |
| KF | | | | | | | |
| KF | | | | | KF3 | KF-J | |
| OK | | | | | | | |
| OK | | | | | | | OK-J |
| OK | | | | | | | OKN-J |
| Category | | | | | | | |
| Category | 1968– | 1970s | 1980s | 1990s | 2000s | 2010s | 2020s |

Key
| Both World and European titles held. |
| Only World title held. |
| Only European title held. |
| Only active in other international competitions. |
| World Championship held. |
| Both World Championship and World Cup / International Super Cup held. |
| Only World Cup / International Super Cup held. |

==== KF-Junior / KF3 (2007–2015) ====
KF3 was introduced as the junior class in 2007 for drivers aged 13 to 15, being upgraded to World Championship status in 2010 as the U18 World Championship; it was renamed KF-Junior (KF-J) in 2013.

KF-Junior / KF3 (2007–2015)
| Year | Competition | | | | | | | | | | | | | | Year |
| Year | World Championship (Note: Held as the U18 World Championship from 2010 to 2012.) | World Cup | European Championship | Asia-Pacific Championship | WSK Final Cup | WSK Euro Series | WSK Super Master Series | WSK World Series | Monaco Kart Cup | Viking Trophy | Bridgestone Cup | South Garda Winter Cup | Andrea Margutti Trophy | Trofeo delle Industrie | Year |
|---|---|---|---|---|---|---|---|---|---|---|---|---|---|---|---|
| 2007 | Not held | | (United Kingdom) Jack Harvey | (Spain) Gerard Barrabeig | | | | (Italy) Matteo Vigano | (United Kingdom) Max Goff | (Sweden) Timmy Hansen‡ | (United Kingdom) Max Goff | (Sweden) Viktor Öberg | (United Kingdom) Jack Harvey | (Finland) Aaro Vainio | 2007 |
| 2008 | Not held | | (Finland) Aaro Vainio | (Spain) Carlos Sainz Jr.* | | | | (Netherlands) Nyck de Vries*‡ | (Finland) Aaro Vainio | (Russia) Maxim Zimin | (Russia) Daniil Kvyat* | (Finland) Aaro Vainio | (Italy) Ignazio D'Agosto | (Russia) Daniil Kvyat* | 2008 |
| 2009 | Not held | (Italy) Giuliano Maria Niceta | (Netherlands) Nyck de Vries*‡ | (United Kingdom) Jordan King | | | | (Netherlands) Nyck de Vries*‡ | (Spain) Carlos Sainz Jr.* | (Denmark) Andreas Hansen | (Russia) Pavel Rudakov | (Russia) Daniil Kvyat* | (Italy) Daniil Kvyat* (Note: Daniil Kvyat is Russian but competed under an Italian licence.) | (Italy) Pietro Lacaita | 2009 |
| 2010 | (United Kingdom) Jake Dennis‡ | (United Kingdom) Alexander Albon* | (United Kingdom) Alexander Albon* | (United Kingdom) Matthew Graham | (Netherlands) Max Verstappen† | (Netherlands) Max Verstappen† | (Denmark) Nicklas Nielsen | (Netherlands) Max Verstappen† | (Monaco) Charles Leclerc* | (Denmark) Nicolas Beer | (Netherlands) Max Verstappen† | (Russia) Egor Orudzhev | (Italy) Loris Spinelli | (Italy) Kevin Lavelli | 2010 |
| 2011 | (United Kingdom) Matthew Graham | (Monaco) Charles Leclerc* | (United Kingdom) George Russell* | (Denmark) Nicklas Nielsen | (Denmark) Nicklas Nielsen | (Netherlands) Max Verstappen† | (Italy) Antonio Fuoco | | Cancelled | (Norway) Dennis Olsen | (Italy) Luca Corberi | (Norway) Dennis Olsen | (Denmark) Slavko Ivanovic | Cancelled | 2011 |
| 2012 | (United Kingdom) Henry Easthope | (Italy) Luca Corberi | (United Kingdom) George Russell* | (India) Jehan Daruvala | (United Kingdom) Callum Ilott | (Spain) Álex Palou | (United Kingdom) Callum Ilott | | | (Russia) Nikita Sitnikov | (Germany) David Beckmann | (United Kingdom) George Russell* | (Croatia) Martin Kodrić | (United Kingdom) Callum Ilott | 2012 |
| 2013 | (Italy) Alessio Lorandi | (United Kingdom) Lando Norris† | (United Kingdom) Lando Norris† | Not held | (Russia) Robert Shwartzman | (United Kingdom) Lando Norris† | (Italy) Alessio Lorandi | | | | | (Denmark) Christian Lundgaard | (United Kingdom) Dan Ticktum | (Russia) Alexander Vartanyan | 2013 |
| 2014 | (United Kingdom) Enaam Ahmed | | (United Kingdom) Enaam Ahmed | | (Indonesia) Presley Martono | | (United Kingdom) Enaam Ahmed | | | | | (United Kingdom) Enaam Ahmed | (United Kingdom) Max Fewtrell | (Austria) Simon Reicher | 2014 |
| 2015 | (United States) Logan Sargeant* | | (Denmark) Christian Lundgaard | Not held | (Denmark) Frederik Vesti | | (United Kingdom) Clément Novalak | | | | | (Italy) Alessio Lorandi | (India) Kush Maini | (Spain) Marta García | 2015 |

Additional international titles that have been held in KF-J / KF3 since 2007:

Additional titles in KF-J / KF3
| Year | Competition | Driver |
|---|---|---|
| 2008 | WSK Silver Cup | (Russia) Daniil Kvyat* |
| 2012 | WSK Silver Cup | (United Kingdom) Callum Ilott |
| 2014 | WSK Champions Cup | (United Kingdom) Enaam Ahmed |
| 2015 | WSK Champions Cup | (United States) Logan Sargeant* |
| 2015 | WSK Gold Cup | (Denmark) Christian Lundgaard |
| 2015 | Vega International Winter Trophy | (Russia) Artem Petrov |
| 2015 | WSK Night Edition | (United States) Logan Sargeant* |

==== OK-Junior (2016–present) ====
OK-Junior (OK-J) replaced KF-Junior as the junior class in 2016 for drivers aged 12 to 14, and has hosted a World Championship each year since.

OK-Junior (2016–present)
| Year | Competition | | | | | | | | | | | Year |
| Year | World Championship | European Championship | WSK Final Cup | WSK Euro Series | WSK Super Master Series | WSK Champions Cup | WSK Open Cup | Champions of the Future | South Garda Winter Cup | Andrea Margutti Trophy | Trofeo delle Industrie | Year |
|---|---|---|---|---|---|---|---|---|---|---|---|---|
| 2016 | (France) Victor Martins | (United Kingdom) Finlay Kenneally | (France) Victor Martins | | (Morocco) Sami Taoufik | (United Kingdom) Kiern Jewiss | | | (United Kingdom) Finlay Kenneally | (Russia) Ivan Shvetsov | (Russia) Pavel Bulantsev | 2016 |
| 2017 | (United Kingdom) Dexter Patterson | (United Kingdom) Jonny Edgar | (Czech Republic) Roman Staněk | | (Italy) Andrea Rosso | (Russia) Ilya Morozov | | | (United Kingdom) Harry Thompson | (Italy) Andrea Rosso | (United Kingdom) Dexter Patterson | 2017 |
| 2018 | (France) Victor Bernier | (Estonia) Paul Aron | (United Kingdom) Taylor Barnard | | (Italy) Gabriele Minì | (Estonia) Paul Aron | (Russia) Kirill Smal | | (Estonia) Paul Aron | (Italy) Enzo Trulli | (Russia) Kirill Smal | 2018 |
| 2019 | (Netherlands) Thomas ten Brinke | (France) Marcus Amand | (Italy) Andrea Kimi Antonelli† | (Italy) Andrea Kimi Antonelli† | (Italy) Andrea Kimi Antonelli† | (Republic of Ireland) Alex Dunne | (Italy) Andrea Kimi Antonelli† | | (Italy) Andrea Kimi Antonelli† | (Sweden) Theo Wernersson | (Italy) Alessandro Cenedese | 2019 |
| 2020 | (United Kingdom) Freddie Slater | (United States) Ugo Ugochukwu | Cancelled | (Italy) Alfio Spina | (United Kingdom) Arvid Lindblad* | (Italy) Alfio Spina | (United Kingdom) Freddie Slater | (United Kingdom) Arvid Lindblad* | (Norway) Martinius Stenshorne | (Jamaica) Alex Powell | Cancelled | 2020 |
| 2021 | (Japan) Kean Nakamura-Berta | (United Kingdom) Freddie Slater | (Spain) Lucas Fluxá | (United Kingdom) Harley Keeble | (United Arab Emirates) Rashid Al Dhaheri | (United Arab Emirates) Rashid Al Dhaheri | (United States) James Egozi | (United Kingdom) Freddie Slater | (United Kingdom) Freddie Slater | Not held | (Russia) Kirill Dzitiev | 2021 |
| 2022 | (Thailand) Enzo Tarnvanichkul | Anatoly Khavalkin | (Italy) Emanuele Olivieri | (Poland) Jan Przyrowski | (Ukraine) Oleksandr Bondarev | (Peru) Andrés Cárdenas | (Colombia) Salim Hanna | (United Kingdom) Nathan Tye | Cancelled | (Estonia) Mark Dubnitski | (Colombia) Salim Hanna | 2022 |
| 2023 | (Belgium) Dries Van Langendonck | (Ukraine) Oleksandr Bondarev | (Belgium) Dries Van Langendonck | (Italy) Iacopo Martinese | Stepan Antonov | (United Kingdom) Lewis Wherrell | Not held | (United Kingdom) Lewis Wherrell | (Austria) Niklas Schaufler | (Romania) David Cosma Cristofor | (United Kingdom) Lewis Wherrell | 2023 |
| 2024 | (United Kingdom) Kenzo Craigie | (Belgium) Dries Van Langendonck | (United Kingdom) Noah Baglin | (United States) Jack Iliffe | (Austria) Niklas Schaufler | (Austria) Niklas Schaufler | Not held | (Belgium) Dries Van Langendonck | Cancelled | (Switzerland) Kilian Josseron | (Italy) Filippo Sala | 2024 |
| 2025 | (United Kingdom) Noah Baglin | (Netherlands) Dean Hoogendoorn | (Spain) Bosco Arias | (Turkey) İskender Zülfikari | (Netherlands) Dean Hoogendoorn | | | (United Kingdom) Noah Baglin | | Ilia Berezkin | (Italy) Antônio Pizzonia Neto (Note: Antônio Pizzonia Neto is Brazilian but competed under an Italian licence.) | 2025 |
| 2026 | To be determined | To be determined | To be determined | To be determined | (Brazil) Antônio Pizzonia Neto | | | To be determined | | Not held | To be determined | 2026 |

Additional international titles that have been held in OK-J since 2016:

Additional titles in OK-J
| Year | Competition | Driver |
|---|---|---|
| 2016 | WSK Night Edition | (Russia) Dmitrii Bogdanov |
| 2022 | FIA Motorsport Games | (Peru) Andrés Cárdenas |
| 2022 | COTF Winter Series | (Poland) Maciej Gładysz |
| 2024 | FIA Motorsport Games | (United Kingdom) Jorge Edgar |

==== OKN-Junior (2023–present) ====
OKN-Junior (OKN-J) was introduced as a secondary junior class in 2023 for drivers under the age of 15, and will host a World Cup from 2025 onwards.

OKN-Junior (2023–present)
| Year | Competition | | | | | | | Year |
| Year | World Cup | WSK Final Cup | WSK Euro Series | WSK Super Master Series | Champions of the Future | Andrea Margutti Trophy | Trofeo delle Industrie | Year |
|---|---|---|---|---|---|---|---|---|
| 2023 | Not held | (Poland) Juliusz Ociepa | (Netherlands) Dean Hoogendoorn | Not held | (Australia) James Anagnostiadis | Not held | Not held | 2023 |
| 2024 | Not held | (Italy) Michele Orlando | (Australia) Sebastian Eskandari-Marandi | (Romania) Bogdan Cosma Cristofor | (Australia) James Anagnostiadis | (Italy) Ludovico Mazzola | (Italy) Michele Orlando | 2024 |
| 2025 | (Italy) Gioele Girardello | (Poland) Błażej Kostrzewa | (China) Huifei Xie | (United States) Lucas Palacio | (United Arab Emirates) Conor Clancy | (Ukraine) Vsevolod Osadchyi-Suslovskyi | (Poland) Błażej Kostrzewa | 2025 |
| 2026 | To be determined | To be determined | To be determined | (Italy) Niccolò Perico | To be determined | (Italy) Gioele Carrer | To be determined | 2026 |

Italics indicates the championships where OKN-J was the secondary junior class.

Additional international titles that have been held in OKN-J since 2023:

Additional titles in OKN-J
| Year | Competition | Driver |
|---|---|---|
| 2023 | WSK Open Series | (Romania) David Cosma Cristofor |
| 2023 | Road to the World Cup | (United Kingdom) Jesse Phillips |
| 2024 | WSK Champions Cup | (Bulgaria) Lyuboslav Ruykov |
| 2024 | WSK Open Series | Ilia Berezkin |
| 2024 | WSK Super Cup | Ilia Berezkin |

=== Gearbox classes ===
CIK-FIA gearbox class timeline in kart racing
| Category | 1974– | 1980s | 1990s | 2000s | | 2010s | 2020s |
| Formula | | | | | | | |
|---|---|---|---|---|---|---|---|
| Formula | FC | | | | | | |
| Formula | FC-2 | | ICC | | | | |
| Formula | | | | S-ICC | | | |
| KZ | | | | | | | |
| KZ | | | | | KZ1 | | KZ |
| KZ | | | | | | | KZ2 |
| KZ | | | | | | | KZ2-M |
| Category | | | | | | | |
| Category | 1974– | 1980s | 1990s | 2000s | | 2010s | 2020s |

Key
| Both World and European titles held. |
| Only World title held. |
| Only European title held. |
| Only active in other international competitions. |
| World Championship held. |
| Both World Championship and World Cup / International Super Cup held. |
| Only World Cup / International Super Cup held. |

==== KZ / KZ1 (2007–present) ====
KZ1 became the primary gearbox class for drivers aged 15 and over in 2007 and was renamed to KZ in 2013, when it was upgraded to World Championship status.

KZ / KZ1 (2007–present)
| Year | Competition | | | | | | Year |
| Year | World Championship | World Cup | European Championship | WSK Euro Series | WSK Super Master Series | Champions of the Future | Year |
|---|---|---|---|---|---|---|---|
| 2007 | Not held | (Belgium) Jonathan Thonon | (Italy) Alessandro Manetti | | | | 2007 |
| 2008 | Not held | (Belgium) Jonathan Thonon | (Belgium) Jonathan Thonon | | | | 2008 |
| 2009 | Not held | (Belgium) Jonathan Thonon | (Netherlands) Bas Lammers | | | | 2009 |
| 2010 | Not held | (Netherlands) Bas Lammers | (Netherlands) Bas Lammers | (Belgium) Jonathan Thonon | Not held | | 2010 |
| 2011 | Not held | (Belgium) Jonathan Thonon | (Italy) Paolo De Conto | (Belgium) Rick Dreezen | (Italy) Paolo De Conto | | 2011 |
| 2012 | Not held | (Netherlands) Bas Lammers | (Netherlands) Jorrit Pex | (Netherlands) Jorrit Pex | (Italy) Marco Ardigò | | 2012 |
| 2013 | (Netherlands) Max Verstappen† | | (Netherlands) Max Verstappen† | (Netherlands) Max Verstappen† | Not held | | 2013 |
| 2014 | (Italy) Marco Ardigò | | (Belgium) Rick Dreezen | | Not held | | 2014 |
| 2015 | (Netherlands) Jorrit Pex | | (Italy) Flavio Camponeschi | | Not held | | 2015 |
| 2016 | (Italy) Paolo De Conto | | (Italy) Marco Ardigò | | (Italy) Marco Ardigò | | 2016 |
| 2017 | (Italy) Paolo De Conto | | (Italy) Paolo De Conto | | Not held | | 2017 |
| 2018 | (Czech Republic) Patrik Hájek | | (Netherlands) Jorrit Pex | | Not held | | 2018 |
| 2019 | (Netherlands) Marijn Kremers | | (Netherlands) Jorrit Pex | Not held | Not held | | 2019 |
| 2020 | (France) Jérémy Iglesias | | (Netherlands) Marijn Kremers | Not held | Not held | Not held | 2020 |
| 2021 | (Sweden) Noah Milell | | (Italy) Riccardo Longhi | Not held | Not held | Not held | 2021 |
| 2022 | (Sweden) Viktor Gustavsson | | (Italy) Paolo Ippolito | Not held | Not held | Not held | 2022 |
| 2023 | (Italy) Paolo Ippolito | | (Italy) Danilo Albanese | Not held | Not held | Not held | 2023 |
| 2024 | (Italy) Giuseppe Palomba | | (Italy) Lorenzo Travisanutto | Not held | Not held | (France) Jérémy Iglesias | 2024 |
| 2025 | (Netherlands) Senna van Walstijn | | (France) Mattéo Spirgel | Not held | Not held | (Netherlands) Senna van Walstijn | 2025 |
| 2026 | To be determined | | To be determined | Not held | Not held | To be determined | 2026 |

Additional international titles that have been held in KZ / KZ1 since 2007:

Additional titles in KZ / KZ1
| Year | Competition | Driver |
|---|---|---|
| 2011 | WSK Final Cup | (Netherlands) Bas Lammers |
| 2015 | Asia-Pacific Championship | (Italy) Lorenzo Camplese |
| 2016 | Asia-Pacific Championship | (France) Tom Leuillet |
| 2023 | Road to Wackersdorf | (Sweden) Viktor Gustavsson |
| 2025 | Road to Mülsen | (France) Émilien Denner |

==== KZ2 (2007–present) ====
KZ2 was introduced as the secondary gearbox class for drivers aged 15 and over in 2007, and has hosted a World Cup since 2011.

KZ2 (2007–present)
| Year | Competition | | | | | | | | | | | | | | Year |
| Year | World Cup (Note: Years held as an International Super Cup: 2013–2021.) | European Championship | WSK Final Cup | WSK Euro Series | WSK Super Master Series | WSK Champions Cup | WSK World Series | WSK Open Series (Note: Previously the WSK Open Cup from 2018 to 2022.) | Champions of the Future | Viking Trophy | Bridgestone Cup | South Garda Winter Cup | Andrea Margutti Trophy | Trofeo delle Industrie | Year |
|---|---|---|---|---|---|---|---|---|---|---|---|---|---|---|---|
| 2007 | Not held | (Netherlands) Thomas Knopper | | | | | (Belgium) Jonathan Thonon | | | (Sweden) Mattias Ekman | (Italy) Fabian Federer | Not held | Not held | (France) Thomas Mich | 2007 |
| 2008 | Not held | (France) Tony Lavanant | | | | | (Italy) Marco Ardigò | | | (Finland) Pekka Seppänen | (Italy) Gianluca Cane | Not held | Not held | Not held | 2008 |
| 2009 | Not held | (Italy) Angelo Lombardo | | | | | (Netherlands) Bas Lammers | | | (Denmark) Andreas Fasberg | (Italy) Paolo De Conto | Not held | (United Kingdom) Jack Hawksworth | (Italy) Yuri Lucati | 2009 |
| 2010 | Not held | (Italy) Paolo De Conto | (Italy) Marco Ardigò | (Italy) Paolo De Conto | (Netherlands) Beitske Visser | | (Belgium) Jonathan Thonon | | | (Sweden) Viktor Öberg | (Sweden) Tobias Nilsson | Not held | (Germany) Simon Solgat | Not held | 2010 |
| 2011 | (Netherlands) Joey Hanssen | (Italy) Fabian Federer | (Netherlands) Bas Lammers | (Sweden) Joel Johansson | (Italy) Marco Zanchetta | | Cancelled | | | (Sweden) Viktor Öberg | (Netherlands) Jorrit Pex | (Czech Republic) Patrik Hájek | (Czech Republic) Adam Janouš | Cancelled | 2011 |
| 2012 | (United Kingdom) Jordon Lennox-Lamb | (Lithuania) Simas Juodvirsis | (Italy) Riccardo Negro | (Lithuania) Simas Juodvirsis | (United Kingdom) Jordon Lennox-Lamb | | | | | (Finland) Henri Kokko | Not held | (Belgium) Rick Dreezen | (Italy) Fabian Federer | (Sweden) Joel Johansson | 2012 |
| 2013 | (France) Dorian Boccolacci | (Norway) Emil Antonsen | (Czech Republic) Patrik Hájek | (Italy) Riccardo Negro | (Netherlands) Max Verstappen† | | | | | | | (Monaco) Charles Leclerc* | (Croatia) Kristijan Habulin | (Italy) Davide Forè | 2013 |
| 2014 | (Netherlands) Ryan Van Der Burgt | (Italy) Andrea Dalè | (Italy) Marco Ardigò | | (Italy) Marco Ardigò | (United Kingdom) Ben Hanley | | | | | | (Italy) Paolo De Conto | (Italy) Marco Zanchetta | (Sweden) Kevin Engman | 2014 |
| 2015 | (France) Thomas Laurent | (Sweden) Joel Johansson | (Italy) Marco Ardigò | | (Italy) Marco Ardigò | Not held | | | | | | (Italy) Flavio Camponeschi | (Italy) Davide Forè | (Finland) Simo Puhakka | 2015 |
| 2016 | (Spain) Pedro Hiltbrand | (Italy) Fabian Federer | (Italy) Marco Ardigò | | (Italy) Leonardo Lorandi | (Italy) Paolo De Conto | | | | | | (Italy) Marco Ardigò | (Italy) Giacomo Pollini | (Italy) Riccardo Longhi | 2016 |
| 2017 | (Italy) Alex Irlando | (Germany) Leon Köhler | (Italy) Francesco Iacovacci | | (Netherlands) Bas Lammers | (Netherlands) Stan Pex | | | | | | (France) Jérémy Iglesias | (Italy) Riccardo Longhi | (Italy) Riccardo Longhi | 2017 |
| 2018 | (Italy) Matteo Viganò | (France) Adrien Renaudin | (France) Adrien Renaudin | | (Italy) Marco Ardigò | (Romania) Daniel Vasile | | (Italy) Riccardo Longhi | | | | (United Kingdom) Ben Hanley | (Italy) Alessio Lorandi | (Italy) Alessandro Pelizzari | 2018 |
| 2019 | (France) Émilien Denner | (Sweden) Emil Skärås | (Sweden) Douglas Lundberg | (Italy) Marco Ardigò | (Netherlands) Bas Lammers | Not held | | (Italy) Giuseppe Palomba | | | | (France) Anthony Abbasse | (France) Emilien Denner | (Italy) Lorenzo Giannoni | 2019 |
| 2020 | (Italy) Simone Cunati | (Sweden) Viktor Gustavsson | Cancelled | (Italy) Riccardo Longhi | (Finland) Simo Puhakka | Not held | | (Netherlands) Stan Pex | (Italy) Paolo Ippolito | | | (Italy) Giuseppe Palomba | (Netherlands) Senna van Walstijn | Cancelled | 2020 |
| 2021 | (Italy) Lorenzo Travisanutto | (Italy) Giacomo Pollini | (Italy) Francesco Celenta | (Italy) Riccardo Longhi | (Netherlands) Marijn Kremers | (Sweden) Viktor Gustavsson | | (Italy) Giuseppe Palomba | Not held | | | (Netherlands) Marijn Kremers | (Netherlands) Senna van Walstijn | (Italy) Alessandro Buran | 2021 |
| 2022 | (France) Arthur Carbonnel | (France) Tom Leuillet | (Netherlands) Senna van Walstijn | (Italy) Riccardo Longhi | (Netherlands) Senna van Walstijn | (Netherlands) Senna van Walstijn | | (France) Emilien Denner | Not held | | | Cancelled | (Italy) Giuseppe Palomba | (Italy) Alex Maragliano | 2022 |
| 2023 | (Germany) Niels Tröger | (United Kingdom) Freddie Slater | (Germany) David Trefilov | Not held | (Italy) Cristian Bertuca | (Italy) Cristian Bertuca | | (Netherlands) Stan Pex | Not held | | | (Ukraine) Viacheslav Putiatin | (Italy) Cristian Bertuca | (Italy) Riccardo Longhi | 2023 |
| 2024 | (Italy) Cristian Bertuca | (France) Mattéo Spirgel | Maksim Orlov | Not held | (Italy) Cristian Bertuca | (Estonia) Markus Kajak | | (Italy) Cristian Bertuca | (Romania) Daniel Vasile | | | Cancelled | (France) Arthur Poulain | (Italy) Cristian Bertuca | 2024 |
| 2025 | Maksim Orlov | Maksim Orlov | (Italy) Cristian Bertuca | Not held | (Netherlands) Senna van Walstijn | | | | Maksim Orlov | | | | (Italy) Cristian Bertuca | (Italy) Cristian Bertuca | 2025 |
| 2026 | To be determined | To be determined | To be determined | Not held | Maksim Orlov | | | | To be determined | | | | (Italy) Cristian Bertuca | To be determined | 2026 |

Italics indicates the championships where KZ2 was the secondary gearbox class.

Additional international titles that have been held in KZ2 since 2007:

Additional titles in KZ2
| Year | Competition | Driver |
|---|---|---|
| 2008 | WSK Silver Cup | (Netherlands) Jorrit Pex |
| 2009 | Monaco Kart Cup | (France) Anthony Abbasse |
| 2010 | Monaco Kart Cup | (France) Norman Nato |
| 2012 | WSK Silver Cup | (Italy) Santo Schipani |
| 2015 | WSK Gold Cup | (Italy) Flavio Camponeschi |
| 2015 | WSK Night Edition | (Belgium) Jonathan Thonon |
| 2015 | Vega International Winter Trophy | (Italy) Francesco Celenta |
| 2016 | WSK Night Edition | (Italy) Alessandro Pelizzari |
| 2022 | COTF Winter Series | (Finland) Simo Puhakka |
| 2023 | Road to Wackersdorf | (Latvia) Tomass Štolcermanis |
| 2025 | Road to Mülsen | (Kyrgyzstan) Maksim Orlov (Note: Maksim Orlov is Russian but competed under a Kyrgyz licence.) |

==== KZ2-Masters (2022–present) ====
KZ2-Masters (KZ2-M) was introduced at the World Cup in 2022 as a gearbox class for drivers aged 35 and over.

KZ2-Masters (2022–present)
| Year | Competition | | | Year |
| Year | World Cup (Note: Years held as an International Super Cup: 2022–present.) | European Championship | Champions of the Future | Year |
|---|---|---|---|---|
| 2022 | (France) Thomas Letailleur | Not held | Not held | 2022 |
| 2023 | (Italy) Davide Forè | Not held | Not held | 2023 |
| 2024 | (France) Anthony Abbasse | (Italy) Riccardo Nalon | (France) Anthony Abbasse | 2024 |
| 2025 | (Italy) Angelo Lombardo | (Italy) Antonio Piccioni | (Italy) Angelo Lombardo | 2025 |
| 2026 | To be determined | To be determined | To be determined | 2026 |

Additional international titles that have been held in KZ2-M since 2022:

Additional titles in KZ2-M
| Year | Competition | Driver |
|---|---|---|
| 2023 | Road to Wackersdorf | (Italy) Davide Forè |
| 2024 | WSK Open Series | (Italy) Davide Forè |

=== Other classes ===
==== Superkart (2007–2019) ====
The superkart class ran from 2002 to 2019 at the European Championship, with a secondary division also contested in 2003 and 2004.

===== Superkart-1 (2007–2019) =====
Superkart-1 (2007–2019)
| Year | European Championship | Ref |
|---|---|---|
| 2007 | (United Kingdom) Gavin Bennett | |
| 2008 | (Germany) Peter Elkmann | |
| 2009 | (United Kingdom) Gavin Bennett | |
| 2010 | (United Kingdom) Gavin Bennett | |
| 2011 | (France) Emmanuel Vinuales | |
| 2012 | (United Kingdom) Lee Harpham | |
| 2013 | (France) Emmanuel Vinuales | |
| 2014 | (France) Emmanuel Vinuales | |
| 2015 | (Czech Republic) Adam Kout | |
| 2016 | (Czech Republic) Adam Kout | |
| 2017 | (Germany) Peter Elkmann | |
| 2018 | (Germany) Peter Elkmann | |
| 2019 | (Germany) Peter Elkmann | |
| 2020 | Cancelled | |
| 2021 | Cancelled | |
| 2022 | Cancelled | |

==== Academy (2010–present) ====
The Academy Trophy was inaugurated in 2010 as a spec series for junior drivers aged 12 to 14. The competition was divided into Junior (12–14) and Senior (14–16) classes in 2025.

===== Single-class Academy (2010–2024) =====
Single-class Academy (2010–2024)
| Year | Academy Trophy | Ref |
|---|---|---|
| 2010 | (Finland) Niklas Tiihonen | |
| 2011 | (Monaco) Charles Leclerc* | |
| 2012 | (Finland) Joonas Lappalainen | |
| 2013 | (Belgium) Maxime Potty | |
| 2014 | (Netherlands) Richard Verschoor | |
| 2015 | (Spain) Marta García | |
| 2016 | (United Kingdom) Callum Bradshaw | |
| 2017 | (Belgium) Xavier Handsaeme | |
| 2018 | (Spain) Mari Boya | |
| 2019 | (Lithuania) Kajus Siksnelis | |
| 2020 | (United States) Connor Zilisch | |
| 2021 | (Poland) Maciej Gładysz | |
| 2022 | (France) Arthur Dorison | |
| 2023 | (Spain) Hugo Martí | |
| 2024 | (Belgium) Gilles Herman | |

===== Academy-Senior (2025–present) =====
Academy-Senior (2025–present)
| Year | Academy Trophy | Ref |
|---|---|---|
| 2025 | (Japan) Yuzuki Sato | |
| 2026 | To be determined | |

===== Academy-Junior (2025–present) =====
Academy-Junior (2025–present)
| Year | Academy Trophy | Ref |
|---|---|---|
| 2025 | (Finland) Oiva Vettenranta | |
| 2026 | To be determined | |

Additional international titles that have been held in Academy since 2010:

Additional titles in Academy
| Year | Competition | Driver |
|---|---|---|
| 2011 | Bridgestone Cup | (Italy) Marco Tormen |

==== 60 Mini (2020–present) ====
60 Mini has been present in international competition from as early as 2010 for drivers under the age of 12, but was not formally recognised by the CIK-FIA until 2020. This table includes results from Mini Gr.3, a derivative subclass using IAME engines.

60 Mini (2020–present)
| Year | Competition | | | | | | | | | Year |
| Year | WSK Final Cup | WSK Euro Series | WSK Super Master Series | WSK Champions Cup | WSK Open Series | WSK Super Cup | Champions of the Future | Andrea Margutti Trophy | Trofeo delle Industrie | Year |
|---|---|---|---|---|---|---|---|---|---|---|
| 2020 | Cancelled | (Netherlands) René Lammers | (Russia) Dmitry Matveev | (Russia) Anatoly Khavalkin | (Poland) Maciej Gładysz | | (Russia) Dmitry Matveev | (Netherlands) René Lammers | Cancelled | 2020 |
| 2021 | (Romania) David Cosma Cristofor | (Spain) Christian Costoya | (Netherlands) René Lammers | (Netherlands) René Lammers | (Austria) Niklas Schaufler | | Not held | (Italy) Emanuele Olivieri | (Sweden) Elliot Kaczynski | 2021 |
| 2022 | (Turkey) İskender Zülfikari | (Italy) Iacopo Martinese | (Czech Republic) Jindřich Pešl | (Spain) Christian Costoya | (Turkey) İskender Zülfikari | (Italy) Iacopo Martinese | Not held | (Belgium) Dries Van Langendonck | (Italy) Filippo Sala | 2022 |
| 2023 | (Italy) Cristian Blandino | (Romania) Bogdan Cosma Cristofor | (Turkey) İskender Zülfikari | (Turkey) İskender Zülfikari | (United Kingdom) Noah Baglin | (Turkey) İskender Zülfikari | (Switzerland) Dan Allemann | (Spain) Bosco Arias | (United Kingdom) Noah Baglin | 2023 |
| 2024 | (Italy) Julian Frasnelli | (Netherlands) Daniel Mirón | (Australia) William Calleja | (Italy) Cristian Blandino | (France) Stan Ratajski | (Netherlands) Daniel Mirón | (Belgium) Priam Bruno | (Italy) Alessandro Truchot (Note: Alessandro Truchot is French and American but competed under an Italian licence.) | (Netherlands) Daniel Mirón | 2024 |
| 2025 | (Italy) Niccolò Perico | (Sweden) Elton Hedfors | (Italy) Niccolò Perico | | | | (Italy) Niccolò Perico | (Italy) Niccolò Perico | (France) Stan Ratajski | 2025 |
| 2026 | To be determined | To be determined | (Malta) Zane Pace | | | | To be determined | (United Kingdom) Alfie Mair | To be determined | 2026 |

Additional international titles that have been held in 60 Mini since 2020:

Additional titles in 60 Mini
| Year | Competition | Driver |
|---|---|---|
| 2023 | South Garda Winter Cup | (Turkey) İskender Zülfikari |

== By driver ==
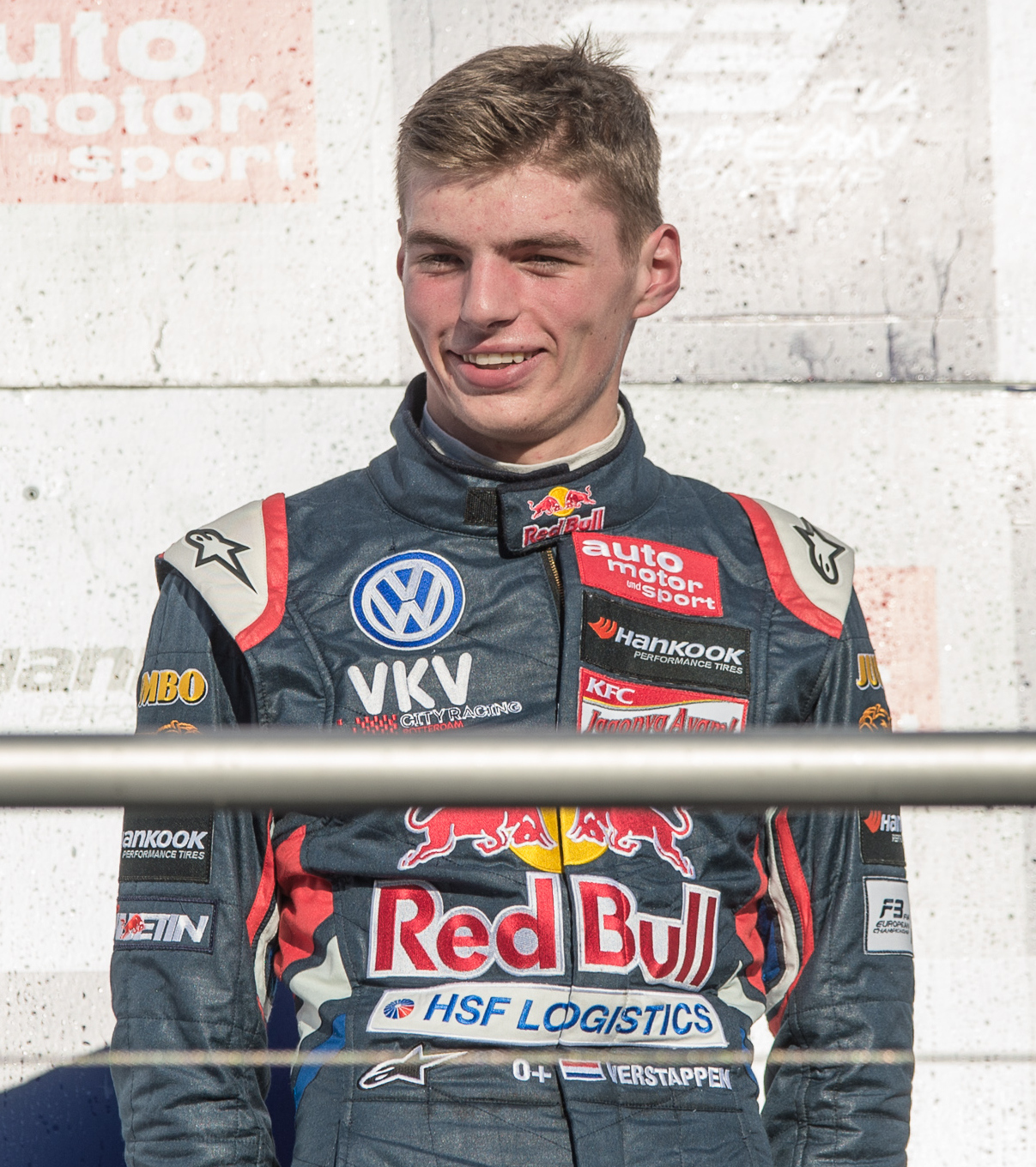
Max Verstappen won 13 international titles between 2010 and 2013, including one World and two European Championships.

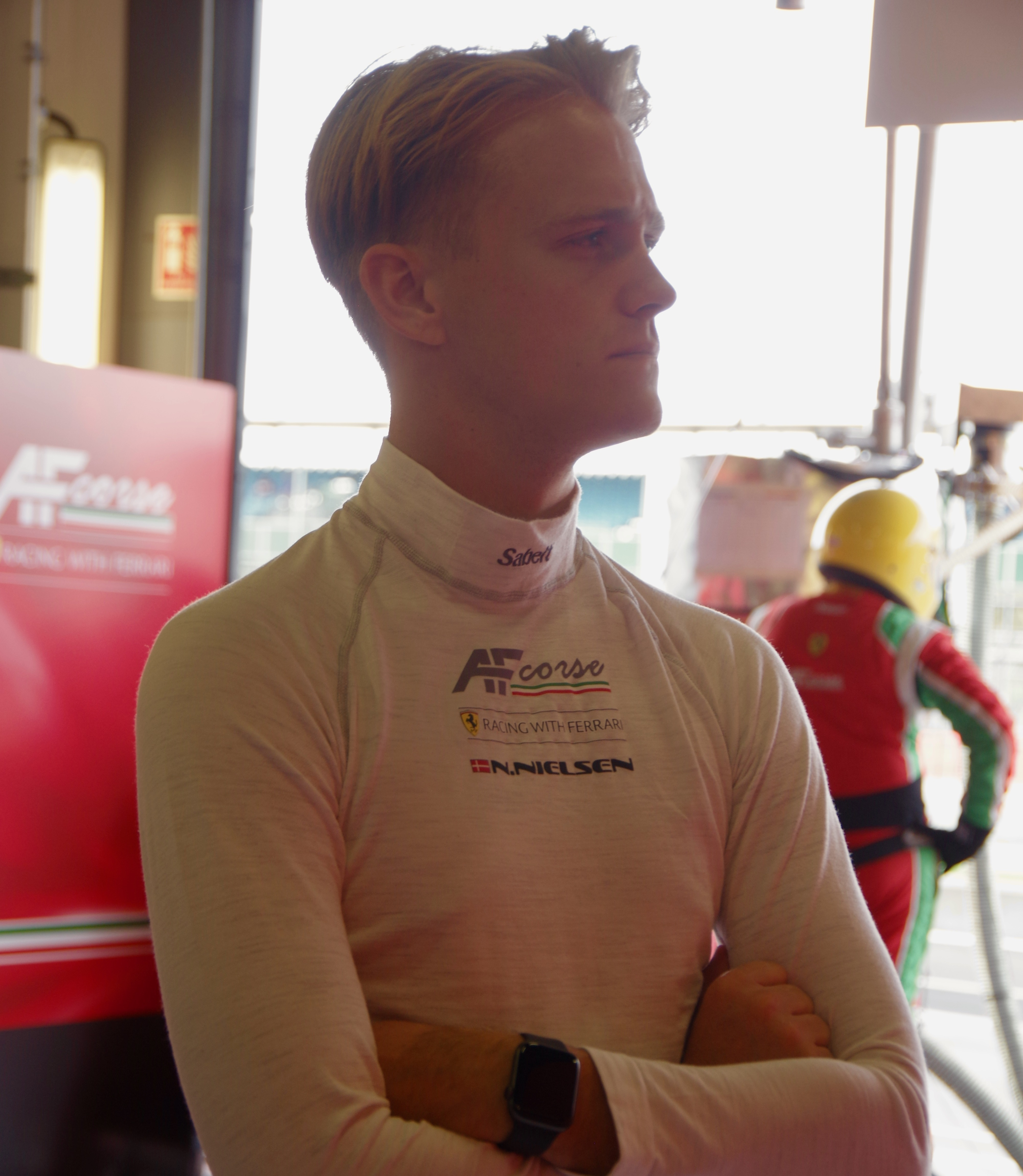
Nicklas Nielsen won 11 international titles from 2010 to 2018 in the KF3, KF2, KF, and OK classes.

The following is a list of drivers with at least five titles in international kart racing since 2007.

By driver
| # | Driver | Titles | World | | Euro | Span | Age |
| # | Driver | Titles | Cha | Cup | Euro | Span | Age |
|---|---|---|---|---|---|---|---|
| 1 | (Italy) Marco Ardigò | 22 | 3 | 1 | 3 | 2007–2019 | 23–36 |
| 2 | (Netherlands) Max Verstappen† | 13 | 1 | 0 | 2 | 2010–2013 | 12–16 |
| 3 | (Denmark) Nicklas Nielsen | 11 | 0 | 0 | 0 | 2010–2018 | 12–21 |
| 3 | (Italy) Cristian Bertuca | 11 | 0 | 0 | 0 | 2023–2026 | 16–20 |
| 5 | (Italy) Lorenzo Travisanutto | 10 | 2 | 1 | 2 | 2016–2024 | 16–25 |
| 5 | (Italy) Paolo De Conto | 10 | 2 | 0 | 3 | 2010–2017 | 17–25 |
| 7 | (Belgium) Jonathan Thonon | 9 (Note: Thonon won a total of 10 international titles, one of which was before 2007—the ICA European Championship in 2002.) | 0 | 4 | 1 | 2007–2011 | 20–25 |
| 7 | (Netherlands) Bas Lammers | 9 (Note: Lammers won a total of 10 international titles, one of which was before 2007—the FA European Championship in 2003.) | 0 | 2 | 2 | 2009–2019 | 23–34 |
| 7 | (Italy) Riccardo Longhi | 9 | 0 | 0 | 1 | 2016–2023 | 21–29 |
| 10 | (Netherlands) Senna van Walstijn | 8 | 1 | 0 | 0 | 2020–2025 | 16–22 |
| 10 | (Italy) Andrea Kimi Antonelli† | 8 | 0 | 0 | 2 | 2018–2021 | 11–15 |
| 10 | (United Kingdom) Callum Ilott | 8 | 0 | 0 | 1 | 2012–2014 | 13–16 |
| 13 | (Netherlands) Jorrit Pex | 7 | 1 | 0 | 3 | 2011–2019 | 17–26 |
| 13 | (Belgium) Dries Van Langendonck | 7 | 1 | 0 | 1 | 2022–2025 | 11–15 |
| 13 | (Turkey) İskender Zülfikari | 7 | 0 | 0 | 0 | 2022–2025 | 10–14 |
| 16 | (Netherlands) Nyck de Vries*‡ | 6 | 2 | 0 | 1 | 2008–2011 | 12–16 |
| 16 | (Poland) Karol Basz | 6 | 1 | 1 | 0 | 2013–2016 | 21–25 |
| 16 | (Italy) Flavio Camponeschi | 6 | 1 | 0 | 2 | 2008–2015 | 15–23 |
| 16 | (United Kingdom) Freddie Slater | 6 | 1 | 0 | 2 | 2020–2023 | 11–15 |
| 16 | (Italy) Alessio Lorandi | 6 | 1 | 0 | 0 | 2013–2018 | 14–20 |
| 16 | (Italy) Davide Forè | 6 (Note: Forè won a total of 17 international titles, 11 of which were before 2007—including four World Championships, two World Cups, and two European Championships.) | 0 | 2 | 0 | 2008–2024 | 33–50 |
| 16 | (Kyrgyzstan) Maksim Orlov | 6 | 0 | 1 | 1 | 2024–2026 | 15–18 |
| 16 | (United Kingdom) Joe Turney | 6 | 0 | 0 | 1 | 2020–2024 | 18–23 |
| 23 | (Spain) Pedro Hiltbrand | 5 | 1 | 1 | 1 | 2016–2019 | 19–23 |
| 23 | (United Kingdom) Enaam Ahmed | 5 | 1 | 0 | 1 | 2014 | 13–14 |
| 23 | (Italy) Giuseppe Palomba | 5 | 1 | 0 | 0 | 2019–2024 | 17–23 |
| 23 | (United Kingdom) Noah Baglin | 5 | 1 | 0 | 0 | 2023–2025 | 10–13 |
| 23 | (Monaco) Charles Leclerc* | 5 | 0 | 1 | 0 | 2010–2013 | 12–16 |
| 23 | (France) Anthony Abbasse | 5 | 0 | 1 | 0 | 2007–2024 | 17–35 |
| 23 | (Finland) Aaro Vainio | 5 | 0 | 0 | 2 | 2007–2009 | 13–16 |
| 23 | (Netherlands) René Lammers | 5 | 0 | 0 | 1 | 2020–2023 | 11–15 |
| 23 | (Russia) (Italy) Daniil Kvyat* | 5 | 0 | 0 | 0 | 2008–2009 | 13–15 |
| 23 | (United Kingdom) Taylor Barnard | 5 | 0 | 0 | 0 | 2018–2020 | 13–16 |
| 23 | (Italy) Nicolas Marchesi | 5 | 0 | 0 | 0 | 2024–2026 | 14–17 |
| 23 | (Italy) Niccolò Perico | 5 | 0 | 0 | 0 | 2025–2026 | 11–13 |

Last updated on 22 March 2026.

=== Under-16 champions ===
The following is a list of drivers with at least five titles in international kart racing since 2007, up to and including the year they turned 16—the minimum age to compete in Formula 4 and Formula Renault 2.0 throughout the span.

Under-16 champions
| # | Driver | Titles | World | | Euro | Span | Age |
| # | Driver | Titles | Cha | Cup | Euro | Span | Age |
|---|---|---|---|---|---|---|---|
| 1 | (Netherlands) Max Verstappen† | 13 | 1 | 0 | 2 | 2010–2013 | 12–16 |
| 2 | (Italy) Andrea Kimi Antonelli† | 8 | 0 | 0 | 2 | 2018–2021 | 11–15 |
| 2 | (United Kingdom) Callum Ilott | 8 | 0 | 0 | 1 | 2012–2014 | 13–16 |
| 4 | (Belgium) Dries Van Langendonck | 7 | 1 | 0 | 1 | 2022–2025 | 11–15 |
| 4 | (Turkey) İskender Zülfikari | 7 | 0 | 0 | 0 | 2022–2025 | 10–14 |
| 6 | (Netherlands) Nyck de Vries*‡ | 6 | 2 | 0 | 1 | 2008–2011 | 12–16 |
| 6 | (United Kingdom) Freddie Slater | 6 | 1 | 0 | 2 | 2020–2023 | 11–15 |
| 8 | (United Kingdom) Enaam Ahmed | 5 | 1 | 0 | 1 | 2014 | 13–14 |
| 8 | (United Kingdom) Noah Baglin | 5 | 1 | 0 | 0 | 2023–2025 | 10–13 |
| 8 | (Monaco) Charles Leclerc* | 5 | 0 | 1 | 0 | 2010–2013 | 12–16 |
| 8 | (Finland) Aaro Vainio | 5 | 0 | 0 | 2 | 2007–2009 | 13–16 |
| 8 | (Netherlands) René Lammers | 5 | 0 | 0 | 1 | 2020–2023 | 11–15 |
| 8 | (Russia) (Italy) Daniil Kvyat* | 5 | 0 | 0 | 0 | 2008–2009 | 13–15 |
| 8 | (United Kingdom) Taylor Barnard | 5 | 0 | 0 | 0 | 2018–2020 | 13–16 |
| 8 | (Italy) Niccolò Perico | 5 | 0 | 0 | 0 | 2025–2026 | 11–13 |

Last updated on 22 March 2026.

== By nationality ==
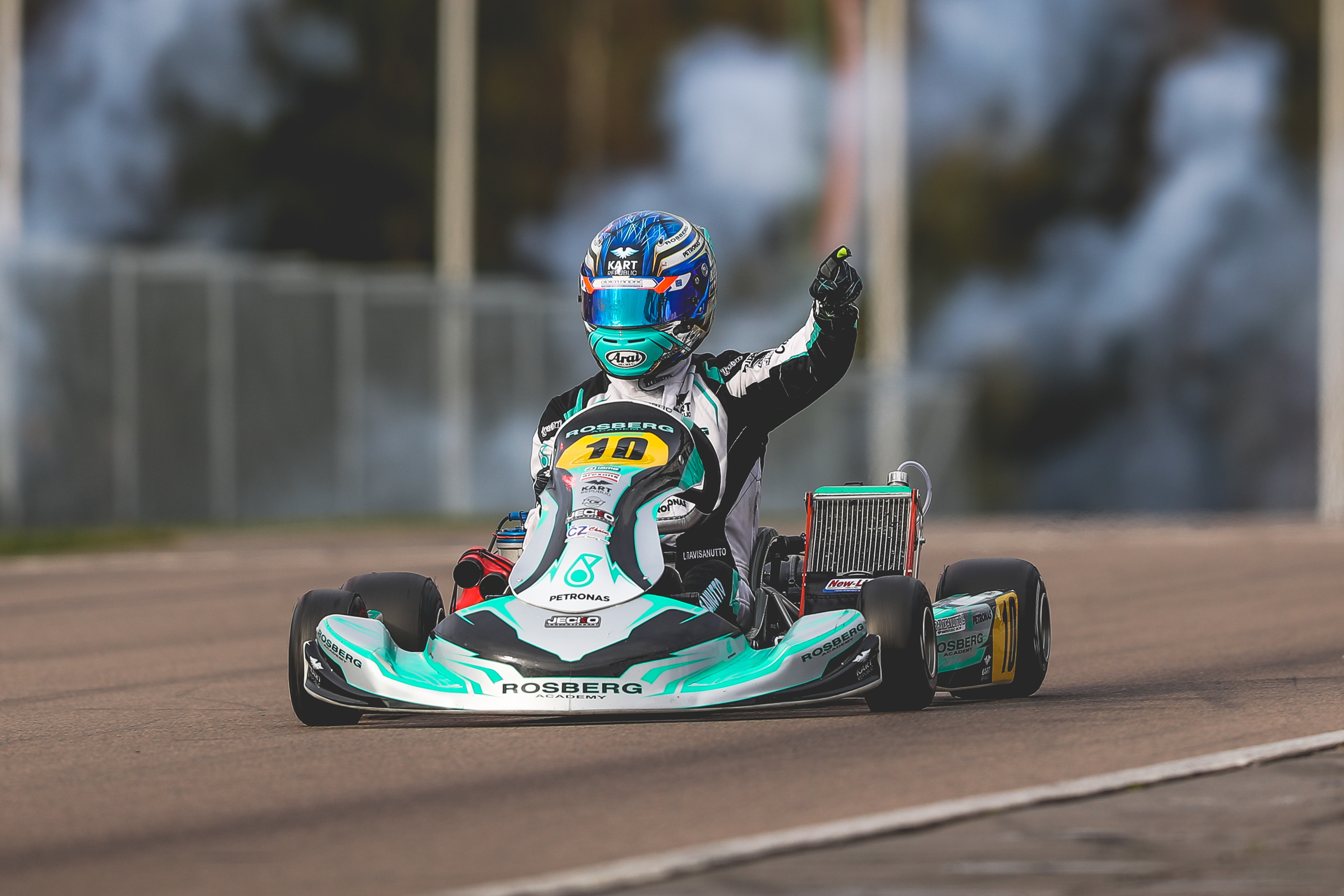
Italian drivers have won 201 international titles since 2007, pictured is Lorenzo Travisanutto winning the World OK Championship in 2018.

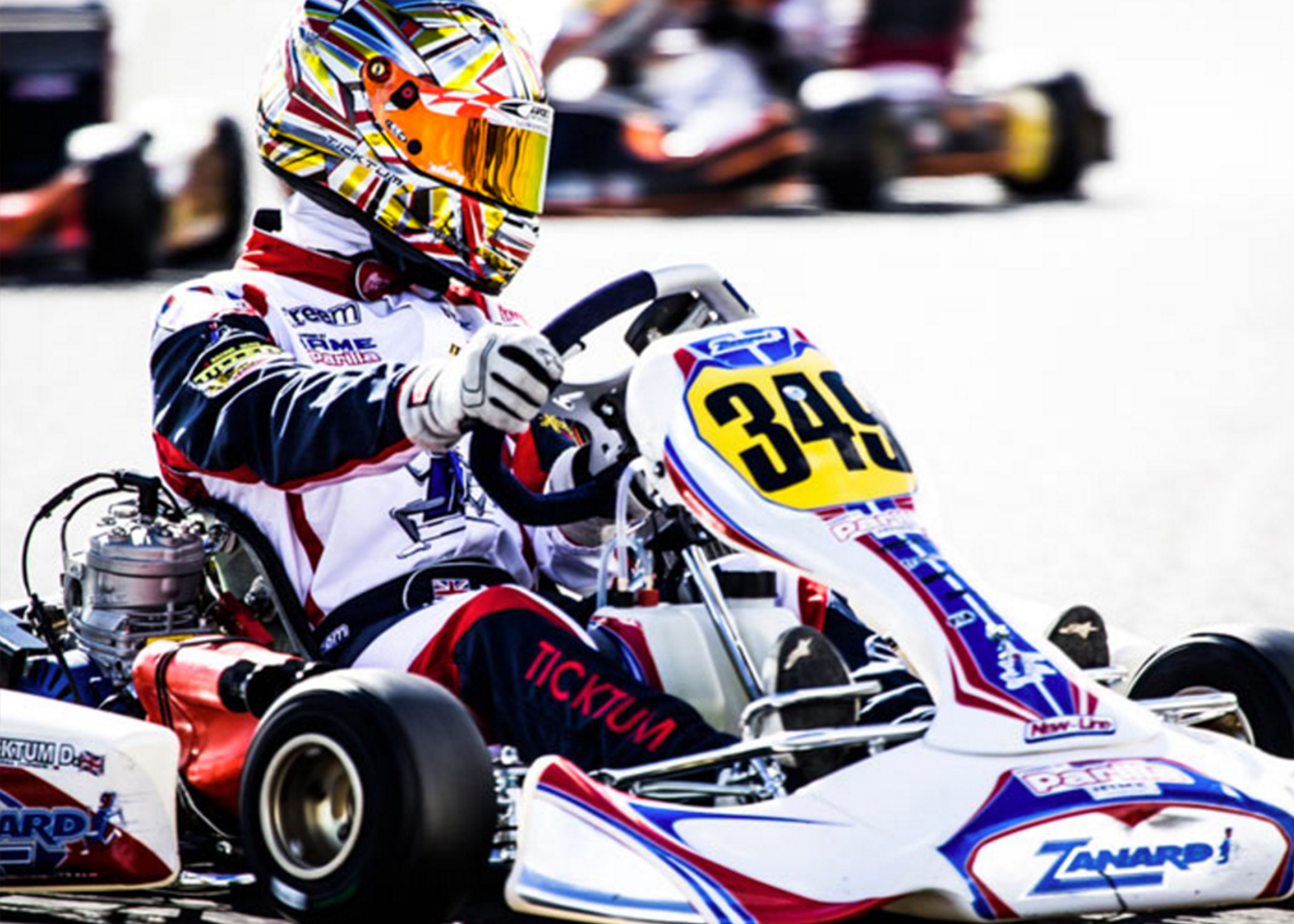
British drivers have won 113 international titles since 2007, pictured is Dan Ticktum at the South Garda Winter Cup in 2014.

By nationality
| # | Country | Titles | World | | Euro |
| # | Country | Titles | Cha | Cup | Euro |
|---|---|---|---|---|---|
| 1 | Italy | 201 | 11 | 15 | 23 |
| 2 | United Kingdom | 113 | 13 | 6 | 21 |
| 3 | Netherlands | 72 | 7 | 5 | 12 |
| 4 | France | 45 | 4 | 6 | 9 |
| 5 | Belgium | 29 | 2 | 4 | 4 |
| 6 | Denmark | 27 | 0 | 0 | 2 |
| 7 | Russia | 26 | 0 | 0 | 0 |
| 8 | Sweden | 23 | 2 | 0 | 3 |
| 9 | Spain | 21 | 1 | 1 | 2 |
| 10 | Finland | 17 | 1 | 0 | 2 |
| 11 | Poland | 16 | 1 | 1 | 0 |
| 11 | Germany | 16 | 0 | 1 | 6 |
| — | Neutral (Note: Following the Russian invasion of Ukraine in 2022, the FIA banned competitors from racing under the Russian and Belarusian flags; they may compete neutrally or under a different licence.) | 13 | 1 | 1 | 2 |
| 13 | Czech Republic | 11 | 1 | 0 | 2 |
| 14 | United States | 10 | 1 | 0 | 1 |
| 15 | Japan | 8 | 1 | 0 | 0 |
| 15 | Turkey | 8 | 0 | 0 | 0 |
| 17 | Norway | 7 | 0 | 0 | 1 |
| 17 | Romania | 7 | 0 | 0 | 0 |
| 19 | Ukraine | 6 | 0 | 0 | 1 |
| 20 | Brazil | 5 | 1 | 0 | 0 |
| 20 | Monaco | 5 | 0 | 1 | 0 |
| 20 | Estonia | 5 | 0 | 0 | 1 |
| 20 | Lithuania | 5 | 0 | 0 | 1 |
| 20 | Austria | 5 | 0 | 0 | 0 |
| 25 | Switzerland | 4 | 0 | 0 | 0 |
| 25 | Australia | 4 | 0 | 0 | 0 |
| 27 | Latvia | 3 | 0 | 0 | 0 |
| 27 | United Arab Emirates | 3 | 0 | 0 | 0 |
| 29 | Thailand | 2 | 1 | 0 | 0 |
| 29 | Morocco | 2 | 0 | 0 | 1 |
| 29 | India | 2 | 0 | 0 | 0 |
| 29 | Croatia | 2 | 0 | 0 | 0 |
| 29 | Colombia | 2 | 0 | 0 | 0 |
| 29 | Jamaica | 2 | 0 | 0 | 0 |
| 29 | Peru | 2 | 0 | 0 | 0 |
| 36 | Portugal | 1 | 0 | 1 | 0 |
| 36 | South Korea | 1 | 0 | 1 | 0 |
| 36 | Ireland | 1 | 0 | 0 | 0 |
| 36 | Hungary | 1 | 0 | 0 | 0 |
| 36 | Canada | 1 | 0 | 0 | 0 |
| 36 | Indonesia | 1 | 0 | 0 | 0 |
| 36 | Bulgaria | 1 | 0 | 0 | 0 |
| 36 | Singapore | 1 | 0 | 0 | 0 |
| 36 | China | 1 | 0 | 0 | 0 |
| 36 | Kyrgyzstan | 1 | 0 | 0 | 0 |
| 36 | Malta | 1 | 0 | 0 | 0 |

Last updated on 22 March 2026.

== See also ==
- List of kart racing championships
- International Karting Ranking
