= List of kart racing championships =

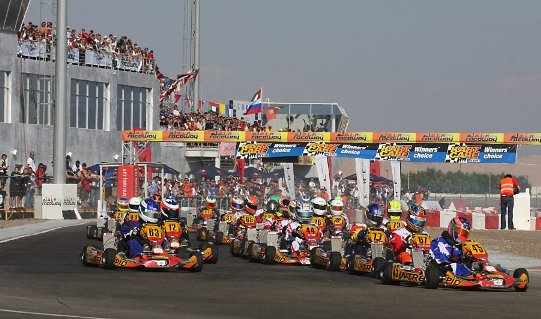
Final of the RMC Grand Finals in 2007

The following is a list of kart racing championships. International championships have been held in kart racing since 1964, when the Karting World Championship was inaugurated by the CIK-FIA.

== International championships ==
International kart racing is sanctioned by the Commission Internationale de Karting (CIK-FIA). On application to the CIK-FIA by the organiser, a championship may be granted international-status if it is held to the homologation standard set by the CIK-FIA for karts, classes, circuits, and format.

=== Active international championships ===
As of 2026, there are 14 active international championships in CIK-FIA classes, five in Rotax classes, and two in Italian American Motor Engineering (IAME) classes, with 59 titles awarded annually:

CIK-FIA events

- CIK-FIA World Championship (1964–present; OK, OK-J, KZ)
  - CIK-FIA World Cup (1968–present; KZ2, OK-N, OKN-J, A&D-S, A&D-J)
  - CIK-FIA International Super Cup (2011–present; KZ2-M)
- CIK-FIA European Championship (1970–present; OK, OK-J, KZ, KZ2, A&D-S, A&D-J)
- CIK-FIA Asia-Pacific Championship (1976–present; A&D-S, A&D-J)
- CIK-FIA South American Championship (1976–present; A&D-S, A&D-J)
- CIK-FIA Academy Trophy (2010–present; Academy-S, Academy-J)

WSK Promotion events

- WSK Final Cup (2010–present; OK, OK-J, KZ2)
- WSK Euro Series (2010–present; OK, OK-J, KZ2)
- WSK Super Master Series (2010–present; OK, OK-J, KZ2)

RGMMC Group events

- Champions of the Future Euro Series (2020–present; OK, OK-J, OK-N, OKN-J)
- Champions of the Future Academy Program (2023–present; OK-N, OKN-J)

Parma Motorsport events

- Andrea Margutti Trophy (1994–present; KZ2)
- Trofeo delle Industrie (1997–present; OK-J, KZ2)

Rotax Max Challenge

- RMC Grand Finals (DD2, Senior Max, Junior Max)
- RMC International Trophy (DD2, DD2M, Senior Max, Junior Max)
- RMC Euro Trophy (DD2, DD2M, Senior Max, Junior Max)
- RMC Winter Cup (DD2, Senior Max, Junior Max)
- RMC Central Europe (DD2, DD2M, Senior Max, Junior Max)

IAME Series

- IAME Euro Series (X30-S, X30-J)
- IAME Winter Cup (X30-S, X30-J)

=== Former international championships ===
CIK-FIA

- CIK-FIA North American Championship
- CIK-FIA Oceania Championship
- CIK-FIA Monaco Kart Cup (1995–2010)
- CIK-FIA Viking Trophy

WSK

- WSK Night Edition (2015–2016)

RGMMC

- Champions of the Future Winter Series (2022)
- Champions of the Future Shifters (2024–2025)

Parma

- South Garda Winter Cup (–2023)

International Kart Grands Prix

- Hong Kong (1976–1992)
- Japan (1977–1999)
- Australia (–1986)
- (Soviet Union) USSR (1989)
- Macau (–2022)

ASNs

- (Germany) Deutsche Kart-Meisterschaft (–2025)
- (Italy) Italian Championship (–2020)
- (Belgium) Belgian Championship (–2010)

Unique events

- Road to the World Cup (2023)
- Road to Wackersdorf (2023)
- Road to Mülsen (2025)

== World championships ==
- FIA Karting World Championship (1964–present)
  - FIA Superkart World Championship (1983–1995)
- FIA Karting Academy Trophy (2010–present)
- FIA Motorsport Games (2019–present)
- FIA Karting Arrive-and-Drive World Cup (2025–present)
- WSK Final Cup (2010–present), previously the WSK Nations Cup
- Champions of the Future Academy Program (2023–present)
- Rotax Max Challenge (2000–present)
- IAME Warrior Final (2021–present)
- Sodi World Series (2011–present)
- WSK World Series (2006–2010), previously the WSK International Series
- International IAME Games (2007–2022), previously the Bruno Grana International Trophy, the IAME International Challenge, and the IAME International Final
- Summer Youth Olympics (2018; no medals awarded)

== Continental championships ==
=== Africa ===
- FIA African Karting Cup (2024–present)
- CIK-FIA All-African Championship (1981–1985)

=== Americas ===
- CIK-FIA Pan-American Championship (–2009)
- CIK-FIA North American Championship
- FIA Karting South American Championship
- WSK North American Series (2009)
- T4 Americas Cup (2026–present)
- Challenge of the Americas

=== Asia and Oceania ===
- FIA Karting Asia-Pacific Championship (1981–2013, 2015–2016, 2026–present), previously the CIK Asian Open Championship
- CIK-FIA Oceania Championship

=== Europe ===
- FIA Karting European Championship (1972–present)
  - FIA Superkart European Championship (2002–2019)
- WSK Super Master Series (2010–present), previously the WSK Master Series
- WSK Euro Series (2010–2013, 2019–present)
- IAME Euro Series (2016–present)
- Champions of the Future Euro Series (2020–present), previously Champions of the Future
- Champions of the Future Shifters (2024–present)
- International Deutsche Kart-Meisterschaft (2024–present)
- CIK-FIA European Nations' Championship (1963–1976)
- CIK-FIA Viking Trophy (1990–2012)
- WSK Open Series (2018–2024), previously the WSK Open Cup
- WSK Champions Cup (2014–2024)
- WSK Super Cup (2022–2024)
- Bridgestone Cup (2005–2012)
- WSK Silver Cup (2008, 2012)
- WSK Night Edition (2015–2016)

=== Middle East ===
- MENA Karting Championship Nations Cup (2020–present)

== National championships ==
=== Australia ===
- Australian Kart Championship (1963–present), formerly the Australian National Sprint Kart Championships
- City of Melbourne Titles (1985–present)
- Australian Superkart Championship (1989–present)

=== Belgium ===
- Belgian National Championship

=== Benelux ===
- BNL Karting Series (2008–present)

=== Brazil ===
- Campeonato Brasileiro de Kart (1964–present)

=== Canada ===
- Canadian Karting Championship (1999–present)

=== China ===
- China Karting Championship (1997–present)

=== Finland ===
- Finnish Karting Championship

=== France ===
- French Karting Championship
- Coupe de France
- Grand Prix Open Karting
- National Series Karting (2012–present)

=== Germany ===
National championships

- Deutsche Kart-Meisterschaft (1962–present)
- ADAC Kart Masters (2008–2023, 2026–present)
- ADAC Kart Bundesendlauf (–2019, 2021–present)
- IAME Series Germany (2011–2025)

Regional championships

- IAME Series Germany (2026–present)

=== Hong Kong ===
- Hong Kong International Kart Grand Prix (1967–1992)

=== Italy ===
- Italian ACI Karting Championship (1961–present), previously the Italian Open Masters and the Italian Open Karting Championship

=== Lebanon ===
- IAME Series Lebanon (2018–present)

=== Lithuania ===
- Lithuanian Karting Championship (1962–present)

=== Macau ===
- Macao International Kart Grand Prix
- AAMC Karting Championship

=== Netherlands ===
- Dutch Championship
- Tillotson T4 Series Netherlands (2020–present)

=== Norway ===
- Norwegian Karting Championship

=== Portugal ===
- Portuguese Karting Championship (2007–present)

=== Spain ===
- Spanish Karting Championship (1970–present)

=== Sweden ===
- Swedish Karting Championship

=== Thailand ===
- Kart Championship of Thailand (1987–present)
- Superkart Thailand (1997–present)

=== Turkey ===
- Turkish Karting Championship (2001–2014)

=== United Arab Emirates ===
- UAE RMC (2005–present), previously the AARKC UAE Rotax Mojo Max Challenge
- IAME Series UAE (2015–present), previously the X30 Challenge UAE
- UAE Talent Championship (2026–present)

=== United Kingdom ===
- British Kart Championships (2019–present)
- Super 1 National Kart Championships (1983–present)
- Kartmasters British Grand Prix (1996–present)
- British Superkart Championship
- Club100 (1993–present)
- British Universities Karting Championship (2001–present)
- British Schools Karting Championship (2003–present)
- Armed Forces Karting Championship (2009–present), previously the RAF Kart Championship and the Inter-Service Kart Championship
- Formula Kart Stars (1996–2016)

=== United States ===
National championships

- IKF Grand Nationals (1960–present)
- SKUSA SuperNationals (1997–present)
- Florida Winter Tour (1999–present)
- SKUSA Pro Tour (2010–present)
- United States Pro Kart Series (2013–present)
- SKUSA Winter Series (2018–present)
- Stars Championship Series (2020–present)
- Champions of the Future America Series (2026–present)
- ROK Cup USA
- RMC US Trophy Final
- RMC Winter Trophy
- RMC America's Trophy (2026–present)

Regional championships

- Route 66 Sprint Series (1990s–present)
- Rock Island Grand Prix (1996–present)
- Cup Karts North America (2015–present)
- Sunshine State Karting Challenge (2018–present)
- T4 Series USA
  - Texas Sprint Racing Series (2016–present)
  - T4 Eastern Cup (2026–present)
  - Florida Karting Championship (2026–present)
- ROK Sonoma
- ROK Vegas
- ROK the Rockies

Former championships

- GPKCA World Championship (1959–1961)

== Other championships ==
- (Brazil) Desafio Internacional das Estrelas (2005–2014)
- (United Kingdom) (United States) FAT Karting League (2021–present)
- (United States) Florida Winter Tour
- (France) Masters of Paris-Bercy (1993–2011)
  - (France) Elf Masters (1993–2001)
  - (France) ERDF Masters Kart (2011)
- CIK-FIA Monaco Kart Cup (1995–2010)
- (Greece) Patras International Circuit for Kart (2009–present)
- (Italy) South Garda Winter Cup (1996–2023)
- (Italy) Andrea Margutti Trophy (1990–present)
- (Italy) Trofeo delle Industrie (1971–present)
- (Colombia) Race of Stars (2003–2013)
- (United States) Purdue Grand Prix (1958–present)
- (United States) Electric Vehicle Grand Prix (2010–present)

== See also ==
- Commission Internationale de Karting (CIK-FIA) – the primary governing body for international kart racing
- List of international kart racing champions
- Kart racing
