= OK-N =

International kart racing class

- Category: Kart racing
- Region: International
- Affiliations: CIK-FIA
- Inaugural season: 2023; 3 years ago
- Drivers' champion: (Italy) Manuel Scognamiglio; (World Cup, 2025)
- Constructors' champion: (Italy) Kart Republic-IAME; (World Cup, 2025)
- Official website: FIA Karting

OK-National (OK-N) is an international kart racing class sanctioned by the Commission Internationale de Karting (CIK-FIA) for drivers aged 14 and over. Debuting in international competition in 2023, OK-N is the secondary senior class in FIA championships to OK.

Approved by the FIA World Motor Sport Council in 2022, OK-N was designed as a simplified version of OK regulations to reduce costs for competitors. The class debuted in international competition the following year, being contested in several championships across Europe and the Middle East.

Its inaugural World Cup was held in 2024—with qualifying decided via national championships held in 12 countries—and won by Kyuho Lee. The Arrive & Drive World Cup hosted its first edition in 2025, using a modified OK-N engine in a single-design format.

== History ==
=== Background (1962–2022) ===
The Commission Internationale de Karting (CIK-FIA) was founded in 1962 as a sister commission to the CSI, later known as FISA and the FIA, to govern international kart racing competitions. It hosted the first CIK-FIA World Championship in 1964, which has been held annually since. The CIK-FIA began its homologation of distinct classes in the discipline in 1974, when the first 125 cc gearbox category was created for the European Championship: Formula C (FC). The 100 cc category was homologated in 1976, when Formula Europe was introduced to control technical evolutions and costs. The direct-drive classes were adapted in 1981, when the 135 cc Formula K (FK), 100 cc Intercontinental A (ICA), and Junior Intercontinental A (ICA-J) were introduced to the World Championship, European Championship, and World Cup, respectively. Component technical approvals have been mandated by the CIK-FIA since then. The 250 cc superkart category received World Championship–status in 1983, having reached international competition as early as 1976.

Senior classes have evolved substantially since 1981. Formula Super 100, later known as Formula A (FA), was introduced in 1988 as an additional World Championship class to FK, which was replaced by Formula Super A (FSA) in 1993. FSA was disbanded after 2002 and was followed by FA and ICA in 2007, when 125 cc KF1 and KF2 regulations were introduced. The KF era was marked by decreasing entry figures as costs for competitors spiralled due to the presence of manually-controlled front brakes, sophisticated cable systems, and fragility of components. It was eventually replaced by Original Kart (OK) in 2016, which—following iterations by the CIK-FIA—offered improved performance, reduced weight, and increased competition by eliminating the centrifugal clutch, complex cabling, and starter motor, with later reductions to the rev limiter and exhaust valve; after six years, it was deemed ready to expand into national championships.

CIK-FIA senior class timeline in kart racing
Category	1964–	1970s	1980s	1990s	2000s		2010s		2020s
100 cc									
Formula									
Formula			FK						
Formula			ICA						
Formula			FS100	FA					
Formula				FSA					
KF									
KF					KF1	SKF	KF1		
KF					KF2			KF	
OK									
OK									OK
OK									OK-N
Category									
Category	1964–	1970s	1980s	1990s	2000s		2010s		2020s

Key
Both World and European titles held.
Only World title held.
Only European title held.
Only active in other international competitions.
World Championship held.
Both World Championship and World Cup / International Super Cup held.
Only World Cup / International Super Cup held.

=== Creation ===
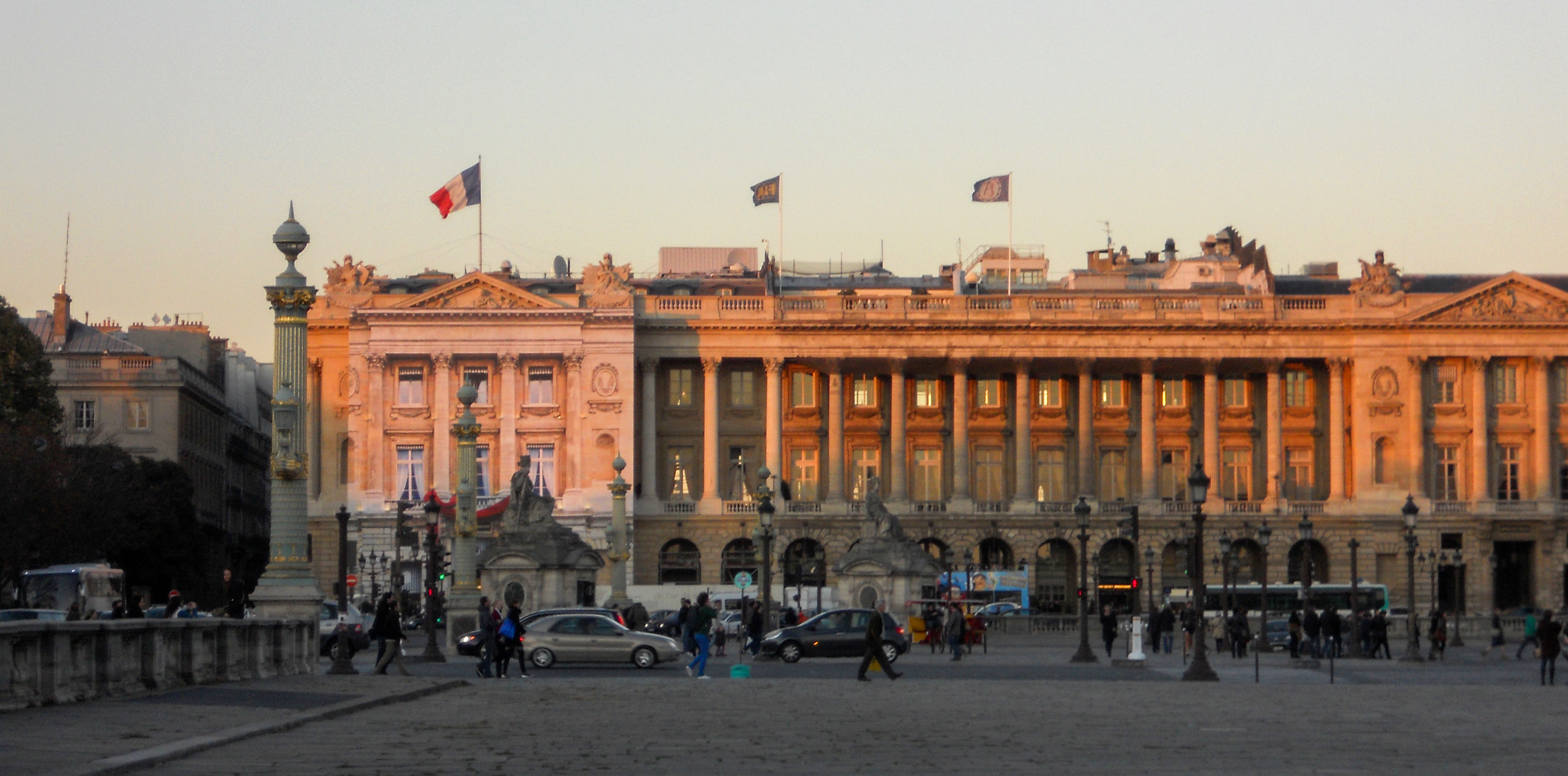
The OK-N concept was approved by the FIA World Motor Sport Council in 2022.

Plans for a new minimal-cost direct-drive category were submitted by the CIK-FIA to the FIA World Motor Sport Council in 2022; they were approved in July, with the CIK-FIA confirming the "OK-N" category would host its inaugural World Cup in 2024. The "N" suffix is an initialism of National, reflecting that qualification for the World Cup would be determined via national events. Described as a "hybrid" between the OK and OK-Junior categories, OK-N engines were first tested in the final round of the European Championship that year at Franciacorta.

OK-N was unveiled alongside its junior category, OKN-Junior, utilising a lower rev limiter to increase reliability and a higher minimum weight to reduce costs and bolster accessibility; additionally, CIK-FIA events were planned to operate as a single-manufacturer discipline, with one brand of engine, chassis, and six option tyres. ACI Sport carried out further tests at Sarno and Cremona, in preparation for both categories' debuts in the Italian Championship, where they would serve as a gateway from the under-12 Mini Gr.3 class to OK.

=== Competitive beginnings and World Cup debut (2023–2025) ===
National championships held in qualification for the inaugural OK-N World Cup in 2024

The class debuted internationally in 2023, featuring in the Champions of the Future Academy Program (COTFA), the WSK Euro Series, and the WSK Final Cup. Its debut was postponed from February to June, removed from the WSK Super Master Series, and had only one entry in the WSK Open Series, which Kartcom opined was "more a casting error than a failure of the new concept". The COTFA was won by Luna Fluxá the following year, who became the fifth woman in history to win a major senior international karting title, (Note: Luna Fluxá became the fifth woman in history to win a major senior international karting title, after: Susanna Raganelli, World Championship, 1966; Cathy Muller, European Championship, 100 cc, 1979; Sophie Kumpen, Andrea Margutti Trophy, FA, 1995; Beitske Visser, WSK Master Series, KZ2, 2010; Cyndie Allemann also won the CIK-FIA Green Helmet Trophy in 1999, with Marta García winning the Academy Trophy and Trofeo delle Industrie in 2015, all in junior classes.) and the first in a global championship since Susanna Raganelli in 1966. It featured that year as the primary senior class in the Andrea Margutti Trophy and Trofeo delle Industrie. The Road to the World Cup, organised by ACI Sport, was held at Franciacorta as a support race to the 2023 World Championship and was won by Antonio Apicella. In addition to this event—where the top-three were awarded places at the World Cup—qualification was decided via national championships in 12 countries, (Note: Qualification for the 2023 World Cup was awarded to the top-two finishers in the national championships of Brazil, China, Cyprus, Germany, Hungary, Italy, Lithuania, Mexico, Poland, South Africa, and Uzbekistan, as well as the top-three in France; five additional places were awarded in proportion with the entry count of each championship.) as well as the podium of the African Cup, for a total of 36 drivers.

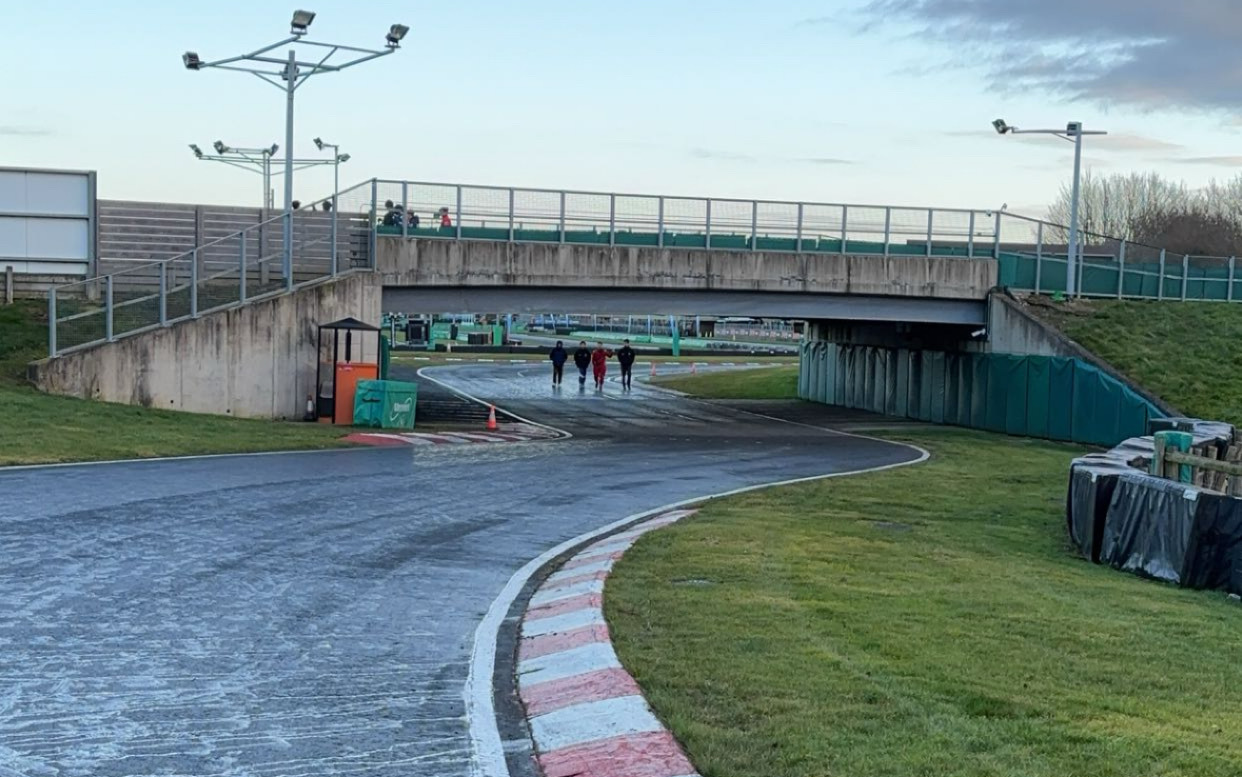
The inaugural OK-N World Cup was held at PF International in 2024.

The inaugural World Cup was held at PF International and won by South Korean driver Kyuho Lee in wet conditions. Entries to the World Cup were initially tightened for 2025, with each National Sporting Authority (ASN) hosting a national championship given three entries and the exclusion of all European Championship entrants. The Arrive & Drive World Cup was inaugurated that year at LYL International in Malaysia, featuring Vortex engines derived from OK-N with centrifugal clutches, and was won by Zach Tucker of New Zealand against 58 competitors from 30 nations. In the Italian Championship, average entry numbers in OK-N and OKN-J increased from 70 in 2023, to 90 in 2024, to 120 in 2025; a record 190 entered the 2025 Cremona round in preparation for the World Cup. With the increased demand from ASNs, the World Cup increased from the planned 72 drivers to 90 and was dominated by Italy's Manuel Scognamiglio.

=== Global expansion (2026–present) ===
In 2026, OK-N is set to be contested at three national championships within the COTFA framework in Macau, the United Arab Emirates, and the United Kingdom. As part of the FIA's phased "Global Karting Plan", the arrive-and-drive concept is set to expand to European and Asia-Pacific Championships.

== Specification ==
=== Technical regulations ===
There are 16 main technical features of the OK-N regulations:

- 125 cc, direct-drive, single-cylinder, two-stroke, mixed-lubrication, reed valve engine;
- Single cooling circuit for the crankcase, cylinder, and head;
- Exhaust port with a maximum angle of 194°;
- Combustion chamber with a minimum volume of 10 cc;
- Mandatory decompression valve;
- Monotype power valve;
- Maximum lubricant–fuel mixture of 4%;
- 30 mm (1.2 in) floating chamber carburettor or 24 mm (0.94 in) butterfly carburettor, decided by the governing ASN;
- Two-duct 23 mm (0.91 in) intake silencer;
- Digital ignition system with rev limiter of 15,000 rpm;
- Monotype exhaust with silencer;
- Type-219 chains and sprockets;
- Radiator with one cooling circuit;
- 2WP B2 or BRKR single rear brake with hydraulic control;
- Prime tyres, medium gum compound;
- Minimum weight of 155 kg (342 lb) with driver, 70 kg (150 lb) without.

Engines, chassis, bodywork, brakes, and tyres are subject to the homologation and approval system operated by the CIK-FIA. Each year, the specific tyres and fuel for use in competition are selected after a call for tenders. With elimination of the clutch, electric starter, battery, and electrical wiring, TKART described the OK-N regulations as being "as simple as it gets". Competitors are mandated to hold either an F-grade or an E-grade International Karting Licence issued by their ASN, requiring drivers to be aged 14 or over.

==== Arrive & Drive World Cup specification ====
The Arrive & Drive World Cup features an arrive-and-drive format using OK-N engines fitted with a centrifugal clutch.

Year	Circuit	Chassis	Engine	Tyres	Ref
2025	(Malaysia) LYL International	(Italy) Kosmic	(Italy) Vortex	V	

=== Engine manufacturers ===
As of 2025, six engines are homologated for use in OK-N by the CIK-FIA, manufactured by Modena, IAME, Rexon, LKE, Vortex, and TM:

Applicant	Brand	Model	Homolog No
(Italy) ASPA Srl	Modena Engines	ME-K	032-EN-17
(Italy) IAME SpA SU	IAME	Reedster 5	040-EN-66
(Germany) Karlheinz Hahn	Rexon Motors	Primaballerina	035-EN-17
(Italy) Lenzokart Srl	LKE	LK2	033-EN-20
(Italy) OTK Kart Group Srl	Vortex	VTS	012-EN-11
(Italy) TM Racing SpA	TM Kart	S3-Senior	041-EN-03

== Champions ==
Key
Drivers
*	Driver has competed in Formula One		
†	Formula One World Drivers' Champion		
‡	FIA World Champion in an auto racing discipline		
Tyres
B	Bridgestone	L	LeCont
C	Carlisle	M	Maxxis
D	Dunlop	M	MG Tires
G	Goodyear	M	Mojo
K	Komet	V	Vega

=== By year ===
Year	World Cup				Arrive & Drive			Year
Year	Winner	Chassis	Engine	Tyres	World Cup	European	Asia-Pacific	Year
2023	OK-N regulations created for the World Cup							2023
2024	(South Korea) Kyuho Lee	(Italy) LN Kart	(Italy) IAME	M				2024
2025	OK-N mandated at the Arrive & Drive World Cup							2025
2025	(Italy) Manuel Scognamiglio	(Italy) Kart Republic	(Italy) IAME	M	(New Zealand) Zach Tucker			2025
2026	To be determined				To be determined			2026
Year	Winner	Chassis	Engine	Tyres	World Cup	European	Asia-Pacific	Year
Year	World Cup				Arrive & Drive			Year

== See also ==
- OK – the primary senior class
- OK-Junior – the primary junior class
- KZ – the primary gearbox class
- KZ2 – the secondary gearbox class
- KZ2-Masters – the senior gearbox class
- OKN-Junior – the secondary junior class
- 60 Mini – the under-12 class
- Superkart – 250 cc gearbox class
- KF1 – the primary senior class from 2007 to 2012
