= OKN-Junior =

International kart racing class

- Category: Kart racing
- Region: International
- Affiliations: CIK-FIA
- Inaugural season: 2023; 3 years ago
- Official website: FIA Karting

OKN-Junior (Note: Also written as OK-N Junior (OK-NJ).) (OKN-J) is a kart racing class sanctioned by the CIK-FIA for drivers aged 12 to 14. Debuting in international competition in 2023, OKN-J is the secondary junior direct-drive class in FIA championships.

Approved by the FIA World Motor Sport Council in 2022, OKN-J was designed as a simplified version of OK-Junior regulations to reduce costs for competitors. The class debuted in international competition the following year, being contested in several championships across Europe and the Middle East.

Its inaugural World Cup is due to be held in 2025—with qualifying decided via national championships held in various countries. The Arrive & Drive World Cup is also set to host its first edition in 2025, using a modified OKN-J engine in a single-design format.

== History ==
=== Background (1962–2022) ===
The Commission Internationale de Karting (CIK-FIA) was founded in 1962 as a sister commission to the CSI, later known as FISA and the FIA, to govern international kart racing competition. It hosted the first CIK-FIA World Championship in 1964, which has been held annually since. The CIK-FIA began its homologation of distinct classes in the discipline in 1974, when the first 125 cc gearbox category was created for the European Championship: Formula C (FC). The 100 cc direct-drive category was clarified in 1976, when Formula Europe was introduced to control technical evolutions and costs. The direct-drive classes were adapted in 1981, when the 135 cc Formula K (FK), 100 cc Intercontinental A (ICA), and Junior Intercontinental A (ICA-J) were introduced to the World Championship, European Championship, and World Cup, respectively. Component technical approvals have been mandated by the CIK-FIA since then. The 250 cc superkart category received World Championship–status in 1983, having reached international competition as early as 1976.

Junior direct-drive classes have evolved substantially since 1981. ICA-J was introduced to the European Championship in 1989 and remained at the World Cup until 1996, where notable winners included two Formula One World Drivers' Champions: Alain Prost (1973) and Fernando Alonso (1996). In 2007, it was replaced by 125 cc KF3 regulations, later known as KF-Junior (KF-J). The KF era was marked by decreasing entry figures as costs for competitors spiralled due to the presence of manually-controlled front brakes, sophisticated cable systems, and fragility of components. It was eventually replaced by OK-Junior (OK-J) in 2016, which—following iterations by the CIK-FIA—offered improved performance, reduced weight, and increased competition by eliminating the centrifugal clutch, complex cabling, and starter motor, with later reductions to the rev limiter and exhaust valve; after six years, it was deemed ready to expand into national championships.

CIK-FIA junior class timeline in kart racing
Category	1968–	1970s	1980s	1990s	2000s	2010s	2020s
100 cc							
Formula							
Formula			ICA-J				
KF							
KF					KF3	KF-J	
OK							
OK							OK-J
OK							OKN-J
Category							
Category	1968–	1970s	1980s	1990s	2000s	2010s	2020s

Key
Both World and European titles held.
Only World title held.
Only European title held.
Only active in other international competitions.
World Championship held.
Both World Championship and World Cup / International Super Cup held.
Only World Cup / International Super Cup held.

=== Creation ===
Plans for a new minimal-cost direct-drive category were submitted by the CIK-FIA to the FIA World Motor Sport Council in 2022; they were approved in July, with the CIK-FIA confirming the "OK-N" category would host its inaugural World Cup in 2024. The "N" suffix is an initialism of National, reflecting that qualification for the World Cup would be determined via national events. Described as a "hybrid" between the OK and OK-Junior categories, OK-N engines were first tested in the final round of the European Championship that year at Franciacorta.

OKN-Junior (OKN-J) was unveiled alongside the senior category, utilising a lower rev limiter to increase reliability and a higher minimum weight to reduce costs and bolster accessibility; additionally, CIK-FIA events were to operate as a single-manufacturer discipline, with one brand of engine, chassis, and six option tyres. OKN-J uses an identical design to the OK-N engine, with the only technical difference being a 26 mm (1.0 in) flange on the exhaust. ACI Sport carried out further tests at Sarno and Cremona, in preparation for both categories' debuts in the Italian Championship, where they would serve as a gateway from Mini Gr.3 to OK.

=== Competitive beginnings and World Cup debut (2023–present) ===
The class debuted internationally in 2023, featuring in the Champions of the Future Academy Program (COTFA), WSK Euro Series, and WSK Final Cup. Its debut was postponed from February to June, removed from the WSK Super Master Series, and had only one entry in the WSK Open Series, which Kartcom opined was "more a casting error than a failure of the new concept". It featured the following year in both the Andrea Margutti Trophy and Trofeo delle Industrie. The Road to the World Cup, organised by ACI Sport, was held at Franciacorta as a support race to the 2023 World Championship and won by Jesse Phillips.

Qualification for the inaugural World Cup in 2025 was decided via national championships in several countries, as well as the podium of the African Cup, for a total of 72 drivers. Each National Sporting Authority (ASN) hosting a national championship were given three entries, with the exclusion of all European Championship entrants. The Arrive & Drive World Cup was inaugurated that year, featuring Vortex engines derived from OKN-J with centrifugal clutches. In the Italian Championship, average entry numbers in OK-N and OKN-J increased from 70 in 2023, to 90 in 2024, to 120 in 2025; a record 190 entered the 2025 Cremona round in preparation for the World Cup. With the increased demand from ASNs, the World Cup increased from 72 to 90 drivers.

== Specification ==
=== Technical regulations ===
There are 16 main technical features of the OKN-J regulations:

- 125 cc, direct-drive, single-cylinder, two-stroke, mixed-lubrication, reed valve engine;
- Single cooling circuit for the crankcase, cylinder, and head;
- Exhaust port with maximum angle of a 194°;
- Combustion chamber with a minimum volume of 10 cc;
- Mandatory decompression valve;
- Monotype power valve;
- Maximum lubricant–fuel mixture of 4%;
- 30 mm (1.2 in) floating chamber carburettor or 24 mm (0.94 in) butterfly carburettor, decided by the governing ASN;
- Two-duct 23 mm (0.91 in) intake silencer;
- Digital ignition system with rev limiter of 15,000 rpm;
- Monotype exhaust with 26 mm (1.0 in) flange and silencer;
- Type-219 chains and sprockets;
- Radiator with one cooling circuit;
- 2WP B2 or BRKR single rear brake with hydraulic control;
- Prime tyres, medium gum compound;
- Minimum weight of 145 kg (320 lb) with driver, 70 kg (150 lb) without.

The sole differences to the technical regulations of OK-N are the 10 kg (22 lb) minimum weight reduction and the exhaust flange. Engines, chassis, bodywork, brakes, and tyres are subject to the homologation and approval system operated by the CIK-FIA. Each year, the specific tyres and fuel for use in competition are selected after a call for tenders. With elimination of the clutch, electric starter, battery, and electrical wiring, TKART described the OKN-J regulations as being "as simple as it gets".

==== World Cup specification ====
The Road to the World Cup at Franciacorta in 2023 used Group 1 engines and chassis, and Vega XH3 option tyres.

Year	Circuit	Engine	Chassis	Tyres	Ref
2025	(Italy) Cremona	To be determined			

==== Arrive & Drive World Cup specification ====
The Arrive & Drive World Cup features an arrive-and-drive format using OKN-J engines fitted with a centrifugal clutch.

Year	Circuit	Chassis	Engine	Tyres	Ref
2025	(Malaysia) LYL International	(Italy) Kosmic	(Italy) Vortex	V	

=== Engine manufacturers ===
As of 2025, six engines are homologated for use in OKN-J by the CIK-FIA, manufactured by Modena, IAME, Rexon, LKE, Vortex, and TM:

Applicant	Brand	Model	Homolog No
(Italy) ASPA Srl	Modena Engines	ME-K	032-EN-17
(Italy) IAME SpA SU	IAME	Reedster 5	040-EN-66
(Germany) Karlheinz Hahn	Rexon Motors	Primaballerina	035-EN-17
(Italy) Lenzokart Srl	LKE	LK2	033-EN-20
(Italy) OTK Kart Group Srl	Vortex	VTS	012-EN-11
(Italy) TM Racing SpA	TM Kart	S3-Senior	041-EN-03

== Champions ==
Key
Drivers
*	Driver has competed in Formula One		
†	Formula One World Drivers' Champion		
‡	FIA World Champion in an auto racing discipline		
Tyres
B	Bridgestone	L	LeCont
C	Carlisle	M	Maxxis
D	Dunlop	M	MG Tires
G	Goodyear	M	Mojo
K	Komet	V	Vega

=== By year ===
Year	World Cup				Arrive & Drive World Cup				European Championship				Year
Year	Winner	Chassis	Engine	Tyres	Winner	Chassis	Engine	Tyres	European Champion	Chassis	Engine	Tyres	Year
2023	OKN-J regulations created for the World Cup												2023
2024	Not held								Not held				2024
2025	OKN-J mandated at the Arrive & Drive World Cup												2025
2025	To be determined				To be determined				Not held				2025
Year	Winner	Chassis	Engine	Tyres	Winner	Chassis	Engine	Tyres	European Champion	Chassis	Engine	Tyres	Year
Year	World Cup				Arrive & Drive World Cup				European Championship				Year

== See also ==
- OK – the primary direct-drive class
- OK-Junior – the primary junior direct-drive class
- KZ – the primary gearbox class
- KZ2 – the secondary gearbox class
- KZ2-Masters – the senior gearbox class
- OK-N – the secondary direct-drive class
- 60 Mini – the under-12 direct-drive class
- Superkart – 250 cc gearbox class
- KF1 – the primary direct-drive class from 2007 to 2012
