= Commission Internationale de Karting =

International kart racing governing body

- Abbreviation: CIK; CIK-FIA
- Formation: 1962; 64 years ago
- Purpose: Kart racing
- Headquarters: Geneva, Switzerland
- Region served: International
- Official language: English; French; Spanish
- President: (India) Akbar Ebrahim
- Vice-president: (United Kingdom) John Ryan
- Parent organization: Fédération Internationale de l'Automobile
- Website: Official website

The Commission Internationale de Karting (CIK; lit. 'International Karting Commission'), also known as FIA Karting and the CIK-FIA, is the primary governing body for international kart racing. Founded in 1962, it is one of six World Championship commissions of the FIA.

Based in Geneva, the CIK-FIA holds responsibility for international kart racing rules and safety, as well as organising the Karting World Championship, amongst other competitions.

== History ==
=== Organisation ===
The CIK was founded by the FIA in 1962 as a sister commission to their Commission Sportive Internationale (CSI). In 1978, the FIA created a new governing body for automobile sport called the Fédération Internationale du Sport Automobile (FISA) which consumed the CSI, however the CIK remained with the FIA and became known as CIK-FIA in short. In the late 1980s and early 1990s, FISA was abolished, returning automobile sport control to the FIA and their new World Motor Sport Council, which also held authority over the CIK.

In 1998, the CIK gained some independence and it was renamed to Fédération Mondial de Karting (FMK, also known as FMK-FIA), distinct from both the FIA and the separate organisations International Kart Federation and World Karting Association. However the Federation was short lived and in 2000, reverted to being known as the CIK, or CIK-FIA, ultimately becoming one of seven World Championship commissions within the FIA.

=== Early years (1962–1980) ===
Throughout the 20th century, kart racing became the proving ground for many drivers on the pathway to professional auto racing; in particular, formula racing.

=== "Golden Era" (1981–2006) ===
The homologation of chassis and engines in 1981 ushered in the "Golden Era" of international karting. In 1985, Alain Prost—the 1973 junior direct-drive Karting World Cup winner—became the first CIK champion to progress to win the Formula One World Drivers' Championship.

=== Modern developments (2007–present) ===
The CIK-FIA attempted to re-brand global karting in 2007. The primary direct-drive class became KF1 and the primary gearbox class became KZ1. The secondary divisions KF2 and KZ2 each replaced ICA and ICC; both classes had been contested since the early 1980s. KF3 replaced ICA-J as the junior direct-drive class.

In 2013, Max Verstappen became the first driver to win three CIK championships in a single season, winning both the KF and KZ European Championships, as well as the KZ World Championship. Verstappen also became the first driver to win CIK championships in both the primary direct-drive and gearbox classes in a single season, and the first driver to win multiple European Championships in a single season since his father Jos in 1989.

In 2016, Original Kart (OK) regulations replaced KF in the direct-drive category, after its perceived failure within the kart racing community and restrictive regulations resulted in reduced entries at international competitions. OK-Junior (OK-J) also replaced KF-J as the junior class.

== Organisation ==
=== Presidents ===
The commission's first official president was Jean-Marie Balestre, who would later become president of the FIA. He held the karting presidency for two years, being replaced by Belgian Pierre Ugeux in 1964. Ugeux's tenure lasted until 1971, when he was replaced by Charles Defrancesco of Switzerland.

Ernest Buser was the CIK president from 1978 until 1999, overseeing the CIK's expansion to five continents. World Championships were hosted in abundance outside of Europe, including in: South Africa in 1984 for FE, the United States in 1986 for FK, Argentina in 1994 for FA and FK, and the United States again in 1998 for FC, amongst several World Cups elsewhere. Buser also oversaw the systematic televised coverage of international kart racing via Eurosport.

Yvon Léon was appointed president in 2000 and stayed in office until 2004. During his term karting's rules, regulations and championships all changed and he received heavy criticism from manufacturers, drivers and fans. Upon Léon's resignation, Vincent Caro was appointed interim president.

Luigi Macaluso held the office from October 2005 to October 2009, prior to the reign of Nicolas Deschaux until October 2010. Macaluso oversaw the re-branding of global karting to KF and KZ regulations. Shaikh Abdulla bin Isa Al Khalifa, from the ruling family of Bahrain, would then hold the office until December 2017.

Felipe Massa took office in December 2017, becoming the first Formula One driver to hold the office. Indian former racing driver Akbar Ebrahim succeeded Massa in February 2022, with Massa becoming the FIA Drivers’ Commission President.

CIK-FIA Presidents
Commission Internationale de Karting (CIK)
Term	President	Nationality
1962–1964	Jean-Marie Balestre	France
1964–1971	Pierre Ugeux	Belgium
1971–1978	Charles Defrancesco	Switzerland
1978–1999	Ernest Buser	Switzerland
2000–2004	Yvon Léon	France
2004–2005	Vincent Caro (interim)	Belgium
2005–2009	Luigi Macaluso	Italy
2009–2010	Nicolas Deschaux	France
2011–2017	Abdulla bin Isa Al Khalifa	Bahrain
2017–2022	Felipe Massa	Brazil
2022–present	Akbar Ebrahim	India

== Categories ==
The CIK-FIA currently sanction kart racing in eight categories: five direct-drive and three gearbox.

=== Direct-drive categories ===
==== Current direct-drive categories (2016–present) ====
There are currently five direct-drive categories contested in CIK-FIA competition. OK is the primary direct-drive category.

- Original Kart (OK) – the primary direct-drive class
- OK-Junior (OK-J) – the junior direct-drive class
- OK-N
- OKN-Junior (OKN-J)
- Mini

==== Former direct-drive categories (1962–2015) ====
- KF1 (Formula A/Formula K)

=== Gearbox categories ===
==== Current gearbox categories (2007–present) ====
There are currently three gearbox categories contested in CIK-FIA competition. KZ is the primary gearbox category, with KZ2 as the secondary.

- KZ – the primary gearbox class
- KZ2 – the secondary gearbox class
- KZ2-Masters – the senior gearbox class

==== Former gearbox categories (1974–2006) ====
- Super-ICC

== Competitions ==
The major karting competitions sanctioned by the CIK-FIA includes the World Championship and the European Championship. They have also sanctioned several other continental titles. The CIK-FIA have also hosted the Academy Trophy for junior drivers since 2010.

== Licences ==
The International Karting Licence is a licence issued by the CIK-FIA which allows drivers to compete internationally. There are three grades, as of 2026:

- Grade E (aged 15 or over): OK, KZ*, KZ2*, KZ2-M*, OK-N, Academy-Senior
- Grade F (aged 14 to 15): OK*, OK-N*, Academy-Senior*
- Grade G (aged 12 to 14): OK-J*, OKN-J*, Academy-Junior*

* Lowest grade required to compete in class.

== International Karting Ranking ==
The International Karting Ranking (IKR) is a points system operated by the CIK-FIA that ranks all kart racers registered to national governing bodies recognised by the FIA. Established in 2023, the IKR assigns points to drivers based on their eight best results in national and international competition, weighted by class, age group, level of competition, and homologation. The year-end overall points leader is formally named the IKR Driver of the Year at the FIA Prize Giving Ceremony.

=== Year-end leaders ===
Year	IKR Driver of the Year		Year-end No. 1 by class						
Year	Driver	Class(es)	OK	OK-J	KZ	KZ2	KZ2-M	OK-N	OKN-J
2023	(United Kingdom) Lewis Wherrell	OK-J	(Netherlands) René Lammers*	(United Kingdom) Lewis Wherrell	(Sweden) Viktor Gustavsson	(Germany) Niels Tröger†	(Italy) Davide Forè†	—N/a	—N/a
2024	(Belgium) Dries Van Langendonck	OK, OK-J*	(United Kingdom) Joe Turney*	(Belgium) Dries Van Langendonck*	(Netherlands) Senna van Walstijn	(Italy) Cristian Bertuca†	(Italy) Davide Forè	(Spain) Luna Fluxá	(Australia) James Anagnostiadis
2025	(United Kingdom) Noah Baglin	OK-J†	(Spain) Christian Costoya*	(United Kingdom) Noah Baglin†	(Spain) Pedro Hiltbrand	Maksim Orlov (Note: Following the Russian invasion of Ukraine in 2022, the FIA banned competitors from racing under the Russian and Belarusian flags; they may compete neutrally or under a different licence.)	(Italy) Angelo Lombardo†	(Lithuania) Markas Šilkūnas	(United Arab Emirates) Conor Clancy

* Driver won the European Championship.
^{†} Driver won the World Championship, World Cup, or International Super Cup.
^{‡} Driver won both the World and European titles.

== Hall of Fame ==
The FIA Karting Hall of Fame has 15 inductees, as of 2025:

- (Italy) Giovanni Parrilla (b. 1911)
- (Switzerland) Ernest Buser (b. 1932)
- (Belgium) François Goldstein (b. 1945)
- (France) Alain Prost (b. 1955)
- (United States) World's first go-kart (b. 1956)
- (United Kingdom) Mike Wilson (b. 1959)
- (Brazil) Ayrton Senna (b. 1960)
- (Italy) Tecno Piuma (b. 1963)
- (Italy) Sala dynasty (b. 1964)
- (Germany) Michael Schumacher (b. 1969)
- (United Kingdom) Jenson Button (b. 1980)
- (Spain) Fernando Alonso (b. 1981)
- (United Kingdom) Lewis Hamilton (b. 1985)
- (Germany) Nico Rosberg (b. 1985)
- (Germany) Sebastian Vettel (b. 1987)
