= Elf Masters =

Indoor all-star kart racing competition in Paris, France

(France) Masters of Paris-Bercy
- Category: Kart racing
- Country: France
- Affiliations: FFSA
- Inaugural season: 1993
- Folded: 2011
- Classes: 2 (Star, Junior)
- Last Drivers' champion: (France) Jules Bianchi (Saturday Final) (France) Jean-Éric Vergne (Sunday Final) (Monaco) Charles Leclerc (Junior)

The Masters of Paris-Bercy, officially known as the Elf Masters for sponsorship reasons, was an indoor all-star kart racing competition organised by the FFSA.

Founded in 1993 by former Formula One driver Philippe Streiff, it was hosted until 2001 on a temporary circuit at the Palais Omnisport de Paris-Bercy. Streiff founded the Masters with the intention of bringing together the best drivers from all disciplines of professional auto racing and karting.

In 2011, ERDF revived the competition as a one-off event with electric karts, known as the ERDF Masters Kart.

== History ==
=== Elf Masters (1993–2001) ===
The first edition of the Elf Masters took place on 18 and 19 December 1993. Two races were held each evening, a relay race contested by teams of three drivers (a Formula 1 driver, a driver from another discipline of motorsport, and a young kart driver) and a race counting towards the CIK Championship. This weekend marked the last duel on the track between Alain Prost and Ayrton Senna.

In 1994 the team relay was replaced by a simple race between the big names in motorsport. It was a battle between Alain Prost and Michael Schumacher that held the Bercy arena in suspense. French driver Jean-Christophe Boullion won the first race on Saturday and Alessandro Zanardi won on Sunday.

In 1995, Prost and Schumacher did not participate and it was a young French driver, David Terrien who won the first race ahead of Gianni Morbidelli. On Sunday Luca Badoer won the race ahead of David Terrien.

In 1996, the relay race returned and Michael Schumacher came back to Bercy and started all the weekend's races. He won the CIK race on Sunday.

In 1997, Jacques Villeneuve started at Bercy. On Saturday Alessandro Zanardi won the F1 race. Mika Salo won on Sunday.

In 1998, Mario Andretti, Jody Scheckter and Mick Doohan came to Bercy. Also competing were names such as Dario Franchitti, Tony Kanaan and Fernando Alonso who would later find success in higher racing categories. Emmanuel Collard won on Saturday and Jean-Christophe Boullion won on Sunday. That year Fernando Alonso won the first CIK race and Giorgio Pantano won the second.

In 1999, no high-profile motorsport and F1 stars were present. Stéphane Sarrazin won the first superfinale and Franck Montagny the second. This year Robert Kubica won the second CIK race.

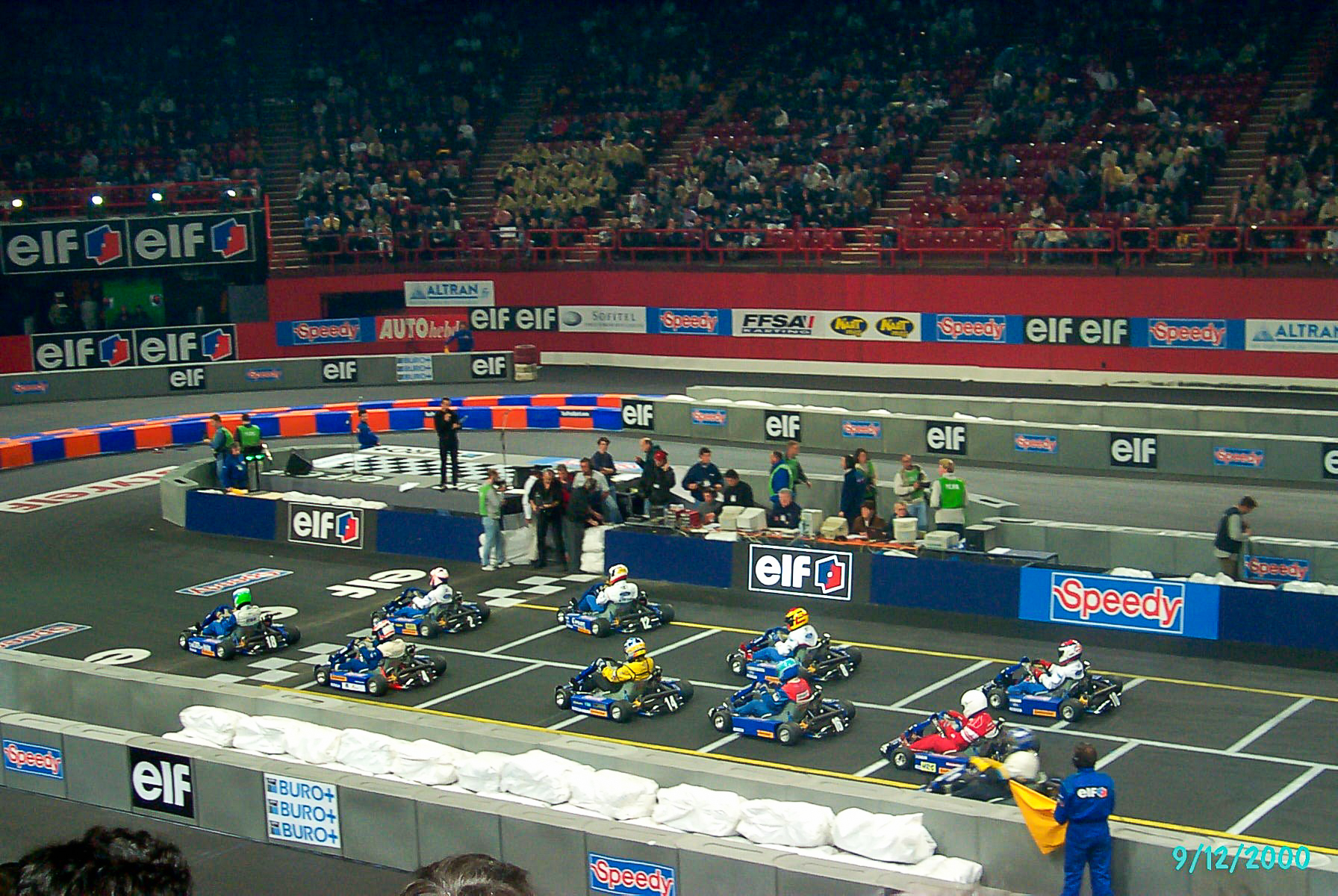
The starting grid for the 2000 Elf Masters

In 2000, the three-driver relay race was reintroduced and it was the French team of Sébastien Bourdais, Jean-Christophe Boullion and Julien Poncelet that won on Saturday. The European team of Franck Lagorce, Clivio Piccione and Félix Porteiro won on Sunday. Lewis Hamilton won one of the support races.

In 2001, the relay team of Vitantonio Liuzzi, Davide Forè and Franck Lagorce won the superfinal. Sebastian Vettel won the junior race ahead of Nico Hülkenberg. It was the last edition of the Elf Masters.

=== ERDF Masters Kart (2011) ===
In 2011, ERDF revived the competition as a one-off event with electric karts, won by Jules Bianchi on the Saturday and Jean-Éric Vergne on the Sunday. Charles Leclerc triumphed in the junior class on both days.

== Karts ==
The ERDF Masters Kart in 2011 used electric karts supplied by French company Sodikart, capable of producing 30 kW with top speeds in excess of 100 kph.

=== Kart specification (2011) ===
Chassis	Sodi ST32
Motor	Sodi STX 65V BLDC
Battery	NMC
Autonomy	15 minutes
Recharge	30 minutes
Brakes	Hydraulic with manual front brakes
Tyres	Dunlop
Power (Note: The Bercy versions of the karts were limited to 20 kW (27 hp) from their original power of 30 kW (40 hp).)	22 kW (30 hp) at 14,000 rpm
Weight	114 kg (251 lb)

== Circuit ==
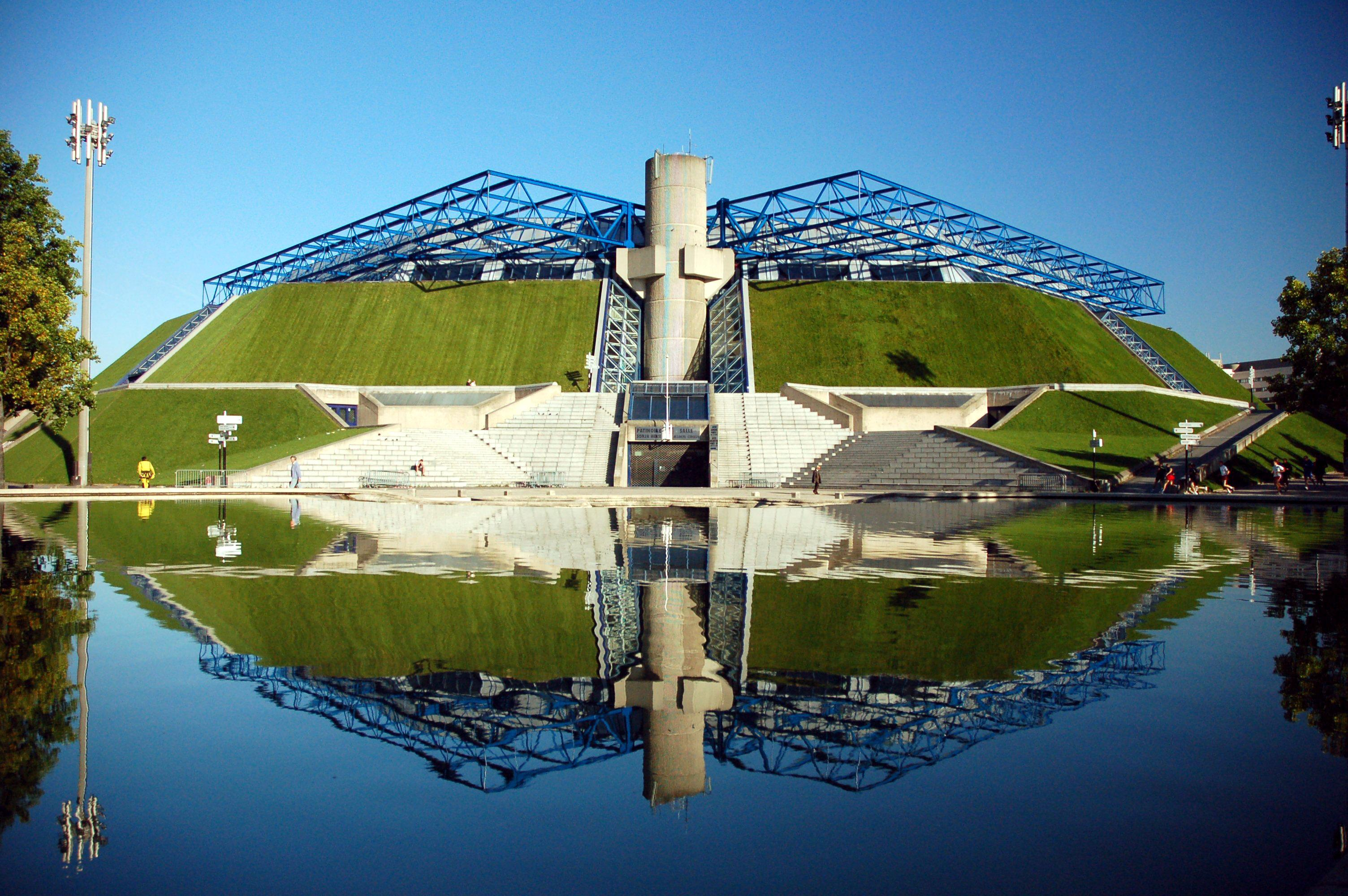
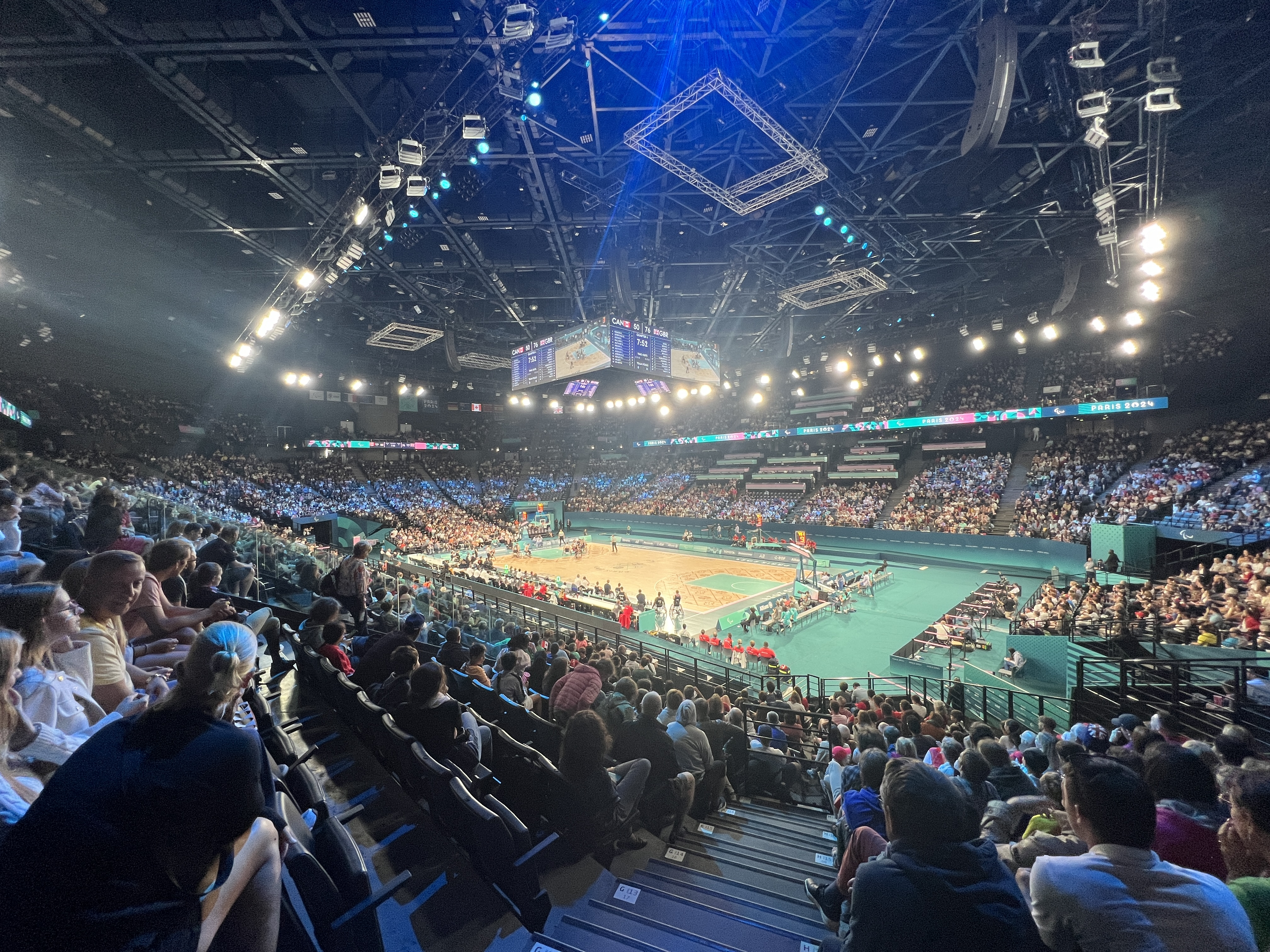
Palais Omnisport de Paris-Bercy, the venue of the Elf Masters.

The Masters of Paris-Bercy was contested at the Palais Omnisport de Paris-Bercy, a sports arena in the neighbourhood of Bercy, in the 12th arrondissement of Paris. The track was 0.550 km (0.342 mi) long, with an average width of 8 m. Approximately half of this length was outside of the main arena, but still under cover. The track was lined with Tecpro barriers for driver protection.

== See also ==
- Palais Omnisport de Paris-Bercy
- Karting World Championship
- Karting European Championship
- Fédération Française du Sport Automobile
- Elf Aquitaine
- Électricité de France
- Kart racing
- List of kart racing championships
- All-star game
