= Homologation (motorsport) =

Type approval process for a vehicle, race track, or standardised part

In motorsport, homologation is a testing and certification process for vehicles, circuits, and related equipment for conformance to technical standards, usually known as type approval in English-language jurisdictions. It confirms conformity to standards or categorisation criteria typically set by the sporting authority. At international and supra-national level, the FIA and FIM mandate what must be homologated, the FIA in its International Sporting Code and appendices. National sporting authorities such as Motorsport UK must adhere to these rules but may enforce additional or specific homologation rules applicable to their series or jurisdiction, however, unaffiliated series may set their own requirements.

The word homologation is derived from Greek ὁμολογέω, homologeo, 'I agree'.

== Requirements ==
"Production-based" racing series require that racing vehicles are based on production vehicles for sale to the public. Homologation not only requires compliance with a racing series' technical guidelines (for example engine displacement, chassis construction, suspension design and such), but often includes minimum levels of sales of that model to the public, to ensure that no vehicles in the competition have been designed and produced solely for racing. Since such vehicles are primarily intended for the race track, practical use on public roads is generally a secondary design consideration, so long as government regulations are met.

Sales aids (for example the inclusion of luxury trim features such as leather surfaces, audio systems, and anti-theft systems), even where such accommodations are made, are generally barely within the limits of government requirements for sale to consumers, to minimize reduction in performance. Such accommodations are often reversible, so that production vehicles can be modified to racing trim. A common example of this process is the exhaust system, often modified in the production vehicle to meet legal requirements in the jurisdictions where the vehicle is sold. Since most production-based racing series allow some level of modification, including the removal of exhaust systems that reduce emissions at the cost of engine performance, vehicles that were produced and sold primarily to meet the homologation guidelines of a particular series are often designed for easy modification of such components.

=== Automobiles ===
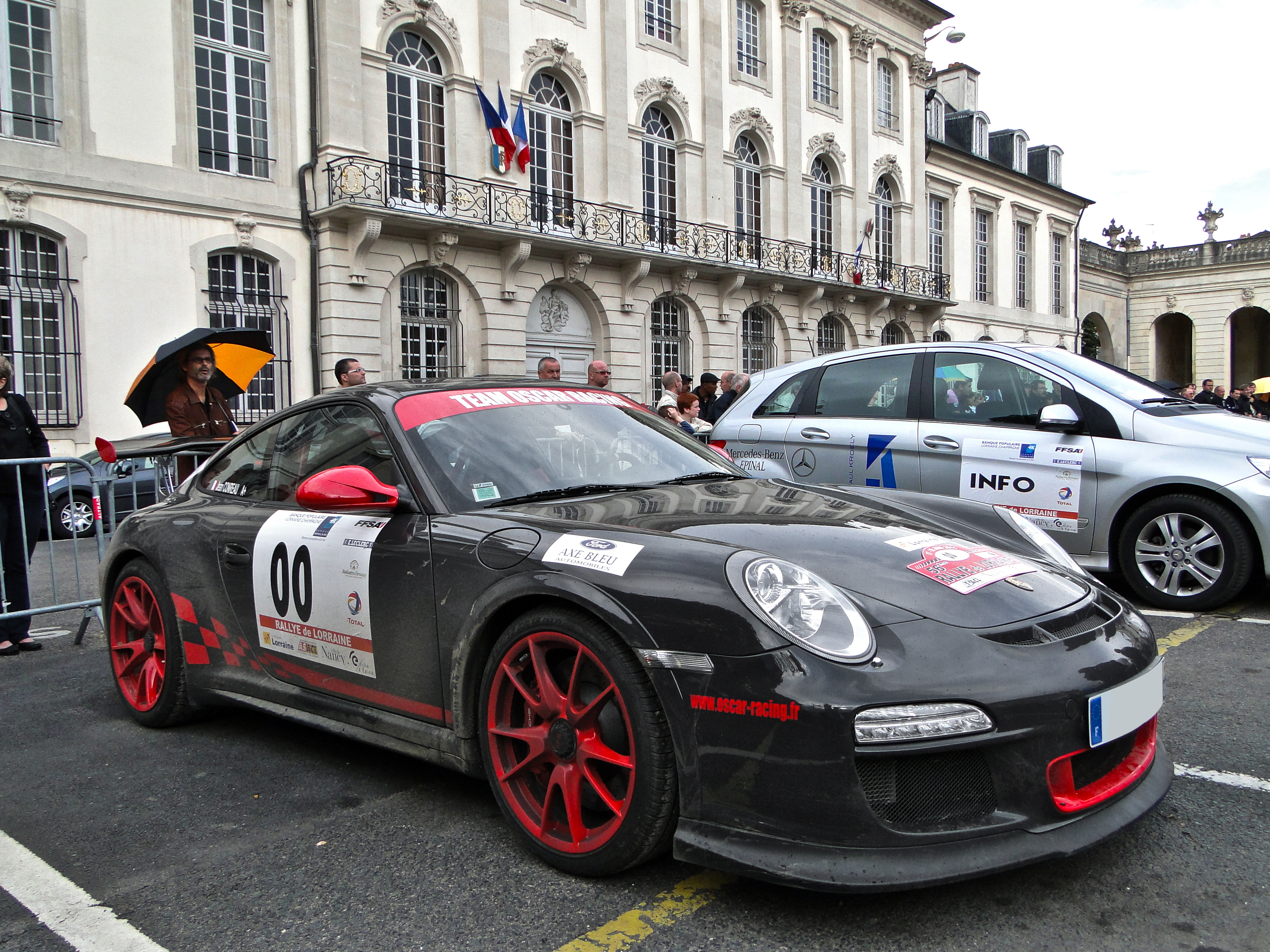
Porsche 911 GT3 RS.

Many manufacturers of vehicles used in production-based racing (whether the vehicles were produced solely to meet homologation guidelines or as a genuine for-profit line) offer a line of high-performance parts not intended for use on public roads. Such components could include exhaust systems and engine internals, and are generally within the homologation guidelines of the racing series in which the vehicles are to be used.

There is also a brisk after-market supplying components for converting production vehicles to race trim for production-based racing series. One example is lightweight, quickly removable bodywork, to replace stock bodywork that is often heavier and has features required on public roads, such as lighting systems.

Some sports cars are released to the public for the express purpose of meeting the homologation guidelines of a particular series or several series. In such cases, numbers manufactured are often just enough to meet the minimum requirement for homologation by the racing series for which the vehicle was designed. In such cases, the manufacturer often designates the car's status in the name, for instance the 1962–1964 Ferrari 250 GTO, "GTO" being the acronym for (in Italian) Gran Turismo Omologata, that is, a homologated grand touring sports car.

This term is also used to describe various auto racing sanctioning bodies using the same set of rules for a certain class of cars. Homologation is most popular with the production based Fédération Internationale de l'Automobile (FIA) Group GT3 class, where no fewer than 20 different race sanctioning bodies around the world use the same set of rules for this class. This allows the same car to be raced under different sanctioning bodies with no modification between races.

When a car loses its homologation, it can no longer be part of a competition and can only be used in historic competitions.

=== Motorcycles ===
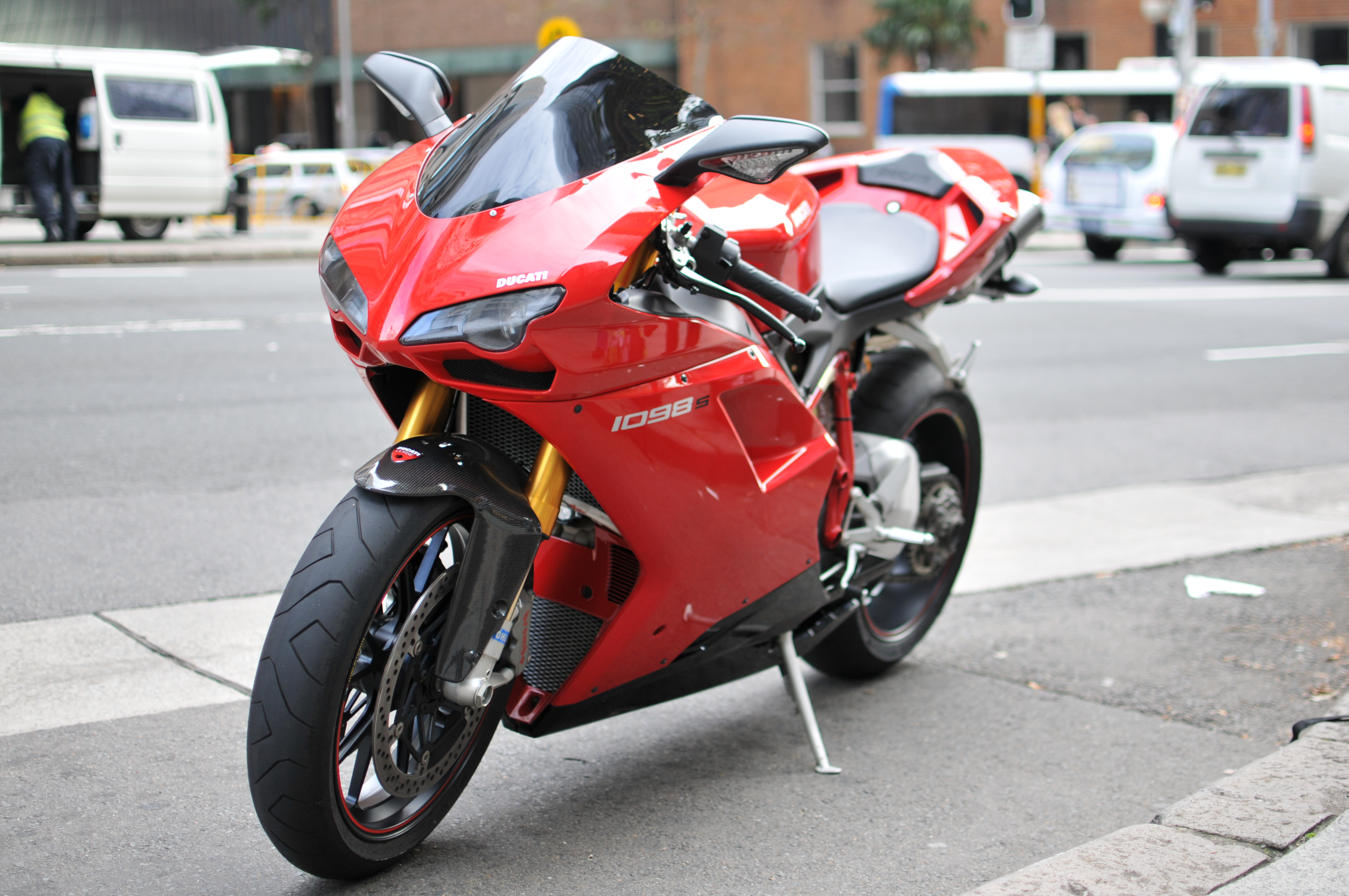
Ducati 1098 S

The same is true of most motorcycle racing series that can be considered production-based and include the various classes of such premier series as the AMA Superbike Championship or the FIM's Superbike World Championship. As with automobiles, motorcycle manufacturers manufacture certain models for the consumer market to enable the model to qualify for entry in a particular production-based racing series.

One example of a production motorcycle that was designed and built primarily to meet homologation requirements is the 2008 Ducati 1098R, a limited-edition version of Ducati's 1098 S sportbike. Ducati even refers to the 1098R in the press as the Homologation Special.
Wherever any compromise was made on the 1098S for the purpose of making it a more street-friendly and consumer-ready vehicle (for example, reliability, rideability, economy), the 1098R's design makes a far more limited compromise or no compromise at all. An example is the displacement—unlike the engine of the 1098S that has 1098 cc displacement, the 1098R's engine has a displacement of 1198 cc, allowing it to take advantage of the WSBK rulebook that allows up to 1200 cc for engines of the type found in the 1098 series.
