= World Karting Association =

Largest sanctioning body for kart racing in North America

The World Karting Association, or WKA, is the largest sanctioning body for kart racing in North America. The WKA was founded in 1971 and is located directly behind Charlotte Motor Speedway in Concord, North Carolina. The WKA is believed to currently have approximately 5,000 members. Over 50,000 people have been WKA members since the organization's inception in 1971.

The WKA comprises five national touring series - the Bully Clutches Gold Cup for oval karts, Bridgestone/George Kugler Manufacturer's Cup driven by Mazda for sprint road course karts on asphalt, Vega Road Racing Series presented by Summit Racing Equipment, Briggs & Stratton Speedway Dirt and Rage Karts Speedway Pavement. The WKA sanctions a number of divisional series and tracks, mostly located throughout the eastern half of the United States.

== Gold Cup Series ==
The Gold Cup Series is a four-race tour with races at Charlotte Motor Speedway in North Carolina, G&J Kartway in Camden, Ohio, New Castle Motorsports Park in Indiana and Pitt Race (Formerly BeaveRun) in Wampum, Pennsylvania. The series competes exclusively on sprint-style road courses and all classes are powered by Briggs & Stratton 4-cycle engines.

== Manufacturer's Cup Series ==
The Manufacturer's Cup Series may be WKA's most popular and promotable series. Top American race drivers such as Jamie McMurray and A. J. Allmendinger occasionally compete in the series, which travels to locations such as Daytona International Speedway, Michiana Raceway Park in Indiana, Road America in Elkhart Lake, Wisconsin, New Castle Motorsports Park in New Castle, Ind., Pitt Race (Formerly BeaverRun) in Wampum, Pennsylvania, GoPro Motorplex in Mooresville, North Carolina, and Charlotte Motor Speedway. Like the Gold Cup, the tracks are sprint-style road courses that are generally around 1 mile (1.6 km) in length. Contrary to Gold Cup, most classes are powered by faster, more powerful Two-stroke engine|2-cycle engines (with the LO2O6 Four-stroke engine being the oddball). Yamaha, Micro Swift (called Mini Swift by officials) and Mini Swift (called Pro Swift Sportsman by officials) Cadet karts compete in the Man (Manufactures) Cup Series. Junior classes include another Yamaha class and the Junior and Senior IAME X30 classes. Racers from all over America, Barbados, Canada and even Brazil race in the Man Cup series.

== Winter Cup Series ==
The WKA Winter Cup is similar to the Manufactures Cup, but with races in the southeast area, usually Florida. In the 2016-2017 Season the tracks ran were Daytona Motor Speedway (in the infield of the NASCAR track), Jacksonville, Florida (103rd Street Sports Complex) and Ocala Gran Prix. The race in Daytona counts for both Winter Cup and Manufactures Cup for the following year.

== Road Racing Series ==
The Road Racing Series (formerly Enduro Series) is different from the other four WKA national touring series. Laydown-enduro and sprint-enduro karts are built specifically for enduro-style road racing. Enduro-style road races are not held on sprint-style courses, but longer road courses typically built for race cars that are between 1.5 and 4.5 miles (7.2 km) in length. Gearbox (shifter) karts and Touch-and-Go (TaG) sit-up style karts also compete at Road Racing events. It is not uncommon for 40 to 50 different classes to compete throughout the course of a Road Racing weekend.

Unlike the other WKA series, road racing events are raced for a specific amount of time as opposed to number of laps. Sprint and sprint-enduro classes have 30-minute races and laydown-enduro style classes have 45-minute races. Through the mid-1980s, laydown-enduro races were 1 hour in length, hence the name "enduro," short for endurance. Most drivers have a timer mounted on their kart so they know what stage the race is at and when the final lap will be.

Again, unlike the other WKA series, road races begin from a Le Mans start. Most other WKA national series (except shifter karts) begin races with a rolling start. At road racing events, karts line up in a traditional "Le Mans" style starting formation. The race official/starter starts a timer when he or she puts the green flag up and holds the flag in the air until he waves it and the karts take off. Road racing starts - similar to endurance motorcycle racing and pre-1969 sports car events - are very exciting to witness and participate in.

The speeds go-karts reach at Road Racing events is perhaps the most intriguing part of the WKA Road Racing Series. 250cc karts, which look like small Indy cars, and dual-engine enduro karts reach in excess of 130 mph (210 km/h). Most other 2-cycle classes can reach anywhere from 90 to 130 mph (130 to 210 km/h). Even four-cycle powered karts reach top speeds around 80 to 90 mph (130 to 145 km/h) at Road Racing events.

WKA road racers have the opportunity to race on some of America's most historic and reputable road courses. In the 2014 racing season, the WKA National Road Racing Series visits Mid-Ohio Sports Car Course, Virginia International Raceway, Putnam Park, Carolina Motorsports Park, Daytona International Speedway, Grattan Raceway, NCCAR, Summit Point Raceway, and New Jersey Motorsports Park. In the past the series has held events at almost every permanent roadracing facility in the U.S., including: Watkins Glen, Roebling Road Raceway, Pocono Raceway, Bryar Motosports Park, New Hampshire Motor Speedway, Gateway International Raceway, Indianapolis Raceway Park, Oak Hill Raceway, Hallet Oklahoma, Texas World Speedway, Road America, Blackhawk Farms, Rockingham speedway, Charlotte Motor Speedway (Lowe's), Nazareth Speedway, Barber Motorsports Park, and Road Atlanta.

WKA road racers reside mostly in the midwest, southeastern, and eastern half of the country. WKA road racing is more popular where healthy divisional road racing clubs are located. Several of these strong regional clubs include the Southern Kart Club, Woodbridge Kart Club, and Dart Kart Club. The activity of roadracing karts peaked in the mid-1980s with some events reaching over 1000 entries at a national event. The participants in modern roadrace events are perhaps the most passionate about the sport. Many of these lifelong participants have been active in the sport for over 30 years.

== Speedway Dirt and Speedway Pavement Series ==
The Speedway Dirt Series is one of two WKA national series that holds races exclusively on oval tracks. It is the only series that races on dirt tracks. The track sizes range between (approximately) one-eighth-mile to one-quarter-mile.

The Speedway Dirt Series has been WKA's best attended series throughout the 2000s; although, recently entry numbers have dropped off due to a difficult economy and the WKA treating the dirt oval racers poorly. The series is a five-race tour in 2009. All races are held in the South - specifically Georgia and the Carolinas in 2009. The tour has traveled to Tennessee and Florida in past years. Most speedway dirt competitors reside in the South.

The Speedway Pavement Series is the other WKA national series that competes on oval tracks. The series is a five-race tour in 2009, visiting New Castle, Ind., Chapel Hill Raceway in Humphrey, New York, Riverhead Raceway on Long Island, OCR Action Sports Track in Rougemont, North Carolina, and BeaverRun (now Pittrace) in Wampum, Pa. Contrary to the Dirt Series, Speedway Pavement races are held on asphalt tracks.

While Speedway Dirt teams are located mostly in the South, many Speedway Pavement teams are located in the Northeast. The Southeast also is well represented with Pavement teams.

Speedway Dirt and Pavement racers drive karts built specifically for oval-track kart racing. Unlike sprint-style and enduro-style karts in which the driver sits in the center of the chassis, oval-track karts feature an extreme left driver offset for a high percentage of left-side weight which greatly helps handling on an oval track. Engines are on the right of the kart - reasoning being that the driver weighs more than the engine. This is contrary to race cars, which the engine would greatly outweigh the driver and the oval-kart driver offset theory would not work.

All classes in Speedway Dirt and Pavement are powered by Briggs & Stratton 4-cycle engines. This has not always been true, however. 2-cycle engines (Yamahas and others) were once fairly popular on the Dirt tour. In recent years though the Briggs & Stratton motor popularity has declined, as most karters use the Cheaper more reliable Honda clone motors.

== See also ==
- International Kart Federation, another U.S. karting association
- Commission Internationale de Karting (CIK-FIA), the international sanctioning body for kart racing
