= 2013 AdvoCare 500 (Atlanta) =

Race details
- Race 25 of 36 in the 2013 NASCAR Sprint Cup Series
- Atlanta Motor Speedway track layout
- Date: September 1, 2013
- Location: Atlanta Motor Speedway; Hampton, Georgia, United States
- Course: Permanent racing facility
- Course length: 1.54 miles (2.48 km)
- Distance: 325 laps, 500.5 mi (805.476 km)
- Weather: Temperatures up to 90 °F (32 °C); wind speeds up to 14 miles per hour (23 km/h)
- Average speed: 135.128 mph (217.467 km/h)

Pole position
| Driver | Ricky Stenhouse Jr. | Roush Fenway Racing |
- Time: 29.227 seconds

Most laps led
| Driver | Joey Logano | Penske Racing |
- Laps: 77

Winner
| No. 18 | Kyle Busch | Joe Gibbs Racing |

Television in the United States
- Network: ESPN
- Announcers: Allen Bestwick, Dale Jarrett, and Andy Petree
- Nielsen ratings: 3.2 (5.323 million viewers)

The 2013 AdvoCare 500 was a NASCAR Sprint Cup Series stock car race that was held on September 1, 2013, at Atlanta Motor Speedway in Hampton, Georgia, United States. Contested over 325 laps on the 1.54-mile (2.48 km) quad-oval, it was the twenty-fifth race of the 2013 NASCAR Sprint Cup Series season. Kyle Busch of Joe Gibbs Racing won the race, his fourth win of the season, while Joey Logano finished second. Martin Truex Jr., Kurt Busch, and Ryan Newman rounded out the top five.

== Report ==
=== Background ===
Atlanta Motor Speedway is a four-turn quad-oval track that is 1.54 miles (2.48 km) long. The track's turns are banked at twenty-four degrees, while the 2,332-foot (711 m) front stretch, the location of the finish line, and the 1,800-foot (550 m) back stretch are banked at five. The track's racing surface width varies from 55 feet to 60 feet. Denny Hamlin was the race's defending winner after winning the event in 2012.

Before the race, Jimmie Johnson was leading the Drivers' Championship with 821 points, while Clint Bowyer stood in second with 803 points. Carl Edwards followed in the third with 768, eight points ahead of Kevin Harvick and twenty-nine ahead of Kyle Busch in fourth and fifth. Matt Kenseth, with 730, was in sixth; twenty-two ahead of Dale Earnhardt Jr., who was scored seventh. Eighth-placed Kasey Kahne was three points ahead of Greg Biffle and sixteen ahead of Joey Logano in ninth and tenth. In the Manufacturers' Championship, Chevrolet was leading with 168 points, eleven points ahead of Toyota. Ford was third with 124 points.

=== Entry list ===
(R) - Denotes rookie driver.

(i) - Denotes driver who is ineligible for series driver points.

| No. | Driver | Team | Manufacturer |
|---|---|---|---|
| 1 | Jamie McMurray | Earnhardt Ganassi Racing | Chevrolet |
| 2 | Brad Keselowski | Penske Racing | Ford |
| 5 | Kasey Kahne | Hendrick Motorsports | Chevrolet |
| 7 | Dave Blaney | Tommy Baldwin Racing | Chevrolet |
| 9 | Marcos Ambrose | Richard Petty Motorsports | Ford |
| 10 | Danica Patrick (R) | Stewart–Haas Racing | Chevrolet |
| 11 | Denny Hamlin | Joe Gibbs Racing | Toyota |
| 13 | Casey Mears | Germain Racing | Ford |
| 14 | Mark Martin | Stewart–Haas Racing | Chevrolet |
| 15 | Clint Bowyer | Michael Waltrip Racing | Toyota |
| 16 | Greg Biffle | Roush Fenway Racing | Ford |
| 17 | Ricky Stenhouse Jr. (R) | Roush Fenway Racing | Ford |
| 18 | Kyle Busch | Joe Gibbs Racing | Toyota |
| 20 | Matt Kenseth | Joe Gibbs Racing | Toyota |
| 22 | Joey Logano | Penske Racing | Ford |
| 24 | Jeff Gordon | Hendrick Motorsports | Chevrolet |
| 27 | Paul Menard | Richard Childress Racing | Chevrolet |
| 29 | Kevin Harvick | Richard Childress Racing | Chevrolet |
| 30 | David Stremme | Swan Racing | Toyota |
| 31 | Jeff Burton | Richard Childress Racing | Chevrolet |
| 32 | Timmy Hill (R) | FAS Lane Racing | Ford |
| 33 | Austin Dillon (i) | Richard Childress Racing | Chevrolet |
| 34 | David Ragan | Front Row Motorsports | Ford |
| 35 | Josh Wise (i) | Front Row Motorsports | Ford |
| 36 | J. J. Yeley | Tommy Baldwin Racing | Chevrolet |
| 38 | David Gilliland | Front Row Motorsports | Ford |
| 39 | Ryan Newman | Stewart–Haas Racing | Chevrolet |
| 40 | Landon Cassill (i) | Circle Sport | Chevrolet |
| 42 | Juan Pablo Montoya | Earnhardt Ganassi Racing | Chevrolet |
| 43 | Aric Almirola | Richard Petty Motorsports | Ford |
| 47 | A. J. Allmendinger | JTG Daugherty Racing | Toyota |
| 48 | Jimmie Johnson | Hendrick Motorsports | Chevrolet |
| 51 | Mike Bliss (i) | Phoenix Racing | Chevrolet |
| 55 | Brian Vickers (i) | Michael Waltrip Racing | Toyota |
| 56 | Martin Truex Jr. | Michael Waltrip Racing | Toyota |
| 78 | Kurt Busch | Furniture Row Racing | Chevrolet |
| 83 | David Reutimann | BK Racing | Toyota |
| 87 | Joe Nemechek (i) | NEMCO-Jay Robinson Racing | Toyota |
| 88 | Dale Earnhardt Jr. | Hendrick Motorsports | Chevrolet |
| 93 | Travis Kvapil | BK Racing | Toyota |
| 95 | Scott Speed | Leavine Family Racing | Ford |
| 98 | Michael McDowell | Phil Parsons Racing | Ford |
| 99 | Carl Edwards | Roush Fenway Racing | Ford |
Official entry list

=== Practice and qualifying ===
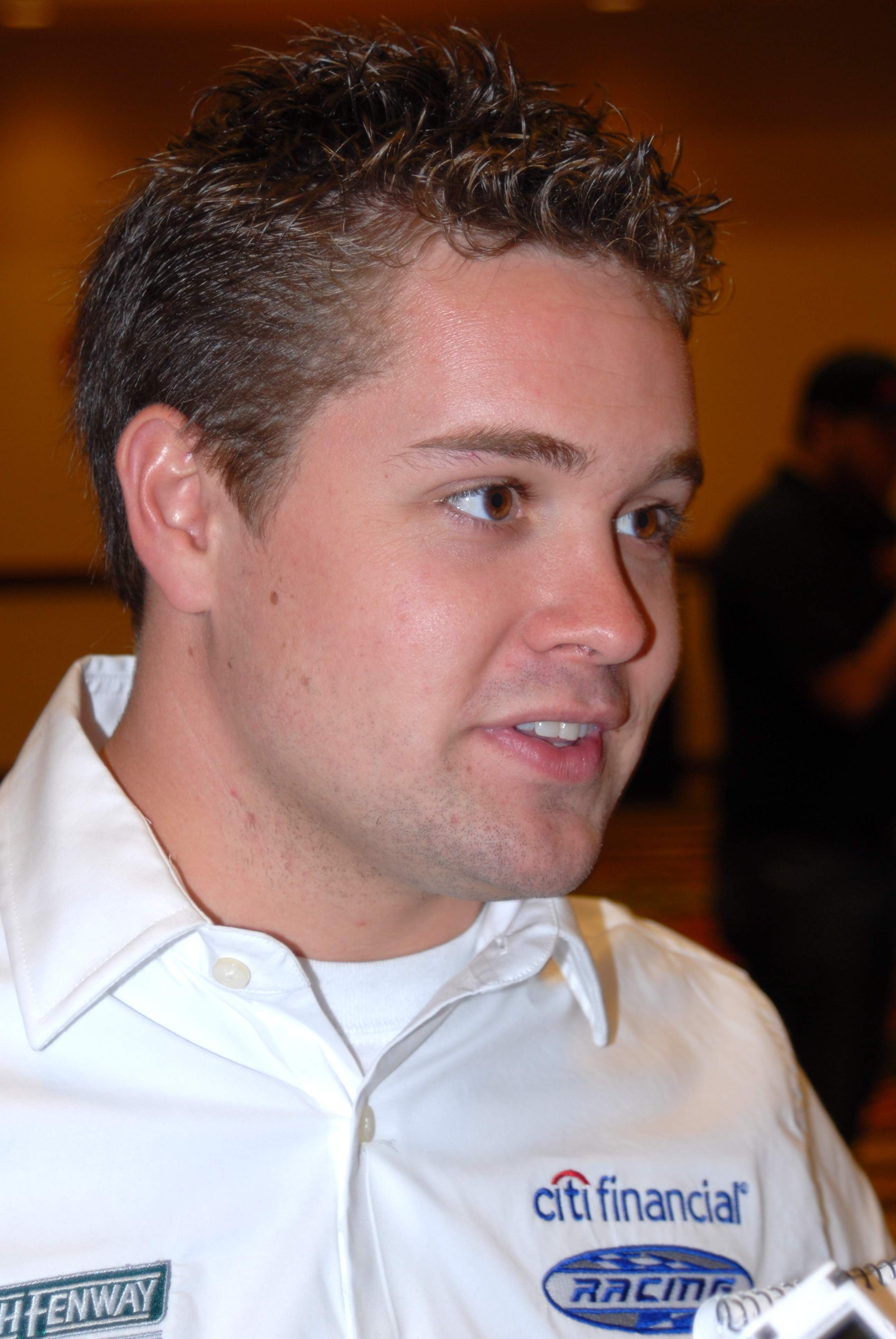
Ricky Stenhouse Jr. started first on the grid after winning the pole position.

Three practice sessions were held before the race. The first session, scheduled on August 30, 2013, was 90 minutes long. The second and third, held a day later on August 31, 2013, were 55 and 50 minutes long. In the first practice session, Brad Keselowski was the quickest with a best lap time of 29.168 seconds. Edwards followed in second, ahead of Juan Pablo Montoya and Kurt Busch in third and fourth. Bowyer was scored fifth-quickest with a best lap time of 29.491, more than three-tenths slower than Keselowski. Logano, Martin Truex Jr., Mark Martin, Biffle, and Kenseth completed the top-ten.

During the qualifying session, Rookie of the Year contender, Ricky Stenhouse Jr. recorded his first Sprint Cup Series career pole position with a lap time of 29.227 seconds and a speed of 189.688 mph (305.273 km/h). Edwards, who completed his lap in 29.330 seconds, will start alongside Stenhouse on the grid, in front of Montoya, Hamlin, and Jeff Gordon. Kenseth, with a lap time of 29.492 seconds, was scored sixth ahead of Truex and Earnhardt in seventh and eighth. Kyle Busch and Johnson completed the first ten grid positions with lap times of 29.570 and 29.572 seconds.

In the first Saturday session, Edwards was quickest with a fastest lap time of 30.224 seconds, six-thousandths of a second faster than Kahne in second. Keselowski managed to be third-quickest with a fastest lap time of 30.290. Bowyer and Kenseth followed in the fourth and fifth positions. Johnson, Kyle Busch, Montoya, Harvick, and Biffle completed the first ten positions. In the final practice session, Johnson was quickest with a time of 29.735 seconds and a best speed of 186.447 mph (300.057 km/h). Bowyer followed in second, ahead of Edwards and Montoya in third and fourth. Kahne, who was second-quickest in second practice, managed fifth. In the second session, Harvick had the quickest ten consecutive lap average with a speed of 176.789 miles per hour (284.514 km/h), while Edwards had the best average in the final session with a speed of 179.527 miles per hour (288.921 km/h).

=== Race ===
==== Start ====
The race went underway at 7:30 p.m. EDT, with Juan Pablo Montoya leading the field to the green flag, A couple of laps later, the first caution came out on lap 25, this was a scheduled competition caution, the race restarted on lap 30 and the second caution came out for a one car wreck in the entrance of pit road by Kasey Kahne, the race restarted on lap 39, with Carl Edwards, the race leader.

==== Second half ====
Debris on the track brought out the third caution on lap 58, the race restarted on lap 63 with Jeff Gordon the race leader, A couple of laps later, the fourth caution came out on lap 193 when Clint Bowyer blew an engine, the race restarted on lap 198, The fifth caution came out on lap 206 when Denny Hamlin spun out in the back straightaway, the race restarted on lap 212 with Joey Logano the race leader, the sixth caution came out with 42 laps to go when Jimmie Johnson spun out, the race restarted with 33 laps to go, the seventh caution came out when Brian Vickers caught the grass, with 31 laps to go, the race restarted with 28 laps to go, the eighth caution came out for a two-car wreck involving Jeff Burton and Austin Dillon, the race restarted with 22 laps to go with Martin Truex Jr. the race leader, Kyle Busch won his race at Atlanta.

== Results ==
=== Qualifying ===
| Grid | No. | Driver | Team | Manufacturer | Time | Speed |
|---|---|---|---|---|---|---|
| 1 | 17 | Ricky Stenhouse Jr. | Roush Fenway Racing | Ford | 29.227 | 189.688 |
| 2 | 99 | Carl Edwards | Roush Fenway Racing | Ford | 29.330 | 189.021 |
| 3 | 42 | Juan Pablo Montoya | Earnhardt Ganassi Racing | Chevrolet | 29.405 | 188.539 |
| 4 | 11 | Denny Hamlin | Joe Gibbs Racing | Toyota | 29.406 | 188.533 |
| 5 | 24 | Jeff Gordon | Hendrick Motorsports | Chevrolet | 29.481 | 188.053 |
| 6 | 20 | Matt Kenseth | Joe Gibbs Racing | Toyota | 29.492 | 187.983 |
| 7 | 56 | Martin Truex Jr. | Michael Waltrip Racing | Toyota | 29.499 | 187.939 |
| 8 | 88 | Dale Earnhardt Jr. | Hendrick Motorsports | Chevrolet | 29.565 | 187.519 |
| 9 | 18 | Kyle Busch | Joe Gibbs Racing | Toyota | 29.570 | 187.487 |
| 10 | 48 | Jimmie Johnson | Hendrick Motorsports | Chevrolet | 29.572 | 187.475 |
| 11 | 22 | Joey Logano | Penske Racing | Ford | 29.580 | 187.424 |
| 12 | 15 | Clint Bowyer | Michael Waltrip Racing | Toyota | 29.616 | 187.196 |
| 13 | 47 | A. J. Allmendinger | JTG Daugherty Racing | Toyota | 29.646 | 187.007 |
| 14 | 34 | David Ragan | Front Row Motorsports | Ford | 29.658 | 186.931 |
| 15 | 1 | Jamie McMurray | Earnhardt Ganassi Racing | Chevrolet | 29.689 | 186.736 |
| 16 | 27 | Paul Menard | Richard Childress Racing | Chevrolet | 29.699 | 186.673 |
| 17 | 39 | Ryan Newman | Stewart–Haas Racing | Chevrolet | 29.714 | 186.579 |
| 18 | 5 | Kasey Kahne | Hendrick Motorsports | Chevrolet | 29.719 | 186.547 |
| 19 | 13 | Casey Mears | Germain Racing | Ford | 29.731 | 186.472 |
| 20 | 9 | Marcos Ambrose | Richard Petty Motorsports | Ford | 29.760 | 186.290 |
| 21 | 10 | Danica Patrick | Stewart–Haas Racing | Chevrolet | 29.789 | 186.109 |
| 22 | 55 | Brian Vickers | Michael Waltrip Racing | Toyota | 29.829 | 185.859 |
| 23 | 2 | Brad Keselowski | Penske Racing | Ford | 29.851 | 185.722 |
| 24 | 16 | Greg Biffle | Roush Fenway Racing | Ford | 29.872 | 185.592 |
| 25 | 30 | David Stremme | Swan Racing | Toyota | 29.903 | 185.399 |
| 26 | 33 | Austin Dillon | Richard Childress Racing | Chevrolet | 29.914 | 185.331 |
| 27 | 14 | Mark Martin | Stewart–Haas Racing | Chevrolet | 29.929 | 185.238 |
| 28 | 31 | Jeff Burton | Richard Childress Racing | Chevrolet | 29.957 | 185.065 |
| 29 | 43 | Aric Almirola | Richard Petty Motorsports | Ford | 29.986 | 184.886 |
| 30 | 29 | Kevin Harvick | Richard Childress Racing | Chevrolet | 30.011 | 184.732 |
| 31 | 38 | David Gilliland | Front Row Motorsports | Ford | 30.045 | 184.523 |
| 32 | 78 | Kurt Busch | Furniture Row Racing | Chevrolet | 30.049 | 184.499 |
| 33 | 35 | Josh Wise | Front Row Motorsports | Ford | 30.072 | 184.358 |
| 34 | 83 | David Reutimann | BK Racing | Toyota | 30.175 | 183.728 |
| 35 | 95 | Scott Speed | Leavine Family Racing | Ford | 30.337 | 182.747 |
| 36 | 7 | Dave Blaney | Tommy Baldwin Racing | Chevrolet | 30.392 | 182.416 |
| 37 | 93 | Travis Kvapil | BK Racing | Toyota | 30.426 | 182.213 |
| 38 | 51 | Mike Bliss | Phoenix Racing | Chevrolet | 30.473 | 181.932 |
| 39 | 40 | Landon Cassill | Circle Sport | Chevrolet | 30.550 | 181.473 |
| 40 | 87 | Joe Nemechek | NEMCO-Jay Robinson Racing | Toyota | 30.593 | 181.218 |
| 41 | 32 | Timmy Hill | FAS Lane Racing | Ford | 30.863 | 179.633 |
| 42 | 36 | J. J. Yeley | Tommy Baldwin Racing | Chevrolet | 30.994 | 178.873 |
| 43 | 98 | Michael McDowell | Phil Parsons Racing | Ford | – | – |
Qualifying Results

=== Race results ===
| Pos | No. | Driver | Team | Manufacturer | Laps | Led | Points^{1} |
|---|---|---|---|---|---|---|---|
| 1 | 18 | Kyle Busch | Joe Gibbs Racing | Toyota | 325 | 36 | 47 |
| 2 | 22 | Joey Logano | Penske Racing | Ford | 325 | 78 | 44 |
| 3 | 56 | Martin Truex Jr. | Michael Waltrip Racing | Toyota | 325 | 0 | 41 |
| 4 | 78 | Kurt Busch | Furniture Row Racing | Chevrolet | 325 | 0 | 40 |
| 5 | 39 | Ryan Newman | Stewart–Haas Racing | Chevrolet | 325 | 3 | 40 |
| 6 | 24 | Jeff Gordon | Hendrick Motorsports | Chevrolet | 325 | 17 | 39 |
| 7 | 42 | Juan Pablo Montoya | Earnhardt Ganassi Racing | Chevrolet | 325 | 38 | 38 |
| 8 | 88 | Dale Earnhardt Jr. | Hendrick Motorsports | Chevrolet | 325 | 0 | 36 |
| 9 | 29 | Kevin Harvick | Richard Childress Racing | Chevrolet | 325 | 0 | 35 |
| 10 | 55 | Brian Vickers | Michael Waltrip Racing | Toyota | 325 | 0 | 0 |
| 11 | 1 | Jamie McMurray | Earnhardt Ganassi Racing | Chevrolet | 325 | 0 | 33 |
| 12 | 20 | Matt Kenseth | Joe Gibbs Racing | Toyota | 325 | 0 | 32 |
| 13 | 9 | Marcos Ambrose | Richard Petty Motorsports | Ford | 325 | 0 | 31 |
| 14 | 47 | A. J. Allmendinger | JTG Daugherty Racing | Toyota | 325 | 0 | 30 |
| 15 | 16 | Greg Biffle | Roush Fenway Racing | Ford | 325 | 0 | 29 |
| 16 | 17 | Ricky Stenhouse Jr. | Roush Fenway Racing | Ford | 325 | 0 | 28 |
| 17 | 38 | David Gilliland | Front Row Motorsports | Ford | 325 | 0 | 27 |
| 18 | 99 | Carl Edwards | Roush Fenway Racing | Ford | 324 | 68 | 27 |
| 19 | 33 | Austin Dillon | Richard Childress Racing | Chevrolet | 324 | 0 | 0 |
| 20 | 43 | Aric Almirola | Richard Petty Motorsports | Ford | 323 | 0 | 24 |
| 21 | 10 | Danica Patrick | Stewart–Haas Racing | Chevrolet | 323 | 0 | 23 |
| 22 | 13 | Casey Mears | Germain Racing | Ford | 323 | 1 | 23 |
| 23 | 34 | David Ragan | Front Row Motorsports | Ford | 323 | 1 | 22 |
| 24 | 27 | Paul Menard | Richard Childress Racing | Chevrolet | 322 | 0 | 20 |
| 25 | 14 | Mark Martin | Stewart–Haas Racing | Chevrolet | 322 | 0 | 19 |
| 26 | 7 | Dave Blaney | Tommy Baldwin Racing | Chevrolet | 322 | 0 | 18 |
| 27 | 93 | Travis Kvapil | BK Racing | Toyota | 322 | 0 | 17 |
| 28 | 48 | Jimmie Johnson | Hendrick Motorsports | Chevrolet | 321 | 0 | 16 |
| 29 | 30 | David Stremme | Swan Racing | Toyota | 321 | 0 | 15 |
| 30 | 36 | J. J. Yeley | Tommy Baldwin Racing | Chevrolet | 321 | 2 | 15 |
| 31 | 32 | Timmy Hill | FAS Lane Racing | Ford | 321 | 0 | 13 |
| 32 | 83 | David Reutimann | BK Racing | Toyota | 320 | 0 | 12 |
| 33 | 51 | Mike Bliss | Phoenix Racing | Chevrolet | 319 | 0 | 0 |
| 34 | 31 | Jeff Burton | Richard Childress Racing | Chevrolet | 319 | 0 | 10 |
| 35 | 2 | Brad Keselowski | Penske Racing | Ford | 307 | 31 | 10 |
| 36 | 5 | Kasey Kahne | Hendrick Motorsports | Chevrolet | 292 | 0 | 8 |
| 37 | 40 | Landon Cassill | Circle Sport | Chevrolet | 249 | 1 | 0 |
| 38 | 11 | Denny Hamlin | Joe Gibbs Racing | Toyota | 231 | 0 | 6 |
| 39 | 15 | Clint Bowyer | Michael Waltrip Racing | Toyota | 192 | 48 | 6 |
| 40 | 87 | Joe Nemechek | NEMCO Motorsports | Toyota | 114 | 0 | 0 |
| 41 | 35 | Josh Wise | Front Row Motorsports | Ford | 94 | 0 | 0 |
| 42 | 98 | Michael McDowell | Phil Parsons Racing | Ford | 92 | 1 | 3 |
| 43 | 95 | Scott Speed | Leavine Family Racing | Ford | 22 | 0 | 1 |
Race Results

Notes

^1 Points include 3 Chase for the Sprint Cup points for winning, 1 point for leading a lap, and 1 point for most laps led.

== Standings after the race ==
Drivers' Championship standings

| | Pos | Driver | Points |
|---|---|---|---|
| | 1 | Jimmie Johnson | 837 |
| | 2 | Clint Bowyer | 809 (-28) |
| 1 | 3 | Kevin Harvick | 795 (-42) |
| 1 | 4 | Carl Edwards | 795 (-42) |
| | 5 | Kyle Busch | 786 (-51) |
| | 6 | Matt Kenseth | 768 (-69) |
| | 7 | Dale Earnhardt Jr. | 750 (-87) |
| 2 | 8 | Joey Logano | 729 (-108) |
| | 9 | Greg Biffle | 727 (-110) |
| 2 | 10 | Kurt Busch | 719 (-118) |

Manufacturers' Championship standings

| Pos | Manufacturer | Points |
|---|---|---|
| 1 | Chevrolet | 172 |
| 2 | Toyota | 166 (-6) |
| 3 | Ford | 130 (-42) |

- Note: Only the first twelve positions are included for the driver standings.

| Previous race: 2013 Irwin Tools Night Race | Sprint Cup Series; 2013 season | Next race: 2013 Federated Auto Parts 400 |
