= A. J. Allmendinger =

American racing driver (born 1981)

- Allmendinger at Las Vegas Motor Speedway in 2026
- Born: Anthony James Allmendinger; December 16, 1981 (age 44); Santa Clara, California, U.S.
- Height: 5 ft 6 in (1.68 m)
- Achievements: 2021, 2022 NASCAR Xfinity Series Regular Season Champion; 2x IKF Champion; 2002 Barber Dodge Pro Series Champion; 2003 Champ Car Atlantic Champion; 2008, 2018 Monster Energy Open Winner; 2012 Rolex 24 at Daytona Winner
- Awards: 2004 Champ Car World Series Rookie of the Year; West Coast Stock Car Hall of Fame (2025)

NASCAR Cup Series career
- 518 races run over 19 years
- Car no., team: No. 16 (Kaulig Racing)
- 2026 position: 25th
- Best finish: 13th (2014)
- First race: 2007 Food City 500 (Bristol)
- Last race: 2026 Season Finale 400 (Homestead)
- First win: 2014 Cheez-It 355 at The Glen (Watkins Glen)
- Last win: 2023 Bank of America Roval 400 (Charlotte Roval)
Wins	Top tens	Poles
3	91	5

NASCAR O'Reilly Auto Parts Series career
- 131 races run over 10 years
- 2024 position: 3rd
- Best finish: 3rd (2024)
- First race: 2007 Camping World 300 (Fontana)
- Last race: 2024 NASCAR Xfinity Series Championship Race (Phoenix)
- First win: 2013 Johnsonville Sausage 200 (Road America)
- Last win: 2024 Ambetter Health 302 (Las Vegas)
Wins	Top tens	Poles
18	86	11

NASCAR FedEx Freight Truck Series career
- 16 races run over 5 years
- 2026 position: 107th
- Best finish: 34th (2007)
- First race: 2006 New Hampshire 200 (New Hampshire)
- Last race: 2026 Bully Hill Vineyards 176 at The Glen (Watkins Glen)
Wins	Top tens	Poles
0	4	0

IndyCar Series career
- 6 races run over 1 year
- 2013 position: 27th
- Best finish: 27th (2013)
- First race: 2013 Indy Grand Prix of Alabama (Birmingham)
- Last race: 2013 MAVTV 500 IndyCar World Championships (California)
Wins	Podiums	Poles
0	0	0

Champ Car career
- 40 races run over 3 years
- Best finish: 3rd (2006)
- First race: 2004 Toyota Grand Prix of Long Beach (Long Beach)
- Last race: 2006 Lexmark Indy 300 (Surfers Paradise)
- First win: 2006 Grand Prix of Portland (Portland)
- Last win: 2006 Grand Prix of Road America (Road America)
Wins	Podiums	Poles
5	14	2
- Statistics up to date as of November 8, 2026.

Anthony James Allmendinger (born December 16, 1981), nicknamed "the Dinger,” is an American professional stock car racing driver. He competes full-time in the NASCAR Cup Series, driving the No. 16 Dodge for Kaulig Racing.

Allmendinger's professional racing career began on the American open-wheel circuit. He earned five wins and third place overall in the 2006 Champ Car season. Allmendinger then began competing in NASCAR for Team Red Bull. He later drove for Richard Petty Motorsports, Penske Racing, Phoenix Racing, and JTG Daugherty Racing in the Cup Series. When he lost his full-time Cup Series ride with JTGD in 2019 to Ryan Preece, he became a part-time driver for Kaulig in the Xfinity Series and part-time television broadcaster for NBC, working as a color commentator for IMSA races and an analyst on NASCAR America until 2021 when he returned to driving full-time.

Moreover, Allmendinger competed in the 24 Hours of Daytona for Michael Shank's team in all but one year (2017) from 2006 to 2021, winning the event in 2012.

== Early career ==
Allmendinger started his racing career at the age of five, racing BMX bikes. He advanced to quarter-midgets on ovals on the West Coast by the time he was eight, and within a few years, he began racing karts, winning two International Kart Federation Grand National championships.

Allmendinger participated in the Formula Dodge National Championship in 2001, which earned him a spot in the Barber Dodge Pro Series championship in 2002, a championship he won. He also raced in New Zealand in 2002 in the New Zealand Formula Ford Championship. In 2003, he was signed to Carl Russo's RuSPORT team and won the Champ Car Atlantic Championship, winning nine pole positions and seven races.

== American open-wheel racing ==
=== 2004–2006: RuSPORT ===
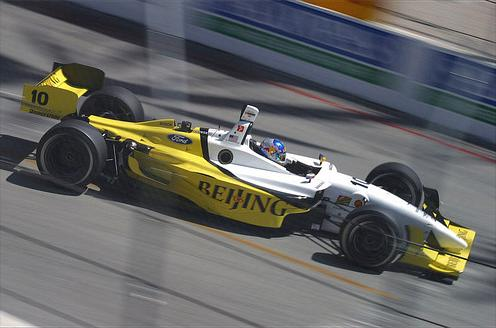
Allmendinger competing at Long Beach in 2005

On February 29, 2004, RuSPORT announced their entry into the Champ Car World Series, fielding two entries for Allmendinger and Michel Jourdain Jr. Around this time, Red Bull signed Allmendinger to their family of athletes. Allmendinger scored his first podium of the season in the Grand Prix of Vancouver. In the second half of the season, Allmendinger finished sixth place or higher five times, including another podium finish in Mexico City. Allmendinger ended the season sixth in points, winning the Roshfrans Rookie of the Year Award over Justin Wilson.

In 2005, Wilson replaced Jourdain Jr. at RuSPORT, becoming Allmendinger's teammate. Throughout the season, Allmendinger finished on the podium five times, finishing runner-up in four of those podium finishes. In July, Allmendinger qualified on pole for the first time in his Champ Car World Series career at the Grand Prix of Edmonton.

=== 2006: Multiple wins with Forsythe ===
On June 9, 2006, after four races in the season, RuSPORT announced that Allmendinger would be replaced by 2002 CART champion Cristiano da Matta, as the team believed that de Matta would be a better challenger against Sébastien Bourdais, who had swept the first four races of the season. Five days later, Forsythe Championship Racing announced Allmendinger as their new driver, replacing Mario Domínguez. In the first race with Forsythe, Allmendinger won the Grand Prix of Portland. Allmendinger won the next two races at the Grand Prix of Cleveland and the Grand Prix of Toronto, giving him three consecutive victories in the first three races since his departure from RuSPORT. Allmendinger would enter the eighth race of the season second place in the standings behind Bourdais.

Allmendinger earned two more wins during the 2006 season, winning the Grand Prix of Denver and Road America. Despite being second in points heading into the final race of the season, Allmendinger left Champ Car before the race to accept a lucrative offer from NASCAR's Red Bull Racing Team. In 2007, Allmendinger commented that a lack of marketing and sponsorship due to the CART-IRL split played a role in him and several other open-wheel drivers moving to NASCAR, adding "it needs to be one series. To have all the best open-wheel drivers on this continent racing against each other, you'd hopefully get some sponsors back and get a decent TV package."

=== 2013: Return to IndyCar with Team Penske ===
It was reported in late 2012 that Allmendinger could move to the now-unified IndyCar Series with Michael Shank Racing, which he co-owned, for the 2013 season. This failed to materialize; instead, he participated in IndyCar's winter testing at Sebring with Team Penske. In March, it was announced that Allmendinger would compete part-time in the IndyCar series for the team at Barber Motorsports Park and in the 2013 Indianapolis 500, with the goal of adding more races later in the season. After finishing 19th in his IndyCar debut, Allmendinger was put back into the car for the following race at Long Beach. In May, Team Penske announced that Allmendinger would participate in the Chevrolet Indy Dual races in Detroit.

Allmendinger qualified fifth for the 2013 Indianapolis 500. He led 23 laps and finished seventh despite pitting with around seventy laps to go due to his seatbelt loosening during the race. Allmendinger failed to complete a lap in the Chevy Indy Dual races, crashing out in the first race on lap one after contact with Scott Dixon and crashing out on lap 1 in the second race after hitting the wall. In October, it was announced that Allmendinger would race in the season finale at Fontana in an attempt to help Hélio Castroneves win the championship. Allmendinger would qualify second in the race behind polesitter and teammate Will Power. He would finish in sixteenth after crashing on lap 190.

Despite claiming he would be willing to race full-time in IndyCar if Roger Penske offered, Allmendinger hasn't raced in the series since. After the death of Justin Wilson, who died after getting struck in the helmet with debris in a 2015 IndyCar race at Pocono, Allmendinger stated that he would not return to IndyCar unless IndyCar made safety modifications to the cockpit. Despite IndyCar introducing the aeroscreen in 2020 and NASCAR driver Kyle Larson running in the 2024 Indianapolis 500, Allmendinger has stated he is not considering running another race in IndyCar.

== NASCAR ==
=== 2006: Stock car debut ===
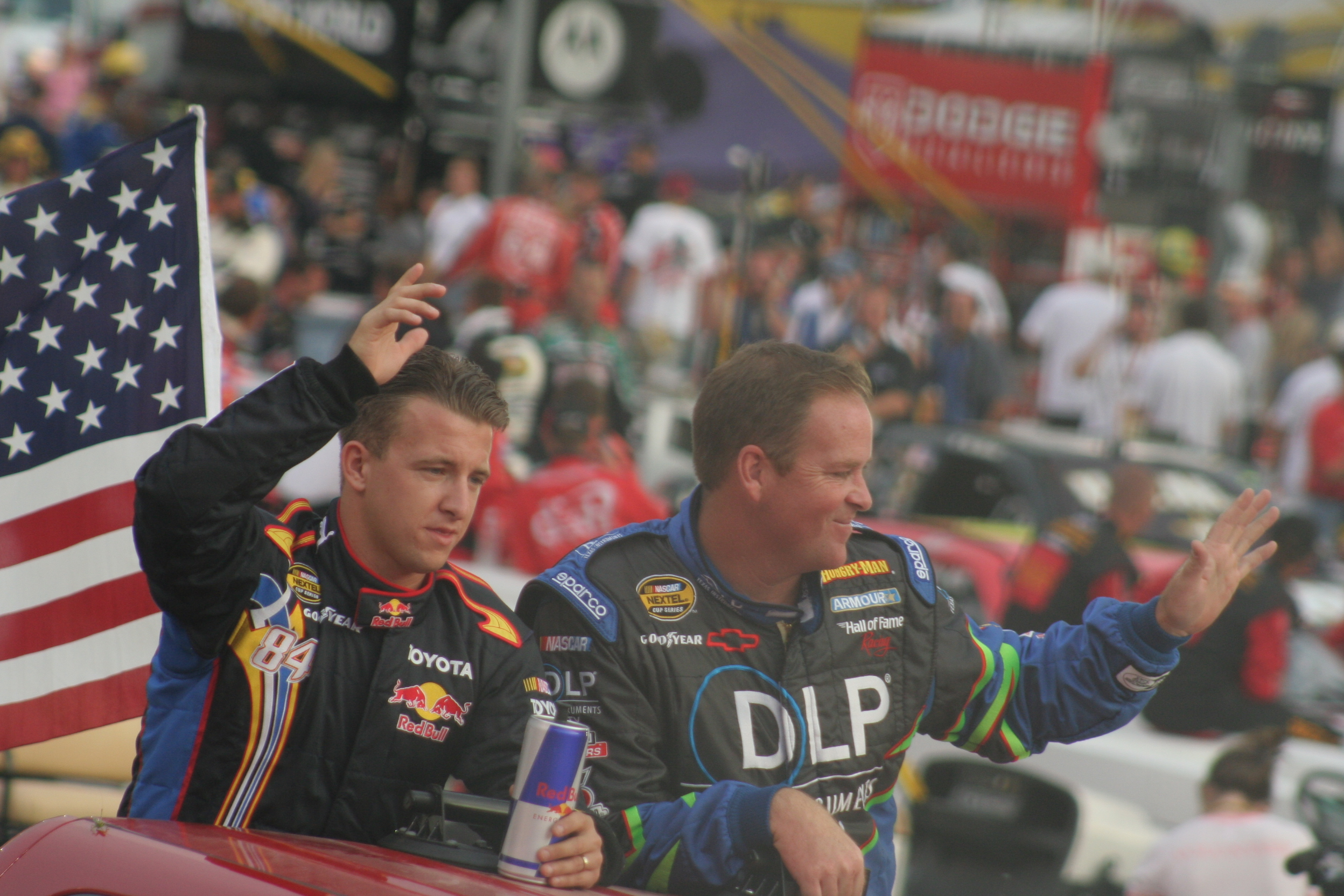
Allmendinger (left) and Tony Raines in 2007

Allmendinger made his NASCAR debut in the Craftsman Truck Series driving for Bill Davis Racing at New Hampshire International Speedway on September 16, 2006, in the No. 24 Toyota Tundra. He crashed his primary truck in qualifying but started the race 32nd in a backup truck from teammate Bill Lester and finished on the lead lap in 13th. He also competed at the Talladega Superspeedway in October with a fifth-place finish. In his third career truck series start, he qualified in second place at Atlanta and led five laps before he wrecked and finished 34th.

Red Bull officially announced Allmendinger as part of its 2007 Nextel Cup Series driver lineup on October 25, 2006. He attempted his first Cup Series event at Atlanta in October 2006 driving the No. 84 Red Bull-sponsored Dodge Charger, however, due to qualifying being rained out, a lack of owner's points prevented Allmendinger from making the race. He also attempted to make the race at Texas Motor Speedway, failing to qualify again.

=== 2007–2008: Red Bull ===
Allmendinger and Brian Vickers were named Red Bull's drivers for 2007, with Allmendinger piloting the team's No. 84 Toyota Camry with Vickers in the team's No. 83. Allmendinger failed to qualify for the 2007 Daytona 500 after a crash in the first Gatorade Duel race. He also failed to qualify for the next three races before making his first Cup start at the fifth race of the season, the Food City 500 at Bristol. As the season progressed, Allmendinger made a handful of races, predominantly in the "Car of Tomorrow.” Allmendinger failed to qualify in nineteen races that season, running a total of seventeen races at the end of the season. To assist him in the transition to stock cars, he participated in selected Craftsman Truck Series races in the No. 00 Toyota Tundra for Darrell Waltrip Motorsports, and in the No. 42 Chip Ganassi Racing Dodge Charger in the Busch Series. In May, in the Craftman Truck Series race at Charlotte, Allmendinger ran towards the front of the field for the first time in his career, leading seven laps during the race. He would finish in second place in the race after being held off by Ron Hornaday Jr. on a green–white–checkered finish.

Allmendinger again failed to qualify for the 2008 Daytona 500. After three failures to qualify in two attempts (qualifying for the second race of the season, Fontana, was rained out and set by 2007 owner's points), he was temporarily replaced by veteran driver Mike Skinner. Allmendinger returned to the Cup Series at Talladega. On May 17, 2008, he won the Sprint Showdown at Lowe's Motor Speedway during NASCAR's annual All-Star weekend. The win qualified Allmendinger for the Sprint All-Star Race later that evening, where he finished seventeenth. Due to Allmendinger's eleventh-place finish at Watkins Glen, for the first time in his career, he had a guaranteed starting spot for the next race. He had his best career finish at the time at Kansas, finishing in ninth, but was released from the team two days later. He was replaced for the rest of the season by Scott Speed and Mike Skinner. Allmendinger raced with Michael Waltrip Racing for one race in the No. 00 and Evernham Motorsports for the last five races in the No. 10. Allmendinger posted two top-tens and improved in making races by only failing to qualify for just the first three races.

=== 2008–2011: Richard Petty Motorsports ===
After signing a one-race contract with Michael Waltrip Racing, Allmendinger replaced fellow former open-wheel star Patrick Carpentier at Gillett Evernham Motorsports, scoring an average finish of 15.4 over five races in the team's No. 10 Valvoline-sponsored Dodge. During the offseason, as part of the merger between GEM and Petty Enterprises, Allmendinger was to move to the No. 19 Best Buy-sponsored Dodge replacing Elliott Sadler. However, Sadler was still under contract for the 2010 season and announced he would file suit against Allmendinger and the organization. In early January 2009, Richard Petty Motorsports announced a settlement where Sadler would remain in the No. 19 and Allmendinger would return to his 2008 team, which was renumbered 44. However, Valvoline did not commit to sponsoring the team full-time, and they were forced to race without full-time sponsorship.

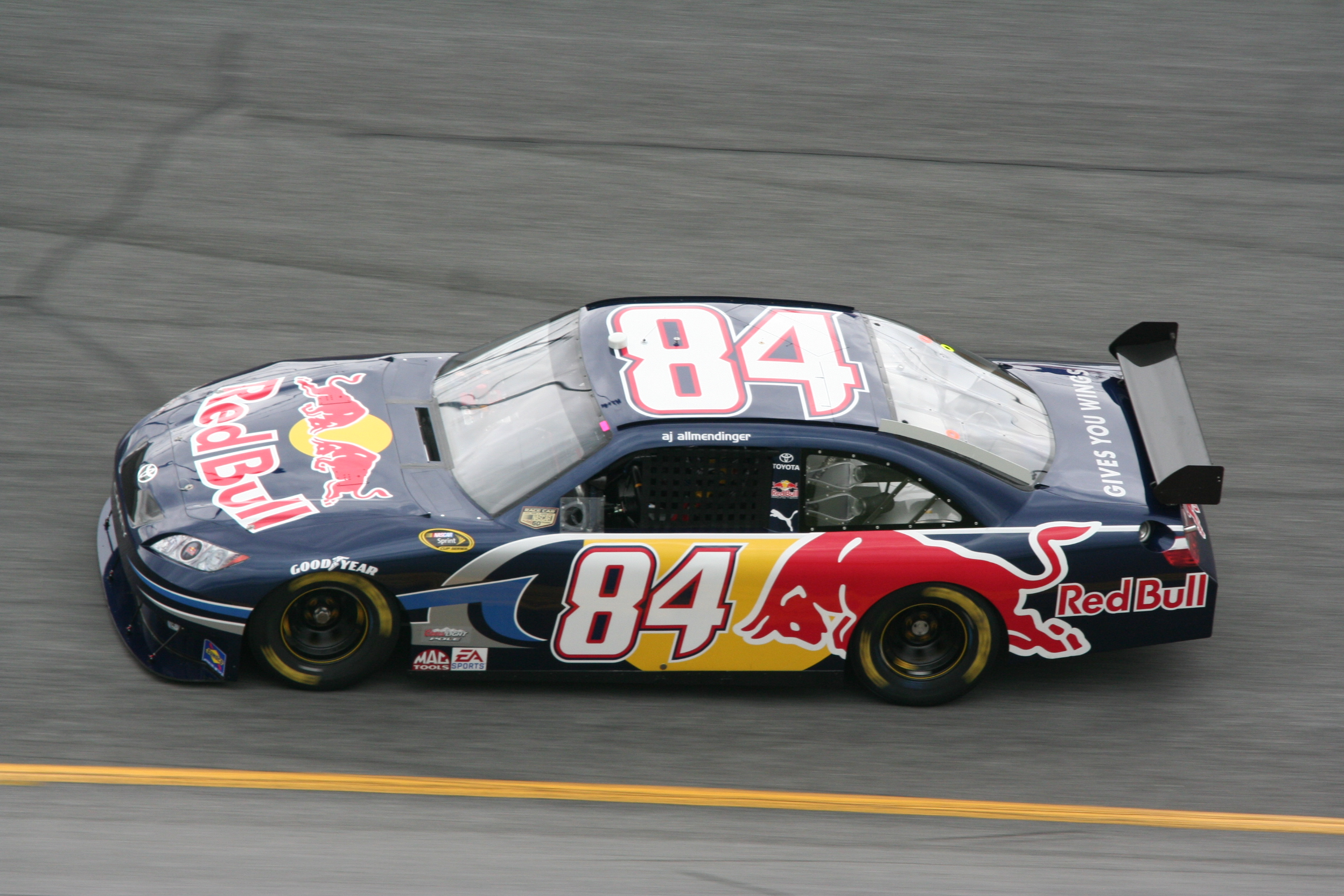
2008 Sprint Cup Series car

Allmendinger's team ended the 2008 season 36th in owner's points, meaning it did not have exemptions for the first five races of 2009. The retro-styled Valvoline 44 raced its way into the Daytona 500, and third in his Daytona 500 debut, also his personal best, and is the fourth-best Daytona 500 debut behind Lee Petty in the 1959 Daytona 500, Scott Wimmer in the 2004 Daytona 500 and Trevor Bayne in the 2011 Daytona 500. Allmendinger was one of two go-or-go-home drivers (the other being Tony Stewart, but Stewart had the past champion's provisional available) to successfully attempt the first five races of the 2009 season.

At 1:27 a.m. on October 29, 2009, Allmendinger was arrested for drunk driving by Mooresville, North Carolina police. He registered a .08 blood alcohol level according to a police report. NASCAR placed him on probation for the rest of the 2009 season. Allmendinger drove a Ford Fusion in the final three races of the season as part of RPM's transition from Dodge to Ford.

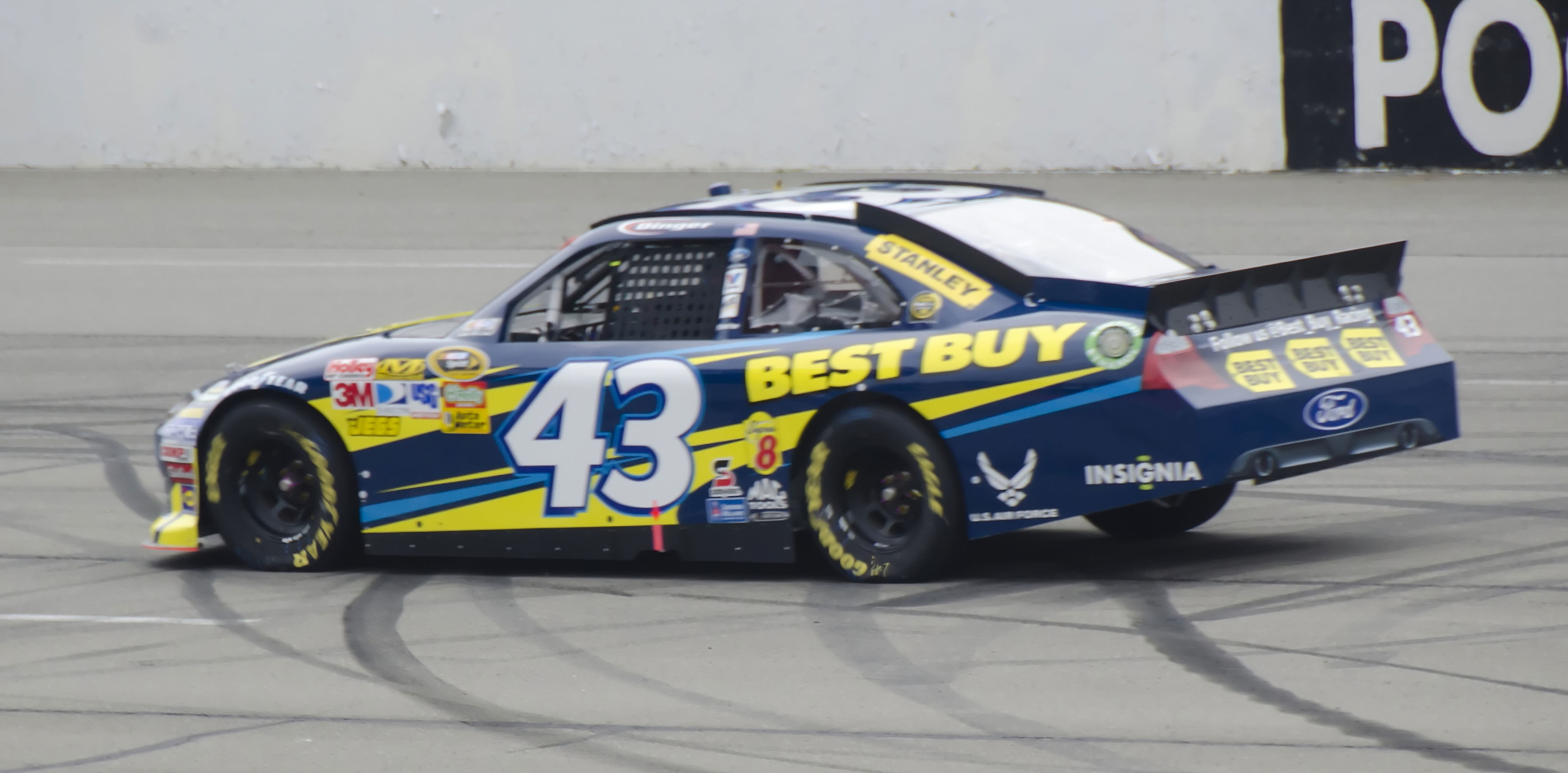
2011 Sprint Cup Series car

During the offseason, Allmendinger replaced Reed Sorenson in the team's famous No. 43 car. He collected two top-fives, eight top-tens, and a pole position in 2010, and finished nineteenth in the final standings.

After finishing eleventh in the 2011 Daytona 500, Allmendinger started the season tenth in points, driving the No. 43 Ford sponsored by Best Buy. Allmendinger continued to have a career-best year in 2011 with ten top-ten finishes and an average finish of sixteenth. He finished the 2011 regular season contending for a wild card spot in the Chase for the Sprint Cup, but came up just short. Three races before setting the field for the Chase, RPM put former Roush Fenway Racing crew chief Greg Erwin on the pit box starting at the 2011 Brickyard 400. Allmendinger and Erwin recorded six top-ten finishes after their pairing. Allmendinger finished the 2011 season a career-best fifteenth in the points. Allmendinger also announced that he would have a partnership stake in Mike Shank's IndyCar team, MSR Indy.

=== 2012: Team Penske, suspension ===
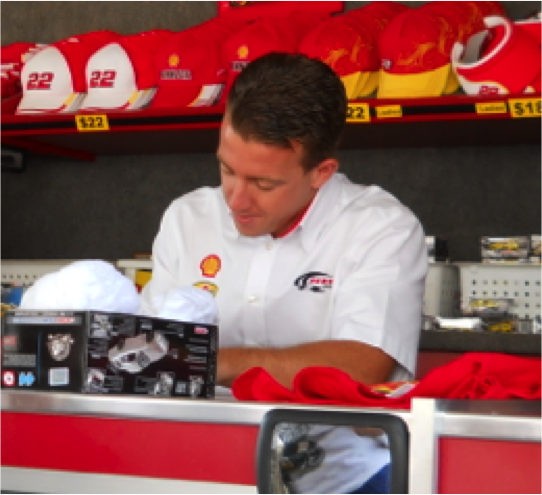
Allmendinger signing autographs prior to the 2012 FedEx 400

At the end of the 2011 season, Allmendinger left Richard Petty Motorsports when the driving spot for Penske Racing's No. 22 Shell/Pennzoil-sponsored Dodge became open after the parting ways of Kurt Busch and Penske. Before his suspension, his best finish was a second at Martinsville Speedway.

After failing a random drug test on July 7, 2012, Allmendinger was suspended from participation in the Coke Zero 400. Steve O'Donnell, NASCAR's senior vice president for racing operations, said that Allmendinger had up to 72 hours to request a B test sample. The next day, Penske said before the Honda Indy Toronto race that Allmendinger's B sample would be tested on Monday or Tuesday. Allmendinger requested a B sample test on July 9, 2012. On July 11, 2012, Allmendinger's camp said a stimulant caused the positive drug test. The B sample test had not yet been scheduled at that time.

On July 24, 2012, it was announced by NASCAR that Allmendinger was suspended indefinitely after the B sample tested positive for a banned stimulant, which was revealed to be amphetamine. He chose to participate in the Road to Recovery program. On August 1, 2012, he was released from his contract by Penske Racing. Allmendinger was replaced in the No. 22 by Sam Hornish Jr.; he later stated that the cause of the positive test was Adderall that he had unknowingly taken, being told it was an "energy pill". Allmendinger was reinstated by NASCAR on September 18, 2012, after completing the Road to Recovery program.

In October 2012, Allmendinger returned to NASCAR at Charlotte Motor Speedway, driving for Phoenix Racing, substituting for Phoenix's intended driver Regan Smith, who had been hired by Hendrick Motorsports to drive the No. 88 for Charlotte and Kansas while Dale Earnhardt Jr. was sidelined with a concussion.

=== 2013: Nationwide success, part-time in Cup ===
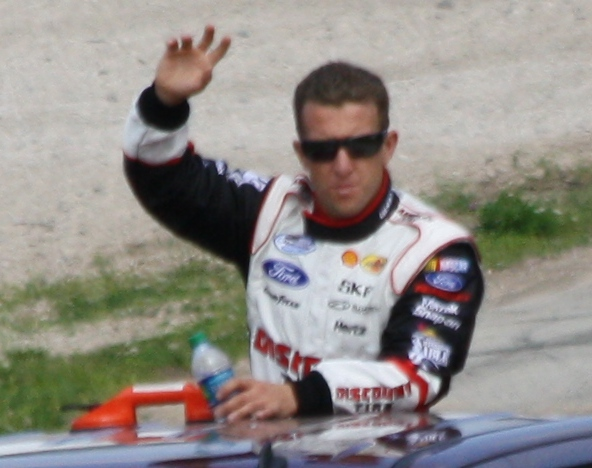
Allmendinger in 2013 prior to his Road America win

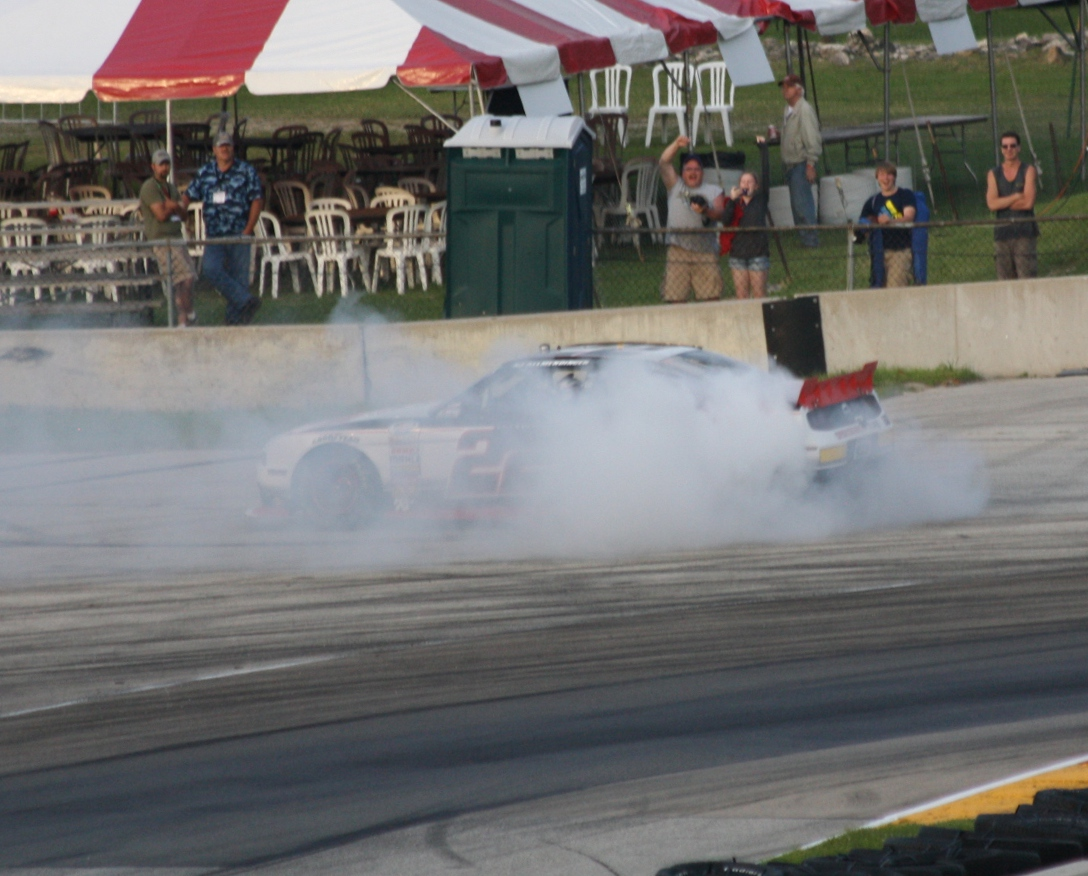
Allmendinger celebrating his win at Road America

On June 1, 2013, Roger Penske announced that Allmendinger would drive for his team at Road America and the Mid-Ohio Sports Car Course. In his first race of the season, the Johnsonville Sausage 200 on June 22, 2013, he won after winning the pole position and leading 29 laps, which was the most of any driver. At Mid-Ohio in August, Allmendinger dominated the race, saving fuel through a green–white–checkered finish to win and sweep the year's Nationwide Series road-course races for Penske Racing.

==== Sprint Cup Series ====
Allmendinger drove part-time for Phoenix Racing in the No. 51 Chevrolet in the Sprint Cup Series. He had several strong finishes in the first part of the season: eleventh at Phoenix, thirteenth at Bristol, sixteenth at Fontana, and fourteenth at Richmond. His first finish worse than twentieth was at Pocono, where he finished 33rd. Afterward, Allmendinger moved to the No. 47 Toyota at JTG Daugherty Racing in place of Bobby Labonte for two races, with a nineteenth-place finish at Michigan and a 22nd-place finish at Kentucky. At Daytona, Allmendinger returned to the No. 51 and was running near the top-ten for almost the entire night until lap 148, when he was part of a wreck in the tri-oval with Denny Hamlin, Jeff Gordon, Matt Kenseth, and David Reutimann, reducing Allmendinger to a 35th-place finish.

Returning to the No. 47 at Watkins Glen, Allmendinger had another breakout run, qualifying fourth, and running in the top fifteen for most of the day, finishing in tenth place.

On August 29, 2013, the Sporting News reported that Allmendinger would be the full-time driver for JTG Daugherty Racing in 2014. This was confirmed a month later with Allmendinger signing a multi-year deal with the team.

=== 2014: Breakthrough Cup victory ===
Allmendinger had a few poor opening races, but did well at Fontana, recovering from a late speeding penalty to finish eighth, as well as having top-tens at Richmond and Talladega.

At Sonoma, Allmendinger qualified on the front row with Jamie McMurray. Allmendinger led the most laps and was in position to possibly earn his first Sprint Cup victory when he was wrecked by Dale Earnhardt Jr. with 25 laps to go. Allmendinger was visibly upset with Earnhardt Jr. in post-race ceremonies.

At Watkins Glen, Allmendinger took the lead with less than 30 laps to go after a side-by-side battle with former teammate Marcos Ambrose and kept the lead until the checkered flag, earning his first Sprint Cup Series win after 213 Sprint Cup starts, leading 30 laps in the process. "My gosh, I can't believe we won a NASCAR Sprint Cup race. This whole 47 team... all the sponsors, my first Cup victory. I love these guys. I just wanted it so bad for them. For this team. They worked so hard. I wasn't going to let Marcos take that from me. I hope the fans loved that race and at home. Because it was fun in the race car." Ambrose commented on Allmendinger's win: "First of all, congratulations to A. J. and the 47 team. They deserved that win. I left nothing on the table. I tried to rattle his cage and couldn't shake him. We raced fair and square to the end there. It was a tough couple laps but it was fair. We were both giving it to each other pretty hard. No harm, no foul. We just came up a little short." Before the race, Allmendinger had announced that Kimberly-Clark Corporation (consisting of Scott, Viva, Kleenex, Cottonelle, and Huggies brands) extended its sponsorship agreement with the team through 2017.

=== 2015 ===
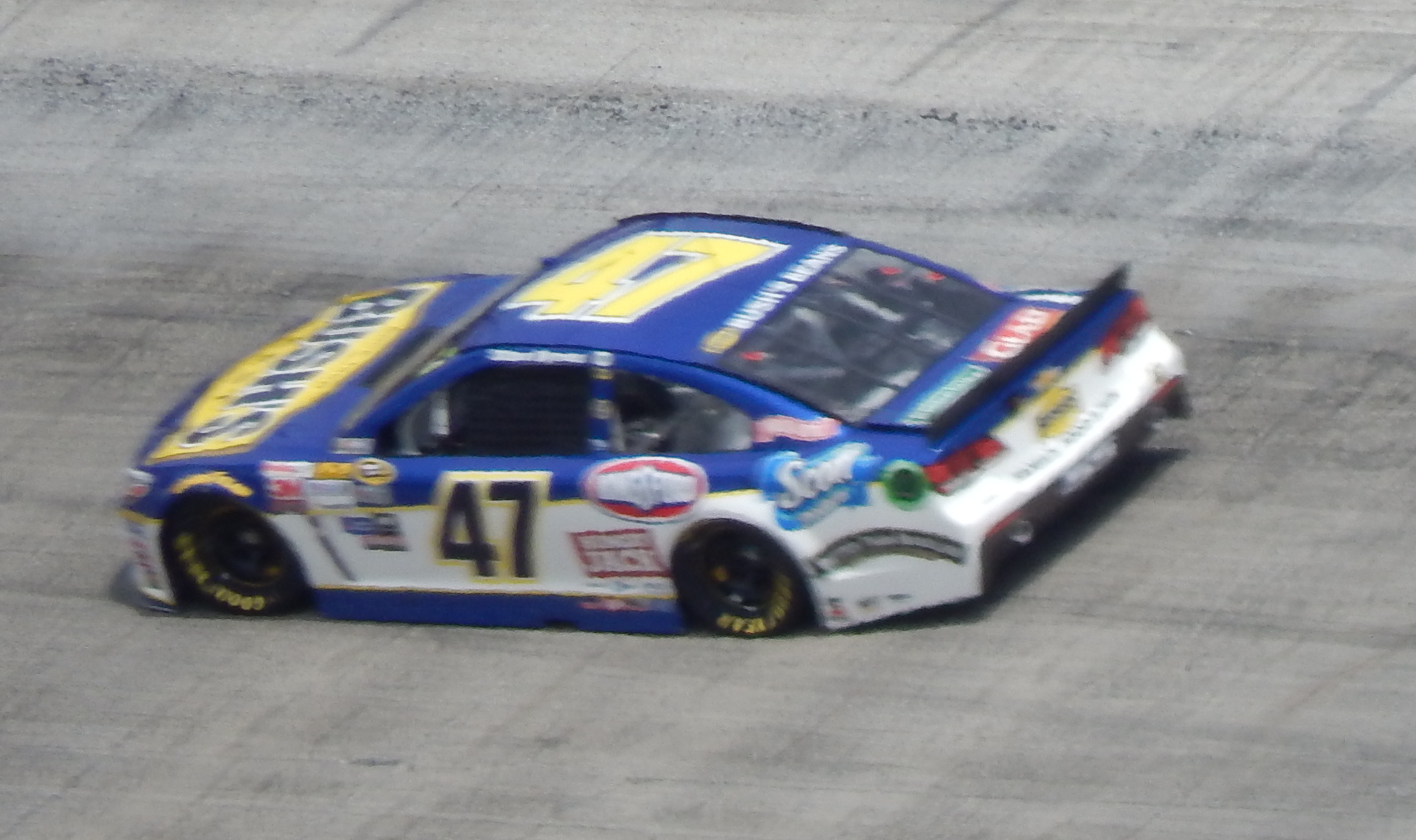
Allmendinger at the 2015 Food City 500

Though NASCAR expanded the grid of the Sprint Unlimited to include all the Chase drivers, Allmendinger declined the invitation, saying he wanted to save his equipment for the points races such as the Daytona 500. Instead, he joined the Motor Racing Network's radio broadcast of the race, working in the booth alongside Joe Moore and Jeff Striegle.

Allmendinger got his season off to a good start, leading a few laps during the Daytona 500. The next week at Atlanta, he finished seventh and sixth one week later at Las Vegas. On May 9, 2015, Allmendinger announced plans to sign a five-year contract extension with JTG Daugherty, allowing him to remain with the team through the 2020 season.

=== 2016 ===
Allmendinger nearly pulled off an upset at the 2016 STP 500 at Martinsville. He charged hard from thirteenth place with less than twenty laps to go, to finish second to Kyle Busch by 1.547 seconds. It tied 2012 as his career-best finish at Martinsville. Allmendinger ended the season on a high note, earning four top-tens in the final six races and finishing nineteenth in the standings.

On June 8, 2016, Richard Childress Racing announced plans to add Allmendinger to their Xfinity Series driver lineup, hiring him to drive the No. 2 Chevrolet Camaro at Mid-Ohio; however, Allmendinger had a schedule conflict and Sam Hornish Jr. drove the race instead.

=== 2017 ===
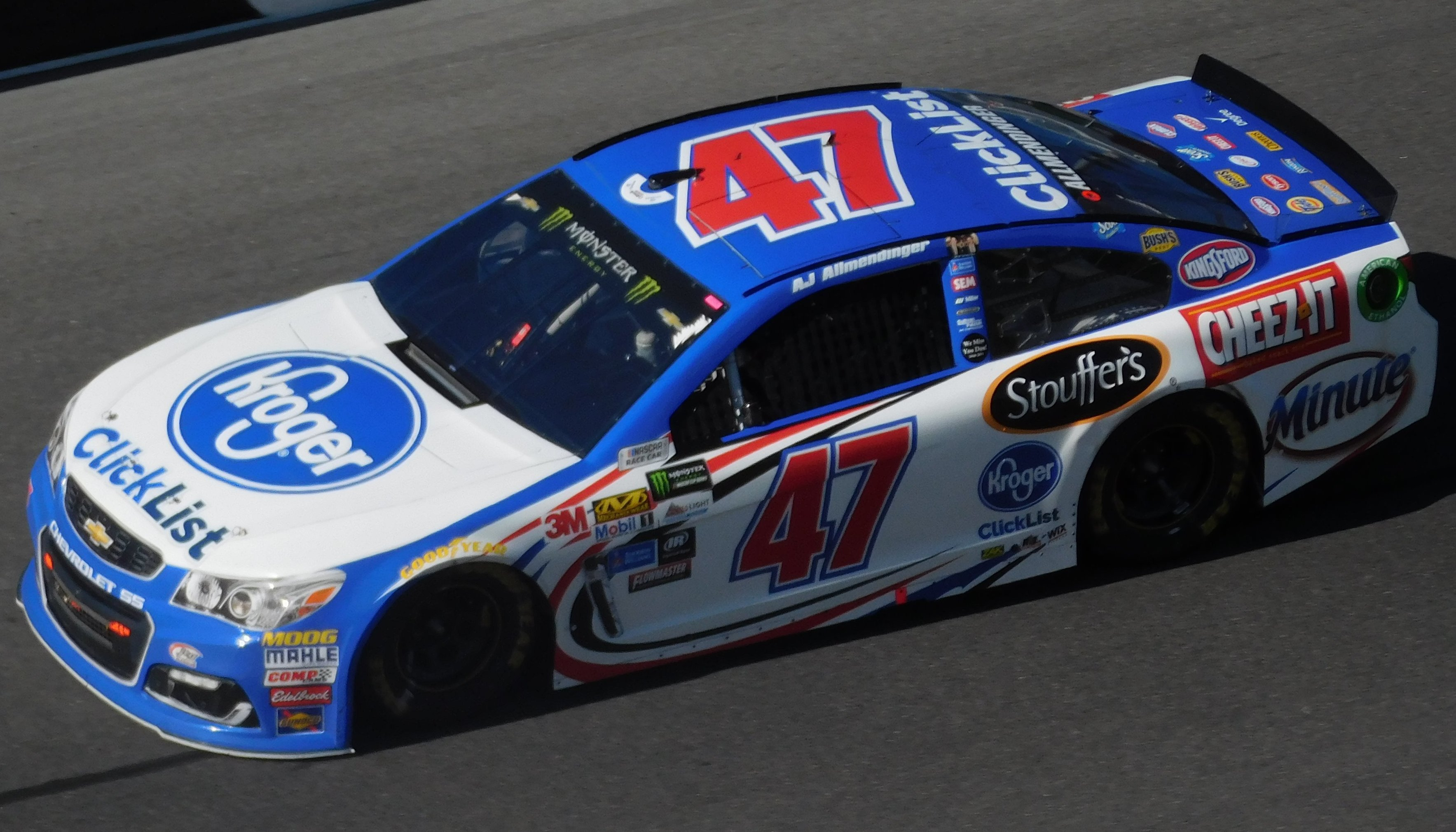
Allmendinger on track at Daytona in 2017

Allmendinger started the 2017 season at Daytona by finishing in third place, equalling his best career finish in the event. At Talladega, Allmendinger was caught in a multi-car accident while running third with nineteen laps to go. Allmendinger got loose drafting Chase Elliott, causing Allmendinger's car to spin out and eventually flip over. At Watkins Glen, Allmendinger ran well enough to be the highest-finishing Chevrolet in the race, placing ninth.

=== 2018 ===
Allmendinger opened the 2018 season with a top-ten finish in the Daytona 500 and later had an eighth-place finish at the STP 500. In May, Allmendinger won the Monster Energy Open, the second time he had taken victory in the race.

On September 25, 2018, it was announced that Allmendinger, despite having two years left on his contract from 2015, would part ways with JTG at the end of the 2018 season, ending a long-time relationship with the team.

=== 2019–2020: Part-time with Kaulig Racing ===
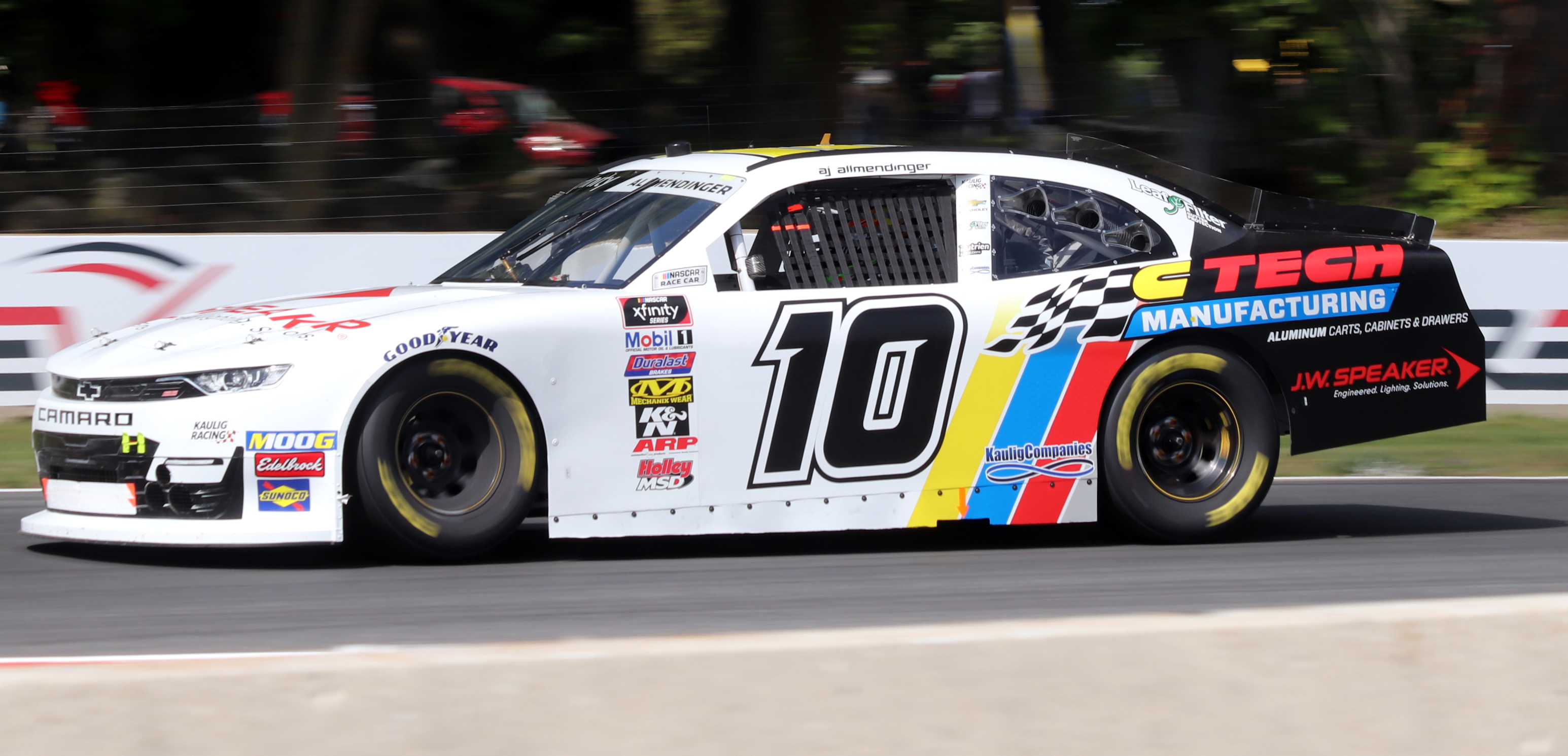
Allmendinger in 2019 at Road America

On March 21, 2019, Kaulig Racing announced Allmendinger would join the team's No. 10 car for a part-time Xfinity Series schedule. His schedule was originally a four-race slate beginning in July at Daytona, followed by the road course events at Mid-Ohio, Road America, and the Charlotte Motor Speedway Roval. In the 2019 Circle K Firecracker 250 at Daytona, Allmendinger finished third, but was disqualified and relegated to last place after his car failed an engine vacuum test during post-race inspection.

On July 17, 2019, Kaulig announced that Allmendinger would add a fifth race to his schedule: the 2019 Zippo 200 at The Glen at Watkins Glen International on August 3, 2019. He was once again disqualified when his second-place finishing car was discovered to be too low on both rear corners during post-race inspection.

At his final start of the year at the Charlotte Roval, Allmendinger picked up his first win of the season and third of his Xfinity Series career, beating out RCR driver Tyler Reddick.

A few weeks after his Roval win, Kaulig president Chris Rice stated in an interview that Allmendinger would tentatively return to the team to drive for them in all of the Xfinity Series road course races again. In addition to those four races, he added he could likely run the new race for the series at Martinsville, a track that Allmendinger has historically performed well at throughout his NASCAR career. Allmendinger formally moved to the No. 16, Kaulig's part-time third car, for 2020 because the No. 10 was taken over full-time by Ross Chastain. On January 30, 2020, Kaulig Racing announced Allmendinger would appear in eight races for the team, predominantly at the road courses and superspeedways. Further races at Bristol and Atlanta were later added to his schedule, the latter in which he scored his first career victory on an oval.

The Atlanta victory made Allmendinger eligible for the series' $100,000 Dash 4 Cash bonus available the following week at Homestead-Miami. Kaulig added the race to Allmendinger's schedule, where he finished fourth, enough to claim the bonus.

At the Cup Series race at Martinsville in June, Allmendinger was on standby for RCR's Austin Dillon, who was expecting his first child with his wife, Whitney. Allmendinger continued acting on standby until Homestead-Miami but was not needed as Dillon's son was born Sunday morning before the Homestead race.

In August, Allmendinger finished second at Road America to Team Penske's Austin Cindric. At the Daytona road course race, Allmendinger finished fourth but was involved in controversy as he spun Justin Allgaier in the closing laps, leading to a confrontation between the two drivers. Allmendinger was leading going into the final corner of the August Daytona oval race but wrecked after contact with his Kaulig teammate Ross Chastain.

In October, Allmendinger defended his win on the Charlotte Roval, taking victory at the track for the second year in a row in a race affected by rain and darkness.

=== 2021–2022: Full-time at Kaulig and return to the NASCAR Cup Series ===
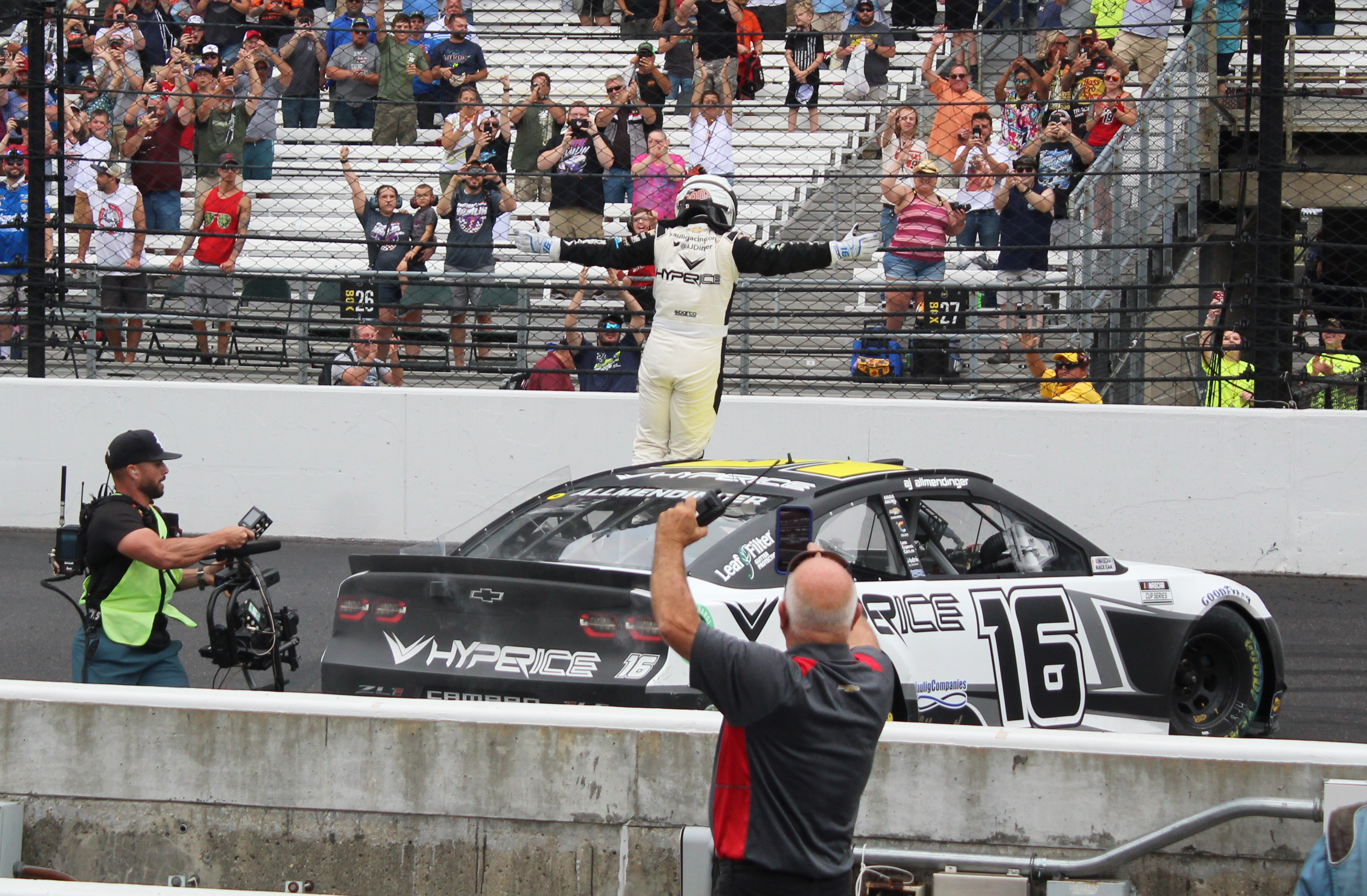
Allmendinger celebrating his win at the 2021 Verizon 200 at the Brickyard

On December 1, 2020, Kaulig announced that Allmendinger would run the full 2021 Xfinity Series schedule for the team. He also joined the team's Cup Series program for the Daytona road course, marking his first Cup series race since 2018. In March, Allmendinger earned his sixth career win by passing Daniel Hemric on a late-race restart at Las Vegas. He scored a second win at Mid-Ohio in June.

On August 5, 2021, GMS Racing announced that Allmendinger would run his first Camping World Truck Series race since 2008 at the regular-season finale at Watkins Glen International, replacing its normal driver Chase Purdy after he tested positive for COVID-19.

On August 15, 2021, Allmendinger scored his second career Cup series win at the Indianapolis road course, giving Kaulig Racing its first victory in the Cup series.

At Bristol, battling with Austin Cindric for the regular-season championship, Allmendinger won the race as well as the regular-season title, despite crashing at the finish similar to Terry Labonte at the 1995 Goody's 500 at Bristol when Labonte was spun by Dale Earnhardt and still won.

After his win at the 2021 Drive for the Cure 250, Allmendinger broke the record for most wins (six) at a road course in NASCAR Xfinity series history. This record was previously held by Austin Cindric. As of March 25, 2023, Allmendinger has won eleven races at a road course in a NASCAR sanctioned event.

In November 2021, it was announced that Allmendinger would be scheduled to run fourteen races for Kaulig Racing during the 2022 NASCAR Cup Series season. However, due to Alex Bowman's concussion-like symptoms and Noah Gragson replacing him, Allmendinger would make the last four races instead of Gragson.

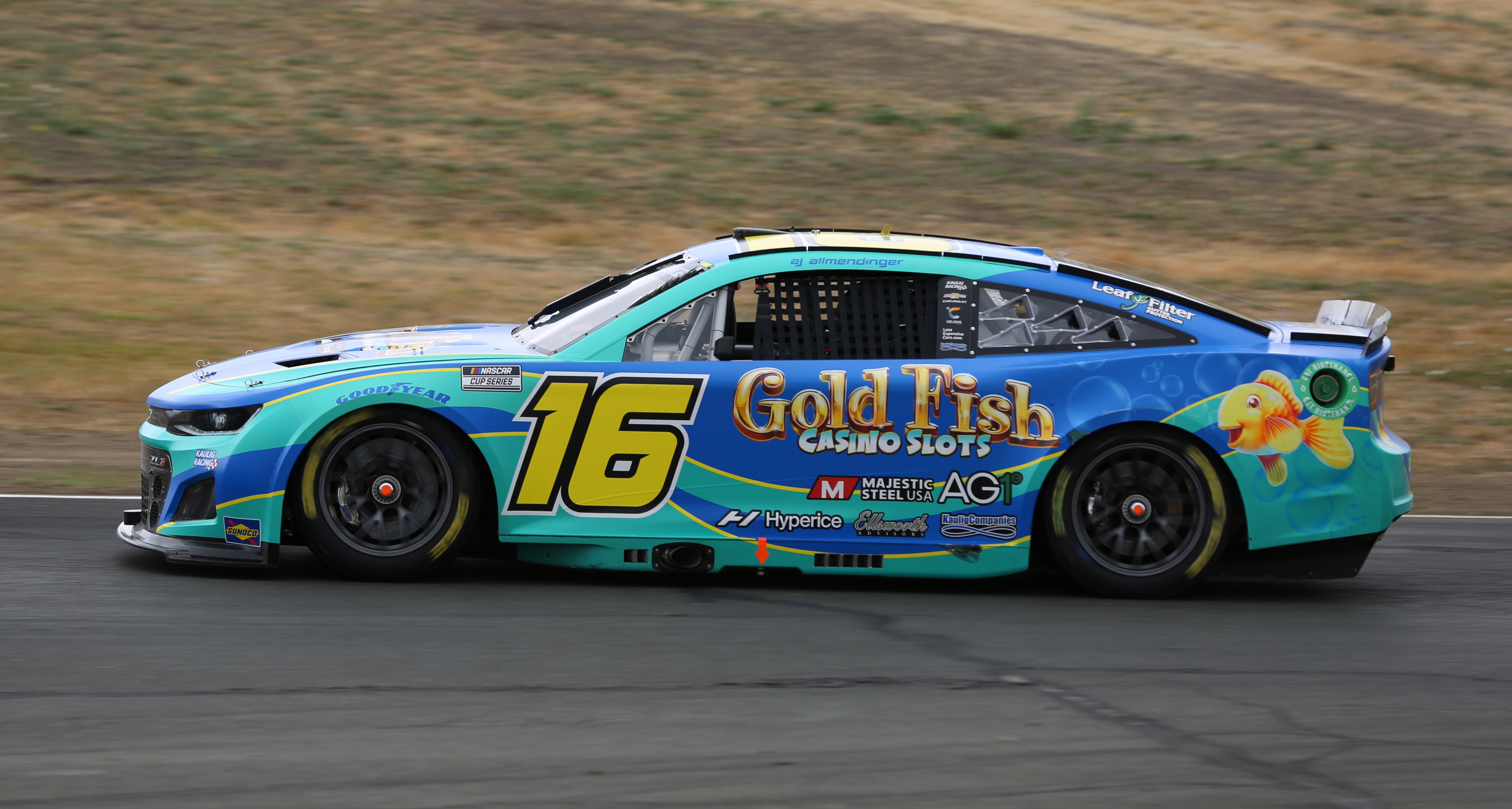
Allmendinger’s No. 16 Cup car at Sonoma Raceway in 2022

Allmendinger started the 2022 Xfinity Series season with a second-place finish at Daytona. He racked up wins at Circuit of the Americas, Portland, and Indianapolis. Following the 2022 Food City 300 at Bristol, Allmendinger clinched the regular season championship. He would win back-to-back races at Talladega and the Charlotte Roval. Allmendinger was unable to advance to the Championship 4, ultimately finishing fifth in the point standings.

=== 2023: Redemption in Cup ===
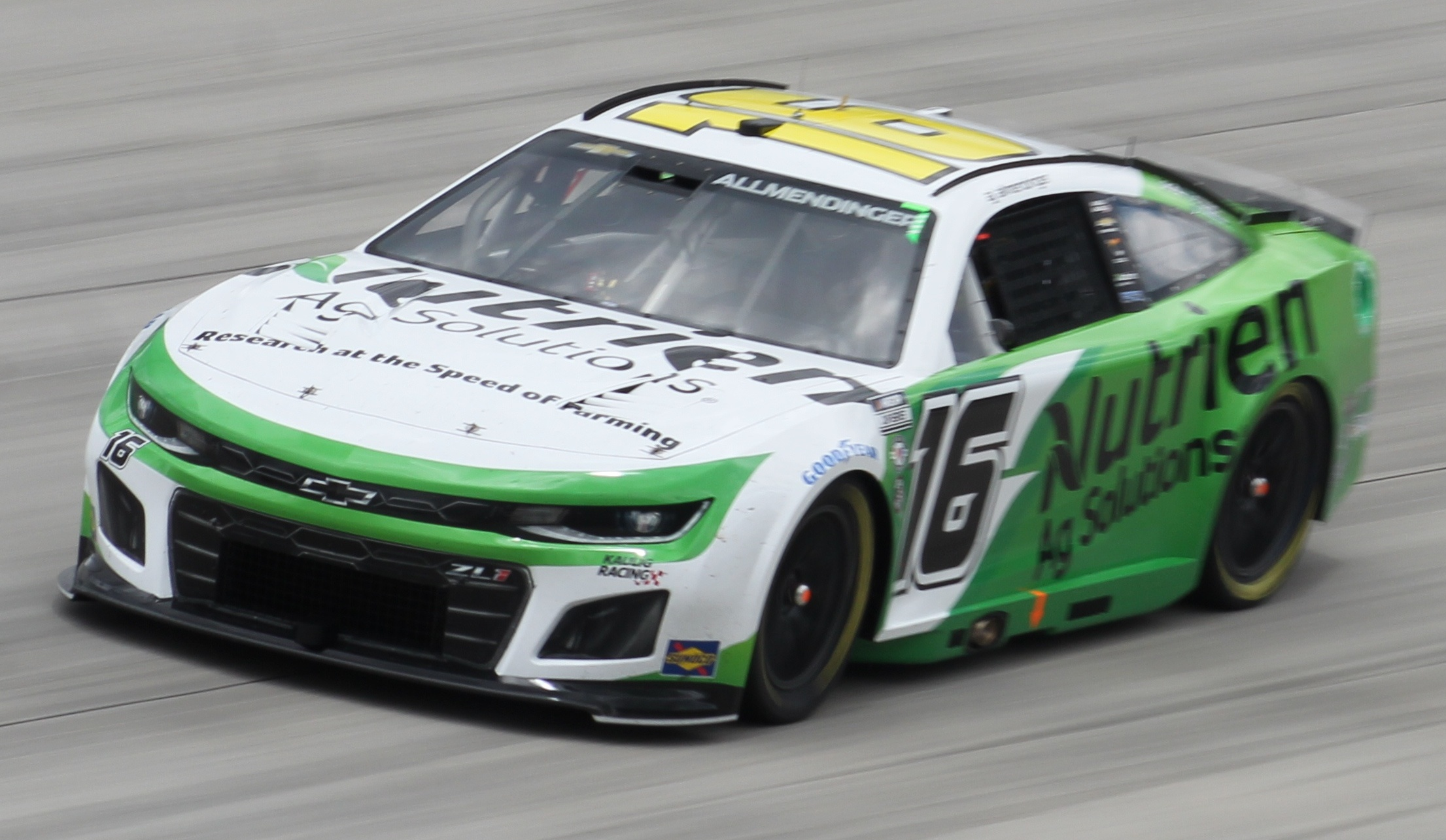
Allmendinger's No. 16 car at Dover Motor Speedway in 2023

On October 5, 2022, Kaulig Racing announced that Allmendinger would drive the No. 16 full-time in 2023, marking his first full-time Cup season since 2018. Despite not making the playoffs, Allmendinger scored a win at the Charlotte Roval. He finished the season 21st in the final points standings.

Allmendinger continued to run in the Xfinity Series on a part-time basis. He scored wins at Circuit of the Americas and Nashville.

=== 2024: Return to the Xfinity Series ===
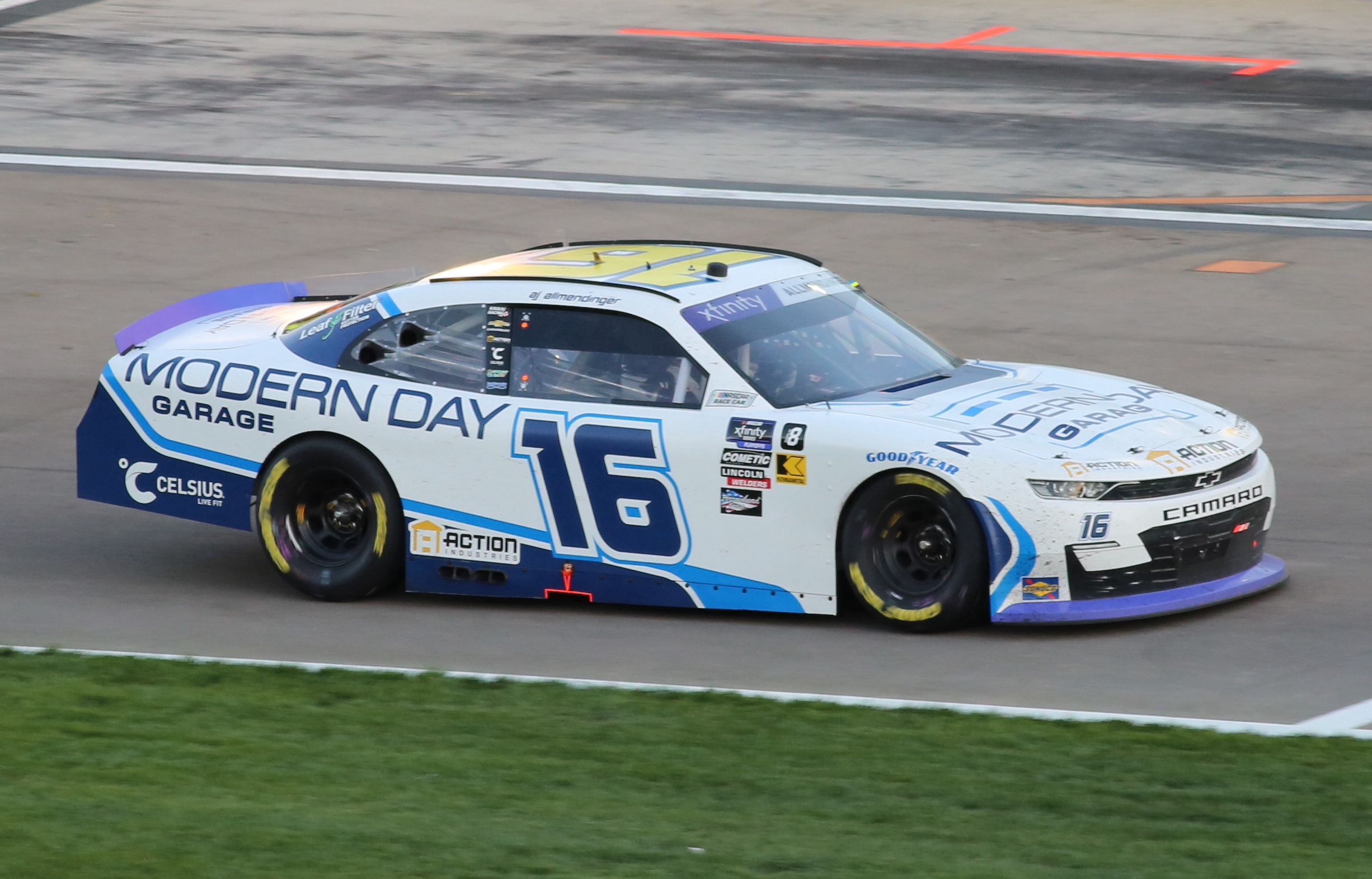
Allmendinger's race-winning car at Las Vegas Motor Speedway in 2024

On December 7, 2023, it was announced that Allmendinger will return to the Xfinity Series full-time in 2024, driving the No. 16 for Kaulig. Despite not winning a race during the regular season, he stayed consistent enough to make the playoffs. During the playoffs, Allmendinger won at Las Vegas to lock himself into the Championship 4. He would go on to finish ninth in the season finale at Phoenix, placing himself third in the final championship standings.

=== 2025: Full-time again in Cup ===
Kaulig announced on August 15, 2024, that Allmendinger would run a full-time Cup Series schedule for the team in 2025, driving the No. 16 car. It would also be the first year since 2017 that he did not make an appearance in the Xfinity Series.

Allmendinger would begin the season with a DNF at the Daytona 500 caused by a blown engine, placing him last in 41st place. After running in the front for most of the race, a vibration caused by a loose right front wheel from the final pit-stop would see him finish 30th at Circuit of the Americas. Allmendinger would recover from these misfortunes with consecutive top-ten finishes at Las Vegas and Homestead. Another top-ten came at Bristol, and Allmendinger was above the playoff cut line in fifteenth position in the points standings at the end of April exiting Talladega.

May brought highs and lows for Allmendinger as further bad luck came in the Würth 400 at Texas, where Allmendinger was involved in a multi-car crash in the final stage. A second engine failure of the season at the next race at Kansas after just six laps dropped him to 25th in the standings. He found redemption at the Coca-Cola 600, where Allmendinger was able to grab his first top-five finish of the year, finishing fourth and bringing him up to seventeenth in the points, just outside the cut line.

In June, Allmendinger continued to hover around the cut line. At Nashville, he started from the back due to a penalty for unapproved adjustments after qualifying and finished in twentieth. In Mexico, he qualified eighth but was involved in a crash early in the race. Allmendinger was able to drive his damaged car back up the field to finish thirteenth. His best finish of June came at the end of the month in Atlanta, where he finished in twelfth after recovering from another early race wreck, leaving him seventeenth in the points standings and 59 points below the cut line.

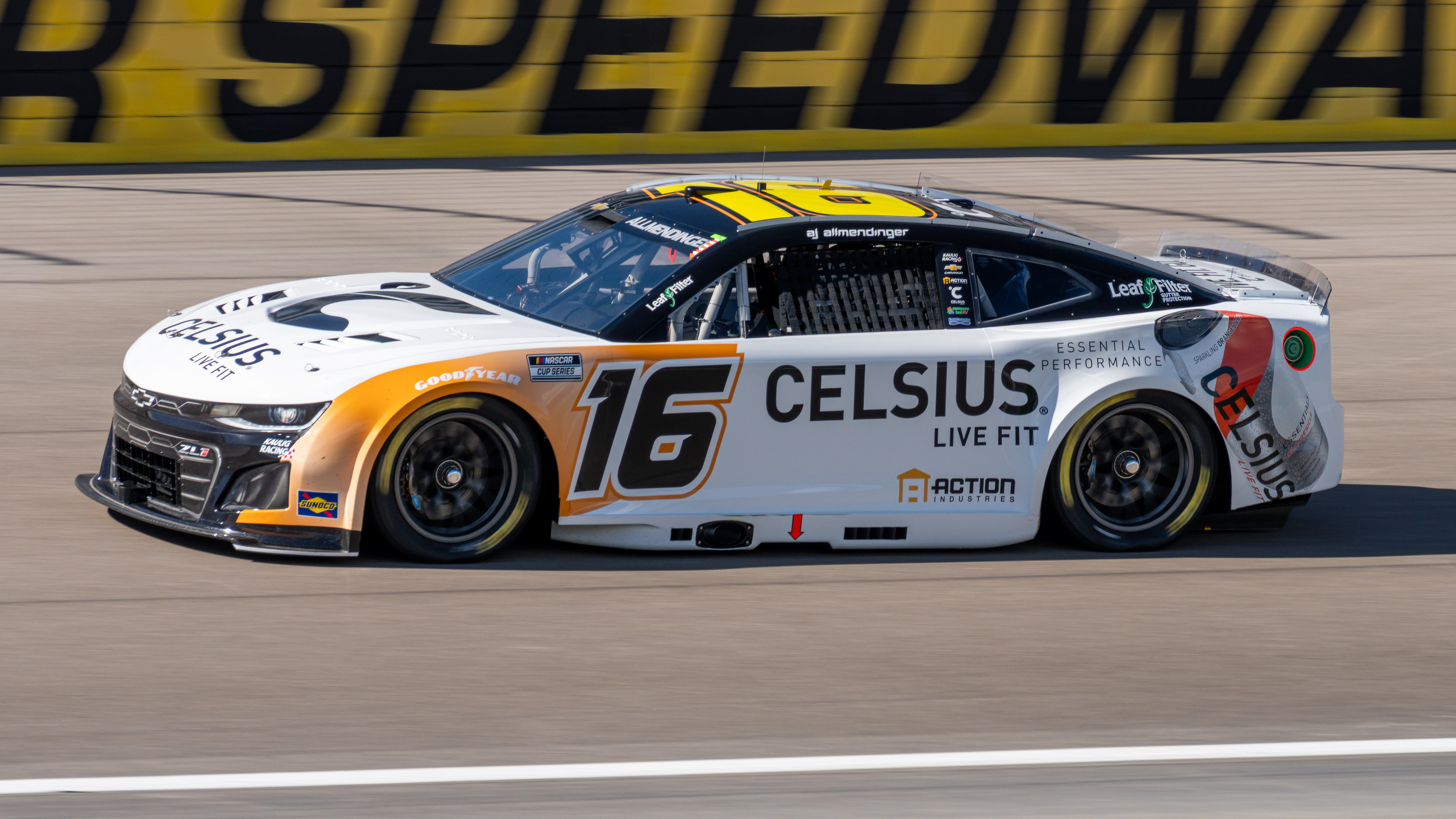
Allmendinger's No. 16 car during practice for the 2025 South Point 400

Allmendinger would start July with a fifth top-ten on the streets of Chicago by finishing in sixth, but the remainder of the regular season would prove to be disappointing. At the next race in Sonoma, he was fastest in practice and qualified fifth but finished down the field in eighteenth after a spin in stage 2. In Dover he again suffered a mechanical issue causing him to finish last, this time due to rear brake failure. His best result between Chicago and the regular season finale at Daytona was an eleventh-place finish at Watkins Glen. Allmendinger would fail to make the playoffs, ending 21st in points after Daytona.

Despite not making the playoffs, Allmendinger would notch his second top-five at the playoff opening Southern 500. Another bright spot would come two races later at Bristol where he qualified on pole, the first time he had done so since 2015. Unfortunately, he was forced to retire from the race due to crash damage and finished in 36th. A final top-ten of the season came at the Charlotte Roval, but he would end up retiring early in four out of the final eight races of the season due to accidents. He ended the season 26th in points with two top-fives, seven top-tens, and a pole.

=== 2026: Return to Truck Series ===
Allmendinger would begin the 2026 season with a 19th-place finish in the Daytona 500. He would score his first top 10 of the season at Austin. At Sonoma, Allmendinger had his 500th career start.

On March 18, it was announced Allmendinger would return to the Craftsman Truck Series at Darlington, driving the No. 10 Ram 1500 after the original driver, Daniel Dye, would be suspended by NASCAR and Kaulig Racing after using a homophobic slur the day prior. This would be Allmendinger's first Truck Series start since 2021 at Watkins Glen, and his first oval start in the series since 2008 at Fontana. He finished eleventh in the race. Allmendinger was announced in the No. 25 at Watkins Glen. He finished inside the top-ten, earning a sixth-place finish.

== Sports car racing ==
From 2006 to 2021, with the exception of 2017, Allmendinger has competed in the 24 Hours of Daytona.

On January 28–29, 2012, Allmendinger entered the Rolex 24 driving for Michael Shank Racing and drove the final segment of the 24-hour race to the victory for the team in the Daytona Prototype Division. His teammates were Justin Wilson, John Pew, and Oswaldo Negri. To do so, he had to fend off sports car racing veteran Allan McNish, among others.

On January 4, 2014, it was announced that Allmendinger would return to Michael Shank Racing for the 24 Hours of Daytona. Co-driving with John Pew, Oswaldo Negri Jr. and Justin Wilson, the team finished 47th overall, a twelfth in the Prototype class.

== Television career ==
Allmendinger first ventured into television with Fox Sports' NASCAR Race Hub, serving as a recurring driver analyst while still racing full-time for JTG Daugherty Racing. On December 19, 2018, NBC Sports announced plans to hire Allmendinger as an analyst for their IMSA Sports Car coverage. He would also be a contributor to NBCSN's NASCAR America.

Additionally, Allmendinger joined NBCSN's coverage of American Flat Track as an analyst for the 2019 season. In July 2019, Allmendinger joined the IndyCar Series on NBC booth for the Iowa Speedway event, working alongside Leigh Diffey and Paul Tracy.

In 2025, Allmendinger joined the NASCAR on The CW crew as a guest analyst at the 2025 The Loop 110. The following year, he joined the crew for the 2026 Pit Boss/FoodMaxx 250.

== Personal life ==
Allmendinger was born in Santa Clara but raised in Los Gatos, both suburbs of the San Francisco Bay area.

Allmendinger was married to Canadian model and 2003 Miss Molson Indy Canada Lynne Kushnirenko in January 2007 after meeting her at a Champ Car race in Toronto in 2005. The two filed for divorce in 2012.

In 2019, Allmendinger married longtime girlfriend Tara Meador. The two owned a pet cat named Mr. Tickles, whom they enjoyed dearly.

Allmendinger was very close friends with his former RuSPORT and Rolex 24 teammate Justin Wilson. After Wilson's death in 2015, former RuSPORT president Jeremy Dale recalled their positive relationship as teammates as something that helped Allmendinger's growth as a driver. Allmendinger honored Wilson throughout the final races of the 2015 Cup Series season by placing Wilson's name above the window of his car. He also stated after Wilson's death that he would only return to IndyCar racing if the series implemented cockpit protection.

== Motorsports career results ==
=== Racing career summary ===
Season	Series	Team	Races	Wins	Top 5	Top 10	Points	Position
2001	Barber Dodge Pro Series	N/A	3	0	0	2	19	18th
2002	Barber Dodge Pro Series	N/A	10	6	10	10	189	**1st**
2003	Toyota Atlantic Championship	RuSPORT	12	7	9	10	201	**1st**
2004	Champ Car World Series	RuSPORT	14	0	5	9	229	6th
2005	Champ Car World Series	RuSPORT	13	0	6	9	227	5th
2006	Champ Car World Series	RuSPORT	4	0	2	3	285	**3rd**
2006	Champ Car World Series	Forsythe Championship Racing	9	5	6	7	285	**3rd**
2006	NASCAR Craftsman Truck Series	Bill Davis Racing	3	0	1	1	350	46th
2006	Rolex Sports Car Series - DP	Michael Shank Racing	1	0	1	1	32	88
2006	24 Hours of Daytona	Michael Shank Racing	1	0	1	1	N/A	**2nd**
2007	NASCAR Craftsman Truck Series	Darrell Waltrip Motorsports	8	0	1	2	916	34th
2007	NASCAR Busch Series	Chip Ganassi Racing	7	0	0	0	678	59th
2007	NASCAR Nextel Cup Series	Team Red Bull	16	0	0	0	1165	43rd
2007	Rolex Sports Car Series - DP	Michael Shank Racing	1	0	0	0	15	101st
2007	24 Hours of Daytona	Michael Shank Racing	1	0	0	0	N/A	16th
2008	NASCAR Craftsman Truck Series	Morgan-Dollar Motorsports	1	0	0	0	0	115th
2008	NASCAR Nationwide Series	Gillett Everham Motorsports	1	0	0	0	132	109th
2008	NASCAR Sprint Cup Series	Gillett Everham Motorsports	5	0	0	0	2436	36th
2008	NASCAR Sprint Cup Series	Michael Waltrip Racing	1	0	0	0	2436	36th
2008	NASCAR Sprint Cup Series	Team Red Bull	21	0	0	2	2436	36th
2008	Rolex Sports Car Series - DP	Michael Shank Racing	1	0	0	1	22	66th
2008	24 Hours of Daytona	Michael Shank Racing	1	0	0	1	N/A	9th
2009	NASCAR Sprint Cup Series	Richard Petty Motorsports	36	0	1	6	3476	24th
2009	Rolex Sports Car Series - DP	Michael Shank Racing	1	0	0	0	12	80th
2009	24 Hours of Daytona	Michael Shank Racing	1	0	0	0	N/A	19th
2010	NASCAR Sprint Cup Series	Richard Petty Motorsports	36	0	2	8	3998	19th
2010	Rolex Sports Car Series - DP	Michael Shank Racing	1	0	0	0	24	45th
2010	24 Hours of Daytona	Michael Shank Racing	1	0	0	0	N/A	7th
2011	NASCAR Sprint Cup Series	Richard Petty Motorsports	36	0	1	10	1013	15th
2011	Rolex Sports Car Series - DP	Michael Shank Racing	1	0	0	1	24	46th
2011	24 Hours of Daytona	Michael Shank Racing	1	0	0	1	N/A	7th
2012	NASCAR Sprint Cup Series	Penske Racing	17	0	1	3	417	33rd
2012	NASCAR Sprint Cup Series	Phoenix Racing	4	0	0	0	417	33rd
2012	Rolex Sports Car Series - DP	Michael Shank Racing	1	1	1	1	35	33rd
2012	24 Hours of Daytona	Michael Shank Racing	1	1	1	1	N/A	**1st**
2013	NASCAR Nationwide Series	Penske Racing	2	2	2	2	0	NC†
2013	NASCAR Sprint Cup Series	Phoenix Racing	9	0	0	0	410	35th
2013	NASCAR Sprint Cup Series	JTG Daugherty Racing	9	0	0	1	410	35th
2013	IndyCar Series	Team Penske	6	0	0	1	79	27th
2013	Rolex Sports Car Series - DP	Michael Shank Racing	2	0	1	2	21	60th
2013	24 Hours of Daytona	Michael Shank Racing	1	0	1	1	N/A	**3rd**
2014	NASCAR Sprint Cup Series	JTG Daugherty Racing	36	1	2	5	2260	13th
2014	United SportsCar Championship - P	Michael Shank Racing	1	0	0	0	20	50th
2014	24 Hours of Daytona	Michael Shank Racing	1	0	0	0	N/A	12th
2015	NASCAR Sprint Cup Series	JTG Daugherty Racing	36	0	0	3	758	22nd
2015	United SportsCar Championship - P	Michael Shank Racing	1	0	1	1	27	26th
2015	24 Hours of Daytona	Michael Shank Racing	1	0	1	1	N/A	5th
2016	NASCAR Sprint Cup Series	JTG Daugherty Racing	36	0	2	9	830	19th
2016	IMSA SportsCar Championship - P	Michael Shank Racing	1	0	0	0	21	34th
2016	24 Hours of Daytona	Michael Shank Racing	1	0	0	0	N/A	11th
2017	Monster Energy NASCAR Cup Series	JTG Daugherty Racing	36	0	1	5	531	27th
2018	NASCAR Xfinity Series	GMS Racing	1	0	1	1	0	NC†
2018	Monster Energy NASCAR Cup Series	JTG Daugherty Racing	36	0	1	5	603	22nd
2018	IMSA SportsCar Championship - GTD	Michael Shank Racing	1	0	1	1	32	47th
2018	24 Hours of Daytona	Michael Shank Racing	1	0	1	1	N/A	**2nd**
2019	NASCAR Xfinity Series	Kaulig Racing	5	1	2	2	105	39th
2019	IMSA SportsCar Championship - GTD	Michael Shank Racing	1	0	1	1	28	48th
2019	24 Hours of Daytona	Michael Shank Racing	1	0	1	1	N/A	5th
2020	NASCAR Xfinity Series	Kaulig Racing	11	2	6	8	366	24th
2020	IMSA SportsCar Championship - GTD	Heinricher Racing with Michael Shank Racing	1	0	0	1	23	47th
2020	24 Hours of Daytona	Heinricher Racing with Michael Shank Racing	1	0	0	1	N/A	8th
2021	NASCAR Xfinity Series	Kaulig Racing	33	5	18	22	4023	4th
2021	NASCAR Cup Series	Kaulig Racing	5	1	2	3	0	NC†
2021	IMSA SportsCar Championship - DPi	Meyer Shank Racing	1	0	1	1	308	18th
2021	24 Hours of Daytona	Meyer Shank Racing	1	0	1	1	N/A	4th
2021	NASCAR Camping World Truck Series	GMS Racing	1	0	0	0	0	NC†
2022	NASCAR Xfinity Series	Kaulig Racing	33	5	17	28	2333	5th
2022	NASCAR Cup Series	Kaulig Racing	18	0	3	8	0	NC†
2023	NASCAR Xfinity Series	Kaulig Racing	5	2	4	5	0	NC†
2023	NASCAR Cup Series	Kaulig Racing	36	1	4	7	692	21st
2024	NASCAR Xfinity Series	Kaulig Racing	33	1	7	18	4028	**3rd**
2024	NASCAR Cup Series	Kaulig Racing	16	0	0	5	0	NC†
2025	NASCAR Cup Series	Kaulig Racing	36	0	2	7	649	26th
2026	NASCAR Craftsman Truck Series	Kaulig Racing	2	0	0	1	0	NC†
2026	NASCAR Cup Series	Kaulig Racing	28	0	1	4	499*	23rd*
2026	IMSA SportsCar Championship - GTP	Acura Meyer Shank Racing	1	0	0	1	248	31st
2026	24 Hours of Daytona	Acura Meyer Shank Racing	1	0	0	1	N/A	9th

^{†} As Allmendinger was a guest driver, he was ineligible for championship points.

=== American open-wheel racing ===
(key)

==== Barber Dodge Pro Series ====
Barber Dodge Pro Series results
Year	1	2	3	4	5	6	7	8	9	10	11	12	Rank	Points	Ref
2001	SEB	PIR	LRP1	LRP2	DET	CLE	TOR	CHI	MOH; 22	ROA; 7	VAN; 6	LAG	18th	19	
2002	**SEB**; 1	**LRP**; 1	LAG; 3	POR; 1	TOR; 1	CLE; 4	**VAN**; 1	MOH; 3	ROA; 2	**MTL**; 1			1st	189	

==== Atlantic Championship ====
Toyota Atlantic results
Year	Team	1	2	3	4	5	6	7	8	9	10	11	12	Rank	Points	Ref
2003	RuSPORT	MTY; 8	**LBH**; 1	MIL; 3	**LS**; 1	POR; 4	**CLE**; 1	**TOR**; 1	**TRR**; 1	**MOH**; Ret	**MTL**; 1	**DEN**; 1	**MIA**; 11	1st	201	

==== Champ Car World Series ====
Champ Car World Series results
Year	Team	No.	Chassis	Engine	1	2	3	4	5	6	7	8	9	10	11	12	13	14	Rank	Points	Ref
2004	RuSPORT	10	Lola	Ford	LBH; 12	MTY; 17	MIL; 5	POR; 6	CLE; 6	TOR; 11	VAN; 3	ROA; 13	DEN; 5	MTL; 5	LS; 15	LVG; 6	SRF; 6	MXC; 3	6th	229	
2005	RuSPORT	10	Lola	Ford	LBH; 8	MTY; 10	MIL; 2	POR; 5	CLE; 2	TOR; 12	**EDM**; 14	SJO; 17	DEN; 3	MTL; 9	LVG; 13	SRF; 2	MXC; 2		5th	227	
2006	RuSPORT	10	Lola	Ford	LBH; 16	HOU; 8	MTY; 3	MIL; 4											3rd	285	
2006	Forsythe Championship Racing	7	Lola	Ford					POR; 1	**CLE**; 1	TOR; 1	EDM; 3	SJO; 7	DEN; 1	MTL; 17	ROA; 1	SRF; 16	MXC	3rd	285	

==== IndyCar Series ====
IndyCar Series results
Year	Team	No.	Chassis	Engine	1	2	3	4	5	6	7	8	9	10	11	12	13	14	15	16	17	18	19	Rank	Points	Ref
2013	Team Penske	2	Dallara DW12	Chevrolet	STP	ALA; 19	LBH; 23	SAO	INDY; 7	DET; 25	DET; 25	TXS	MIL	IOW	POC	TOR	TOR	MOH	SNM	BAL	HOU	HOU	FON; 16	27th	79	

==== Indianapolis 500 ====
Year	Chassis	Engine	Start	Finish	Team
2013	Dallara	Chevrolet	5	7	Team Penske

=== NASCAR ===
(key) (Bold – Pole position awarded by qualifying time. Italics – Pole position earned by points standings or practice time. * – Most laps led.)

==== Cup Series ====
NASCAR Cup Series results
Year	Team	No.	Make	1	2	3	4	5	6	7	8	9	10	11	12	13	14	15	16	17	18	19	20	21	22	23	24	25	26	27	28	29	30	31	32	33	34	35	36	NCSC	Pts	Ref
2006	Team Red Bull	84	Dodge	DAY	CAL	LVS	ATL	BRI	MAR	TEX	PHO	TAL	RCH	DAR	CLT	DOV	POC	MCH	SON	DAY	CHI	NHA	POC	IND	GLN	MCH	BRI	CAL	RCH	NHA	DOV	KAN	TAL	CLT	MAR	ATL; DNQ	TEX; DNQ	PHO	HOM	N/A	-	
2007	Team Red Bull	84	Toyota	DAY; DNQ	CAL; DNQ	LVS; DNQ	ATL; DNQ	BRI; 40	MAR; 38	TEX; DNQ	PHO; DNQ	TAL; DNQ	RCH; 32	DAR; 36	CLT; 31	DOV; 33	POC; 39	MCH; 31	SON; DNQ	NHA; DNQ	DAY; DNQ	CHI; DNQ	IND; DNQ	POC; DNQ	GLN; DNQ	MCH; DNQ	BRI; 35	CAL; 18	RCH; 23	NHA; 33	DOV; 43	KAN; DNQ	TAL; DNQ	CLT; 15	MAR; 35	ATL; 16	TEX; 39	PHO; DNQ	HOM; DNQ	43rd	1165	
2008	Team Red Bull	84	Toyota	DAY; DNQ	CAL; DNQ	LVS; DNQ	ATL	BRI	MAR	TEX	PHO	TAL; 30	RCH; 39	DAR; 27	CLT; 20	DOV; 37	POC; 12	MCH; 19	SON; 37	NHA; 43	DAY; 42	CHI; 13	IND; 10	POC; 19	GLN; 11	MCH; 28	BRI; 34	CAL; 14	RCH; 43	NHA; 38	DOV; 16	KAN; 9	TAL							36th	2436	
2008	Michael Waltrip Racing	00	Toyota																															CLT; 43						36th	2436	
2008	Gillett Evernham Motorsports	10	Dodge																																MAR; 15	ATL; 14	TEX; 26	PHO; 16	HOM; 11	36th	2436	
2009	Richard Petty Motorsports	44	Dodge	DAY; 3	CAL; 29	LVS; 33	ATL; 17	BRI; 16	MAR; 9	TEX; 34	PHO; 35	TAL; 35	RCH; 21	DAR; 17	CLT; 32	DOV; 29	POC; 30	MCH; 39	SON; 7	NHA; 32	DAY; 17	CHI; 13	IND; 20	POC; 17	GLN; 13	MCH; 22	BRI; 37	ATL; 20	RCH; 23	NHA; 25	DOV; 7	KAN; 17	CAL; 33	CLT; 23	MAR; 34	TAL; 33				24th	3476	
2009	Richard Petty Motorsports	44	Ford																																		TEX; 10	PHO; 13	HOM; 10	24th	3476	
2010	Richard Petty Motorsports	43	Ford	DAY; 32	CAL; 25	LVS; 25	ATL; 6	BRI; 17	MAR; 38	**PHO**; 15	TEX; 13	TAL; 19	RCH; 17	DAR; 37	DOV; 14	CLT; 14	POC; 10	MCH; 11	SON; 13	NHA; 10	DAY; 36	CHI; 14	IND; 16	POC; 24	GLN; 4	MCH; 17	BRI; 31	ATL; 18	RCH; 8	NHA; 12	DOV; 10	KAN; 10	CAL; 19	CLT; 25	MAR; 12	TAL; 32	TEX; 14	PHO; 18	HOM; 5	19th	3998	
2011	Richard Petty Motorsports	43	Ford	DAY; 11	PHO; 9	LVS; 19	BRI; 31	CAL; 14	MAR; 14	TEX; 19	TAL; 11	RCH; 7	DAR; 20	DOV; 37	CLT; 5	KAN; 27	POC; 25	MCH; 13	SON; 13	DAY; 10	KEN; 28	NHA; 12	IND; 22	POC; 19	GLN; 8	MCH; 11	BRI; 12	ATL; 10	RCH; 11	CHI; 27	NHA; 21	DOV; 7	KAN; 25	CLT; 7	TAL; 31	MAR; 11	TEX; 10	PHO; 6	HOM; 15	15th	1013	
2012	Penske Racing	22	Dodge	DAY; 34	PHO; 18	LVS; 37	BRI; 17	CAL; 15	MAR; 2	TEX; 15	**KAN**; 32	RCH; 16	TAL; 15	DAR; 33	CLT; 33	DOV; 16	POC; 31	MCH; 19	SON; 9	KEN; 9	DAY; QL^{†}	NHA	IND	POC	GLN	MCH	BRI	ATL	RCH	CHI	NHA	DOV	TAL							33rd	417	
2012	Phoenix Racing	51	Chevy																															CLT; 24	KAN; 35	MAR; 28	TEX; 36	PHO	HOM	33rd	417	
2013	Phoenix Racing	51	Chevy	DAY	PHO; 11	LVS	BRI; 13	CAL; 16	MAR	TEX	KAN	RCH; 14	TAL	DAR	CLT	DOV	POC; 33				DAY; 35	NHA; 22	IND; 22	POC; 33																35th	410	
2013	JTG Daugherty Racing	47	Toyota															MCH; 19	SON	KEN; 22					GLN; 10	MCH	BRI	ATL; 14	RCH; 15	CHI; 21	NHA	DOV; 26	KAN; 20	CLT	TAL	MAR	TEX	PHO	HOM; 36	35th	410	
2014	JTG Daugherty Racing	47	Chevy	DAY; 26	PHO; 26	LVS; 18	BRI; 25	CAL; 8	MAR; 11	TEX; 23	DAR; 15	RCH; 6	TAL; 5	KAN; 30	CLT; 23	DOV; 21	POC; 21	MCH; 22	SON; 37*	KEN; 22	DAY; 43	NHA; 18	IND; 18	POC; 34	GLN; 1*	MCH; 13	BRI; 14	ATL; 40	RCH; 23	CHI; 22	NHA; 13	DOV; 23	KAN; 11	CLT; 12	TAL; 23	MAR; 9	TEX; 14	PHO; 16	HOM; 40	13th	2260	
2015	JTG Daugherty Racing	47	Chevy	DAY; 20	ATL; 7	LVS; 6	PHO; 17	CAL; 34	MAR; 43	TEX; 21	BRI; 34	RCH; 13	TAL; 17	KAN; 14	CLT; 29	DOV; 24	POC; 38	MCH; 23	**SON**; 37	DAY; 21	KEN; 26	NHA; 13	IND; 23	POC; 7	**GLN**; 24	MCH; 28	BRI; 27	DAR; 23	RCH; 24	CHI; 36	NHA; 23	DOV; 29	CLT; 16	KAN; 27	TAL; 36	MAR; 11	TEX; 17	PHO; 24	HOM; 20	22nd	758	
2016	JTG Daugherty Racing	47	Chevy	DAY; 21	ATL; 27	LVS; 14	PHO; 17	CAL; 8	MAR; 2	TEX; 22	BRI; 19	RCH; 25	TAL; 14	KAN; 8	DOV; 23	CLT; 16	POC; 16	MCH; 38	SON; 14	DAY; 13	KEN; 36	NHA; 21	IND; 38	POC; 14	GLN; 4	BRI; 9	MCH; 15	DAR; 23	RCH; 20	CHI; 17	NHA; 21	DOV; 19	CLT; 37	KAN; 8	TAL; 10	MAR; 10	TEX; 17	PHO; 17	HOM; 8	19th	830	
2017	JTG Daugherty Racing	47	Chevy	DAY; 3	ATL; 26	LVS; 24	PHO; 26	CAL; 17	MAR; 6	TEX; 20	BRI; 30	RCH; 37	TAL; 31	KAN; 30	CLT; 18	DOV; 18	POC; 22	MCH; 18	SON; 35	DAY; 8	KEN; 20	NHA; 21	IND; 10	POC; 23	GLN; 9	MCH; 20	BRI; 22	DAR; 34	RCH; 26	CHI; 26	NHA; 17	DOV; 28	CLT; 20	TAL; 22	KAN; 32	MAR; 40	TEX; 16	PHO; 23	HOM; 14	27th	531	
2018	JTG Daugherty Racing	47	Chevy	DAY; 10	ATL; 29	LVS; 30	PHO; 21	CAL; 22	MAR; 8	TEX; 24	BRI; 17	RCH; 27	TAL; 34	DOV; 21	KAN; 16	CLT; 23	POC; 22	MCH; 17	SON; 38	CHI; 24	DAY; 3	KEN; 30	NHA; 36	POC; 14	GLN; 15	MCH; 22	BRI; 39	DAR; 22	IND; 37	LVS; 14	RCH; 29	ROV; 7	DOV; 22	TAL; 6	KAN; 21	MAR; 14	TEX; 20	PHO; 12	HOM; 19	22nd	603	
2021	Kaulig Racing	16	Chevy	DAY	DRC; 7	HOM	LVS	PHO	ATL	BRD	MAR	RCH	TAL	KAN	DAR	DOV	COA; 5	CLT	SON	NSH	POC	POC	ROA; 29	ATL	NHA	GLN	IRC; 1	MCH	DAY	DAR	RCH	BRI	LVS	TAL	ROV; 38	TEX	KAN	MAR	PHO	43rd	0^{1}	
2022	Kaulig Racing	16	Chevy	DAY	CAL	LVS	PHO; 20	ATL	COA; 33	RCH; 27	MAR; 24	BRD	TAL	DOV; 33	DAR	KAN	CLT	GTW; 10	SON; 19	NSH; 19	ROA; 9	ATL	NHA; 16	POC	IRC; 7	MCH	RCH	GLN; 2	DAY	DAR	KAN	BRI; 7	TEX	TAL	ROV; 4	LVS; 9	HOM; 3	MAR; 23	PHO; 12	42nd	0^{1}	
2023	Kaulig Racing	16	Chevy	DAY; 6	CAL; 36	LVS; 18	PHO; 20	ATL; 16	COA; 34	RCH; 27	BRD; 16	MAR; 27	TAL; 29	DOV; 18	KAN; 14	DAR; 23	CLT; 14	GTW; 14	SON; 6	NSH; 10	CSC; 17	ATL; 3	NHA; 19	POC; 17	RCH; 27	MCH; 26	IRC; 26	GLN; 4	DAY; 29	DAR; 13	KAN; 30	BRI; 30	TEX; 29	TAL; 20	ROV; 1*	LVS; 21	HOM; 5	MAR; 28	PHO; 32	21st	692	
2024	Kaulig Racing	16	Chevy	DAY; 6	ATL	LVS	PHO	BRI; 23						DOV; 13	KAN	DAR	CLT	GTW	SON; 6	IOW; 36	NHA	NSH; 11		POC; 21	IND; 37	RCH	MCH; 30	DAY	DAR	ATL		BRI; 23	KAN		ROV; 6	LVS	HOM; 8	MAR	PHO	46th	0^{1}	
2024	Kaulig Racing	13	Chevy						COA; 6	RCH	MAR	TEX	TAL										CSC; 38								GLN; 36			TAL; 28						46th	0^{1}	
2025	Kaulig Racing	16	Chevy	DAY; 41	ATL; 14	COA; 30	PHO; 22	LVS; 8	HOM; 7	MAR; 23	DAR; 18	BRI; 9	TAL; 24	TEX; 36	KAN; 38	CLT; 4	NSH; 20	MCH; 17	MXC; 13	POC; 21	ATL; 12	CSC; 6	SON; 18	DOV; 37	IND; 23	IOW; 18	GLN; 11	RCH; 22	DAY; 26	DAR; 5	GTW; 23	**BRI**; 36	NHA; 20	KAN; 36	ROV; 9	LVS; 19	TAL; 37	MAR; 28	PHO; 38	26th	649	
2026	Kaulig Racing	16	Chevy	DAY; 19	ATL; 12	COA; 9	PHO; 19	LVS; 24	DAR; 30	MAR; 27	BRI; 15	KAN; 31	TAL; 16	TEX; 25	GLN; 7	CLT; 18	NSH; 35	MCH; 17	POC; 22	COR; 5	SON; 16	CHI; 17	ATL; 37	NWS; 37	IND; 25	IOW; 8	RCH; 33	NHA; 23	DAY; 30	DAR; 22	GTW; 16	BRI; 22	KAN; 22	LVS; 15	CLT; 28	PHO; 23	TAL; 31	MAR; 25	HOM; 23	25th	606	
2027	Kaulig Racing	16	Dodge	DAY	ATL	COA	PHO	LVS	DAR	BRI	MAR	TAL	TEX	KAN	DOV	CLT	NSS	POC	MCH	CHI	IOW	SON	ATL	IND	COR	BRI	GTW	DAY	DAR	RCH	GLN	NHA	KAN	LVS	CLT	PHO	TAL	MAR	HOM			
^{†} – Qualified but replaced by Sam Hornish Jr.

===== Daytona 500 =====
Year	Team	Manufacturer	Start	Finish
2007	Team Red Bull	Toyota	DNQ	
2008	Team Red Bull	Toyota	DNQ	
2009	Richard Petty Motorsports	Dodge	20	3
2010	Richard Petty Motorsports	Ford	15	32
2011	Richard Petty Motorsports	Ford	15	11
2012	Penske Racing	Dodge	15	34
2014	JTG Daugherty Racing	Chevrolet	15	26
2015	JTG Daugherty Racing	Chevrolet	40	20
2016	JTG Daugherty Racing	Chevrolet	30	21
2017	JTG Daugherty Racing	Chevrolet	38	3
2018	JTG Daugherty Racing	Chevrolet	20	10
2023	Kaulig Racing	Chevrolet	29	6
2024	Kaulig Racing	Chevrolet	28	6
2025	Kaulig Racing	Chevrolet	13	41
2026	Kaulig Racing	Chevrolet	35	19
2027	Kaulig Racing	Dodge		

==== Xfinity Series ====
NASCAR Xfinity Series results
Year	Team	No.	Make	1	2	3	4	5	6	7	8	9	10	11	12	13	14	15	16	17	18	19	20	21	22	23	24	25	26	27	28	29	30	31	32	33	34	35	NXSC	Pts	Ref
2007	Chip Ganassi Racing	42	Dodge	DAY	CAL	MXC	LVS	ATL	BRI	NSH	TEX	PHO	TAL	RCH	DAR	CLT	DOV	NSH	KEN	MLW	NHA	DAY	CHI	GTW	IRP	CGV	GLN	MCH	BRI	CAL; 36	RCH; 14	DOV; 21	KAN; 25	CLT; 26	MEM	TEX			59th	678	
2007	Chip Ganassi Racing	41	Dodge																																		PHO; 13	HOM; 21	59th	678	
2008	Gillett Evernham Motorsports	9	Dodge	DAY	CAL	LVS	ATL	BRI	NSH	TEX	PHO	MXC	TAL	RCH	DAR	CLT	DOV	NSH	KEN	MLW	NHA	DAY	CHI	GTW	IRP	CGV	GLN	MCH	BRI	CAL	RCH	DOV	KAN	CLT	MEM	TEX	PHO; 12	HOM	109th	132	
2013	Penske Racing	22	Ford	DAY	PHO	LVS	BRI	CAL	TEX	RCH	TAL	DAR	CLT	DOV	IOW	MCH	**ROA**; 1*	KEN	DAY	NHA	CHI	IND	IOW	GLN	MOH; 1*	BRI	ATL	RCH	CHI	KEN	DOV	KAN	CLT	TEX	PHO	HOM			93rd	0^{1}	
2018	GMS Racing	23	Chevy	DAY	ATL	LVS	PHO	CAL	TEX	BRI	RCH	TAL	DOV	CLT	POC	MCH	IOW	CHI	DAY	KEN	NHA	IOW	GLN; 2	MOH	BRI	ROA	DAR	IND	LVS	RCH	ROV	DOV	KAN	TEX	PHO	HOM			91st	0^{1}	
2019	Kaulig Racing	10	Chevy	DAY	ATL	LVS	PHO	CAL	TEX	BRI	RCH	TAL	DOV	CLT	POC	MCH	IOW	CHI	DAY; 38	KEN	NHA	IOW	GLN; 37*	MOH; 3	BRI	**ROA**; 24	DAR	IND	LVS	RCH	ROV; 1	DOV	KAN	TEX	PHO	HOM			39th	105	
2020	Kaulig Racing	16	Chevy	DAY; DNQ	LVS	CAL	PHO	DAR	CLT	BRI; 10	ATL; 1	HOM	HOM; 4	TAL; 7	POC	IRC; 4	KEN	KEN	TEX	KAN	ROA; 2	DRC; 4	DOV	DOV	DAY; 15*	DAR	RCH	RCH	BRI	LVS	TAL; 24	ROV; 1	KAN	TEX	MAR; 26	PHO			24th	366	
2021	Kaulig Racing	16	Chevy	DAY; 5	DRC; 35	HOM; 14	LVS; 1	PHO; 5	ATL; 5	MAR; 13	TAL; 3	DAR; 13	DOV; 4	COA; 2	CLT; 33	MOH; 1	TEX; 6	NSH; 5	POC; 5	ROA; 4*	ATL; 13	NHA; 12	GLN; 2	**IRC**; 2	MCH; 1*	DAY; 2*	DAR; 20	RCH; 18	BRI; 1	LVS; 7	TAL; 39	ROV; 1	TEX; 6	KAN; 3	MAR; 7	PHO; 14			4th	4023	
2022	Kaulig Racing	16	Chevy	DAY; 2	**CAL**; 7	**LVS**; 9	PHO; 7	ATL; 3*	COA; 1*	RCH; 4	MAR; 3	TAL; 3	DOV; 6	DAR; 8	TEX; 9	CLT; 19	PIR; 1	NSH; 16	ROA; 6	ATL; 10	NHA; 20	POC; 4	**IRC**; 1*	MCH; 7	GLN; 2	DAY; 3	DAR; 3	KAN; 6	BRI; 6	TEX; 4	TAL; 1	**ROV**; 1*	**LVS**; 22	HOM; 3	MAR; 16	PHO; 5			5th	2333	
2023	Kaulig Racing	10	Chevy	DAY	CAL	LVS	PHO	ATL	**COA**; 1*	RCH	MAR	TAL	DOV	DAR	CLT	PIR	SON; 2	NSH; 1	CSC	ATL	NHA	POC	**ROA**; 9	MCH	**IRC**; 3	GLN	DAY	DAR	KAN	BRI	TEX	ROV	LVS	HOM	MAR	PHO			73rd	0^{1}	
2024	Kaulig Racing	16	Chevy	DAY; 10	ATL; 13	LVS; 6	PHO; 18	COA; 10*	RCH; 14	MAR; 36	TEX; 4	TAL; 19	DOV; 6	DAR; 35	CLT; 5	PIR; 4	SON; 17	IOW; 37	NHA; 11	NSH; 7	CSC; 11	POC; 6	IND; 8	MCH; 10	DAY; 24*	DAR; 27	ATL; 3*	GLN; 3	BRI; 10	KAN; 17	TAL; 11	ROV; 2*	LVS; 1*	HOM; 10	MAR; 38	PHO; 9			3rd	4028	

==== Craftsman Truck Series ====
NASCAR Craftsman Truck Series results
Year	Team	No.	Make	1	2	3	4	5	6	7	8	9	10	11	12	13	14	15	16	17	18	19	20	21	22	23	24	25	NCTC	Pts	Ref
2006	Bill Davis Racing	24	Toyota	DAY	CAL	ATL	MAR	GTW	CLT	MFD	DOV	TEX	MCH	MLW	KAN	KEN	MEM	IRP	NSH	BRI	NHA; 13	LVS	TAL; 5	MAR	ATL; 34	TEX	PHO	HOM	46th	350	
2007	Darrell Waltrip Motorsports	00	Toyota	DAY; 15	CAL; 25	ATL; 27	MAR; 27	KAN	CLT; 2	MFD	DOV; 9	TEX	MCH; 32	MLW	MEM	KEN	IRP	NSH	BRI; 21	GTW	NHA; 34	LVS	TAL	MAR	ATL	TEX	PHO	HOM	34th	916	
2008	Morgan-Dollar Motorsports	47	Chevy	DAY	CAL; 17	ATL	MAR	KAN	CLT	MFD	DOV	TEX	MCH	MLW	MEM	KEN	IRP	NSH	BRI	GTW	NHA	LVS	TAL	MAR	ATL	TEX	PHO	HOM	115th	0	
2021	GMS Racing	23	Chevy	DAY	DRC	LVS	ATL	BRD	RCH	KAN	DAR	COA	CLT	TEX	NSH	POC	KNX	GLN; 27	GTW	DAR	BRI	LVS	TAL	MAR	PHO				111th	0^{1}	
2026	Kaulig Racing	10	Ram	DAY	ATL	STP	DAR; 11	CAR	BRI	TEX																			107th	0^{1}	
2026	Kaulig Racing	25	Ram								GLN; 6	DOV	CLT	NSH	MCH	COR	LRP	NWS	IRP	RCH	NHA	BRI	KAN	CLT	PHO	TAL	MAR	HOM	107th	0^{1}	

^{*} Season still in progress
^{1} Ineligible for series points

=== Complete sports car racing results ===
==== Rolex Sports Car Series results ====
(key) (Races in bold indicate pole position) (Races in italics indicate fastest lap)

Year	Entrant	Class	Car	Engine	1	2	3	4	5	6	7	8	9	10	11	12	13	14	15	Rank	Points	Ref
2006	Michael Shank Racing	DP	Riley Mk XI	Lexus 5.0 L V8	DAY; 2	MEX	HOM	LBH	VIR	LAG	PHX	LIM	WGL	DAY	BAR	WGL	SON	MMP		88th	32	
2007	Michael Shank Racing	DP	Riley Mk XI	Lexus 5.0 L V8	DAY; 16	MEX	HOM	VIR	LAG	WGL	MOH	DAY	IOW	BAR	CGV	WGL	SON	MMP		101st	15	
2008	Michael Shank Racing	DP	Riley Mk XI	Ford 5.0 L V8	DAY; 9	HOM	MEX	VIR	LAG	LIM	WGL	MOH	DAY	BAR	CGV	WGL	SON	NJE	MMP	66th	22	
2009	Michael Shank Racing	DP	Riley Mk XX	Ford 5.0 L V8	DAY; 19	VIR	NJE	LAG	WGL	MOH	DAY	BAR	WGL	CGV	MMP	HOM				80th	12	
2010	Michael Shank Racing	DP	Riley Mk XI	Ford 5.0 L V8	DAY; 7	HOM	BAR	VIR	LIM	WGL	MOH	DAY	NJE	WGL	CGV	MMP				45th	24	
2011	Michael Shank Racing	DP	Dallara	Ford 5.0 L V8	DAY; 7	HOM	BAR	VIR	LIM	LAG	WGL	MOH	DAY	NJE	WGL	CGV	MMP			46th	24	
2012	Michael Shank Racing	DP	Riley Mk. XXVI	Ford 5.0 L V8	DAY; 1	BAR	HOM	NJE	DET	MOH	ROA	WGL	IMS	WGL	CGV	LAG	LIM			33rd	35	
2013	Michael Shank Racing	DP	Riley Mk. XXVI	Ford 5.0 L V8	DAY; 3	COA	BAR	RAL	DET	MOH	WGL									60th	21	
2013	Michael Shank Racing w/ Curb Agajanian	DP	Riley Mk. XXVI	Ford 5.0 L V8								IMS; 10	ROA	KAN	LAG	LIM				60th	21	

==== IMSA WeatherTech Sportscar Championship ====
Year	Team	Class	Make	Engine	1	2	3	4	5	6	7	8	9	10	11	Rank	Points	Ref
2014	Michael Shank Racing	P	Ford EcoBoost Riley DP	Ford Ecoboost 3.5 L Turbo V6	DAY; 12	SEB	LBH	LGA	DET	WGL	MSP	IND	ELK	COA	PET	50th	20	
2015	Michael Shank Racing with Curb Agajanian	P	Ligier JS P2	Honda HR28TT 2.8 L Turbo V6	**DAY**; 5	SEB	LBH	LGA	DET	WGL	MSP	ELK	COA	PET		26th	27	
2016	Michael Shank Racing with Curb-Agajanian	P	Ligier JS P2	Honda HR35TT 3.5 L Turbo V6	DAY; 11	SEB	LBH	LGA	DET	WGL	MSP	ELK	COA	PET		34th	21	
2018	Michael Shank Racing with Curb-Agajanian	GTD	Acura NSX GT3	Acura 3.5 L Turbo V6	DAY; 2	SEB	MOH	DET	WGL	MSP	LRP	ELK	VIR	LGA	PET	47th	32	
2019	Michael Shank Racing with Curb-Agajanian	GTD	Acura NSX GT3	Acura 3.5 L Turbo V6	DAY; 5	SEB	MOH	DET	WGL	MSP	LIM	ELK	VIR	LGA	PET	48th	28	
2020	Heinricher Racing with Michael Shank Racing	GTD	Acura NSX GT3 Evo	Acura 3.5 L Turbo V6	DAY; 8	DAY	SEB	ELK	VIR	ATL	MOH	CLT	PET	LGA	SEB	47th	23	
2021	Meyer Shank Racing with Curb-Agajanian	DPi	Acura ARX-05	Acura AR35TT 3.5 L Turbo V6	DAY; 4	SEB	MOH	DET	WGL	WGL	ELK	LGA	LBH	PET		18th	308	
2026	Acura Meyer Shank Racing w/Curb-Agajanian	GTP	Acura ARX-06	Acura AR24e 2.4 L Turbo V6	DAY; 9	SEB	LBH	LGA	DET	WGL	ELK	IMS	PET			31st	248	

==== 24 Hours of Daytona ====
24 Hours of Daytona results
Year	Class	No	Team	Car	Co-drivers	Laps	Position	Class Pos.
2006	DP	60	(United States) Michael Shank Racing	Lexus Riley DP	(Brazil) Oswaldo Negri Jr. (United States) Mark Patterson (United Kingdom) Justin Wilson	733	2	2
2007	DP	6	(United States) Michael Shank Racing	Lexus Riley DP	(United States) Henry Zogaib (United Kingdom) Ian James (Canada) Paul Tracy	595	26	16
2008	DP	6	(United States) Michael Shank Racing	Ford Riley DP	(United States) John Pew (United Kingdom) Ian James (United States) Burt Frisselle	652	14	9
2009	DP	6	(United States) Michael Shank Racing	Ford Riley DP	(Canada) Michael Valiante (United Kingdom) Ian James (United States) John Pew	153	47 ^{DNF}	19 ^{DNF}
2010	DP	6	(United States) Michael Shank Racing	Ford Riley DP	(United States) Mark Patterson (Canada) Michael Valiante (United States) Brian Frisselle	707	7 ^{DNF}	7 ^{DNF}
2011	DP	6	(United States) Michael Shank Racing	Ford Dallara DP	(United States) Michael McDowell (United Kingdom) Justin Wilson	719	7	7
2012	DP	60	(United States) Michael Shank Racing	Ford Riley DP	(Brazil) Oswaldo Negri Jr. (United States) John Pew (United Kingdom) Justin Wilson	761	1	1
2013	DP	6	(United States) Michael Shank Racing	Ford Riley DP	(Australia) Marcos Ambrose (Brazil) Oswaldo Negri Jr. (United States) John Pew (United Kingdom) Justin Wilson	709	3	3
2014	P	60	(United States) Michael Shank Racing	Ford Riley DP	(Brazil) Oswaldo Negri Jr. (United States) John Pew (United Kingdom) Justin Wilson	599	47	12
2015	P	60	(United States) Michael Shank Racing	Ligier JS P2	(Brazil) Oswaldo Negri Jr. (United States) John Pew (United States) Matt McMurry	705	9 ^{DNF}	5 ^{DNF}
2016	P	60	(United States) Michael Shank Racing	Ligier JS P2	(Brazil) Oswaldo Negri Jr. (United States) John Pew (France) Olivier Pla	285	50 ^{DNF}	11 ^{DNF}
2018	GTD	86	(United States) Michael Shank Racing with Curb Agajanian	Acura NSX GT3	(United Kingdom) Katherine Legge (Portugal) Álvaro Parente (United States) Trent Hindman	751	22	2
2019	GTD	86	(United States) Michael Shank Racing with Curb Agajanian	Acura NSX GT3	(Germany) Mario Farnbacher (United States) Trent Hindman (United States) Justin Marks	561	21	5
2020	GTD	57	(United States) Heinricher Racing with Michael Shank Racing	Acura NSX GT3 Evo	(Canada) Misha Goikhberg (United States) Trent Hindman (Portugal) Álvaro Parente	762	25	8
2021	DPi	60	(United States) Meyer Shank Racing w/ Curb-Agajanian	Acura ARX-05	(United States) Dane Cameron (Colombia) Juan Pablo Montoya (France) Olivier Pla	807	4	4
2026	GTP	60	(United States) Acura Meyer Shank Racing w/ Curb-Agajanian	Acura ARX-06	(United Kingdom) Tom Blomqvist (United States) Colin Braun (New Zealand) Scott Dixon	705	9	9

Sporting positions
Preceded by Jon Fogarty	Toyota Atlantic Champion; 2003	Succeeded by Jon Fogarty
Preceded by Nicolas Rondet	Barber Dodge Pro Series Champion; 2002	Succeeded by Leo Maia
Awards and achievements
Preceded by Sébastien Bourdais	Champ Car Rookie of the Year; 2004	Succeeded by Timo Glock
Preceded by Dan Wheldon	Autosport Rookie of the Year; 2004	Succeeded by Tiago Monteiro
