= International Kart Federation =

Kart racing organization

The International Kart Federation was the first kart racing organization in the United States, founded and still based in California in 1957. In 1971 it was joined by the World Karting Association, which originally focused more on the Eastern and Central United States.

The International Kart Federation (IKF) serves as a governing body for the sport of kart racing. In recognition of the need for controls over the sport, the International Kart Federation has published rules for competition since November 21, 1957. The objectives of the Federation are to foster strong and fair competition, to provide reasonable rules for the various types of competition, to administer the competition program with impartiality, and to reduce the hazards associated with the sport.

Entrants, drivers and participants in general are required to be fully conversant with these regulations and any supplementary rules or instructions governing an event, and are, by reason of their entry therein, bound by such regulations, supplementary rules, or instructions.

The prime responsibility for the condition and operation of a kart or any other vehicle in competition rests with the owner/driver. The track operator's main responsibility is that of providing a suitable place to conduct events. IKF is the vital link between these two, producing Rules and Regulations of Competition, based on experience gained at racing events all over the world. IKF seeks to communicate this experience to all sectors of the sport, to protect the outstanding safety record of karting, and to maintain the integrity of the sport.

Many children/young adults use karting as a stepping stone into other forms of racing.

== See also ==
- World Karting Association, another U.S. karting association
- Commission Internationale de Karting (CIK-FIA), the international sanctioning body for kart racing
