= British Universities Karting Championship =

Collegiate kart racing championship in the United Kingdom

- Category: Kart racing
- Country: United Kingdom
- Affiliations: Motorsport UK
- Inaugural season: 1997; 29 years ago, as the National University Karting Competition
- Classes: Premier, Clubman, Intermediate
- Teams: 135
- Manufacturers: Club100
- Chassis suppliers: Birel ART
- Engine suppliers: Rotax
- Tyre suppliers: Dunlop
- Drivers' champion: (Guernsey) Sam Heathcote; (University of Southampton)
- Teams' champion: Southampton; (Premier); Coventry; (Clubman); Surrey; (Intermediate)
- Most titles: Loughborough; Oxford Brookes; (6 titles each)
- Official website: bukc.co.uk

The British Universities Karting Championship (BUKC), formerly known as the Inter University Karting Championship (IUKC), is a university-based kart racing competition in the United Kingdom operated by Club100 and licensed by Motorsport UK. Founded in 1997 as the National University Karting Competition (NUKC), it is contested by 135 teams from a pool of 115 universities and over 1,300 licensed drivers, making it one of the largest karting competitions in the world.

The BUKC is unique in collegiate karting by its usage of two-stroke engines; since 2019, it has operated with Rotax Junior Max engines on a Birel ART chassis, having previously used TKM engines from 2002 onwards. Each season takes place across five main rounds in three classes, followed by the annual Drivers' Championship and 24 Hour Race. Loughborough and Oxford Brookes hold the record for most national championships, each having won the premier title on six occasions. The reigning champions are Southampton, who beat Bath on count-back in 2026.

Former BUKC entrants have included one Formula One driver—Emanuele Pirro—and two FIA World Endurance vice-champions, as well as several national karting champions, Formula Two, Formula Three, touring car, GT3, and GT4 drivers. BUKC alumni have won numerous major motorsport titles, including the: 24 Hours of Le Mans, 12 Hours of Sebring, European Le Mans Series, American Le Mans Series, Nürburgring 24 Hours, British GT Championship, Italian Superturismo Championship, 24 Hours of Spa, Formula 3 Euro Series, and Ferrari Challenge Finali Mondiali.

== History ==
=== Establishment (1997–2001) ===
==== National University Karting Competition ====
The first University Karting Competition was organised by the University of Nottingham in 1997 and consisted of three 40 minute endurance races at Daytona International race circuit in Milton Keynes. It was contested by 14 teams from 7 universities, and won by University of Warwick.

==== Inter University Karting ====
From 1998 to 2001, the competition was renamed the Inter University Karting Championship (IUKC) and run by the Cardiff University. They ran events at various tracks around the country, mixing both indoor and outdoor venues, using hire karts.

=== Association with Club100 (2002–present) ===
==== 2002–2018: TKM era ====
In 2002, the IUKC began an association with Club100, who supplied a fleet of two-stroke Formula TKM karts, becoming the first university karting championship to be run with two-stroke engines. The season was contested by 32 teams over four rounds, and won by Loughborough University.

In 2003, the format was altered, with a fifth round added; the championship renamed to the British Universities Karting Championship. In order to keep the organisation consistent and the relationship with Club100 strong, Batho and Tew founded 3T Racing Ltd in 2003 as an independent governing body for the championship.

Between 2004 and 2006, Oxford Brookes University won three consecutive titles led by James Gornall, remaining the only university to complete a three-peat in the BUKC as of 2024.

Emanuele Pirro entered the first round of the 2015 season at Rye House as an independent entrant, becoming the first Formula One driver to compete in the BUKC. The season was contested by 90 teams, with 13 qualifying for the Premier class and 13 for the Intermediate. The winners of the 2015 Drivers' Championship qualified for the Red Bull Kart Fight at Buckmore Park.

In 2018, the final season of the TKM era, Oxford Brookes became the first—and to this date, only—team to have achieved a 1–2 finish in the Premier class championship standings. Across nine rounds, Oxford Brookes A and B won six rounds with 12 podiums, achieving a 1–2 finish in qualifiers and round one. Oxford Brookes C also managed to finish the championship in ninth.

The final BUKC event raced with TKM engines was the 2019 season qualifiers at Whilton Mill in November 2018, won by Brunel University London and the University of Birmingham on the Friday and Saturday, respectively.

==== 2019–present: Rotax era ====
For 2019, Club100 replaced their fleet of Formula TKM karts with Rotax karts, utilising their Evo technology, ending a 17-year tenure of the BUKC using TKM karts.

To mark the new era, the championship was re-divided into three classes: Premier, Clubman and Intermediate (previously Premier, Intermediate and Rookie). The Premier and Clubman class championships are competed in the same races, with Intermediate the day after being targeted at less experienced drivers and teams. The BUKC partnered with Racing Pride that year, which was co-founded by former Cambridge captain Richard Morris.

Coventry University are the only team to win multiple championships in the Rotax era, winning back-to-back in 2019 and 2020. In 2021, Loughborough won their record-breaking sixth Premier class championship, with Oxford Brookes equalling this one year later.

The championship is contested by 126 teams from 65 universities over five main rounds, including qualifiers, with over 1,300 licensed drivers.

== Format ==
The BUKC uses a unique format that races in teams of four drivers, taking place across a number of rounds throughout the academic year at several world-class kart circuits in the United Kingdom.

=== Calendar ===
For the 2026 season, five rounds are set to take place at five venues across the United Kingdom: Whilton Mill, Buckmore Park, Warden Law, Dunkeswell, and Silverstone. The post-season 24 Hour Race will take place at Teesside Autodrome.

Round		Circuit	Date	Winning team	Runners-up	Third place
Q	Fri	Whilton Mill (International, Northamptonshire)	14 November 2025	Hertfordshire A	Derby A	Oxford Brookes A
Q	Sat	Whilton Mill (International, Northamptonshire)	15 November 2025	Southampton A	Edinburgh A	Bath A
Q	Sun	Whilton Mill (International, Northamptonshire)	16 November 2025	Surrey A	Loughborough A	Reading A
1	R1	Buckmore Park (International, Kent)	29 January 2026	Bath A	Southampton A	Reading A
1	R2	Buckmore Park (International, Kent)	29 January 2026	Southampton A	Reading A	Bath A
1	I1	Buckmore Park (International, Kent)	30 January 2026	Surrey C	UCL C	Coventry C
2	R3	Warden Law (International, Tyne and Wear)	4 March 2026	Southampton A	Bath A	Oxford Brookes A
2	R4	Warden Law (International, Tyne and Wear)	4 March 2026	Southampton A	Surrey A	Bath A
2	I2	Warden Law (International, Tyne and Wear)	5 March 2026	Leeds Beckett A	Surrey C	Cambridge A
3	R5	Llandow (Vale of Glamorgan)	18 March 2026	Bath A	Loughborough A	Loughborough B
3	R6	Llandow (Vale of Glamorgan)	18 March 2026	Bath A	Southampton A	Loughborough B
3	I3	Llandow (Vale of Glamorgan)	19 March 2026	Liverpool A	Leeds Beckett A	Swansea B
4	R7	Silverstone (Grand Prix, Northamptonshire)	21 April 2026	Loughborough B	Southampton A	Bath A
4	R8	Silverstone (Grand Prix, Northamptonshire)	21 April 2026	Loughborough B	Bath A	Oxford Brookes A
4	I4	Silverstone (Grand Prix, Northamptonshire)	23 April 2026	Coventry C	Sheffield B	Liverpool A
24H		Teesside Autodrome (International, North Yorkshire)	13–14 June 2026	To be determined		

=== Qualifiers ===
Qualifiers is a pre-championship round that takes place to determine which teams qualify for each class championship. The results of the round count towards each championship.

The championship qualifiers take place across 14 qualifying sessions, followed by 14 respective sprint races. The event is split over two days in randomly generated groups.

Of the 126 teams that enter qualifiers: 26 qualify for the Premier class championship, 28 for Clubman, and 54 for Intermediate.

=== National championship ===
In the Premier/Clubman class championships, commonly known as mains, each round takes place across six back-to-back races with randomly generated grids.

Each mains round is competed in one of two formats: sprint or endurance. In a mains sprint round, the six races alternate between lightweight (75 kg) and heavyweight (82 kg) races.

The sprint format is where each driver in the team gets to race in their own individual 25-minute race with no fuel stops or driver changes. Each team's score for the round is determined by the best three results from the four sprint races entered.

The endurance format splits each team into duos. Each duo competes in a one-hour endurance race. Two fuel stops a minimum of one driver change must be made by each duo. Each team's score for the round is determined by the points from both races entered.

=== Intermediate championship ===
In the Intermediate class championship, commonly known as inters, each round takes place across six qualifying sessions, followed by six respective sprint races. In an inters round, each race is run to a 75 kg minimum weight.

Since 2019, the Intermediate class has been the tertiary championship to the Premier and Clubman classes, replacing the Rookies class. This table only includes the Intermediate class champions after the re-branding, as well as the previous Rookies class champions. The Rookies designation was still used from 2019 to 2021 for non-championship individual races at intermediate-class events, featuring unlicensed drivers.

The Graduates class championship, also known as grads, ran from 2017 to 2019, offering a chance for non-recent graduates of each respective university to continue competing in the BUKC.

=== Points system ===
Points are awarded for each race in increments of one, with the highest-finishing eligible driver receiving 60. Unlike other motorsport series, there are no points awarded for pole position or fastest lap.

In a sprint round, the best three results from each team are counted towards the points tally for the round, whereas both sets of results count in an endurance round.

The same championship points system is awarded for each overall round, with the best seven rounds from each mains team's campaign counting towards their final tally, and the best four from each inters team, both including qualifiers.

In the event of a tie in either a round or the championship standings, a countback system is used.

==== Penalties and sanctions ====
Similar to Club100, the BUKC uses position penalties as opposed to the time penalties standard in other series. Penalties are awarded for general driving infringements, such as forcing a driver off-circuit, gaining an illicit advantage from contact, and corner-cutting. To preserve the karts, strict penalties are also enforced for track limits, kart-to-kart contact, accelerating from stationary on a grass run-off area, and contact with cones, which are placed at various apexes. Team disqualifications and point deductions are reserved for more serious offences, such as modifying the kart and tweaking the carburettor. The strictness of the system has resulted in several championships being decided on the basis of clean, penalty-free driving. A video assistant referee (VAR) system debuted at Silverstone in 2026, to analyse and verify the penalising decisions made by marshals.

== Universities ==
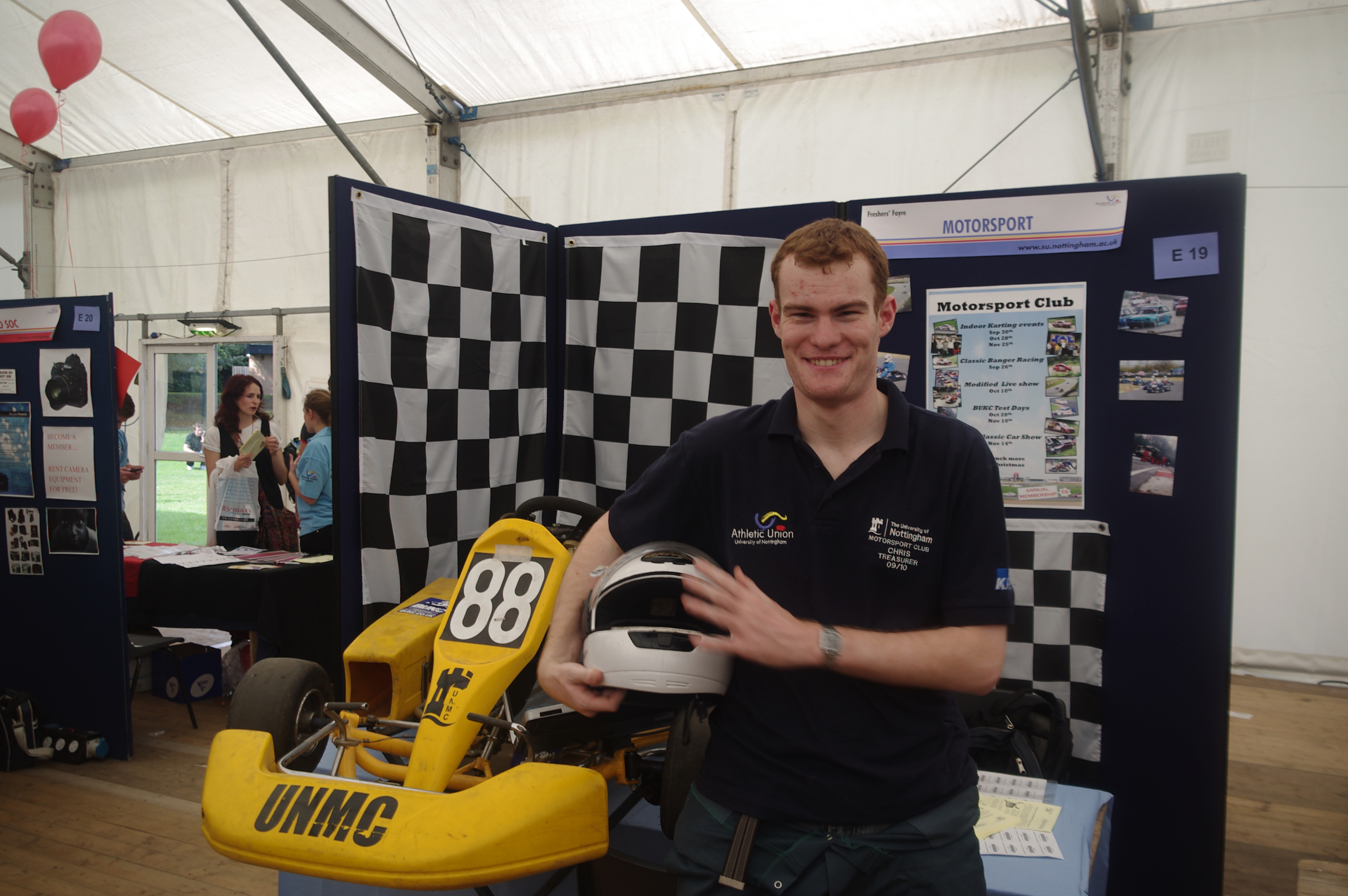
Over 50 universities have entered the BUKC and operate independent motorsport societies.

The BUKC is open to entries from any institution of higher education in the United Kingdom on approval from Club100. Each university may be represented by multiple teams of four drivers; Loughborough fielded three teams in 2008, with several universities following. Oxford Brookes became the first university to qualify six teams for the national championship in 2022, with five entering the premier class. In 2026, 135 teams from 45 universities entered qualifiers, with nine universities qualifying at least four teams:

- Bath (5);
- Coventry (5);
- Loughborough (5);
- Birmingham (4);
- Leeds (4);
- Oxford Brookes (4);
- Sheffield (4);
- Surrey (4);
- West of England (4).

The BUKC primarily receives entries from universities in Southern England and the Midlands. There have been two championship-winning universities from Northern England: Leeds (2003) and Huddersfield (2015). Wales has been represented by Aberystwyth, Cardiff, South Wales, Swansea, and Trinity St David, the latter finishing runner-up in 2009 as its predecessor Swansea Institute and Cardiff repeating this feat in 2025, having won the IUKC in 2000; Swansea won the 24 Hour Race and Cardiff won the graduates class in 2018.

In 2009, Edinburgh became the first Scottish university to enter the BUKC, with nearby Heriot-Watt following in 2010; Edinburgh Napier, Glasgow, St Andrews, Stirling, Strathclyde, and the West of Scotland have since joined. A joint entry between Heriot-Watt and the West of Scotland won the 24 Hour Race in 2016, when the former also won the secondary title, while Strathclyde won the tertiary title in both 2018 and 2020. The West of Scotland finished a Scottish-highest seventh in the 2016 premier-class standings, which was eclipsed by Edinburgh's sixth-place a decade later.

Queen's Belfast became the first Northern Irish university to enter the BUKC in 2015. The year prior, DIT—known as TU Dublin since 2019—became the first Irish university to compete in the BUKC; they have contested the 24 Hour Race annually since then, winning in 2022 and 2023. Limerick are also registered to compete. The U.S.-based Hult entered and qualified in 2014. Institutions without university status have included Andover College, Caterham School, and Myerscough College. The Universities at Medway also made a combined entry from 2012 and 2015. Non-classified guest drivers are typically entered as members of the "University of Life".

== Karts ==
The BUKC are partnered with Club100 to provide karts for the championship, who operate the largest arrive-and-drive kart fleet in Europe. The two-stroke 125cc Rotax engines produce over 20 hp, and are capable of speeds in excess of 70 mph. The karts use slick Dunlop tyres in all weather conditions, with Club100 citing the logistical challenges faced with changing the tyres on over 50 karts. In 2019, the BUKC moved from air-cooled Formula TKM engines to Rotax.

BUKC kart specification (2023–present)
Chassis	Birel ART N35X
Engine	Rotax Junior Max Evo 125 cc
Carburettor	Dell'Orto F34mm fixed-jet
Transmission	Clutch, chain drive
Brakes	Kelgate K
Tyres	Dunlop KE1
Power	Free-revving 20 hp two-stroke

== Circuits ==
Locations of the BUKC since 2002.
2026 venues in bold. 24 Hour Race venues in italics.
^{†} CIK-FIA international circuit. ^{‡} Former CIK-FIA international circuit.

Since the BUKC switched to an outdoor, two-stroke format in 2002, it has been contested at 15 different venues throughout the United Kingdom, with 13 situated in England—Bayford Meadows, Buckmore Park, Clay Pigeon, Ellough Park, Hooton Park, PF International, Rye House, Shenington, Silverstone, Teesside, Three Sisters, Warden Law, and Whilton Mill—and two in Wales: Glan y Gors and Llandow. Both PF International and Rye House have hosted the CIK-FIA World Championship. The BUKC is yet to race in either Scotland or Northern Ireland.

== Live coverage ==
The championship is broadcast live on YouTube by Alpha Live with live footage, commentary provided by John Ratcliffe and Reeve Taylor, alongside interviews from Piers Prior for all Premier and Clubman class races.

The opening race of the 2024 season at PF International had a record viewership of over 11 thousand people with a season average of 10.1 thousand, comparable to viewership of BUCS Super Rugby, whose live coverage averaged 8.73 thousand viewers in the 2023–24 season (including play-offs).

Alpha Timing provide live timing for each BUKC event, including testing and qualifiers, via their website.

== Champions ==
Tyres key
**B**	Bridgestone	**L**	LeCont
**C**	Carlisle	**M**	Maxxis
**D**	Dunlop	**M**	MG Tires
**G**	Goodyear	**M**	Mojo
**K**	Komet	**V**	Vega

=== Four-stroke (1997–2001) ===
Year	Champions	Chassis	Engine	Tyres	Runners-up	Third place
**NUKC**
1997	Warwick	Various			Imperial	Nottingham
**IUKC**
1998	Imperial	Various				
1999	Bournemouth	Various			Nottingham	Warwick
2000	Cardiff	Various			Southampton	Bournemouth
2000	Cardiff	Various			Southampton	West of England (Note: Bournemouth and the West of England ended the season tied on 29 points, with no tie-breaking method.)
2001	Nottingham	Various			Kingston	Southampton

=== Premier (2002–present) ===
Year	Champions	Chassis	Engine	Tyres	Wins	Podiums	Points	% Points	Runners-up	Margin	Third place
**IUKC**
2002	Loughborough	BIZ	TKM	B	2	4	390	97.500	Leeds	5	Swansea
**BUKC**
2003	Leeds	BIZ	TKM	B	3	5	138	98.571	Imperial	1	Oxford Brookes
2004	Oxford Brookes	Vtec	TKM	B					Loughborough		Leeds
2005	Oxford Brookes (2)	Vtec	TKM	B	3	4	295	98.333	Loughborough	2	Leeds
2006	Oxford Brookes (3)	Vtec	TKM	B	6	7	360	100.000	Leeds	14	Imperial
2007	Hertfordshire	Birel	TKM	B	4	5	351	97.500	Oxford Brookes	1	Warwick
2008	Loughborough A (2)	Birel	TKM	B	1	4	399	95.000	Loughborough B	0 (Note: Loughborough A and Loughborough B ended the season tied on 399 points, with Loughborough A clinching the championship on count-back by virtue of having more third-placed finishes.)	Oxford Brookes
2009	Oxford Brookes (4)	Birel	TKM	B	1	5	351	97.500	Swansea Met	2	Loughborough
2010	Loughborough (3)	Birel	TKM	B	5	6	416	99.048	Oxford Brookes	10	Warwick
2011	Bath	Birel	TKM	B	3	5	410	97.619	Loughborough	0 (Note: Bath and Loughborough ended the season tied on 410 points, with Bath clinching the championship on count-back by virtue of having more round wins.)	Coventry
2012	Loughborough (4)	Birel	TKM	B	4	8	417	99.286	Hertfordshire	6	Southampton
2013	Hertfordshire (2)	Birel	TKM	B	5	6	415	98.810	Southampton	1	Oxford Brookes
2014	Coventry	Birel	TKM	V	4	6	414	98.571	Oxford Brookes	6	Hertfordshire
2015	Huddersfield	Birel ART	TKM	V	2	8	414	98.571	Oxford Brookes	3	Coventry
2016	Coventry (2)	Birel ART	TKM	V	2	5	409	97.381	Oxford Brookes	1	Nottingham
2017	Loughborough (5)	Birel ART	TKM	B	3	5	409	97.381	Oxford Brookes A	0 (Note: Loughborough and Oxford Brookes ended the season tied on 409 points, with Loughborough clinching the championship on count-back by virtue of having more tenth-placed finishes.)	Oxford Brookes C
2018	Oxford Brookes A (5)	Birel ART	TKM	B	4	6	413	98.333	Oxford Brookes B	5	Huddersfield
2019	Coventry (3)	Birel ART	TKM	B	2	3	405	96.429	Loughborough	1	Oxford Brookes
2019	Coventry (3)	Birel ART	Rotax	B	2	3	405	96.429	Loughborough	1	Oxford Brookes
2020	Coventry (4)	Birel ART	Rotax	B	4	6	412	98.095	Oxford Brookes	1	Exeter
2021	Loughborough (6)	Birel ART	Rotax	B	5	6	359	99.722	Cambridge	7	Oxford Brookes
2022	Oxford Brookes (6)	Birel ART	Rotax	B	3	5	408	97.143	Exeter	2	Manchester
2023	Exeter	Birel ART	Rotax	D	4	8	417	99.286	Oxford Brookes	16	Southampton
2024	Reading	Birel ART	Rotax	D	1	6	411	97.857	Bath	2	Coventry
2025	Bath (2)	Birel ART	Rotax	D	1	4	349	96.944	Cardiff	3	Oxford Brookes
2026	Southampton	Birel ART	Rotax	D	3	6	414	98.571	Bath	0 (Note: Southampton and Bath ended the season tied on 414 points, with Southampton clinching the championship on count-back by virtue of having more second-placed finishes.)	Loughborough

=== Clubman (2012–present) ===
Year	Champions	Chassis	Engine	Tyres	Runners-up	Third place
Intermediate
2012	Huddersfield	Birel	TKM	B	Oxford	Medway
2013	Brighton	Birel	TKM	B	Kingston	Birmingham
2014	Oxford	Birel	TKM	V	Coventry	West of England
2015	Durham	Birel ART	TKM	V	Southampton	Warwick
2016	Heriot-Watt	Birel ART	TKM	V	Oxford Brookes	Newcastle
2017	Nottingham Trent	Birel ART	TKM	B	Warwick	Birmingham
2018	Huddersfield (2)	Birel ART	TKM	B	Newcastle	King's
Clubman
2019	Sheffield	Birel ART	TKM	B	Leeds	Kingston
2019	Sheffield	Birel ART	Rotax	B	Leeds	Kingston
2020	Birmingham	Birel ART	Rotax	B	Leeds	Sheffield
2021	Leeds	Birel ART	Rotax	B	East Anglia	Oxford Brookes
2022	Brighton (2)	Birel ART	Rotax	B	Loughborough	Cambridge
2023	Nottingham Trent (2)	Birel ART	Rotax	D	Loughborough	Coventry
2024	Warwick	Birel ART	Rotax	D	Lancaster	Surrey
2025	Loughborough	Birel ART	Rotax	D	UCL	Birmingham
2026	Coventry	Birel ART	Rotax	D	Portsmouth	Manchester

=== Intermediate (2012–present) ===
Year	Champions	Chassis	Engine	Tyres	Runners-up	Third place
Rookies
2012	Plymouth	Birel	TKM	B	Nottingham	Bristol
2013	Coventry	Birel	TKM	B	Bristol	Cranfield
2014	Cranfield	Birel	TKM	V	Huddersfield	Plymouth
2015	Salford	Birel ART	TKM	V	West of England	Huddersfield
2016	Plymouth (2)	Birel ART	TKM	V	Surrey	Liverpool
2017	Surrey	Birel ART	TKM	B	Manchester	Plymouth
2018	Strathclyde	Birel ART	TKM	B	Surrey	Edinburgh
Intermediate
2019	Bath	Birel ART	TKM	B	Birmingham	West of England
2019	Bath	Birel ART	Rotax	B	Birmingham	West of England
2020	Strathclyde (2)	Birel ART	Rotax	B	Leicester	Surrey
2021	Central Lancashire	Birel ART	Rotax	B	Imperial	Leeds
2022	Coventry B (2)	Birel ART	Rotax	B	Coventry C	Loughborough
2023	Imperial	Birel ART	Rotax	D	Sheffield	Coventry
2024	Oxford Brookes	Birel ART	Rotax	D	Coventry	UCL
2025	West of England	Birel ART	Rotax	D	Coventry	Edinburgh
2026	Surrey (2)	Birel ART	Rotax	D	Leeds Beckett	Coventry

=== Graduates (2017–2019) ===
Year	Champions	Chassis	Engine	Tyres	Runners-up	Third place
2017	Sheffield	Birel ART	TKM	**B**	Brunel	Cardiff
2018	Cardiff	Birel ART	TKM	**B**	Brunel	Coventry
2018	Cardiff	Birel ART	TKM	**B**	Brunel	Nottingham
2019	Nottingham	Birel ART	Rotax	**B**	Loughborough	Brunel

== Drivers' Championship ==
Since 2013, the BUKC Drivers' Championship has been held after the final race week of the season. It is the only event of the BUKC season not held in university-based teams of four.

The championship is split into three classes: lightweight, heavyweight and graduates. Each class is divided into qualifying heats, being seeded into performance-based finals. The winners of each 'A final' are crowned as their respective class champions, with the top 10 from each progressing to the Super Final, which crowns the Drivers' Champion. The 2015 victors qualified for the Red Bull Kart Fight at Buckmore Park.

The 2021 championship was not held due to the COVID-19 pandemic in the United Kingdom. The 2024 championship, due to be held at Whilton Mill, was cancelled due to rising costs and low graduate entries.

Clay Pigeon Raceway in Dorset has hosted the most BUKC Drivers' Championships, with six. In 2023, 163 drivers entered the event.

Matthew Taylor of Oxford Brookes University is the only driver to win multiple Drivers' Championships, winning in 2019 and 2022.

=== Drivers' Champions ===
Year	Circuit	Drivers' Champion	Lightweight	Heavyweight	Super-heavyweight	Graduates
2008	Llandow (Vale of Glamorgan)		(Belgium) Christophe Hissette	(United Kingdom) Tristan Gibbs	(United Kingdom) Tony Pogson	
2009	Clay Pigeon (Dorset)					
2010	Llandow (Vale of Glamorgan)		(United Kingdom) Tom Dix (Cambridge)	(United Kingdom) Jordan Hill		
2011	Whilton Mill (International, Northamptonshire)		(United Kingdom) David Evans	(United Kingdom) Matt Cornwell (Loughborough)	(United Kingdom) Phil Gynn (Oxford Brookes)	
2012	Buckmore Park (International, Kent)		(United Kingdom) David Pittard (Brunel)	(United Kingdom) Steve Alvarez Brown (Hertfordshire)	(United Kingdom) Joe Richardson (Medway)	
2013	Whilton Mill (International, Northamptonshire)		(United Kingdom) William van Es (Durham)	(United Kingdom) Steve Alvarez Brown (2) (Hertfordshire)	(United Kingdom) Andrew Dawson (Durham)	(United Kingdom) Steve Hicks
2014	Clay Pigeon (Dorset)		(United Kingdom) William van Es (2) (Durham)	(United Kingdom) Andrew Lawrence (Trinity St David)	(United Kingdom) Chris Hanson (Hertfordshire)	(United Kingdom) Tom Dix
2015	Whilton Mill (International, Northamptonshire)	(United Kingdom) Joe Richardson (Medway)	(United Kingdom) William van Es (3) (Durham)	(United Kingdom) Joe Richardson (Medway)	(United Kingdom) Peter Rundle (Cardiff)	(United Kingdom) David Pittard
2016	Clay Pigeon (Dorset)	Sam Moffat (West of Scotland)	(Scotland) Jessica Alexander (Strathclyde)	Sam Moffat (West of Scotland)	Andy Grant (West of Scotland)	(United Kingdom) Mathew Tordoff
2017	Whilton Mill (International, Northamptonshire)	(United Kingdom) Robert Newman (Sheffield)	(Scotland) Jessica Alexander (2) (Strathclyde)	(United Kingdom) Jamie Dzyra (Oxford Brookes)	(Scotland) Josh Mitchell (Heriot-Watt)	(United Kingdom) Steve Hicks (2)
2018	Clay Pigeon (Dorset)	(United Kingdom) James DeHavillande (Newcastle)	(United Kingdom) Josef Jaques (Huddersfield)	(United Kingdom) Henry Jackson (Nottingham Trent)	(United Kingdom) Josh Gollin (Liverpool)	(United Kingdom) Peter Cole
2019	Whilton Mill (International, Northamptonshire)	(United Kingdom) Matthew Taylor (Oxford Brookes)	(United Kingdom) Jack Ransom (Oxford Brookes)	(United Kingdom) Harry Farnhill (Trinity St David)	(United Kingdom) Kirk Langley (Southampton)	(United Kingdom) Ed Barrs
2020	Clay Pigeon (Dorset)	(Belgium) Sam Spinnael (Coventry)	(Belgium) Sam Spinnael (Coventry)	(United Kingdom) Sam Pooley (Nottingham Trent)	(United Kingdom) Adam Fleming (Newcastle)	(United Kingdom) James DeHavillande
2021	Not held due to the COVID-19 pandemic					
2022	Llandow (Vale of Glamorgan)	(United Kingdom) Matthew Taylor (2) (Oxford Brookes)	(United Kingdom) Jonathan Dalton (Southampton)	(United Kingdom) Matthew Taylor (Oxford Brookes)	(United Kingdom) Blake Checketts (Gloucestershire)	(United Kingdom) Ed Barrs (2)
2023	Clay Pigeon (Dorset)	(United Kingdom) Fraser Brunton (Cardiff)	(United Kingdom) Fraser Brunton (Cardiff)	(United Kingdom) Axel Slijepcevic (Bath)	(United Kingdom) Max Wade (Birmingham)	(United Kingdom) Rhianna Purcocks
2024	Cancelled					
2025	Clay Pigeon (Dorset)	(United Kingdom) Jack Finch (Birmingham)	(United Kingdom) Fraser Brunton (2) (Cardiff)	(United Kingdom) Seb Marlow (Oxford Brookes)		
2026	Silverstone (Grand Prix, Northamptonshire)	(Guernsey) Sam Heathcote (Southampton)	(United Kingdom) Maxwell Dodds (Loughborough)	(United Kingdom) Axel Slijepcevic (2) (Graduate)		(United Kingdom) Axel Slijepcevic

== 24 Hour Race ==
The annual BUKC 24 Hour Race is held post-season at Teesside Autodrome, the largest kart circuit in the world, for up to 90 university teams. Unlike the regular season, non-recent graduates are able to enter their respective university's teams. The 24 Hour Race is the only event on the BUKC calendar that does not utilise Club100 machinery, instead using twin-engine 200cc Prokarts.

The event starts with a two-hour practice session, followed by a one-shot qualifying session, also known as superpole, to set the grid for the race. An endurance race is then run continuously for 24 hours, emulating the 24 Hours of Le Mans and 24 Hours of Daytona, which form two out of three legs of the Triple Crown of endurance racing.

=== Palmarès, 24 Hour Race ===
Unlike the main championship, which has been solely won by universities from England, English teams have only won seven of the eleven 24 Hour Races held, as of 2024. A mixed team of students from Scotland's Heriot-Watt University and the University of the West of Scotland won the event in 2016, followed by Wales' Swansea University in 2018, and Ireland's TU Dublin in 2022 and 2023, the latter becoming the first non-British team to win a BUKC event.

Year	Circuit	Winners	Distance			Runners-up	Interval	Third place
Year	Circuit	Winners	Laps	mi	km	Runners-up	Interval	Third place
2014	Teesside (National, North Yorkshire)	Loughborough	1,634	995.014	1,601.32	Brunel	+3 laps	Swansea
2015	Teesside (International, North Yorkshire)	Oxford Brookes	1,027	1,054.221	1,696.604	Coventry	+2 laps	Club100
2016	Teesside (International, North Yorkshire)	Heriot-Watt	1,048	1,075.777	1,731.296	Newcastle	+19.490	Nottingham
2016	Teesside (International, North Yorkshire)	West of Scotland	1,048	1,075.777	1,731.296	Newcastle	+19.490	Nottingham
2017	Teesside (International, North Yorkshire)	Nottingham	1,048	1,075.777	1,731.296	Coventry	+1 lap	Loughborough
2018	Teesside (International, North Yorkshire)	Swansea	1,056	1,083.990	1,744.512	Warwick	+53.449	Birmingham
2019	Teesside (International, North Yorkshire)	Huddersfield	1,012	1,038.823	1,671.824	Coventry	+59.861	Swansea
2020	Not held due to the COVID-19 pandemic							
2021	Teesside (International, North Yorkshire)	Birmingham	1,006	1,032.664	1,661.912	Swansea	+0.700	Oxford Brookes
2022	Teesside (International, North Yorkshire)	(Republic of Ireland) TU Dublin	1,034	1,061.406	1,708.168	Brighton	+5 laps	Hertfordshire
2023	Teesside (International, North Yorkshire)	(Republic of Ireland) TU Dublin (2)	990	1,016.240	1,635.480	Brighton	+7 laps	Sheffield
2024	Teesside (International, North Yorkshire)	Exeter	908	932.067	1,500.016	Central Lancashire	+7 laps	Lancaster
2025	Teesside (International, North Yorkshire)	Liverpool	1,022	1,049.088	1,688.344	Baguette Motorsports	+1 lap	Sheffield
2026	Teesside (International, North Yorkshire)	Coventry	1,030	1,057.300	1,701.560	The Lap Dancers	+1 lap	Liverpool

== Records and statistics ==
=== Most titles ===
As of 2026, 15 different universities have won the national championship across 30 seasons: Warwick, Imperial, Bournemouth, Cardiff, Nottingham, Loughborough, Leeds, Oxford Brookes, Hertfordshire, Bath, Coventry, Huddersfield, Exeter, Reading, and Southampton. All two-stroke, premier championship–winning teams in the BUKC have been from England, while Cardiff won the 2000 title on four-stroke karts.

Loughborough and Oxford Brookes hold the joint-record for most national titles, each with six. Coventry are the only team to win multiple championships in the Rotax era, taking back-to-back titles in 2019 and 2020. The three teams have dominated the championship since its inception, winning 16 of the 30 championships altogether, including seven consecutively from 2016 to 2022.

As of 2026, Nottingham, Exeter, and Reading are the only championship-winning universities who do not offer automotive engineering at an undergraduate level, the former two of which still offer mechanical engineering.

#	University	Titles	Years
1	Loughborough	6	2002, 2008, 2010, 2012, 2017, 2021
1	Oxford Brookes	6	2004, 2005, 2006, 2009, 2018, 2022
3	Coventry	4	2014, 2016, 2019, 2020
4	Hertfordshire	2	2007, 2013
4	Bath	2	2011, 2025
6	Warwick	1	1997†
6	Imperial	1	1998†
6	Bournemouth	1	1999†
6	Cardiff	1	2000†
6	Nottingham	1	2001†
6	Leeds	1	2003
6	Huddersfield	1	2015
6	Exeter	1	2023
6	Reading	1	2024
6	Southampton	1	2026
Source: (Note: Per several sources:)

^{†} Title won on four-stroke engines.

=== Most round wins ===
The universities with the most premier-class round wins since 2005:

#	University	Wins	Years
1	Oxford Brookes	43	2005–2006, 2008–2023, 2025
2	Loughborough	31	2005, 2008–2012, 2017–2022, 2026
3	Coventry	14	2012, 2014–2016, 2019–2020, 2024–2025
4	Hertfordshire	13	2005, 2007, 2012–2015
5	Southampton	12	2008, 2012–2013, 2023–2024, 2026
6	Bath	11	2010–2011, 2024–2026
7	Warwick	7	2007–2011
7	Exeter	7	2019, 2021–2023
—	London (Note: Federal university composed of 17 member institutions. Its round-winning members are Brunel (4), Kingston (1), and Imperial (1; member until 2007).)	6	2006, 2009, 2014, 2016–2017
9	Oxford	6	2008, 2016–2017
10	Brunel	4	2014, 2016–2017
10	Cardiff	4	2015, 2025
12	Huddersfield	3	2015, 2018
12	Manchester	3	2021–2023
12	Reading	3	2024–2025
15	Swansea Met (Note: Known as Swansea Institute of Higher Education until 2008.)	2	2007
15	Nottingham	2	2018–2019
15	Cambridge	2	2020, 2022
18	Leeds	1	2005
18	Imperial	1	2006
18	Bournemouth	1	2006
18	Plymouth	1	2008
18	Kingston	1	2009
18	Swansea	1	2011
18	Durham	1	2013
18	Leeds Beckett (Note: Known as Leeds Metropolitan University until 2014.)	1	2016
18	Sheffield	1	2017
18	Nottingham Trent	1	2023

Last updated on 21 April 2026.

== Notable alumni ==
Inclusion criteria: Entered the BUKC and competed in professional auto racing at an international level.

Driver	University	Season(s)	BUKC	Notes	Ref
(United Kingdom) Jamie Green	Swansea	2003–2004		2004 Formula 3 Euro Series Champion; 2015 Deutsche Tourenwagen Masters Vice-Champion	
(Canada) Jesse Mason	Swansea	2004–2005		2009 Indy Lights driver for Guthrie Meyer Racing	
(United Kingdom) James Gornall	Oxford Brookes	2004–2006	2004, 2005, and 2006 Champion	2008 British GT3 Champion	
(United Kingdom) James Cottingham	Bristol	2004–2007		2023 British GT3 Vice-Champion; FIA World Endurance Championship driver for United Autosports	
(Canada) Nelson Mason	Oxford Brookes	2006–2008	2006 Champion	2014 GP3 Series driver for Hilmer Motorsport	
(United Kingdom) Alex Brundle	Nottingham	2009–2011		2016 European Le Mans Series LMP3 Champion; 2013 FIA World Endurance LMP2 Vice-Champion	
(United Kingdom) Tom Oliphant	Warwick	2009–2014		Former British Touring Car Championship driver	
(United Kingdom) Steve Alvarez Brown	Hertfordshire	2011–2013	2013 Champion; 2012 Vice-Champion; 2012 and 2013 Heavyweight Drivers' Champion	Motorsport-based social media influencer, alias "Super GT"; Nürburgring Endurance Series driver for Black Falcon Team Bilstein	
(Spain) Ramón Piñeiro	Hertfordshire	2011–2014	2013 Champion	Third place in the 2011 FIA Formula Two Championship	
(United Kingdom) David Pittard	Brunel	2012–2014	2012 Lightweight Drivers' Champion; 2015 Graduate Drivers' Champion	2022 FIA World Endurance GTE Am Vice-Champion	
(Poland) Patryk Szczerbiński	Salford	2013–2015	2015 Rookies Champion	Former Porsche Supercup driver for Verva Racing Team	
(United Kingdom) Max Coates	Leeds Beckett	2014–2016		2019 Renault UK Clio Cup Vice-Champion; former BTCC driver for Pro Motorsport	
(Italy) Emanuele Pirro	Independent	2015 (Note: Only competed in round 1 as an independent entrant.)		Former Formula One driver for Benetton and Scuderia Italia; five-time 24 Hours of Le Mans winner; two-time American Le Mans Series Champion; two-time 12 Hours of Sebring winner	
(United Kingdom) Piers Prior	Loughborough	2017–2020	2017 Champion; 2019 Vice-Champion	2020 BRDC British Formula 3 driver for Lanan Racing; commentator for the BUKC, GB3, and FIA Formula 3	
(United States) Reece Ushijima	Oxford Brookes	2022 (Note: Only competed in qualifiers.)	2022 Champion	2022 FIA Formula 3 driver for Van Amersfoort Racing	
(United Kingdom) Tom Fleming	Reading	2023–2024	2024 Champion	2023 Ferrari Challenge Trofeo Pirelli World Champion; FIA World Endurance Championship and GT World Challenge Europe driver for Garage 59	
(United States) Cameron Das	Independent	2026 (Note: Only competed in rounds 7 and 8 as an independent entrant.)		2021 Euroformula Open Champion; 2016 F4 United States Champion	

== See also ==
- Club100
- Motorsport UK
- Kart racing
- List of kart racing championships
- List of British and Irish varsity matches
- Armorial of British universities
