= Steve Alvarez Brown =

British influencer and racing driver (born 1990)

- Born: 14 December 1990 (age 35); Cuxton, Kent, England
- Nationality: (United Kingdom) British

Nürburgring Langstrecken-Serie career
- Debut season: 2023
- Current team: Black Falcon Team Fanatec
- Categorisation: FIA Silver (until 2026); FIA Bronze (2027–)
- Car number: 150
- Starts: 21
- Wins: 8
- Podiums: 14
- Poles: 0
- Fastest laps: 0
- Best finish: 3rd in 2025 (SP8T)
- Statistics up to date as of 19 April 2026.

Twitch information
- Channel: SuperGT
- Years active: 2014–present
- Genres: Motor racing; sim racing
- Game: Gran Turismo
- Followers: 24k

YouTube information
- Channel: Super GT
- Years active: 2011–present
- Genres: Motor racing; sim racing
- Subscribers: 1.02 million
- Views: 353.40 million
- Last updated: 10 June 2025

Steve Alvarez Brown (born 14 December 1990), also known by his online pseudonym Super GT, is a British YouTuber and racing driver who competes in the Nürburgring Langstrecken-Serie for Black Falcon Team Fanatec.

Born and raised in Kent, Alvarez Brown began competitive kart racing aged 11. He progressed to sportscar racing in 2022, and has contested the Nürburgring Langstrecken-Serie since 2023 alongside fellow influencer Jimmy Broadbent. They finished second in-class at the Nürburgring 24 Hours in 2025.

As a content creator, Alvarez Brown was formerly a member of Lando Norris's Quadrant stable and has over one million subscribers on YouTube, focusing on sim racing and motor racing content.

== Early and personal life ==
Steve Alvarez Brown was born on 14 December 1990 in Cuxton, Kent, England.

== YouTube career ==
Alvarez Brown began content creation in 2011, primarily making sim racing content on Gran Turismo. He became one of the founding members of motorsport content creator stable Quadrant in 2020 alongside Lando Norris and Max Fewtrell. He reached one million subscribers in May 2025.

== Racing career ==
=== Karting (2001–present) ===
Alvarez Brown began his kart racing career aged 11—when his father bought his first go-kart—at the local Buckmore Park. Aged 17, he began competing in Club100 at Buckmore Park. He led the University of Hertfordshire to win the British Universities Karting Championship in 2013, where he further won the Heavyweight Drivers' Championship. He won the Premier Sprint Championship in Club100 three years later.

=== Sportscar racing (2022–present) ===
Alvarez Brown made his auto racing debut in 2022, contesting the Silverstone round of the BRSCC Mazda MX-5 Championship before claiming a podium in the Fun Cup, as well as entering the final round of the Radical SR1 Cup Championship at Donington Park. He had previously tested in Extreme E for Veloce Racing at the end of 2021. He was coached by Gordie Mutch.

In 2023, alongside fellow content creator Jimmy Broadbent, Alvarez Brown progressed to sportscar racing in the Nürburgring Langstrecken-Serie, driving the BMW 330i for the final four rounds of the season. They drove the BMW M4 GT4 Gen II in the SP8T class for Team Bilstein by Black Falcon in 2024. They recorded three victories from four podiums in their debut season. Alvarez Brown was excluded from the Nürburgring 24 Hours that year for speeding under Code 60 conditions in qualifying. They returned to the NLS in 2025 alongside Misha Charoudin and Manuel Metzger, claiming several podiums amongst finishing second in-class at the 24 Hours.

== Racing record ==
=== Racing career summary ===
Season	Series	Team	Races	Wins	Poles	F/Laps	Podiums	Points	Position
2023	Nürburgring Langstrecken-Serie – VT2-R+4WD	Black Falcon Team Bilstein	4	0	0	0	1	—N/a	NC†
2024	Nürburgring Langstrecken-Serie – SP8T	Team Bilstein by Black Falcon	7	3	0	0	4	—N/a	NC†
2024	24 Hours of Nürburgring – SP8T	Team Bilstein by Black Falcon	1	0	0	0	0	—N/a	EX
2025	Nürburgring Langstrecken-Serie – SP8T	Team Bilstein by Black Falcon	7	2	0	0	7	84	3rd
2025	24 Hours of Nürburgring – SP8T	Team Bilstein by Black Falcon	1	0	0	0	1	—N/a	2nd
2026	Nürburgring Langstrecken-Serie – AT2	Black Falcon Team Fanatec	3	3	0	0	3	8*	1st*
2026	24 Hours of Nürburgring – AT2	Black Falcon Team Fanatec	1	0	0	0	0	—N/a	DNF

^{†} As Alvarez Brown was a guest driver, he was ineligible for championship points.
* Season still in progress.

=== Nürburgring Langstrecken-Serie results ===
(key) (Races in bold indicate pole position; races in italics indicate fastest lap)

Year	Entrant	Co-Driver(s)	Car	Class	1	2	3	4	5	6	7	8	9	10	Pos	Points
2023	(Germany) Team Bilstein by Black Falcon	(United Kingdom) Jimmy Broadbent (Netherlands) Misha Charoudin	BMW 330i	VT2-R+4WD	NLS; 1	NLS; 2	NLS; 3	NLS; 4	NLS; 5	NLS; 6 Ret	NLS; 7; 5	NLS; 8; 3	NLS; 9; 4		NC†	—
2024	(Germany) Team Bilstein by Black Falcon	(United Kingdom) Jimmy Broadbent (Netherlands) Misha Charoudin (Germany) Manuel Metzger	BMW M4 GT4 Gen II	SP8T	NLS; 1 Ret	NLS; 2; 1	24H; Q1; 2	24H; Q2; 4	NLS; 3 Ret	NLS; 4; 1	NLS; 5; 1	NLS; 6			NC†	—
2025	(Germany) Team Bilstein by Black Falcon	(United Kingdom) Jimmy Broadbent (Netherlands) Misha Charoudin (Germany) Manuel Metzger	BMW M4 GT4 Evo	SP8T	NLS; 1; 1	NLS; 2; 2	NLS; 3; 2	24H; Q1; 2	24H; Q2; 2	NLS; 6; 2	NLS; 7	NLS; 8	NLS; 9	NLS; 10; 1	3rd	84
2026	(Germany) Black Falcon Team Fanatec	(United Kingdom) Jimmy Broadbent (Netherlands) Misha Charoudin (Germany) Manuel Metzger	Porsche 992 GT3 Cup	AT2	NLS; 1 C	NLS; 2; 1	NLS; 3; 1	24H; Q1; C	24H; Q2; 1	NLS; 6	NLS; 7	NLS; 8	NLS; 9	NLS; 10	1st*	8*

^{†} As Alvarez Brown was a guest driver, he was ineligible for championship points.
* Season still in progress.

=== Nürburgring 24 Hours results ===
Year	Entrant	Co-Driver(s)	Car	Class	Laps	Pos.	Class Pos.
2025	(Germany) Team Bilstein by Black Falcon	(United Kingdom) Jimmy Broadbent (Netherlands) Misha Charoudin (Germany) Manuel Metzger	BMW M4 GT4 Evo	SP8T	130	21st	2nd
2026	(Germany) Black Falcon Team Fanatec	(United Kingdom) Jimmy Broadbent (Netherlands) Misha Charoudin (Germany) Manuel Metzger	Porsche 992 GT3 Cup	AT2	70	DNF	DNF
