= Cambridge University Automobile Club =

Member and alumni club at University of Cambridge

The Cambridge University Automobile Club or CUAC is a motor club for members and alumni of the University of Cambridge. It is recognised by the Motor Sports Association (MSA, previously RACMSA). CUAC is also a member club of the London Counties Association of Motor Clubs (LCAMC) and the Association of Eastern Motor Clubs (EAMC).

== History ==
The Cambridge University Automobile Club was founded in 1902. It is said to be the second oldest British car club still in existence (with the Royal Automobile Club, founded in 1897, being the oldest). Certainly, for many years it has been the second oldest club recognised by the MSA as engaged in motor sport.

In 1946 the club organised the first motor race in Britain after the end of the World War II at nearby Gransden Lodge airfield.

Its members have competed in speed trials, rallies, economy runs and kart races.

In 1983 members of CUAC contested a fuel economy run in Austin Maestros against members of the Oxford University Motor Drivers Club (Oumdc).

== Membership ==
Any member of the university can become a member of CUAC. Membership gives discounts on attending most CUAC events, and is required to represent the University.

== Activities ==
=== Weekly meetings ===
The CUAC committee meet at various pubs in Cambridge on Sundays during the university’s term time (and occasionally outside of term time).

=== Rallying ===
CUAC has in the past run several road rallies involving navigating from checkpoint to checkpoint on public roads within a time limit. The onus of the competition is on decoding the navigation clues as quickly as possible, rather than fast driving.

Previous annual rallies have included the Mindwarp and the Ariel. CUAC and the Oxford University Motor Drivers Club (Oumdc) have also taken turns at organising a Varsity rally between the two universities. Unfortunately, economic and university pressures have in recent years kept regular CUAC races confined to kart circuits.

==== Notable Rallies ====
The 1996-7 CUAC Karting Championship was jointly won by two drivers: Steve Brumpton and Carolyn Pursell.

The 2001 CUAC Mindwarp Rally was cancelled due to the ongoing foot and mouth crisis.

=== Karting ===
CUAC runs its own series of karting races, collectively known as the CUAC Karting Championship, and sends a team representing the University of Cambridge to the British Universities Karting Championship.

CUAC and the Oxford University Motor Drivers Club (OUMDC) take turns at organising the Varsity Kart Race between the two universities. The 2019 varsity race was won by Cambridge University. The 2020 and 2021 races were cancelled due to the COVID-19 Pandemic.

==== CUAC Karting championship ====
The number of rounds in the CUAC Karting Championship tends to vary from year to year with demand.

Races take place most frequently at the nearby Red Lodge and Rye House circuits, but there have also been visits to Whilton Mill (Daventry), Daytona (Milton Keynes) and Buckmore Park (Kent).

Inter-college 'cuppers' races are also organised each year.

==== British Universities Karting Championship ====
CUAC enter the University of Cambridge team in the British Universities Karting Championship.

=== Annual events ===
CUAC’s annual events include attending the Cambridge University Students' Union’s Societies Fair, a Freshers’ Squash for new members and an Annual Dinner usually held in Easter Term.
