= Club100 =

Kart racing championship in the United Kingdom

(United Kingdom) Club100
- Category: Kart racing
- Country: United Kingdom
- Affiliations: Rotax Racing Club; Motorsport UK
- Inaugural season: 1993; 33 years ago
- Chassis suppliers: Birel ART
- Engine suppliers: Rotax
- Tyre suppliers: Dunlop
- Official website: club100.co.uk

Club100 is a UK-based "hire kart" karting championship. Senior/Junior karts use identical BirelART chassis, Rotax Junior Max 2 stroke engines and Dunlop KE1 tyres, while the Cadet championship use a smaller BirelART chassis, a smaller Rotax Micro Max 2 stroke engine and Dunlop SL3 tyres, these are provided by the club to an equal standard, putting all competitors on a level playing field.

== History ==
Club100 was established in Streatham, London, in 1993 by Martin Howell—the founder of the first indoor kart circuit—and John Vigor. It began as a six-round series at Buckmore Park. For 2019, Club100 replaced their fleet of TKM karts with Rotax karts, utilising their "Evo" technology and ending a 26-year tenure of Club100 using TKM machinery. Initially a senior and junior series, it launched a cadet championship under Vigor's management in 2021. By 2023, Club100 was the largest karting competition in the world. Club100 became a member of Motorsport UK (MSUK) in 2020, the Association of British Kart Clubs (ABkC) in 2021, and a founding member of the Rotax Racing Club (RRC) in 2026, which was founded to "replicate [the success of Club100] worldwide". It organised the inaugural RRC International Finals at Silverstone in 2026, which was described by Fabio Marangon of Vroomkart as "an organisation worthy of a World Championship".

== Spin-off series ==
- BPKDC Elite Series (2009–2015)
- British Universities Karting Championship (2001–present)
- Advance Leisure (2003–present)
- Spiros 60 (2009–2013)
- UK Challenge (2002–2005)
- City Challenge (2004)
- Nationwide Series (2014–present)

Club100 have also been the promoters of the UK Easykart championship since its inception in 2007.

== Notable drivers ==
- Damon Hill 1996 Formula 1 World Champion
- James Winslow 2008 Australian Formula 3 Champion
- Trevor Fowell, 2008 Caterham Academy Champion; 2009 Caterham Roadsport-B Champion; 2010 Caterham Superlight R300 Champion.
