= Tom Fleming (racing driver) =

British racing driver (born 2002)

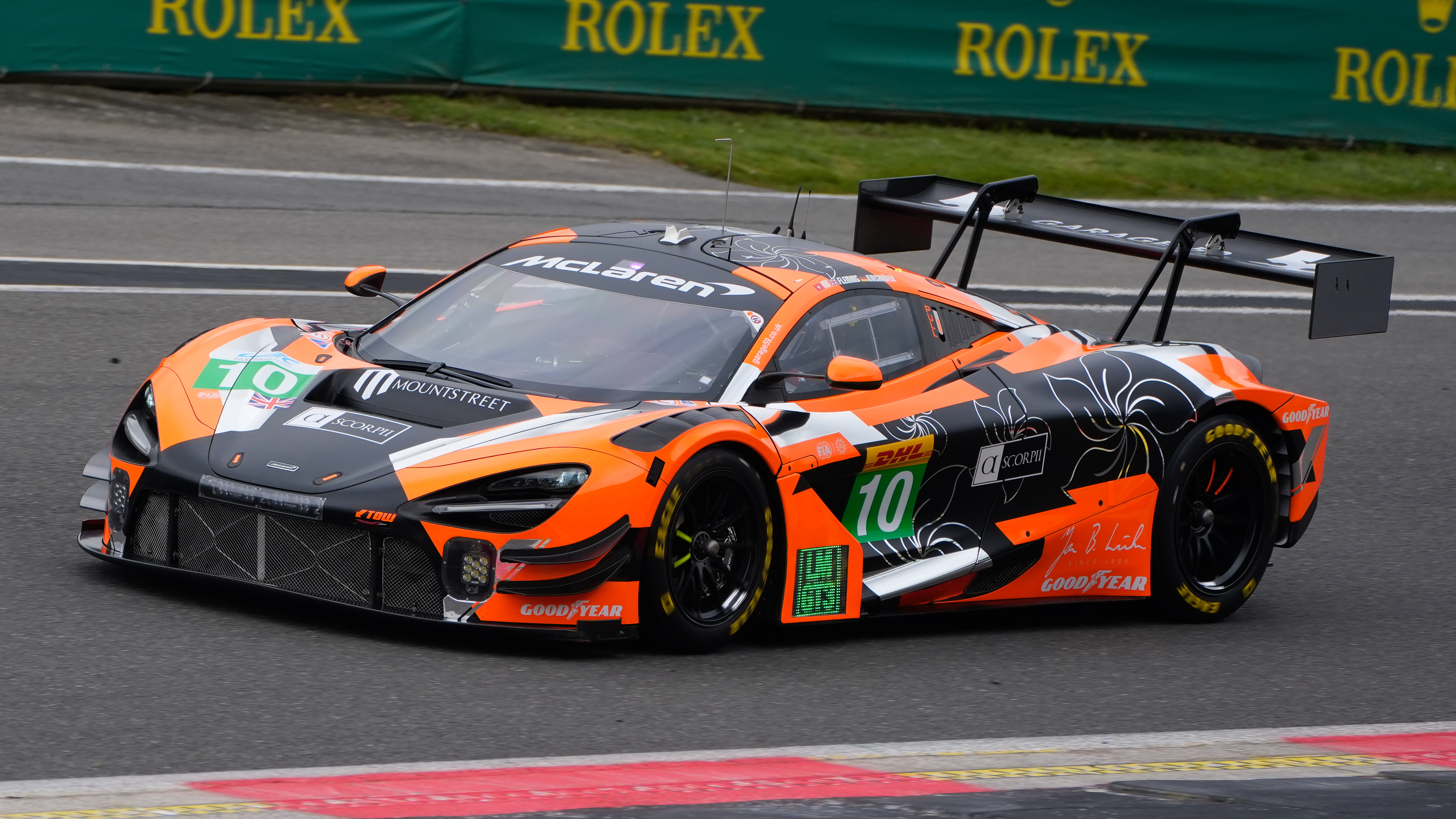
- Fleming in 2026
- Nationality: (United Kingdom) British
- Born: Thomas Fleming; 20 September 2002 (age 24) Hatfield Broad Oak, Essex, England

FIA World Endurance Championship career
- Debut season: 2026
- Current team: Garage 59
- Categorisation: FIA Silver (2023–2026); FIA Gold (2027–)
- Car number: 10
- Starts: 8
- Wins: 1
- Podiums: 2
- Poles: 2
- Fastest laps: 0
- Best finish: 12th in 2026

Championship titles
- 2026 2023: GT World Challenge Europe – Gold; Ferrari Challenge Finali Mondiali – Trofeo Pirelli

Thomas Fleming (born 20 September 2002) is a British racing driver who last competed in GT World Challenge Europe and the LMGT3 class of the FIA World Endurance Championship for Garage 59.

== Early career ==
Fleming started his professional karting career in 2018. Finishing third in the X30 Junior standings of the LGM Series in the same year for BMR, Fleming joined Dan Holland Racing during 2020, with whom he stayed with throughout the rest of his karting career. With Dan Holland Racing, Fleming finished third in the 2021 British Karting Championship and the 2022 LGM Series in X30 Junior, and also finished runner-up in the 2022 Kartmasters British GP to Kai Hunter in Rotax Senior. Whilst studying at the University of Reading, Fleming participated in the premier class of British University Kart Championship representing his university in the "Reading A" team. In his second season, he was able to win the BUKC championship in the 2023–24 season, the first in the university's history.

Stepping up to car racing in 2023, Fleming joined FF Corse to compete in Ferrari Challenge Europe. Finishing second from last on the grid to Eliseo Donno on debut at Valencia, Fleming won both races at Misano, but was disqualified from race two for failing post-race inspection. After standing on the podium once in the following two rounds, Fleming won both races at Estoril to put himself 23 points behind Donno with two rounds left. In the final two rounds of the season, Fleming won twice at both Spa and Mugello to finish the season runner-up to Donno by 12 points. At the end of the year, Fleming took part in the Ferrari Challenge Finali Mondiali at Mugello, in which he was able to hold off Donno to take the Trofeo Pirelli title.

== GT3 career ==
In early 2024 it was announced that Fleming would pair up with Ferrari Challenge rival Eliseo Donno at AF Corse for the 2024 GT World Challenge Europe Sprint Cup. In the opening round of the season at Brands Hatch, the pair finished third among the Silvers in race one. In race two, Fleming earned his first class win by finishing 11th. In the following round at Misano, Fleming suffered a massive crash in free practice, which meant neither he nor Donno would race in that weekend. At the Hockenheimring, Fleming took his second class win of the season by finishing fourth overall in race one, while in race two he finished 21st after being given a penalty for exceeding track limits. After scoring a third class win, at the penultimate round of the season, Fleming ended the season fourth in the Silver category and 13th overall in the Drivers' standings.

Fleming remained in GT3 competition in 2025, racing in the European Le Mans Series in GR Racing's Ferrari 296 GT3, and the GT World Challenge Europe Endurance Cup in Garage 59's McLaren 720S GT3 Evo. In the former, Fleming scored podiums at Le Castellet and Silverstone to end the year seventh in the LMGT3 points, and for his performances in the series, Fleming was selected for the WEC rookie test, giving him the opportunity to sample the championship winning car from 2025. During 2025, Fleming also made a one-off appearance in International GT Open, driving for Garage 59 at the Hockenheimring round alongside Marvin Kirchhöfer. The duo won both races from pole. Fleming also raced in the last three rounds of the GT World Challenge Europe Sprint Cup for the same team, scoring three Gold Cup wins which included an overall podium at Valencia to end the year sixth in the class standings.

Staying with Garage 59 for 2026, Fleming raced with them in the FIA World Endurance Championship, as well as a campaign in both the GT World Challenge Europe Endurance and Sprint Cups. In the WEC, Fleming qualified on pole on debut at the 6 Hours of Imola, before winning the 6 Hours of Spa-Francorchamps and finishing second at the 6 Hours of Barcelona from pole to end the year 12th in points. In the Endurance Cup, Fleming took a class win at Le Castellet and another podium to secure third in points, whereas in the Sprint Cup, he took a lone overall win at Zandvoort from pole and four other class podiums to end the season third in class. During 2026, Fleming secured the Gold cup title in GT World Challenge Europe and also finished second overall at the Indianapolis 8 Hour for McLaren customer team Archangel Motorsports. At the end of the year, Fleming continued with Garage 59 to race in the GT3 class of the 2026–27 Asian Le Mans Series.

== Prototype career ==
Having sampled LMP2 machinery for Nielsen Racing in the 2024 European Le Mans Series rookie tests at Algarve, Fleming joined the team for the following year, racing in the LMP3 class of the Michelin Le Mans Cup alongside Colin Noble in an ADESS AD25.

== Karting record ==
=== Karting career summary ===
Season	Series	Team	Position
2018	IAME Euro Series – X30 Senior	BMR	33rd
2018	IAME International Final – X30 Senior	BMR	NC
2018	LGM Series – X30 Junior		3rd
2019	British Kart Championship – X30 Senior	BMR	44th
2019	LGM Series – X30 Senior	BMR	3rd
2019	Kartmasters British GP – X30 Senior	BMR	11th
2019	IAME Euro Series – X30 Senior	Xenon	25th
2019	IAME International Final – X30 Senior		NC
2020	IAME Winter Cup – X30 Senior	BMR	NC
2020	IAME Euro Series – X30 Senior (Note: Fleming competed for BMR in Round 1 and ran as a Privateer in round 2.)	BMR	14th
2020	IAME International Games – X30 Senior	Dan Holland Racing	6th
2021	IAME Winter Cup – X30 Senior	Dan Holland Racing	11th
2021	IAME Euro Series – X30 Senior	Dan Holland Racing	25th
2021	British Kart Championship – X30 Senior	Dan Holland Racing	3rd
2021	IAME Warriors Final – X30 Senior	Dan Holland Racing	17th
2021	IAME International Games – X30 Senior	Dan Holland Racing	30th
2022	IAME Winter Cup – X30 Senior	Dan Holland Racing	31st
2022	Rotax Winter Cup – Rotax Senior	Dan Holland Racing	12th
2022	IAME Euro Series – X30 Senior	Dan Holland Racing	32nd
2022	British Kart Championship – X30 Senior	Dan Holland Racing	5th
2022	LGM Series – X30 Senior	Dan Holland Racing	3rd
2022	Kartmasters British GP – Rotax Senior	Dan Holland Racing	2nd
2022	Kartmasters British GP – X30 Senior	Dan Holland Racing	26th
2023	British Universities Championship – Premier	Reading A	13th
2024	British Universities Championship – Premier	Reading A	1st

== Racing record ==
=== Racing career summary ===
Season	Series	Team	Races	Wins	Poles	F/Laps	Podiums	Points	Position
2023	Ferrari Challenge Europe – Trofeo Pirelli	HR Owen – FF Corse	13	5	4	4	9	160	**2nd**
2023	Ferrari Challenge Finali Mondiali – Trofeo Pirelli	HR Owen – FF Corse	1	1	1	1	1	—N/a	**1st**
2023	GT Cup Championship – GTC	FF Corse	4	1	2	2	3	0	NC
2024	GT World Challenge Europe Sprint Cup – Silver	AF Corse	8	3	2	2	4	80	4th
2024	Ferrari Challenge UK – Trofeo Pirelli	HR Owen	2	2	2	2	2	35	5th
2025	European Le Mans Series – LMGT3	GR Racing	6	0	0	0	2	44	8th
2025	Le Mans Cup – LMP3	Nielsen Racing	7	0	0	0	0	0	22nd
2025	GT World Challenge Europe Endurance Cup	Garage 59	5	0	0	0	0	0	NC
2025	GT World Challenge Europe Endurance Cup – Bronze	Garage 59	3	0	2	0	1	34	11th
2025	GT World Challenge Europe Endurance Cup – Silver	Garage 59	2	0	2	0	1	21	19th
2025	GT World Challenge Europe Sprint Cup	Garage 59	6	0	0	0	1	17	11th
2025	GT World Challenge Europe Sprint Cup – Gold	Garage 59	6	3	2	1	5	80.5	6th
2025	International GT Open	Garage 59	2	2	2	1	2	30	11th
2025–26	24H Series Middle East - GT3	Optimum Motorsport	1	0	0	0	0	0	NC
2026	Nürburgring Langstrecken-Serie – VT2-RWD	SRS Team Sorg Rennsport	1	1	0	1	1	15	NC
2026	FIA World Endurance Championship – LMGT3	Garage 59	8	1	2	0	2	57	12th
2026	GT World Challenge Europe Endurance Cup	Garage 59	5	0	0	0	1	32	7th
2026	GT World Challenge Europe Endurance Cup – Gold	Garage 59	5	1	3	2	2	86	**3rd**
2026	GT World Challenge Europe Sprint Cup	Garage 59	10	1	0	1	1	19.5	15th
2026	GT World Challenge Europe Sprint Cup – Gold	Garage 59	10	1	2	2	5	83.5	**3rd**
2026	GT World Challenge America – Pro-Am	Archangel Motorsports	1	0	0	0	1	0	NC†
2026–27	Asian Le Mans Series – GT3	Garage 59						*	*

† As Fleming was a guest driver, he was ineligible for championship points.
^{*} Season still in progress.

=== Complete GT World Challenge Europe results ===
==== GT World Challenge Europe Sprint Cup ====
(key) (Races in bold indicate pole position) (Races in italics indicate fastest lap)

Year	Team	Car	Class	1	2	3	4	5	6	7	8	9	10	Pos.	Points
2024	AF Corse	Ferrari 296 GT3	Silver	BRH; 1; 10	**BRH**; **2**; 11	MIS; 1 WD	MIS; 2 WD	**HOC**; **1**; 4	HOC; 2; 21	MAG; 1; 17	MAG; 2; 8	CAT; 1; 14	CAT; 2; 24	4th	80
2025	Garage 59	McLaren 720S GT3 Evo	Gold	BRH; 1	BRH; 2	ZAN; 1	ZAN; 2	MIS; 1; 10	MIS; 2; 19	MAG; 1; 6	MAG; 2; 12	**VAL**; **1**; 2	**VAL**; **2**; 15	6th	80.5
2026	Garage 59	McLaren 720S GT3 Evo	Gold	BRH; 1; 8	BRH; 2 Ret	MIS; 1; 12	MIS; 2; 9	MAG; 1; 12	MAG; 2; 16	**ZAN**; **1**; 1	**ZAN**; **2**; 25	CAT; 1; 24	CAT; 2; 35	3rd	83.5

==== GT World Challenge Europe Endurance Cup ====
(key) (Races in bold indicate pole position) (Races in italics indicate fastest lap)

Year	Team	Car	Class	1	2	3	4	5	6	7	Pos.	Points
2025	Garage 59	McLaren 720S GT3 Evo	Bronze	**LEC**; 54	**MNZ**; 17	SPA; 6H; 49	SPA; 12H; 22	SPA; 24H; 22			11th	34
2025	Garage 59	McLaren 720S GT3 Evo	Silver						**NÜR**; 18	**CAT**; 36	19th	21
2026	Garage 59	McLaren 720S GT3 Evo	Gold	**LEC**; 3	MNZ; 18	SPA; 6H; 4	SPA; 12H; 3	**SPA**; **24H**; 36	**NÜR**; Ret	ALG; DSQ	3rd	86

=== Complete Le Mans Cup results ===
(key) (Races in bold indicate pole position) (Races in italics indicate fastest lap)

Year	Entrant	Class	Chassis	1	2	3	4	5	6	7	Rank	Points
2025	Nielsen Racing	LMP3	ADESS AD25	CAT; 11	LEC; Ret	LMS; 1; 20	LMS; 2; 15	SPA; 13	SIL; Ret	ALG; 16	22nd	0

=== Complete European Le Mans Series results ===
(key) (Races in bold indicate pole position) (Races in italics indicate fastest lap)

Year	Entrant	Class	Chassis	Engine	1	2	3	4	5	6	Pos.	Points
2025	GR Racing	LMGT3	Ferrari 296 GT3	Ferrari F163CE 3.0 L Turbo V6	CAT; 8	LEC; 3	IMO; Ret	SPA; 7	SIL; 2	ALG; 10	8th	44

=== Complete International GT Open results ===
(key) (Races in bold indicate pole position) (Races in italics indicate fastest lap)

Year	Team	Car	Class	1	2	3	4	5	6	7	8	9	10	11	12	13	14	Pos.	Points
2025	Garage 59	McLaren 720S GT3 Evo	Pro	ALG; 1	ALG; 2	SPA	**HOC**; **1**; 1	**HOC**; **2**; 1	HUN; 1	HUN; 2	LEC; 1	LEC; 2	RBR; 1	RBR; 2	CAT; 1	CAT; 2	MNZ	11th	30

=== Complete FIA World Endurance Championship results ===
(key) (Races in bold indicate pole position) (Races in italics indicate fastest lap)

Year	Entrant	Class	Car	Engine	1	2	3	4	5	6	7	8	Rank	Points
2026	Garage 59	LMGT3	McLaren 720S GT3 Evo	McLaren M840T 4.0 L Turbo V8	**IMO**; 13	SPA; 1	LMS; 8	SÃO; 16	COA; 17	FUJ; 8	**CAT**; 2	MNZ; 13	12th	57

^{*} Season still in progress.

=== 24 Hours of Le Mans results ===
Year	Team	Co-Drivers	Car	Class	Laps	Pos.	Class Pos.
2026	(United Kingdom) Garage 59	(Hong Kong) Antares Au (Germany) Marvin Kirchhöfer	McLaren 720S GT3 Evo	LMGT3	332	44th	12th

=== Complete Asian Le Mans Series results ===
(key) (Races in bold indicate pole position) (Races in italics indicate fastest lap)

Year	Team	Class	Car	Engine	1	2	3	4	5	6	Pos.	Points
2026–27	Garage 59	GT	McLaren 720S GT3 Evo	McLaren M840T 4.0 L Turbo V8	LEC; 1; 18	LEC; 2; 1	JER; 1	JER; 2	ALG; 1	ALG; 2	3rd*	25*
