= 2026 6 Hours of Imola =

Endurance sportscar racing event

(Italy) 2026 6 Hours of Imola
Event information
- Round 1 of 8 in the 2026 FIA World Endurance Championship
- Date: 19 April 2026
- Location: Imola
- Venue: Autodromo Internazionale Enzo e Dino Ferrari
- Duration: 6 hours

Results
- Laps completed: 213
- Distance (km): 1045.61
- Distance (miles): 649.71
- Hypercar

Pole position
- Time: 1:30.127
- Team: (Italy) Ferrari AF Corse
- Drivers: (Italy) Antonio Giovinazzi

Winners
- Team: (Japan) Toyota Racing
- Drivers: (Switzerland) Sébastien Buemi (New Zealand) Brendon Hartley (Japan) Ryo Hirakawa
- LMGT3

Winners
- Team: (Belgium) Team WRT
- Drivers: (United Kingdom) Dan Harper (United States) Anthony McIntosh (Canada) Parker Thompson

The 2026 6 Hours of Imola was an endurance sportscar racing event, held between 17 and 19 April 2026, as the first of eight rounds of the 2026 FIA World Endurance Championship. It was the fourth running of the event, and the third consecutive running of the event as part of the World Endurance Championship.

== Background ==
The event was announced on 13 June 2025, during the 2025 24 Hours of Le Mans weekend. After the 2026 Qatar 1812 km was postponed until October due to the 2026 Iran war, the 6 Hours of Imola became the opening round of the season.

== Entry list ==
The entry list was published on 7 April 2026 and consisted of 35 entries across 2 categories – 17 in Hypercar and 18 in LMGT3. Alex Lynn was scheduled to drive the No. 12 Cadillac Hertz Team Jota entry but underwent an operation on his neck prior to the race for an "ongoing neck injury". Also absent from the Hypercar's entry list were Cadillac's Jack Aitken (No. 38), as well as BMW's Dries Vanthoor (No. 15) and Sheldon van der Linde (No. 20), due to driving duties at the IMSA's 2026 Grand Prix of Long Beach held at the same weekend. In the LMGT3 category, Aston Martin Academy graduate Kobe Pauwels made his debut in place of The Heart of Racing's Eduardo Barrichello (No. 23) due to similar clashing commitments, while Corvette TF Sport's Ben Keating (No. 33) was injured in a training accident and was replaced by Blake McDonald.

== Schedule ==
Date	Time (local: CEST)	Event
Friday, 17 April	10:15	Free Practice 1
Friday, 17 April	15:15	Free Practice 2
Saturday, 18 April	10:30	Free Practice 3
Saturday, 18 April	14:30	Qualifying - LMGT3
Saturday, 18 April	14:50	Hyperpole - LMGT3
Saturday, 18 April	15:10	Qualifying - Hypercar
Saturday, 18 April	15:30	Hyperpole - Hypercar
Sunday, 19 April	13:00	Race

== Practice ==
Three practice sessions were held before the event: two on Friday, and one on Saturday. The sessions on Friday morning and Friday afternoon lasted 90 minutes, and the session on Saturday morning lasted 60 minutes.

=== Practice 1 ===
Class	No.	Entrant	Driver	Time
Hypercar	83	(Italy) AF Corse	(Poland) Robert Kubica	1:31.739
LMGT3	34	Racing Team Turkey by TF	(Republic of Ireland) Charlie Eastwood	1:42.678

- Note: Only the fastest car in each class is shown.

=== Practice 2 ===
Class	No.	Entrant	Driver	Time
Hypercar	35	(France) Alpine Endurance Team	(France) Charles Milesi	1:30.898
LMGT3	23	(United States) Heart of Racing Team	(Belgium) Kobe Pauwels	1:42.081

- Note: Only the fastest car in each class is shown.

=== Practice 3 ===
Class	No.	Entrant	Driver	Time
Hypercar	50	(Italy) Ferrari AF Corse	(Italy) Antonio Fuoco	1:30.370
LMGT3	27	(United States) Heart of Racing Team	(Italy) Mattia Drudi	1:41.973

- Note: Only the fastest car in each class is shown.

== Qualifying ==
=== Qualifying results ===
Pole position winners in each class are marked in bold.

Pos.	Class	No.	Team	Qualifying	Hyperpole	Grid
1	**Hypercar**	**51**	**(Italy) Ferrari AF Corse**	**1:30.341**	**1:30.127**	1
2	Hypercar	8	(Japan) Toyota Racing	1:30.471	1:30.138	2
3	Hypercar	50	(Italy) Ferrari AF Corse	1:30.088	1:30.167	3
4	Hypercar	94	(France) Peugeot TotalEnergies	1:30.309	1:30.200	4
5	Hypercar	12	(United States) Cadillac Hertz Team Jota	1:30.644	1:30.419	5
6	Hypercar	7	(Japan) Toyota Racing	1:30.274	1:30.432	6
7	Hypercar	35	(France) Alpine Endurance Team	1:30.420	1:30.469	7
8	Hypercar	83	(Italy) AF Corse	1:30.215	1:30.508	8
9	Hypercar	20	(Belgium) BMW M Team WRT	1:30.576	1:30.618	9
10	Hypercar	15	(Belgium) BMW M Team WRT	1:30.640	1:30.801	10
11	Hypercar	36	(France) Alpine Endurance Team	1:30.682		11
12	Hypercar	007	(United Kingdom) Aston Martin THOR Team	1:30.806		12
13	Hypercar	38	(United States) Cadillac Hertz Team Jota	1:30.867		13
14	Hypercar	009	(United Kingdom) Aston Martin THOR Team	1:30.967		14
15	Hypercar	93	(France) Peugeot TotalEnergies	1:30.995		15
16	Hypercar	19	(South Korea) Genesis Magma Racing	1:31.258		16
17	Hypercar	17	(South Korea) Genesis Magma Racing	1:32.216		17
18	**LMGT3**	**10**	**(United Kingdom) Garage 59**	**1:43.038**	**1:41.181**	18
19	LMGT3	78	(France) Akkodis ASP Team	1:42.815	1:41.407	19
20	LMGT3	87	(France) Akkodis ASP Team	1:43.009	1:41.545	20
21	LMGT3	69	(Belgium) Team WRT	1:42.315	1:41.591	21
22	LMGT3	32	(Belgium) Team WRT	1:42.428	1:41.812	22
23	LMGT3	61	(Italy) Iron Lynx	1:42.810	1:42.092	23
24	LMGT3	21	(Italy) Vista AF Corse	1:42.940	1:42.230	24
25	LMGT3	91	(Germany) Manthey DK Engineering	1:43.081	1:42.265	25
26	LMGT3	88	(Germany) Proton Competition	1:42.912	1:42.435	26
27	LMGT3	34	Racing Team Turkey by TF	1:43.081	No time	27
28	LMGT3	92	(Germany) The Bend Manthey	1:43.093		28
29	LMGT3	27	(United States) Heart of Racing Team	1:43.106		29
30	LMGT3	77	(Germany) Proton Competition	1:43.241		30
31	LMGT3	33	(United Kingdom) TF Sport	1:43.281		31
32	LMGT3	23	(United States) Heart of Racing Team	1:43.336		32
33	LMGT3	58	(United Kingdom) Garage 59	1:43.364		33
34	LMGT3	79	(Italy) Iron Lynx	1:43.522		34
35	LMGT3	54	(Italy) Vista AF Corse	1:43.999		35

== Race ==
=== Race results ===
The minimum number of laps for classification (70% of overall winning car's distance) was 150 laps. Class winners are in bold and ‡.

Pos	Class	No.	Team	Drivers	Car	Tires	Laps	Time/Retired
Pos	Class	No.	Team	Drivers	Engine	Tires	Laps	Time/Retired
1	**Hypercar**	**8**	**(Japan) Toyota Racing**	**(Switzerland) Sébastien Buemi** **(New Zealand) Brendon Hartley** **(Japan) Ryo Hirakawa**	**Toyota TR010 Hybrid**	M	**213**	**6:00:34.717‡**
1	**Hypercar**	**8**	**(Japan) Toyota Racing**	**(Switzerland) Sébastien Buemi** **(New Zealand) Brendon Hartley** **(Japan) Ryo Hirakawa**	**Toyota H8909 3.5 L Turbo V6**	M	**213**	**6:00:34.717‡**
2	Hypercar	51	(Italy) Ferrari AF Corse	(United Kingdom) James Calado (Italy) Antonio Giovinazzi (Italy) Alessandro Pier Guidi	Ferrari 499P	M	213	+13.352
2	Hypercar	51	(Italy) Ferrari AF Corse	(United Kingdom) James Calado (Italy) Antonio Giovinazzi (Italy) Alessandro Pier Guidi	Ferrari F163CG 3.0 L Turbo V6	M	213	+13.352
3	Hypercar	7	(Japan) Toyota Racing	(United Kingdom) Mike Conway (Japan) Kamui Kobayashi (Netherlands) Nyck de Vries	Toyota TR010 Hybrid	M	213	+41.187
3	Hypercar	7	(Japan) Toyota Racing	(United Kingdom) Mike Conway (Japan) Kamui Kobayashi (Netherlands) Nyck de Vries	Toyota H8909 3.5 L Turbo V6	M	213	+41.187
4	Hypercar	35	(France) Alpine Endurance Team	(Portugal) António Félix da Costa (Austria) Ferdinand Habsburg (France) Charles Milesi	Alpine A424	M	213	+59.385
4	Hypercar	35	(France) Alpine Endurance Team	(Portugal) António Félix da Costa (Austria) Ferdinand Habsburg (France) Charles Milesi	Alpine V634 3.4 L Turbo V6	M	213	+59.385
5	Hypercar	20	(Belgium) BMW M Team WRT	(Netherlands) Robin Frijns (Germany) René Rast	BMW M Hybrid V8	M	213	+1:00.543
5	Hypercar	20	(Belgium) BMW M Team WRT	(Netherlands) Robin Frijns (Germany) René Rast	BMW P66/3 4.0 L Turbo V8	M	213	+1:00.543
6	Hypercar	50	(Italy) Ferrari AF Corse	(Italy) Antonio Fuoco (Spain) Miguel Molina (Denmark) Nicklas Nielsen	Ferrari 499P	M	213	+1:00.901
6	Hypercar	50	(Italy) Ferrari AF Corse	(Italy) Antonio Fuoco (Spain) Miguel Molina (Denmark) Nicklas Nielsen	Ferrari F163CG 3.0 L Turbo V6	M	213	+1:00.901
7	Hypercar	15	(Belgium) BMW M Team WRT	(Denmark) Kevin Magnussen (Switzerland) Raffaele Marciello	BMW M Hybrid V8	M	213	+1:01.506
7	Hypercar	15	(Belgium) BMW M Team WRT	(Denmark) Kevin Magnussen (Switzerland) Raffaele Marciello	BMW P66/3 4.0 L Turbo V8	M	213	+1:01.506
8	Hypercar	38	(United States) Cadillac Hertz Team JOTA	(New Zealand) Earl Bamber (France) Sébastien Bourdais	Cadillac V-Series.R	M	213	+1:01.995
8	Hypercar	38	(United States) Cadillac Hertz Team JOTA	(New Zealand) Earl Bamber (France) Sébastien Bourdais	Cadillac LMC55R 5.5 L V8	M	213	+1:01.995
9	Hypercar	007	(United Kingdom) Aston Martin THOR Team	(United Kingdom) Tom Gamble (United Kingdom) Harry Tincknell	Aston Martin Valkyrie	M	212	+1 Lap
9	Hypercar	007	(United Kingdom) Aston Martin THOR Team	(United Kingdom) Tom Gamble (United Kingdom) Harry Tincknell	Aston Martin RA 6.5 L V12	M	212	+1 Lap
10	Hypercar	83	(Italy) AF Corse	(United Kingdom) Philip Hanson (Poland) Robert Kubica (China) Yifei Ye	Ferrari 499P	M	212	+1 Lap
10	Hypercar	83	(Italy) AF Corse	(United Kingdom) Philip Hanson (Poland) Robert Kubica (China) Yifei Ye	Ferrari F163CG 3.0 L Turbo V6	M	212	+1 Lap
11	Hypercar	36	(France) Alpine Endurance Team	(France) Jules Gounon (France) Frédéric Makowiecki (France) Victor Martins	Alpine A424	M	212	+1 Lap
11	Hypercar	36	(France) Alpine Endurance Team	(France) Jules Gounon (France) Frédéric Makowiecki (France) Victor Martins	Alpine V634 3.4 L Turbo V6	M	212	+1 Lap
12	Hypercar	94	(France) Peugeot TotalEnergies	(France) Loïc Duval (Denmark) Malthe Jakobsen (France) Théo Pourchaire	Peugeot 9X8	M	212	+1 Lap
12	Hypercar	94	(France) Peugeot TotalEnergies	(France) Loïc Duval (Denmark) Malthe Jakobsen (France) Théo Pourchaire	Peugeot X6H 2.6 L Turbo V6	M	212	+1 Lap
13	Hypercar	12	(United States) Cadillac Hertz Team JOTA	(France) Norman Nato (United Kingdom) Will Stevens	Cadillac V-Series.R	M	212	+1 Lap
13	Hypercar	12	(United States) Cadillac Hertz Team JOTA	(France) Norman Nato (United Kingdom) Will Stevens	Cadillac LMC55R 5.5 L V8	M	212	+1 Lap
14	Hypercar	009	(United Kingdom) Aston Martin THOR Team	(Spain) Alex Riberas (Denmark) Marco Sørensen	Aston Martin Valkyrie	M	212	+1 Lap
14	Hypercar	009	(United Kingdom) Aston Martin THOR Team	(Spain) Alex Riberas (Denmark) Marco Sørensen	Aston Martin RA 6.5 L V12	M	212	+1 Lap
15	Hypercar	17	(South Korea) Genesis Magma Racing	(Brazil) Pipo Derani (France) Mathys Jaubert (Germany) André Lotterer	Genesis GMR-001	M	211	+2 Laps
15	Hypercar	17	(South Korea) Genesis Magma Racing	(Brazil) Pipo Derani (France) Mathys Jaubert (Germany) André Lotterer	Genesis G8MR 3.2 L Turbo V8	M	211	+2 Laps
16	Hypercar	93	(France) Peugeot TotalEnergies	(New Zealand) Nick Cassidy (United Kingdom) Paul di Resta (Belgium) Stoffel Vandoorne	Peugeot 9X8	M	210	+3 Laps
16	Hypercar	93	(France) Peugeot TotalEnergies	(New Zealand) Nick Cassidy (United Kingdom) Paul di Resta (Belgium) Stoffel Vandoorne	Peugeot X6H 2.6 L Turbo V6	M	210	+3 Laps
17	**LMGT3**	**69**	**(Belgium) Team WRT**	**(United Kingdom) Dan Harper** **(United States) Anthony McIntosh** **(Canada) Parker Thompson**	**BMW M4 GT3 Evo**	G	**194**	**+19 Laps‡**
17	**LMGT3**	**69**	**(Belgium) Team WRT**	**(United Kingdom) Dan Harper** **(United States) Anthony McIntosh** **(Canada) Parker Thompson**	**BMW P58 3.0 L Turbo I6**	G	**194**	**+19 Laps‡**
18	LMGT3	33	(United Kingdom) TF Sport	(Netherlands) Nicky Catsburg (United Kingdom) Jonny Edgar (United States) Blake McDonald	Chevrolet Corvette Z06 GT3.R	G	194	+19 Laps
18	LMGT3	33	(United Kingdom) TF Sport	(Netherlands) Nicky Catsburg (United Kingdom) Jonny Edgar (United States) Blake McDonald	Chevrolet LT6.R 5.5 L V8	G	194	+19 Laps
19	LMGT3	92	(Germany) The Bend Manthey	(Austria) Richard Lietz (Italy) Riccardo Pera (Australia) Yasser Shahin	Porsche 911 GT3 R (992.2)	G	193	+20 Laps
19	LMGT3	92	(Germany) The Bend Manthey	(Austria) Richard Lietz (Italy) Riccardo Pera (Australia) Yasser Shahin	Porsche M97/80 4.2 L Flat-6	G	193	+20 Laps
20	LMGT3	91	(Germany) Manthey DK Engineering	Timur Boguslavskiy (United Kingdom) James Cottingham (Turkey) Ayhancan Güven	Porsche 911 GT3 R (992.2)	G	193	+20 Laps
20	LMGT3	91	(Germany) Manthey DK Engineering	Timur Boguslavskiy (United Kingdom) James Cottingham (Turkey) Ayhancan Güven	Porsche M97/80 4.2 L Flat-6	G	193	+20 Laps
21	LMGT3	32	(Belgium) Team WRT	(Brazil) Augusto Farfus (Indonesia) Sean Gelael (United Kingdom) Darren Leung	BMW M4 GT3 Evo	G	193	+20 Laps
21	LMGT3	32	(Belgium) Team WRT	(Brazil) Augusto Farfus (Indonesia) Sean Gelael (United Kingdom) Darren Leung	BMW P58 3.0 L Turbo I6	G	193	+20 Laps
22	LMGT3	21	(Italy) Vista AF Corse	(France) François Hériau (United States) Simon Mann (Italy) Alessio Rovera	Ferrari 296 GT3 Evo	G	193	+20 Laps
22	LMGT3	21	(Italy) Vista AF Corse	(France) François Hériau (United States) Simon Mann (Italy) Alessio Rovera	Ferrari F163CE 3.0 L Turbo V6	G	193	+20 Laps
23	LMGT3	58	(United Kingdom) Garage 59	(Germany) Finn Gehrsitz (Germany) Benjamin Goethe (Sweden) Alexander West	McLaren 720S GT3 Evo	G	193	+20 Laps
23	LMGT3	58	(United Kingdom) Garage 59	(Germany) Finn Gehrsitz (Germany) Benjamin Goethe (Sweden) Alexander West	McLaren M840T 4.0 L Turbo V8	G	193	+20 Laps
24	LMGT3	88	(Germany) Proton Competition	(Italy) Stefano Gattuso (Italy) Giammarco Levorato (United States) Logan Sargeant	Ford Mustang GT3 Evo	G	193	+20 Laps
24	LMGT3	88	(Germany) Proton Competition	(Italy) Stefano Gattuso (Italy) Giammarco Levorato (United States) Logan Sargeant	Ford Coyote 5.4 L V8	G	193	+20 Laps
25	LMGT3	23	(United States) Heart of Racing Team	(United Kingdom) Jonny Adam (United States) Gray Newell (Belgium) Kobe Pauwels	Aston Martin Vantage AMR GT3 Evo	G	193	+20 Laps
25	LMGT3	23	(United States) Heart of Racing Team	(United Kingdom) Jonny Adam (United States) Gray Newell (Belgium) Kobe Pauwels	Aston Martin M177 4.0 L Turbo V8	G	193	+20 Laps
26	LMGT3	77	(Germany) Proton Competition	(United States) Eric Powell (United Kingdom) Sebastian Priaulx (United Kingdom) Ben Tuck	Ford Mustang GT3 Evo	G	193	+20 Laps
26	LMGT3	77	(Germany) Proton Competition	(United States) Eric Powell (United Kingdom) Sebastian Priaulx (United Kingdom) Ben Tuck	Ford Coyote 5.4 L V8	G	193	+20 Laps
27	LMGT3	54	(Italy) Vista AF Corse	(Italy) Francesco Castellacci (Switzerland) Thomas Flohr (Italy) Davide Rigon	Ferrari 296 GT3 Evo	G	192	+21 Laps
27	LMGT3	54	(Italy) Vista AF Corse	(Italy) Francesco Castellacci (Switzerland) Thomas Flohr (Italy) Davide Rigon	Ferrari F163CE 3.0 L Turbo V6	G	192	+21 Laps
28	LMGT3	79	(Italy) Iron Lynx	(Italy) Matteo Cressoni (Netherlands) Lin Hodenius (Italy) Johannes Zelger	Mercedes-AMG GT3 Evo	G	192	+21 Laps
28	LMGT3	79	(Italy) Iron Lynx	(Italy) Matteo Cressoni (Netherlands) Lin Hodenius (Italy) Johannes Zelger	Mercedes-AMG M159 6.2 L V8	G	192	+21 Laps
29	Hypercar	19	(South Korea) Genesis Magma Racing	(France) Paul-Loup Chatin (France) Mathieu Jaminet (Spain) Daniel Juncadella	Genesis GMR-001	M	189	+24 Laps
29	Hypercar	19	(South Korea) Genesis Magma Racing	(France) Paul-Loup Chatin (France) Mathieu Jaminet (Spain) Daniel Juncadella	Genesis G8MR 3.2 L Turbo V8	M	189	+24 Laps
30	LMGT3	10	(United Kingdom) Garage 59	(Hong Kong) Antares Au (United Kingdom) Tom Fleming (Germany) Marvin Kirchhöfer	McLaren 720S GT3 Evo	G	179	+34 Laps
30	LMGT3	10	(United Kingdom) Garage 59	(Hong Kong) Antares Au (United Kingdom) Tom Fleming (Germany) Marvin Kirchhöfer	McLaren M840T 4.0 L Turbo V8	G	179	+34 Laps
31	LMGT3	78	(France) Akkodis ASP Team	(France) Hadrien David (France) Esteban Masson (Belgium) Tom Van Rompuy	Lexus RC F GT3	G	171	+42 Laps
31	LMGT3	78	(France) Akkodis ASP Team	(France) Hadrien David (France) Esteban Masson (Belgium) Tom Van Rompuy	Lexus 2UR-GSE 5.4 L V8	G	171	+42 Laps
Ret	LMGT3	61	(Italy) Iron Lynx	(Angola) Rui Andrade (Australia) Martin Berry (Belgium) Maxime Martin	Mercedes-AMG GT3 Evo	G	166	Power loss
Ret	LMGT3	61	(Italy) Iron Lynx	(Angola) Rui Andrade (Australia) Martin Berry (Belgium) Maxime Martin	Mercedes-AMG M159 6.2 L V8	G	166	Power loss
Ret	LMGT3	34	Racing Team Turkey by TF	(Republic of Ireland) Peter Dempsey (Republic of Ireland) Charlie Eastwood (Turkey) Salih Yoluç	Chevrolet Corvette Z06 GT3.R	G	162	Electrical
Ret	LMGT3	34	Racing Team Turkey by TF	(Republic of Ireland) Peter Dempsey (Republic of Ireland) Charlie Eastwood (Turkey) Salih Yoluç	Chevrolet LT6.R 5.5 L V8	G	162	Electrical
Ret	LMGT3	27	(United States) Heart of Racing Team	(Italy) Mattia Drudi (United Kingdom) Ian James (Canada) Zacharie Robichon	Aston Martin Vantage AMR GT3 Evo	G	146	Suspension
Ret	LMGT3	27	(United States) Heart of Racing Team	(Italy) Mattia Drudi (United Kingdom) Ian James (Canada) Zacharie Robichon	Aston Martin M177 4.0 L Turbo V8	G	146	Suspension
Ret	LMGT3	87	(France) Akkodis ASP Team	(Argentina) José María López (Austria) Clemens Schmid (Romania) Răzvan Umbrărescu	Lexus RC F GT3	G	32	Transmission
Ret	LMGT3	87	(France) Akkodis ASP Team	(Argentina) José María López (Austria) Clemens Schmid (Romania) Răzvan Umbrărescu	Lexus 2UR-GSE 5.4 L V8	G	32	Transmission

== Championship standings after the race ==
=== Hypercar ===
==== Drivers ====
Pos	Driver	Points
1	(Switzerland) Sébastien Buemi (New Zealand) Brendon Hartley (Japan) Ryo Hirakawa	25
2	(Italy) Alessandro Pier Guidi (United Kingdom) James Calado (Italy) Antonio Giovinazzi	19
3	(United Kingdom) Mike Conway (Japan) Kamui Kobayashi (Netherlands) Nyck de Vries	15
4	(Portugal) António Félix da Costa (France) Charles Milesi (Austria) Ferdinand Habsburg	12
5	(Netherlands) Robin Frijns (Germany) René Rast	10

==== Teams ====
Pos	Team	Points
1	(Japan) #8 Toyota Racing	25
2	(Italy) #51 Ferrari AF Corse	19
3	(Japan) #7 Toyota Racing	15
4	(France) #35 Alpine Endurance Team	12
5	(Belgium) #20 BMW M Team WRT	10

==== Manufacturers ====
Pos	Manufacturer	Points
1	(Japan) Toyota	40
2	(Italy) Ferrari	27
3	(Germany) BMW	16
4	(France) Alpine	13
5	(United States) Cadillac	4

=== LMGT3 ===
==== Drivers ====
Pos	Driver	Points
1	(United States) Anthony McIntosh (Canada) Parker Thompson (United Kingdom) Daniel Harper	25
2	(United Kingdom) Dean MacDonald (United Kingdom) Jonny Edgar (Netherlands) Nicky Catsburg	18
3	(Australia) Yasser Shahin (Italy) Riccardo Pera (Austria) Richard Lietz	15
4	(United Kingdom) James Cottingham (Taiwan) Timur Boguslavskiy (Turkey) Ayhancan Güven	12
5	(United Kingdom) Darren Leung (Indonesia) Sean Gelael (Brazil) Augusto Farfus	10

==== Teams ====
Pos	Team	Points
1	(Belgium) #69 Team WRT	25
2	(United Kingdom) #33 TF Sport	18
3	(Germany) #92 The Bend Manthey	15
4	(Germany) #91 Manthey DK Engineering	12
5	(Belgium) #32 Team WRT	10

FIA World Endurance Championship
Previous race: none	2026 season	Next race: 6 Hours of Spa-Francorchamps
