= Llandow Circuit =

Motor racing track in Wales

Coordinates: 51°25′54″N 3°29′52″W

- Location: Llandow, Vale of Glamorgan, Wales
- Opened: 1963
- Major events: Track Days; Club Racing
- Length: 0.90 mi (1.45 km)

Llandow Circuit is a small motorsport circuit at Llandow, Vale of Glamorgan, 15 miles (24 km) south west of Cardiff, Wales, used mainly for testing sessions, track days, filming, photoshoots and event hire. Llandow Circuit also own and manage the adjacent karting circuit.

The lap record is held by Martin Jessopp at 41.4 seconds - set on September 16, 2009 on his Ducati 1198RS British Superbike. Jessopp wasn't aware of a record or that he was being timed, and his Ducati was still running long gearing for the North West 200 a week prior, where Jessopp hit 208 mph a top speed record. Monoposto Racing Club lap record was 00:36.0 set by Alan Baillie in his Viking Mk1A in 1974.

== History ==
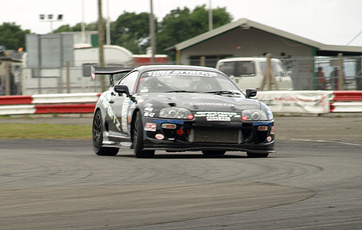
Toyota Supra being tested at Llandow, June 2009

Llandow Circuit began life as an airfield during World War II. RAF Llandow was home to Supermarine Spitfires and part of the Royal Canadian Air Force, but the Air Ministry decommissioned it in 1957.

In 1961 Jack Evans, a local farmer, bought an 80-acre (0.32 km^{2}) parcel which included air raid shelters, gun turrets and stretches of runway. With the help of the South Wales Automobile Club he linked the runways to form a 1-mile (1.6 km) oval track which was opened by Graham Hill in 1963. Car and motorbike events during the 1960s and 1970s drew crowds of 3,000–4,000, and competitors included Roger Clark, Jody Scheckter and Andy Rouse.

The circuit fell into disrepair, losing its track licence in 1977, thus in the 1980s, stock car racing, grass tracking and sheep grazing became more usual uses. A race and rally school, go-karting and general testing continued until the owners resurfaced and reshaped the track with a 30-foot (9 m)-wide strip of tarmac, enabling the Motor Sports Association Sprint license to be regained in 2001. The circuit is now a popular venue for track days. supercar experience days, MSUK testing sessions, track days, filming and photoshoots.

== Circuit details ==
- Length: 1.45 kilometres (0.9 mi)
- Width: 9 metres (30 ft)
- Noise Limitation: 105 dB
- Lap Record - 41.4 Seconds - Martin Jessopp - 2009 - Ducati 1198R

== Housing plan ==
In July 2007 Persimmon plc and Barratt Homes unveiled plans to replace the circuit with a new housing estate of 2,700 homes, two schools and a community centre, but as of 2022 this has not happened.
