= Misha Charoudin =

Dutch racing driver and YouTuber (born 1989)

- Nationality: (Netherlands) Dutch (Russia) Russian
- Born: Mikhail Grigorievitch Charoudin; 11 November 1989 (age 36) Moscow, Russian SFSR, Soviet Union

Nürburgring Langstrecken-Serie career
- Debut season: 2019
- Current team: Black Falcon Team Fanatec

YouTube information
- Channel: Misha Charoudin
- Years active: 2007–present
- Genres: Vlogging; auto racing
- Subscribers: 2.15 million
- Views: 1.08 billion
- Last updated: 30 May 2026

Mikhail Grigorievitch "Misha" Charoudin (born 11 November 1989) is a Russian-born Dutch YouTuber and racing driver mainly known for his videos driving around the Nürburgring Nordschleife.

Born in Moscow, Russia, raised in the Netherlands, and now based in Nürburg, Germany, Charoudin served as an instructor at the Nürburgring prior to becoming a content creator. He began regularly uploading vlogs in 2016, with an emphasis around driving in the Nürburgring Nordschleife, and rose to prominence as an expert at the circuit. He has previously stated driving upwards of a thousand laps per year on the layout.

Charoudin competes in the Nürburgring Langstrecken-Serie with Black Falcon Team Fanatec in the AT2 class, alongside fellow content creators Jimmy Broadbent and Steve Alvarez Brown, and 2016 24 Hours of Nürburgring overall winner Manuel Metzger, aboard a Porsche 911 GT3 Cup (992.1).

== Career ==
=== Nürburgring instruction and media ===
Charoudin worked as a Nürburgring instructor and became widely associated with Nordschleife driving content through his social-media channels.

In 2019, several automotive outlets highlighted a video in which Charoudin, blindfolded in the passenger seat, called out reference points and corners from memory during a fast lap of the Nordschleife.

=== Racing ===
Charoudin has competed in Nürburgring endurance racing, including events run on the Nordschleife. The official participants list for the 2025 24 Hours of Nürburgring includes “Charoudin, Mikhail (Niederlande)” as a driver for Team Bilstein by Black Falcon in a BMW M4 GT4 EVO.

Black Falcon has also reported on Charoudin's participation in Nürburgring Langstrecken-Serie (NLS) events, including appearances alongside other drivers in team race reports.

In 2024–2025, Charoudin also raced in the NXT Gen Cup, with the series describing him as a Nürburgring “expert” and noting his online following.

== See also ==
- Nürburgring
- Nürburgring Nordschleife
- Nürburgring Langstrecken-Serie
