= Rye House Kart Circuit =

Motorsport venue in Hoddesdon, England

Coordinates: 51.767588°N 0.011287°E

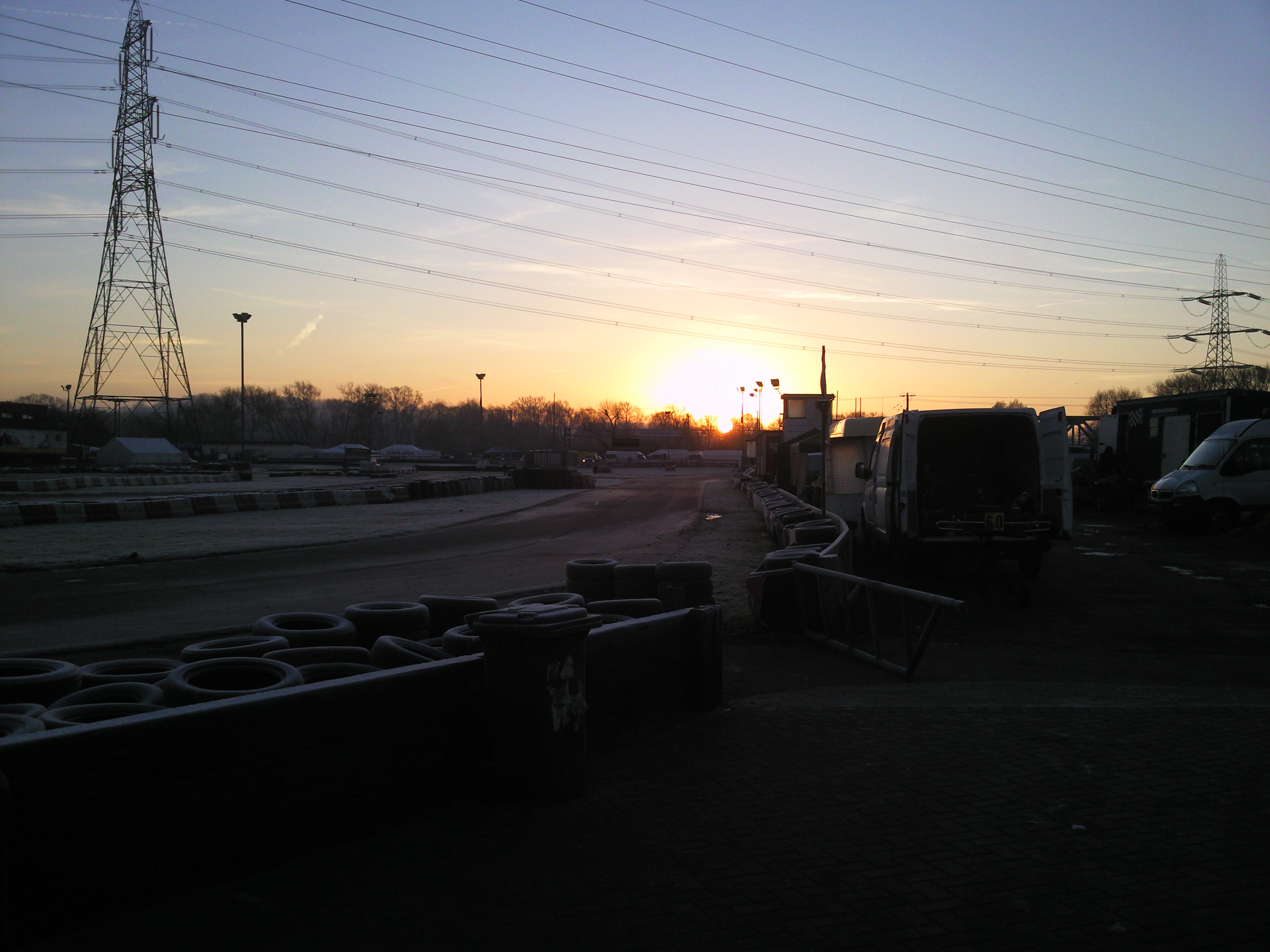
The circuit

Rye House Kart Circuit is a kart circuit, in Hoddesdon, Hertfordshire, England, and is adjacent to the Rye House Stadium. The circuit is one of the oldest in the country, and has been used by drivers including Jenson Button, Anthony Davidson and Lewis Hamilton .

== Hoddesdon Kart Club ==
The Hoddesdon Kart Club was an MSA approved club, which usually held its events on the third Sunday of every month from February to December. The club would run an annual event called the London Cup which has been televised on Motors TV in previous years. The event attracts competitors from the Super 1 National Kart Championships as well as other drivers from National kart clubs and associations.

== Rye House Kart Club ==
In 2017, Rye House took over the running of all competitive race meetings, as 'IKR' (independent kart racing) events, independently of the MSA. This continued until 2024 when Rye House Kart Club resumed running MSUK (formerly MSA) affiliated race meetings. The annual London Cup event continues to be run as the final event of the year, after the club championship has concluded.

== Circuit improvements ==
Since 2003, the circuit has undergone some major refurbishments. Early that year, the track was resurfaced, and since then a new cafe and hospitality area have been added. In between the March and April MSA meeting, a new covered grandstand was built at Stadium Bend, the fastest corner on the circuit. The grass on the exit of both hairpins one and two has been replaced with brickwork, in an effort to reduce the water-logging which plagues the circuit due to the close proximity of the wetlands and surrounding lakes and rivers. A new race control building was completed in late 2009.

The track was again resurfaced in early 2022. New drainage was added along with extended asphalt run off areas at the exits of turn 6 and 7.

In 2025 the track was given a new chicane on the pylon corner to divert around it for the national grid to make repairs on the pylon.

The chicane will also be used again from the 29th of May 2026. Along with the old part of the track skipping the pylon hairpin as the national grid plans to refurbish the whole pylon.

(Note: At some point the pylon hairpin was added in place of sharp right but date is unknown)

== History ==
Rye House Kart raceway was opened in the 1960s with it being one of the first purpose built karting circuits in the UK and it was a popular location as it was just a small distance away from the Rye House Stadium.

== In popular culture ==
The track featured prominently in the 1964 movie 'Go Kart Go' starring Dennis Waterman and Wilfrid Brambell.
