= Garage 59 =

British sports car racing team

(United Kingdom) Garage 59
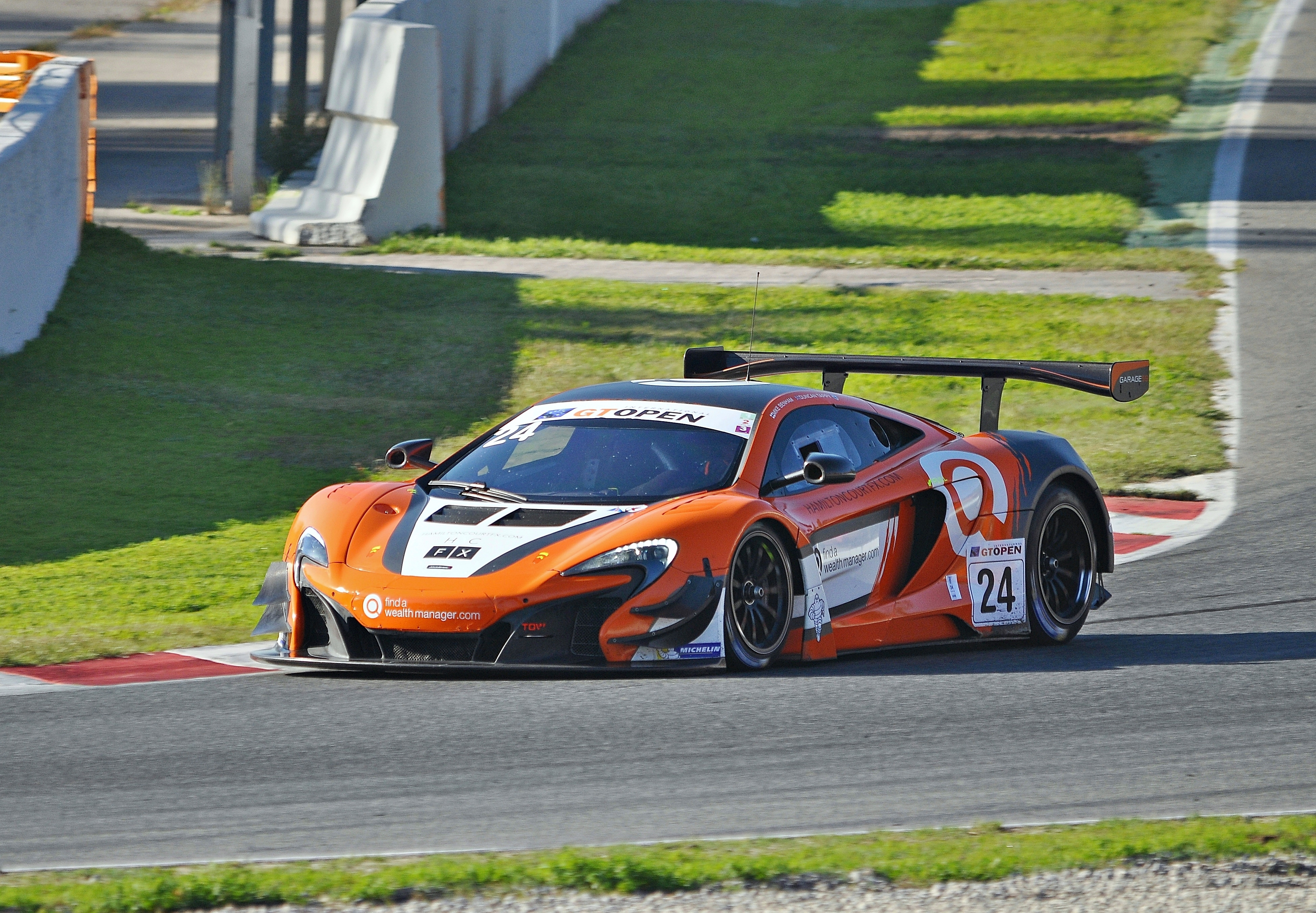
- Founded: 2016
- Founder(s): Chris Goodwin; Andrew Kirkaldy; Alexander West
- Base: Brackley, United Kingdom
- Team principal(s): Andrew Kirkaldy
- Current series: FIA World Endurance Championship; GT World Challenge Europe Endurance Cup; GT World Challenge Europe Sprint Cup
- Former series: Asian Le Mans Series; British GT Championship; International GT Open
- Current drivers: (Hong Kong) Antares Au (United Kingdom) Tom Fleming (Germany) Finn Gehrsitz (Germany) Benjamin Goethe (Germany) Marvin Kirchhöfer (Sweden) Alexander West
- Drivers' Championships: 5 (2016, 2020, 2022, 2023, 2024)
- Website: garage59.co.uk/

Garage 59 is a British sports car racing team that currently competes in the LMGT3 class in the FIA World Endurance Championship. The team was founded in 2016 as a revival of the CRS Racing operation to run McLaren 650S GT3 cars in the Blancpain GT Series. In its debut season, Garage 59 won both the drivers' and teams' championships with the #58 McLaren of Rob Bell, Côme Ledogar and Shane van Gisbergen in the Endurance Cup.

In 2019, Garage 59 switched brands to Aston Martin, the three-year partnership yielding third place at the 2021 24 Hours of Spa. It returned to McLaren in 2022, and scored three overall wins in the 2025 GT World Challenge Europe as well as Spa 24 Hours pole in the hands of Marvin Kirchhöfer. In 2026, Garage 59 was selected by McLaren as its LMGT3 partner in the FIA World Endurance Championship, taking over from United Autosports. After losing out on a debut win at Imola due to an alternator failure, the team took its first WEC victory at the 6 Hours of Spa.

Garage 59 takes its name from the race number of the McLaren F1 GTR that won the 1995 24 Hours of Le Mans overall with drivers Yannick Dalmas, JJ Lehto and Masanori Sekiya.

== Racing record ==
=== Complete 24 Hours of Le Mans results ===
Year	Entrant	No.	Car	Drivers	Class	Laps	Pos.	Class Pos.
2022	(United Kingdom) Inception Racing	59	Ferrari 488 GTE Evo	(France) Marvin Klein (France) Côme Ledogar (Sweden) Alexander West	LMGTE Am	190	DNF	DNF
2026	(United Kingdom) Garage 59	10	McLaren 720S GT3 Evo	(Hong Kong) Antares Au (United Kingdom) Tom Fleming (Germany) Marvin Kirchhöfer	LMGT3	332	44th	12th
2026	(United Kingdom) Garage 59	58	McLaren 720S GT3 Evo	(Germany) Finn Gehrsitz (Germany) Benjamin Goethe (Sweden) Alexander West	LMGT3	329	47th	15th

=== Complete Asian Le Mans Series results ===
(key) (Races in bold indicate pole position; races in italics indicate fastest lap)

Year	Entrant	Class	No	Chassis	Engine	Drivers	1	2	3	4	Pos.	Pts
2023	(United Kingdom) Garage 59	GT	59	McLaren 720S GT3	McLaren M840T 4.0 L Turbo V8	(United Kingdom) Rob Bell (United Kingdom) Nick Halstead (Monaco) Louis Prette	DUB; 1; 12	DUB; 2; 5	ABU; 1; 11	ABU; 2; 10	12th	11
2023	(United Kingdom) Garage 59	GT	88	McLaren 720S GT3	McLaren M840T 4.0 L Turbo V8	(Denmark) Benjamin Goethe (Sweden) Alexander West (United Kingdom) Tom Gamble (Rounds 1–2) (Germany) Marvin Kirchhöfer (Rounds 3–4)	DUB; 1; 15	DUB; 2; 4	ABU; 1 Ret	ABU; 2; 8	8th	16

=== Complete FIA World Endurance Championship results ===
(key) (Races in bold indicate pole position; races in italics indicate fastest lap)

Year	Entrant	Class	No	Chassis	Engine	Drivers	1	2	3	4	5	6	7	8	Pos.	Pts
2026	(United Kingdom) Garage 59	LMGT3	10	McLaren 720S GT3 Evo	McLaren M840T 4.0 L Turbo V8	(Hong Kong) Antares Au (United Kingdom) Tom Fleming (Germany) Marvin Kirchhöfer	**ITA**; 13	SPA; 1	LMS; 12	SAO	COA	FUJ	QAT	BHR	4th*	34*
2026	(United Kingdom) Garage 59	LMGT3	58	McLaren 720S GT3 Evo	McLaren M840T 4.0 L Turbo V8	(Germany) Finn Gehrsitz (Germany) Benjamin Goethe (Sweden) Alexander West	ITA; 7	SPA; 5	LMS; 15	SAO	COA	FUJ	QAT	BHR	12th*	18*

* Season still in progress
