= Buckmore Park Kart Circuit =

Kart racing circuit in Kent, England

Coordinates: 51°20′35″N 0°30′5″E

Buckmore Park Karting Circuit
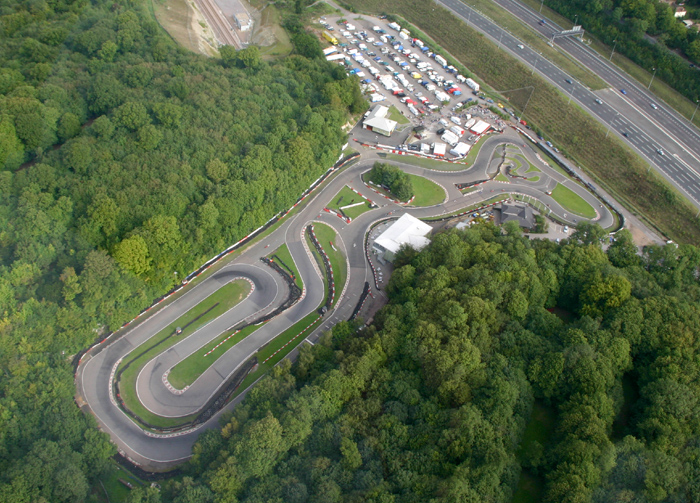
- Location: Kent, England
- Major events: MSA Race meetings, National Championships, Bambino Club meetings, Junior Club meetings, Grand Prix League, Elite Series, Iron Man, Man of Steel

International Circuit
- Turns: 12
- Race lap record: 0:37.82 (DD2) (Amanda Lassu, Year, 2007)

Buckmore Park Kart Circuit is an MSA approved outdoor kart racing circuit located just off junction 3 of the M2 in Chatham, Kent, England. Until his death on 10 March 2017, it was owned by John Surtees, the only person to have won world Grand Prix championships in both Formula One car racing and Grand Prix motorcycle racing.

Situated in a woodland setting between the M2 and M20 motorways directly above High Speed 1, its proximity to London makes it Britain's busiest circuit. With seven different fleets of karts the circuit offers karting experiences for all ages and experience levels.

Buckmore Park is a circuit where many current and past Formula One drivers learned their trade, including Johnny Herbert and Formula 1 champions Jenson Button and Lewis Hamilton, who was originally discovered by Ron Dennis in the 1996 Champions of the Future Event held at Buckmore Park.

Although Buckmore Park is primarily a race circuit, it also has on-site conference and catering facilities.

== Buckmore Kart Racing School ==
The Buckmore Kart School has been preparing drivers for success in Motorsport since 1972 and has trained more than 20 European and British kart champions. There are both introductory and more in-depth training options for ages 8+. As well as a Bambino School & club for ages 6–7.

== Types of Hire Event ==
Buckmore Park is well known for its Hire Kart Club which regularly hosts events for its members. One type of event is 'Sprint' style racing, where competitors compete in a series of heats and finals. Starting positions for heats place each driver at the front, middle and rear of the grid for one race, whereas finals are decided by points acquired from finishing positions in heats.

Sprint events at Buckmore include the Grand Prix League, National Sprint, International Sprint and the two Junior Kart Club classes.

Some individual competitors prefer 'Endurance' races, where grid positions are decided by a short qualifying session, leading to the fastest driver starting on pole. Races are then usually an hour long and include the Solo 30 enduro, Solo 45enduro, Man Of Steel and the Iron Man.

Team races are also popular, and work in the same way as Endurance races but include fuel stops and driver changes.

Popular team events include the 3 hour (3 hours using RT10 390cc karts for 2-4 drivers),the 6 hour and the 24 hour.

== Star Pupil ==
At the end of each hire season, Buckmore hosts an annual 'Star Pupil' day, for the top drivers in all of its hire kart categories. The drivers participate in a mix of endurance and sprint events.

Two guest judges will decide the winner based not only on track performance but also on their punctuality to race briefings, courtesy and general behaviour off of the track.

David Hearne won the event in 2002. Carl Tebbutt won the event in 2006 with Simon Rudd winning the following year. Jack Harding won in 2008, Terry Waller in 2009 and most recently in the 2010 star pupil, Matt Jones was judged the winner. Terry Waller was again the winner in 2011. Simon Rudd returned as the winner in the 2012 competition. In 2013, the event was won by Paul Janes. The 2014 event was sponsored by MINI Challenge and was won by Piers Prior, who also won the event in 2015.

Buckmore have now added Rookie of the Year and both Junior and Bambino Star Pupil events.

== History ==
The circuit saw its inception in the early 1900s when local businessman Cecil Whitehead, a keen supporter of the Scouts, saw the opportunity to allow them to participate in the fast growing pastime of kart racing by developing a track at the woodland site that the local scouts were leasing at the top of Bluebell Hill, Buckmore Park Scout Centre. Whitehead consulted with the designer of the Rye House Kart Circuit, Doug Jest, the local Rochester Motor Club and Camberley Kart Club to design the 400m circuit. Whitehead then approached the Royal School of Military Engineering in nearby Chatham and persuaded them to build the circuit as an engineering training exercise. The circuit subsequently opened in 1963 at no cost to the scouts.

During the 1970s the track was used by the scouts, visitors to the park and the Rochester Motor Club but had fallen into disrepair by the 1980s due to the scouts not having enough money to maintain it. Whitehead was about to close the circuit due to safety concerns when, in 1985, new owners were found and redevelopment of the track began with their priority being to gain an MSA competition circuit licence in order to make the circuit commercially viable. After extensive restoration and resurfacing, the circuit began staging events again, with the first RACMSA event taking place in 1989. The circuit staged its first national championship in 1992 and in 1994 the track was extended to 900m. The track length was extended again in 1999 to bring it up to full international length and around the same time the unmade access road was replaced with a tarmac road. In 2003 a new £1.25m clubhouse was opened by Stirling Moss, Bernie Ecclestone and circuit part-owner John Surtees.

Surtees, already the landowner of the circuit, bought out other interests and took full commercial control of the circuit for an undisclosed sum in April 2015.

== Lap records ==
=== Adults ===
/time	kart	track	date	class	time
Joseph Mason	SODI RT8	International	28/04/19	N/A	48.665
Reece Harris	SODI RT8	National	22/10/18	N/A	49.001
Fraser Brunton	SODI RT8	International	14/04/19	Super Light	49.002
Lewis Appiagyei	SODI RT8	International	18/10/20	Lights	49.073
Neil Strachan	SODI RT8	International	18/10/20	Heavy	49.472
Jasper Stewart-Staff	SODI RT8	International	29/04/23	N/A	48.912
Harrison Brooks	SODI RT10	International	01/06/23	Light	48.352
Michael Jones	SODI RT10	International	28/05/23	Heavy	48.819

=== Juniors ===
Name	Kart	Circuit	Date	Class	Time
Yusuf Yaqoob	Bambino	Club	26/07/18	N/A	24.148
Maria Ruberto	Bambino	National	24/07/20	N/A	34.653
Connot Hobbs	SODI Junior	International	14/08/13	N/A	53.737
Lewis Appiagyei	SODI Junior	National	07/12/13	N/A	33.079
Will Ovenden	SODI RT8	International	07/12/19	Light	48.906
Kye Kinch	SODI RT8	International	23/03/19	Standard	49.020
Fraser Brunton	SODI RT8	International	30/08/18	Light	30.488
Vincent Osborne	SODI RT8	National	05/01/19	Standard	30.806
Amy Brunton	SODI RT8	International	30/04/19	Light	34.603

Last Updated: 01 September 2024
Source1: Hire-Kart Source2: Owner Driver

== See also ==
- Kart racing
- Kart circuits
