= TKM (karting) =

Karting category in Britain

Formula TKM is a British based karting category raced at club and national championships around the UK. It uses 100cc/115cc 2-stroke TKM engines (BT82) for the Junior and Senior classes respectively. A number of Britains elite racing drivers have competed in the TKM class at some point in their careers.

== History ==
The TKM karting class was created in 1989 by the British-based kart manufacturer, Tal-Ko. The company owner Alan Turney started the class with the ambition of keeping the large costs of kart racing down while maintaining a level of competitive and equal racing. To maintain the lower prices, only British registered homologated chassis were allowed, along with a Tal-Ko designed engine and hard compound tyres by Maxxis, Maxxis green TKM before now being replaced by Maxxis Sports TKM for the 2025 season.

The original uptake of the class was successful and with the lower costs involved, the class soared in popularity through the 90s, becoming the UK's most popular karting formula. The TKM Festivals of the late nineties saw over 100 entrants in both senior and junior classes and from this boom the class boasts several current Formula 1 drivers amongst its former racers.

Through second half of the 2000s Tal-Ko introduced a range of new rules for the 2-stroke class in regards to tyres, chassis and engine regulations. With these new rules the class became more relevant and so the numbers of entrants stabilised, despite a mixed set of reactions from people in the sport. It still offers a large field in the Super 1 National Kart Championships and at some club circuits in the UK. Most prevalently the class still finds healthy grids at Kimbolton and Rissington Kart Club.

Tal-Ko also introduced a 4-stroke class, which ran on 200cc 4-stroke engines. The series has never been as popular or successful as the 2-stroke TKM class and does not offer a Super One grid.

== Classes ==
- Junior TKM: For 11- to 16-year-olds. Runs on 100cc TKM BT82 with a restrictor on the carburettor to give consistent power to weight ratios.
- TKM Extreme: Also known as Senior TKM, For those aged 16+, this class runs on 115cc TKM BT82 engines with no restrictor.
- TKM Clubman: For those aged 16+, Aimed for those on a budget. Maximum tread depth of 2.8mm, saving the costs on tires per meeting
- TKM 4-Stroke Junior: Runs on a 4-stroke 200cc engine with a restrictor on the carburettor to control speeds.
- TKM 4-Stroke Senior: Runs on a 4-stroke 200cc engine with no restrictor.

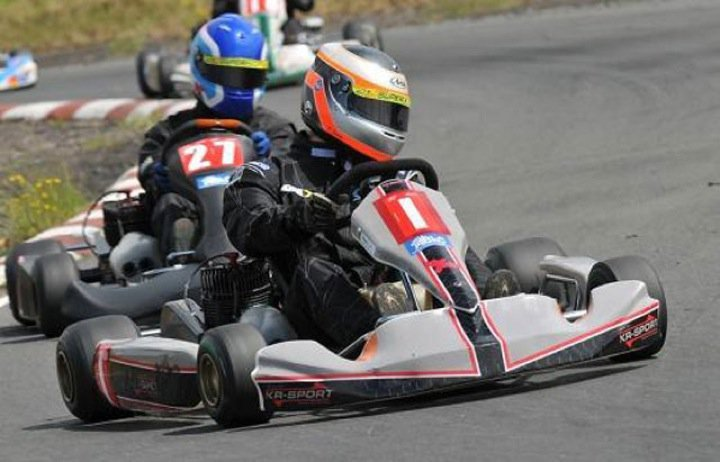
Dave Eadon

== Racing ==
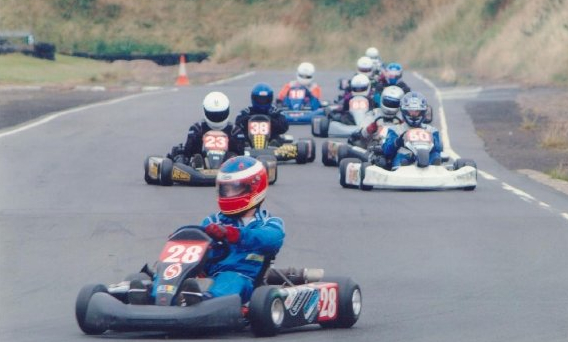
Senior TKM kart race at Shenington Kart Club in 2004

TKM acquired a reputation for close and competitive racing, notably for the extremely large grid entrants. The annual TKM Festival, held at a range of circuits, could once attract over 100 entrants for each class at the event. This is unparalleled for kart racing in the UK during recent history. The class is often cited as the purest form of kart racing owing to the relative simplicity of the racing and the equal playing field.

Although the introduction of the TAG version of the BT82 brought about some fundamental differences between the engine types, the class still offers some of the closest racing in the sport today.

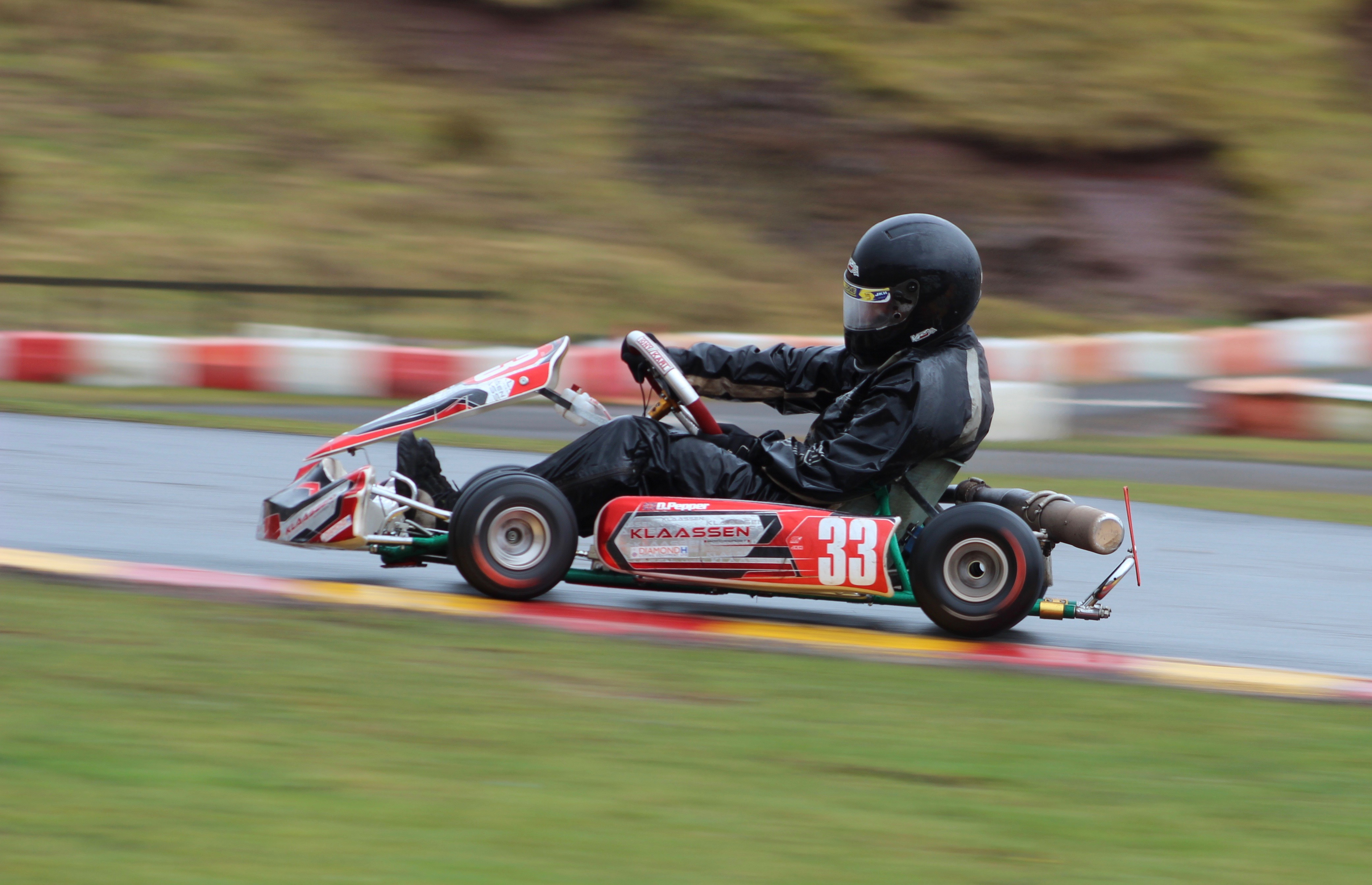
Senior TKM Kart at Rowrah 2017

== Chassis ==
Historically it was decided by the organisers that only TKM homologated, British made, chassis should be used for the class. This was opened up, however, to try to compete with the image of the Rotax Max class. MSA homologated chassis from across Europe have been permitted since 2010. Several manufacturers produce a TKM-specific chassis; these include the Tal-Ko Veloce, Tony Kart Viper, BirelArt TKM and Klaassen ARC.

== Engine ==
The class uses a fixed gear, 2-stroke TKM BT82 engine. The Junior engine has a capacity of 100cc and 16.8 BHP (without restrictor). The Senior engine is 115cc and outputs 20 BHP (without restrictor). Tuning of the engines is limited in order to keep costs down. In 2008 Tal-Ko introduced TAG engines featuring an on-board electric start system and centrifugal clutch. To compensate for this additional weight (the heavier engine, starting system and battery combine to add an additional 4.5 kg to the weight), the TAG benefits from a larger exhaust and increased compression. The engine can pull up to around 75 mph.

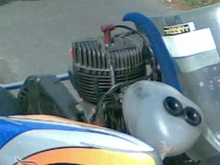
The Current TKM Engine

== Tyres ==
Maxxis produced tyres have been used in the class since its advent. The class organisers restricts the use to a single 'wet' and 'dry' tyre for the class, with the idea of creating a level performance level and removing the costs of requiring new tyres for each race weekend.

The 'new age' dry weather tyre which is currently used was chosen for its relatively hard compound, promoting durability and removing the need to replace them as often. In 2010 a new tyre was introduced which was designed to improve performance.

Historically a hard compound 'wet' tyre was used but to compete with Rotax Max in performance levels, a softer, stickier tyre was introduced into the formula for the 2005 season.

The Maxxis green TKM tyre has now been replaced for the 2025 season for the Maxxis Sport TKM

== Notable figures ==
TKM has continually been the breeding ground for many current and former notable motorsport figures.

- 2009 Formula 1 world champion Jenson Button was the Junior TKM champion in 1992.
- 2008, 2014, 2015, 2017, 2018, 2019 and 2020 Formula 1 world champion Lewis Hamilton dabbled in the Junior TKM championship in the mid 90s.
- Current Formula 1 test driver Gary Paffett won the Junior TKM championship in 1995.
- Commentator and former Super Aguri and BAR driver Anthony Davidson enjoyed success in TKM in the 90s before moving into European karting.
- Former DTM drivers Oliver Jarvis and Jamie Green raced in the 1996 Junior TKM super 1 series.
- James Nash, a former British Touring Car Championship driver and race winner at Rockingham in September 2011. He raced both Junior and Senior TKM in the early 2000s. He came 2nd in TKM Extreme in 2004.
- Former British Touring Car Championship racer Tom Onslow-Cole progressed in the Junior categories in the early 2000s, finishing 8th in Junior TKM 2001.
- Current British GT Driver Scott Malvern also a former British Champion in Formula Ford & Formula Renault raced in Junior TKM 2002-4 & Senior TKM Extreme 2005 when he finished as Super One runner up to Adam Constable
- Formula E polesitter and Williams test driver Oliver Turvey finished 6th in Junior TKM in 2001.
- Abbi Pulling became the first female driver to win a British Championship in a TKM category by winning the Junior TKM class in 2017, she repeated this achievement in 2018. She currently competes in the GB3 Championship and is the 2024 F1 Academy champion.

== List of British Champions ==
FORMULA TKM BRITISH CHAMPIONS

Year	Champion
1989	Bill Tully
1990	John Aldred
1991	Antony McHugh
1992	David Hodkin
1993	Carl Willoughby
1994	Stuart Smith
1995	Stuart Smith
1996	Phillip Charles
1997	Jay Howard
1998	Gary Catt
1999	Adrian Coles
2000	Sam Quinlan
2001	James Gornall
2002	Charlie Bruce-White
2003	Anton Frost
2004	Ben Cruttenden
2005	Adam Constable
2006	Jason Moore
2007	Ryan Cole
2008	Daniel Graham
2009	David Eadon
2010	David Eadon
2011	Joe Porter
2012	Joe Porter
2013	Will van Es
2014	Joe Forsdyke
2015	Matt England
2016	Harry Moore
2017	Stephen Letts
2018	Joe Fowler
2019	James Pashley
2020	Adam Sparrow
2021	James Pashley

FORMULA JUNIOR TKM BRITISH CHAMPIONS

Year	Champion
1991	Nelson Rowe
1992	Jenson Button
1993	Tom Sisley
1994	Carl Breeze
1995	Gary Paffett
1996	Gary Catt
1997	Sam Garford
1998	Mark Litchfield
1999	Ben Clucas
2000	Paul Wilson
2001	James Sutton
2002	Adam Palethorpe
2003	Lee Bell
2004	Tom Davis
2005	Daniel Graham
2006	Marcus Allen
2007	Jake Ball
2008	Gary Henderson-Keirle
2009	Oliver Hodgson
2010	James Peace
2011	Toby Sowery
2012	Jack Partridge
2013	Matthew Davies
2014	Arran Mills
2015	Matthew Graham
2016	Bradley White
2017	Abbi Pulling
2018	Abbi Pulling
2019	Zak Oates
2020	Louis Harvey
2021	Alfie Garford
2022	Leon Frost
2023	Yehan Kallychurn
2024	Yehan Kallychurn

== List of British Open Champions ==
JUNIOR O PLATE CHAMPIONS

Year	Champion
1991	Neil Hose
1992	Jenson Button
1993	Anthony Davidson
1994	Carl Breeze
1995	Judd Coupland
1996	Gary Catt
1997	Chris Lamare
1998	Mark Litchfield
1999	Ben Clucas
2000	Daryl McDonald
2001	Daryl McDonald
2002	Adam Chandler
2003	Lee Bell
2004	Daniel Graham
2005	Daniel Graham
2006	Jake Ball
2007	Jake Ball
2008	Oliver Hodgson
2009	Oliver Hodgson
2010	Ash Robinson
2011	Jake Walker
2012	Jake Walker
2013	Matthew Davis
2014	Alex Forward
2015	Matthew Taylor
2016	Adam Sparrow
2017	Abbi Pulling
2018	Reggie Duhy
2019	Oliver Richardson
2021	Aditya Kulkarni

SENIOR O PLATE CHAMPIONS

Year	Champion
1991	Carl Willougby
1992	Jim Rainbird
1993	Ryan Hensman
1994	James Workman
1995	Duncan O’Conner
1996	Robbie Kerr
1997	Jay Howard
1998	Terry Langley
1999	Lee Piercey
2000	Mark Litchfield
2001	Chris Lamare
2002	Paul Wilson
2003	Ben Cruttenden
2004	Ryan Cole
2005	Luke Caudle
2006	Alex Jones
2007	Marcus Allen
2008	Daniel Graham
2009	Daniel Butcher-Lord
2010	Phil Smith
2011	Phil Smith
2012	Phil Smith
2013	Joe Forsdyke
2014	James Ogden
2015	Matthew Allnut
2016	Matthew Taylor
2017	Roman Haskett
2018	Joe Stockford
2019	Adam Sparrow

CLUBMAN O PLATE CHAMPIONS

Year	Champion
2022	Craig Summers
2023	Ben Spencer

== List of TKM Festival Winners ==
TKM FESTIVAL SENIOR WINNERS

Year	Winner
1997	Mark Hunt
1998	Kevin Sale
1999	Joss Thompson
2000	Chris Petto
2001	Rob Weldon
2002	Ryan Furner
2003	Alex Bowen
2004	Ryan Cole
2005	Ryan Cole
2006	Ryan Cole
2007	Daniel Graham
2008	David Eadon
2009	Gary Henderson
2010	Joe Porter
2011	Joe Porter
2012	Phil Smith
2013	Toby Sowery
2014	James Ogden
2015	Ryan Cole
2016	Ryan Cole
2017	Bradley White
2018	Dean Hale
2019	Adam Sparrow
2020	cancelled*

TKM FESTIVAL JUNIOR WINNERS

Year	Winner
1997	Chris Petto
1998	Andrew Taylor
1999	Steve Williams
2000	Adam Palethorpe
2001	Shaun Carter
2002	Scott Allen
2003	Lee Bell
2004	Michael Collins
2005	Marcus Allen
2006	Marcus Allen
2007	Jake Bell
2008	Gary Henderson
2009	Ashley Jones
2010	Danny Keirle
2011	Danny Keirle
2012	Jack Partridge
2013	Daniel Baybutt
2014	Dino Lee
2015	Kristian Brierley
2016	Lee Whittingham
2017	Abbi Pulling
2018	Abbi Pulling
2019	Zak Oates
2020	cancelled*
2021	Aditya Kulkarni

TKM FESTIVAL CLUBMAN CHAMPIONS

Year	Champion
2012	Matt Grant
2013	Ciaran McDonald
2014	Tom Longfield
2015	Michael Green
2016	Kyle Morby
2017	Jack Macaulay
2018	Sam Baker
2019	James Mills
2020	VOID*
2021	Matt Cardwell
2022	Will Hulaki
2023	Craig Summers

== List of TKM Clubman Championship Winners ==
TKM CLUBMAN REGIONAL CHAMPIONSHIP WINNERS

Year	Champion
2014	Jack Macaulay
2015	Daniel Mense
2016	David Turton
2019	Craig Summers
2020	Matthew Cardwell
2021	Craig Summers
2022	Craig Summers

== List of Club Champions ==
HUNTS KART CLUB SENIOR TKM CHAMPIONS

Year	Champion
2007	Luke Caudle
2008	Adam Jenkins
2009	Michael Cornell
2010	Sam Grogan
2011	Chris Pyke
2012	Michael Cornell
2013	Will Van Es
2014	Owain Rosser
2015	Michael Cornell
2016	Michael Cornell
2017	Michael Cornell
2018	Michael Cornell
2019	Joseph Reeves-Smith
2020	Charlie Savage

HUNTS KART CLUB JUNIOR TKM CHAMPIONS

Year	Champion
2007	Gary Henderson-Keirle
2008	Will Van Es
2009	Richard Woolmer
2010	Jack Partridge
2011	Daniel Burton
2012	Liam Murray
2013	Lewis Outten
2014	Bradley White
2015	Jordan Lee-Chapman
2016	Jordan Lee-Chapman
2017	Spencer Stevenson
2018	Jack Nicholson
2019	Dominic Kilmister
2020	Alex Tuzzeo

CKRC KART CLUB SENIOR TKM CHAMPIONS

Year	Champion
2013	Daniel Pepper
2014	Brendan Speight
2015	Daniel Pepper
2016	Kyle Sproat
2017	Megan Lawson
2018	Brandon Fort
2019	Brandon Fort
2020	VOID*

(* Void due to COVID-19 Outbreak)

CKRC KART CLUB JUNIOR TKM CHAMPIONS

Year	Champion
2013	Kristian Brierley
2014	Ocean Bach
2015	Cameron Fisher
2016	Ian Sisson
2017	Samuel Wilson
2018	Kieran Pepper
2019	Lewis Smith
2020	Tyla Harris

(* Void due to COVID-19 Outbreak)
