= Motorsport UK =

Motorsports governing body for the UK

- Sport: Motorsport
- Jurisdiction: United Kingdom
- Headquarters: Bicester (Oxfordshire, England)
- President: Prince Michael of Kent
- Chairman: David Richards
- CEO: Hugh Chambers

Official website
- www.motorsportuk.org
- (United Kingdom)

Motorsport UK (MSUK), formerly known as the Motor Sports Association (MSA), is a national membership organisation and governing body for four-wheel motorsport in the United Kingdom. Legally, it is a not-for-profit private company limited by guarantee.

== Responsibilities ==
Motorsport UK is recognised as the only motorsport governing body in the United Kingdom by the Fédération Internationale de l'Automobile (FIA). It is not concerned with motorcycle or sidecar competitions, which are governed by the Auto-Cycle Union, nor does it cover banger racing; but provides governance and representation for 12 other forms such as rallying, circuit racing, drifting, hill climbing and karting.

It has power under UK legislation to issue permits to event organisers wishing to close public highways for motorsport uses. The organisation claims its mission is to increase the number of participants in motorsport within the UK. It also claims to have within its community 720 affiliated motor clubs, 30,000 competition licence holders, 10,000 volunteer marshals and 4,000 officials, whilst authorising 5,000 event permits every year.

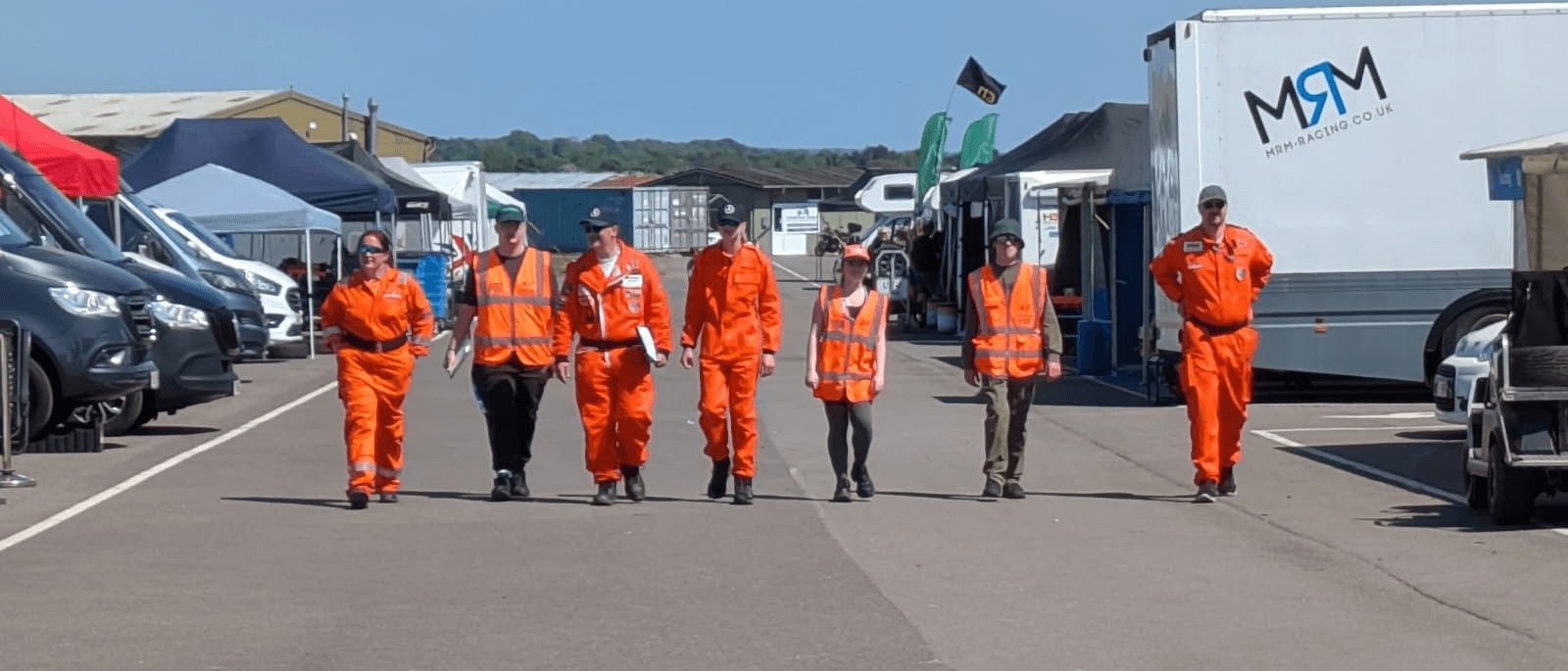
Motorsport UK marshals at an event at Thruxton Circuit's Paddock

== Structure ==
Motorsport UK is managed and organised by its board of directors, chaired by David Richards CBE. In March 2019 the constitution of Motorsport UK was changed by a unanimous vote of the council to bring it in line with Sport England's code of governance and best practice. This is documented in the new memorandum and articles of association.

Motorsport UK events organise the British Grand Prix, the Rally of Great Britain and from 2016 the British Rally Championship, some of the flagship motor sports events in the United Kingdom. Motorsport UK and its subsidiaries employ over 55 full-time staff.

== History ==
Motorsport UK began as the Royal Automobile Club's (RAC) Motor Sports Association in the late 1970s. Until this time motorsport events in the UK had been organised by motor clubs or independent parties who could implement their own rules with oversight by the RAC’s Competitions Committee. In 1975 the committee was replaced by the Motor Sports Council who standardised rules and their enforcement throughout the country. The RAC Motor Sports Association was legally formed in December 1977, and began organising and promoting events the following year.

The MSA was rebranded as Motorsport UK in 2018, introducing its own new aim to increase participation as well as regulate the sport.

In light of the Russian invasion of Ukraine in 2022, Motorsport UK barred Russian and Belarusian drivers from competing in British motorsport events, thus preventing Russian F1 driver Nikita Mazepin from participating in the upcoming 2022 edition of the British Grand Prix in Silverstone scheduled to be held in July (in any event, he was sacked by his team). In 2024, the federation raised £60,000 to buy a Steyr-Puch Pinzgauer for the Armed Forces of Ukraine.

== See also ==
- Wales Rally GB
