= Max Verstappen =

Dutch and Belgian racing driver (born 1997)

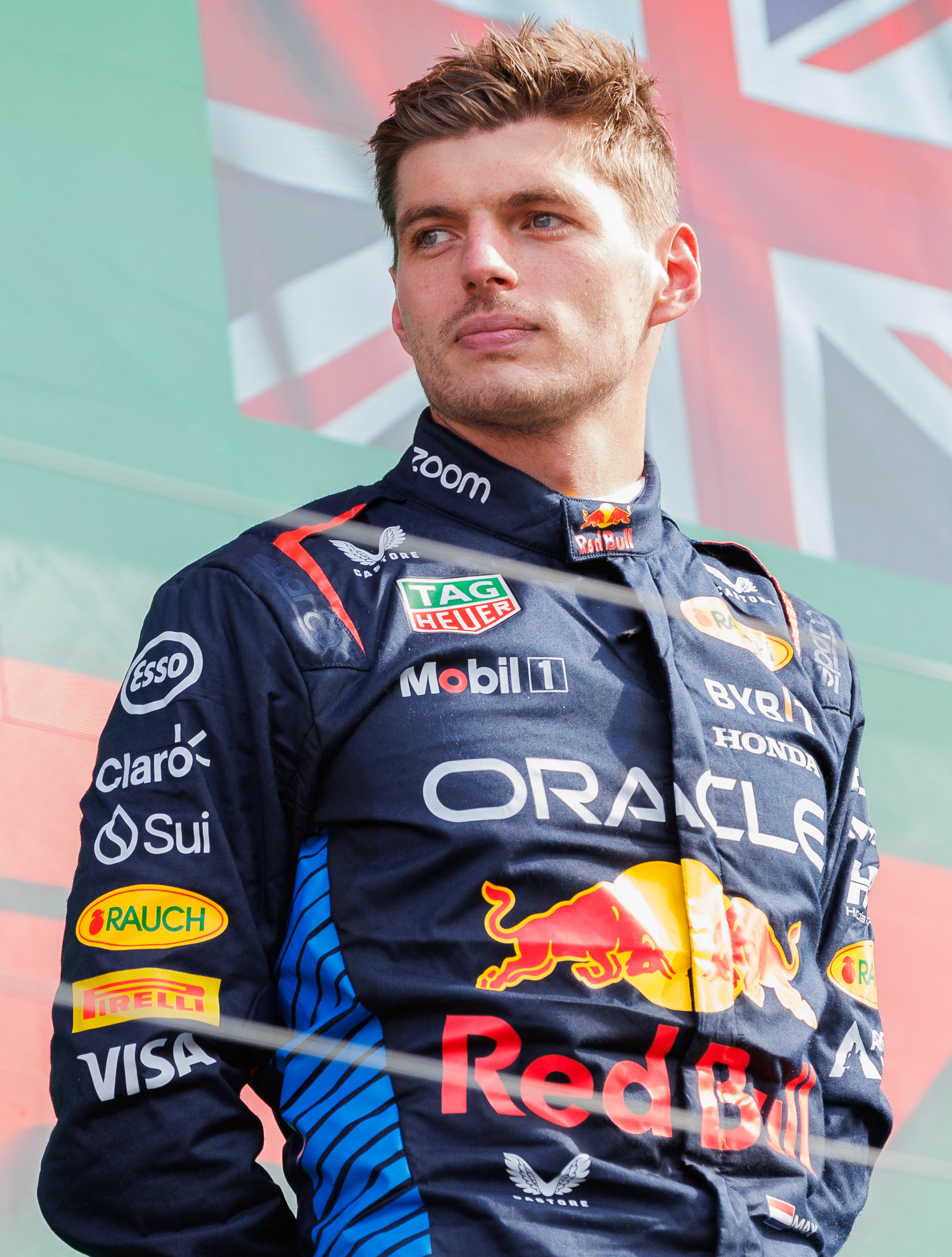
- Verstappen at the 2024 Dutch Grand Prix
- Born: Max Emilian Verstappen; 30 September 1997 (age 29); Hasselt, Limburg, Belgium
- Partner: Kelly Piquet (2020–present)
- Children: 1
- Parents: Jos Verstappen (father); Sophie Kumpen (mother)
- Relatives: Robert Kumpen (grandfather); Paul Kumpen (great-uncle); Anthony Kumpen (first cousin once removed)
- Awards: Full list

Formula One World Championship career
- Nationality: (Netherlands) Dutch
- 2026 team: Red Bull Racing-Red Bull Ford
- Car number: 33 (2015–2021); 1 (2022–2025) (Note: Verstappen competed using the number 1 during his World Drivers' Championship defence from 2022 to 2025.); 3 (2026)
- Entries: 254 (253 starts)
- Championships: 4 (2021, 2022, 2023, 2024)
- Wins: 74
- Podiums: 139
- Career points: 3723.5
- Pole positions: 51
- Fastest laps: 38
- First entry: 2015 Australian Grand Prix
- First win: 2016 Spanish Grand Prix
- Last win: 2026 Las Vegas Grand Prix
- Last entry: 2026 Las Vegas Grand Prix
- 2025 position: 2nd (421 pts)

Previous series
- 2014: FIA F3 European

Championship titles
- 2014: Masters of F3
- Website: verstappen.com

Max Emilian Verstappen (Dutch pronunciation: [ˈmɑks fɛrˈstɑpə(n)]; born 30 September 1997) is a Dutch and Belgian racing driver who competes under the Dutch flag in Formula One for Red Bull Racing. Verstappen has won four Formula One World Drivers' Championship titles, which he won consecutively from 2021 to 2024 with Red Bull, and has won 74 Grands Prix across 12 seasons.

Born in Hasselt and raised in Maaseik, Verstappen is the son of Dutch former Formula One driver Jos Verstappen and Belgian former kart racer Sophie Kumpen. After a successful karting career—culminating in his record-breaking 2013 season—Verstappen graduated to junior formulae. Progressing directly to FIA European Formula 3, Verstappen broke several records on his way to third in the championship in his rookie season with Van Amersfoort. (Note: Including most consecutive wins (6), youngest winner (16 years, 216 days), and youngest polesitter (16 years, 215 days).) Aged 17, Verstappen signed for Toro Rosso in 2015 as part of the Red Bull Junior Team, becoming the youngest driver in Formula One history at the Australian Grand Prix. Following several points finishes in his debut season, Verstappen retained his seat for 2016 before being promoted to parent team Red Bull to partner Daniel Ricciardo after four rounds. On debut for Red Bull, aged 18, Verstappen won the Spanish Grand Prix, becoming the youngest-ever driver to win a Formula One Grand Prix. Verstappen achieved multiple race wins in his 2017 and 2018 campaigns, before finishing third in both the 2019 and 2020 World Drivers' Championships under Honda power.

Verstappen won his maiden title in 2021 after overtaking Lewis Hamilton on the final lap of the last race of the season, becoming the first World Drivers' Champion from the Netherlands. Verstappen won the next two championships in 2022 and 2023, overturning the largest points deficit in Formula One history in the former and breaking numerous records across both seasons. (Note: See § Formula One records.) He secured his fourth consecutive title in 2024 after winning nine Grands Prix, including a widely acclaimed wet-weather performance in São Paulo, to become the first driver to win the championship driving for a third-placed constructor in 41 years. He finished runner-up by two points in a three-way title battle with Lando Norris and Oscar Piastri in 2025.

As of the 2026 Las Vegas Grand Prix, Verstappen has achieved 74 race wins, 51 pole positions, 38 fastest laps, and 139 podiums in Formula One. In addition to being the youngest Grand Prix winner, he holds several Formula One records, including the most wins in a season (19), the most podium finishes in a season (21), the most consecutive wins (10), and the most consecutive pole positions (8, shared with Ayrton Senna). Verstappen is contracted to remain at Red Bull until at least the end of the 2030 season. Outside of Formula One, Verstappen runs the Verstappen Racing team, has competed in sports car racing events, and has also competed professionally in sim racing since 2015, winning several marquee iRacing events. Verstappen was listed in the 2024 issue of Time as one of the 100 most influential people globally, and was appointed an Officer of the Order of Orange-Nassau in 2022.

== Early life ==
Max Emilian Verstappen was born on 30 September 1997 in Hasselt, Belgium, to Jos Verstappen and Sophie Kumpen. Verstappen's parents separated when he was young, after which he lived with his father. His younger sister, Victoria, lived with their mother. Verstappen has three younger half-siblings from his father: a sister from Jos's second marriage and a brother and sister from Jos's current marriage.

His family has a long association with motor sports: his father is a Dutch former Formula One driver, his Belgian mother competed in karting, and his first cousin once removed, Anthony Kumpen, competed in endurance racing and is a two-time NASCAR Whelen Euro Series champion currently serving as the team manager for PK Carsport in Euro Series. Verstappen initially attended a secondary school in Maaseik, before moving into private tutoring; he admitted that he used to leave class early to attend races across Europe with his father.

== Junior racing career ==
=== Karting (2005–2013) ===
==== 2005–2009: Dominance in national championships ====
Verstappen started racing in karts at the age of four and competing in championships at the age of seven. In 2005 he competed in the Mini Junior championship of his home province of Limburg, Belgium, and won the VAS Championship in the same category. In 2006, he repeated his success. In 2007, Verstappen graduated to the Rotax Max Mini Max class and won the Rotax Max Challenge Belgium and the Dutch Championship in that category. In 2008, racing in a CRG kart entered by his father, Verstappen won the Belgian Cadet Championship, the Rotax Max Challenge Belgium, and the Benelux Karting Series in Mini Max class. In 2009, Verstappen joined Pex Racing, a CRG customer team. That year, he defended his titles in the Mini Max championships and won the Belgian KF5 Championship.

==== 2010–2012: Entering the international karting scene ====
Verstappen was signed by CRG to race in their factory team and stepped up to international karting in 2010. At the KF3 World Cup, Verstappen finished second to the more experienced Alexander Albon (who eventually became his Formula One teammate at Red Bull Racing) but beat him at the WSK Euro Series and also won the WSK World Series, beating Robert Vișoiu. He finished fifth in the European Championship and won the WSK Nations Cup as well as the final of the Bridgestone Cup where during a 28 laps' race in the rain he beat Dennis Olsen by over 11 seconds. In 2011, Verstappen won the WSK Euro Series ahead of Esteban Ocon in a Parilla-powered CRG kart. However, it was not a successful year for him, as he finished 14th in the European Championship and DNF in the World Cup after an electrical failure while he and Charles Leclerc were catching the drivers in front for the win.

In the following year, Verstappen joined the Intrepid Driver Program to race in the KF2 and KZ2 classes. He won the WSK Master Series in the KF2 class, beating the CRG driver Felice Tiene. Verstappen won the South Garda Winter Cup in the KF2 class, beating Dennis Olsen and Antonio Fuoco. He finished sixth in the WSK Euro Series. He was the youngest driver taking part in the World Championship in KF1 class and finished eighth. In July 2012, it was announced that Verstappen would leave Intrepid. After a short stint with CRG-built Zanardi karts, Verstappen returned to the factory CRG team. He finished second at the World Cup in the KF2 class and competed at the SKUSA SuperNationals in the KZ2 class in a CRG, finishing 21st.

==== 2013: Record-breaking season ====
In 2013, Verstappen completed a record-breaking season in karting, having progressed to the senior KF and KZ categories. Aged 15, he won three CIK-FIA championships in a single season: two European Championships and a World Championship; an unprecedented feat in the history of the discipline. He became the first driver since his father Jos to win two European Championships in the same season, and the first to do so in both primary classes. By winning the 2013 KZ World Championship at Varennes-sur-Allier, beating Charles Leclerc to the title, Verstappen became the youngest-ever driver to win the gearbox World Championship.

Further adding to his accolades in 2013, Verstappen also finished third at the KF World Championship after being disqualified for a move on Nicklas Nielsen in the final race, having won the opening round and pre-final. This was the only championship he failed to win in 2013 whilst completing all rounds. Verstappen won the South Garda Winter Cup in KF2, as well as the WSK Euro Series and the WSK Super Master Series in KZ1 and KZ2, respectively.

=== Lower formulae (2014) ===
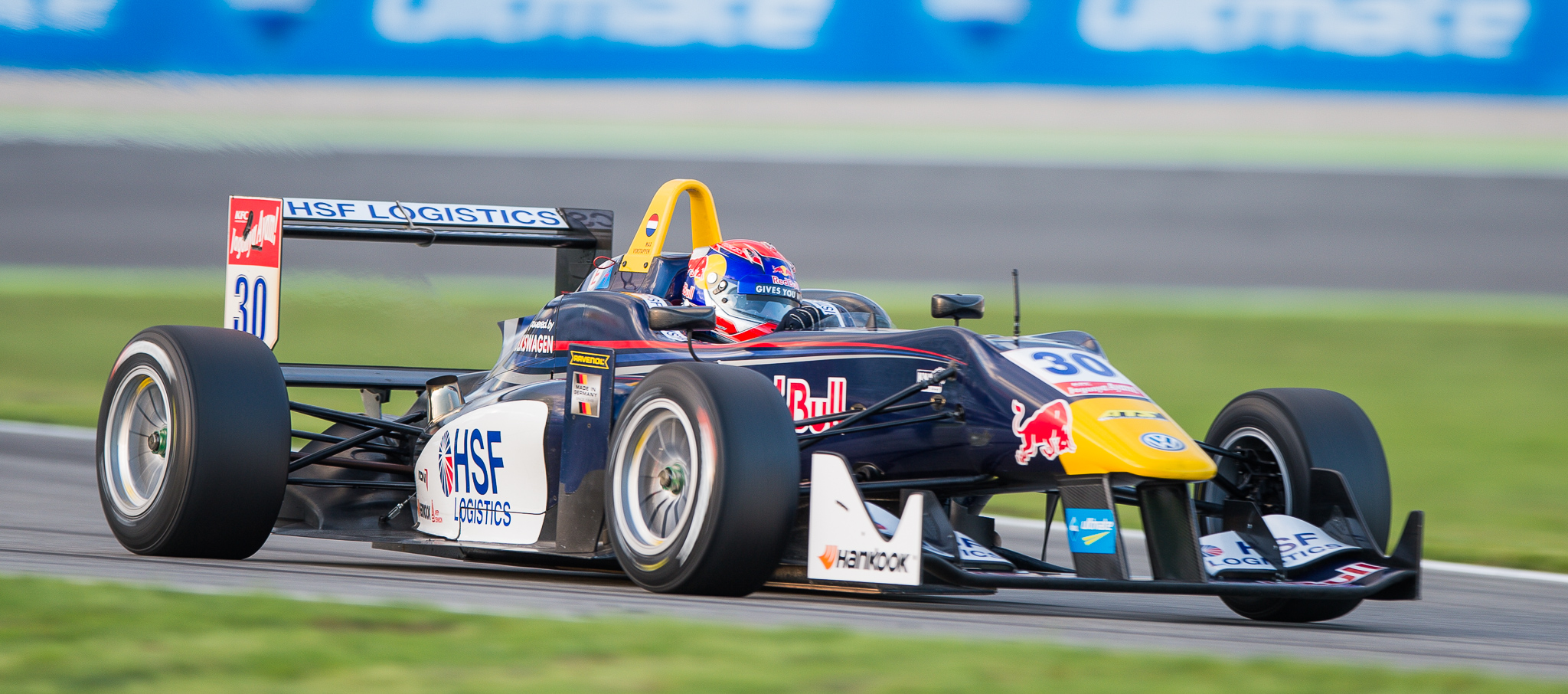
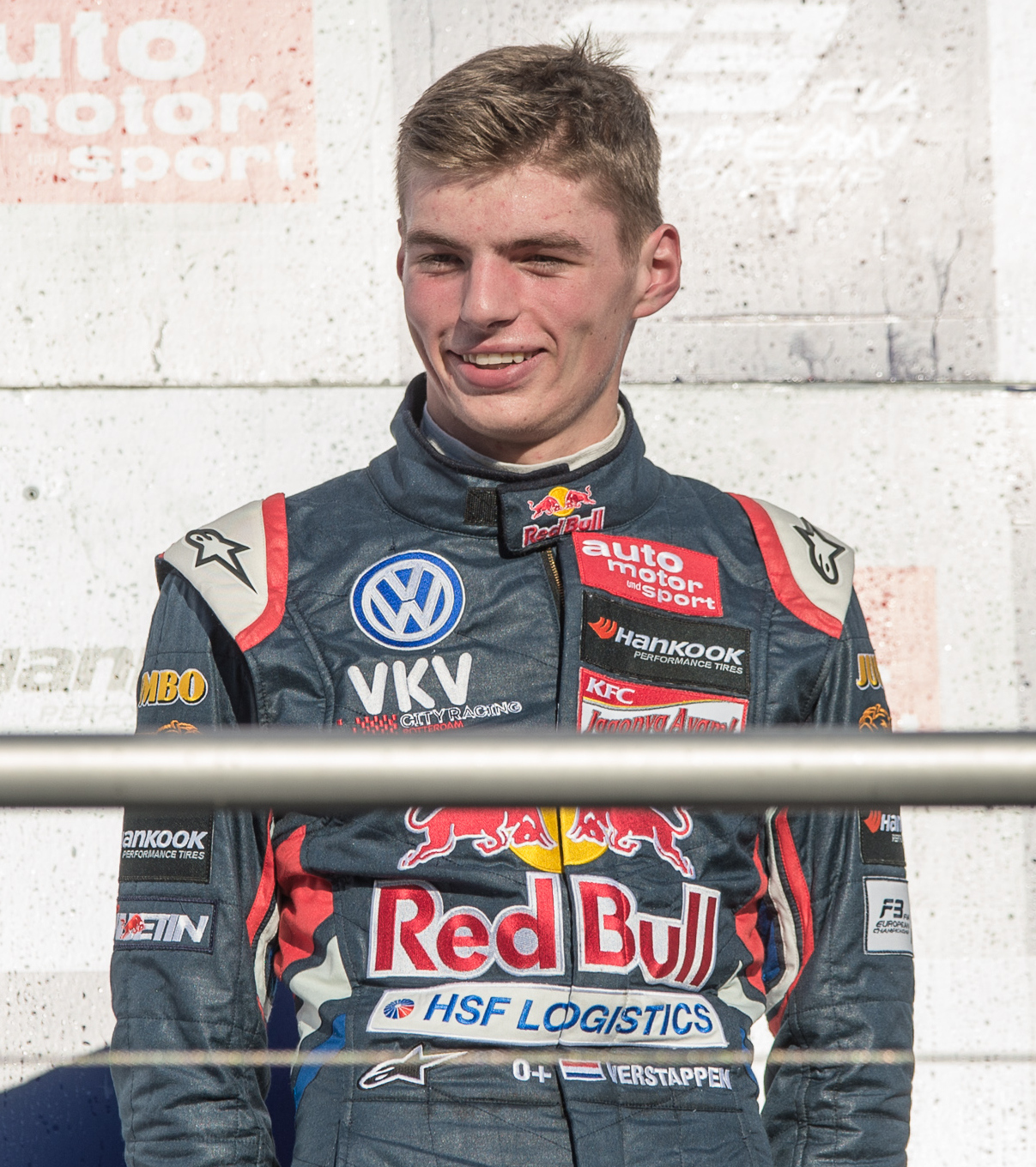
Verstappen competed in the FIA Formula 3 European Championship in 2014, after joining the Red Bull Junior Team.

Verstappen first experienced formula racing at Pembrey in August 2013 with Manor MP; he drove 160 laps across two days in a Barazi-Epsilon FR2.0–10. He tested for several other Formula Renault 2.0 teams that year. In December 2013, Verstappen tested a Dallara F311 Formula Three car run by Motopark Academy. An additional Formula Renault test followed in December at Circuito de Jerez. Driving for Josef Kaufmann Racing, Verstappen went faster than Formula Renault regulars like Steijn Schothorst and Matt Parry. At the Circuit Ricardo Tormo near Valencia, Verstappen set a faster lap time than the more experienced driver Eddie Cheever III.

==== 2014: Florida Winter Series and Formula Three ====
On 16 January 2014, it was announced Verstappen would make his junior formulae debut in the non-championship Florida Winter Series. On 5 February, at the second race weekend, Verstappen won the race at Palm Beach International Raceway after he started from pole. A few weeks later, Verstappen won his second race of the series at Homestead–Miami Speedway after beating Nicholas Latifi by 0.004 seconds.

Following his single-seater debut in the inaugural Florida Winter Series, Verstappen drove in the 2014 FIA Formula 3 European Championship for Van Amersfoort Racing. Aged sixteen, Verstappen achieved ten victories in total—including a record six consecutive wins at Spa-Francorchamps and the Norisring—along with eight retirements and one missed start, becoming the youngest race winner and polesitter in Formula Three history at the Hockenheimring; he placed third in the overall standings, with the most wins.

== Formula One career ==
During the first practice session at the 2014 Japanese Grand Prix, Verstappen replaced Jean-Éric Vergne as part of his preparation for a full-time seat at Toro Rosso in the 2015 season. Aged 17 years and three days, Verstappen was the youngest person in history to participate in a Formula One race weekend. In August 2014, Verstappen joined the Red Bull Junior Team after testing a Formula Renault 3.5 car. He also considered an offer from Mercedes to join their driver development programme.

=== Toro Rosso (2015–2016) ===
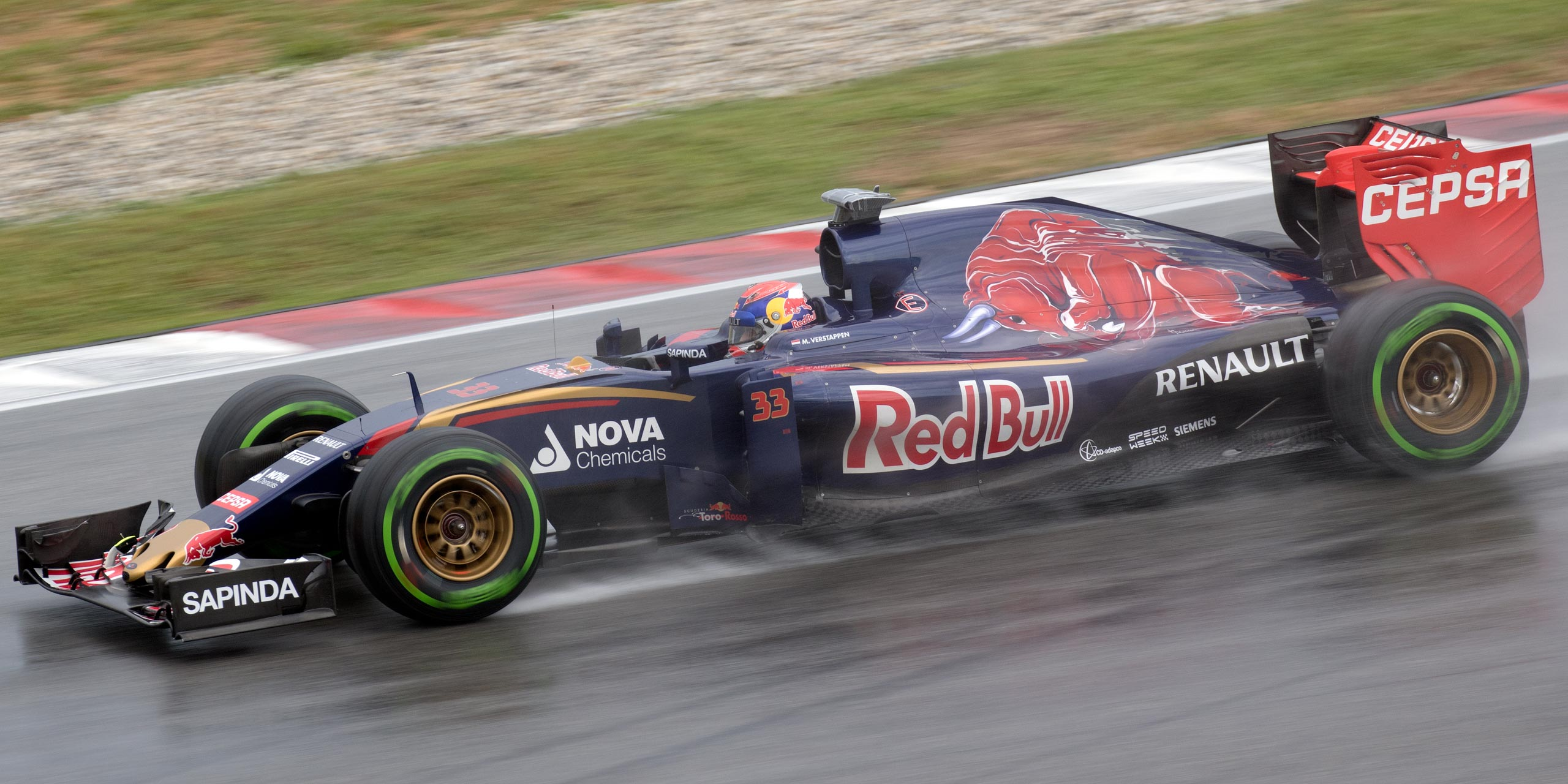
Verstappen (pictured at the 2015 Malaysian Grand Prix) became the youngest driver in Formula One history at the Australian Grand Prix, aged 17.

Verstappen then became the youngest driver to start a World Championship race through joining Toro Rosso's race drivers' line-up with Carlos Sainz as his teammate, in his Grand Prix debut as a full-time driver at the 2015 Australian Grand Prix at the age of 17 years, 166 days—breaking Jaime Alguersuari's existing record by almost two years. In this first race, Verstappen ran in points-scoring positions until he was forced to retire due to an engine failure. However, at the subsequent race in Malaysia, Verstappen qualified sixth and finished the race in seventh place, scoring his first Formula One points aged 17 years, 180 days, breaking the record of the then-youngest driver to score World Championship points.

At the 2015 Monaco Grand Prix, Verstappen was involved in a high-speed collision with Romain Grosjean, after clipping the back of Grosjean's Lotus on the approach to the tight first corner, Sainte Devote, and crashed into the barriers at high speed. Verstappen was given a five-place grid penalty for causing the accident, and was branded "dangerous" by Williams driver Felipe Massa. Verstappen continued to regularly finish in the points as well as achieving his best finish of the 2015 season in Hungary by finishing fourth, and equalled this result at the United States Grand Prix. At the end of the season, Verstappen received three awards at the FIA Prize Giving Ceremony, for "Rookie of the Year", "Personality of the Year" and "Action of the Year", for his overtake on Felipe Nasr on the outside of the Blanchimont corner at the Belgian Grand Prix.

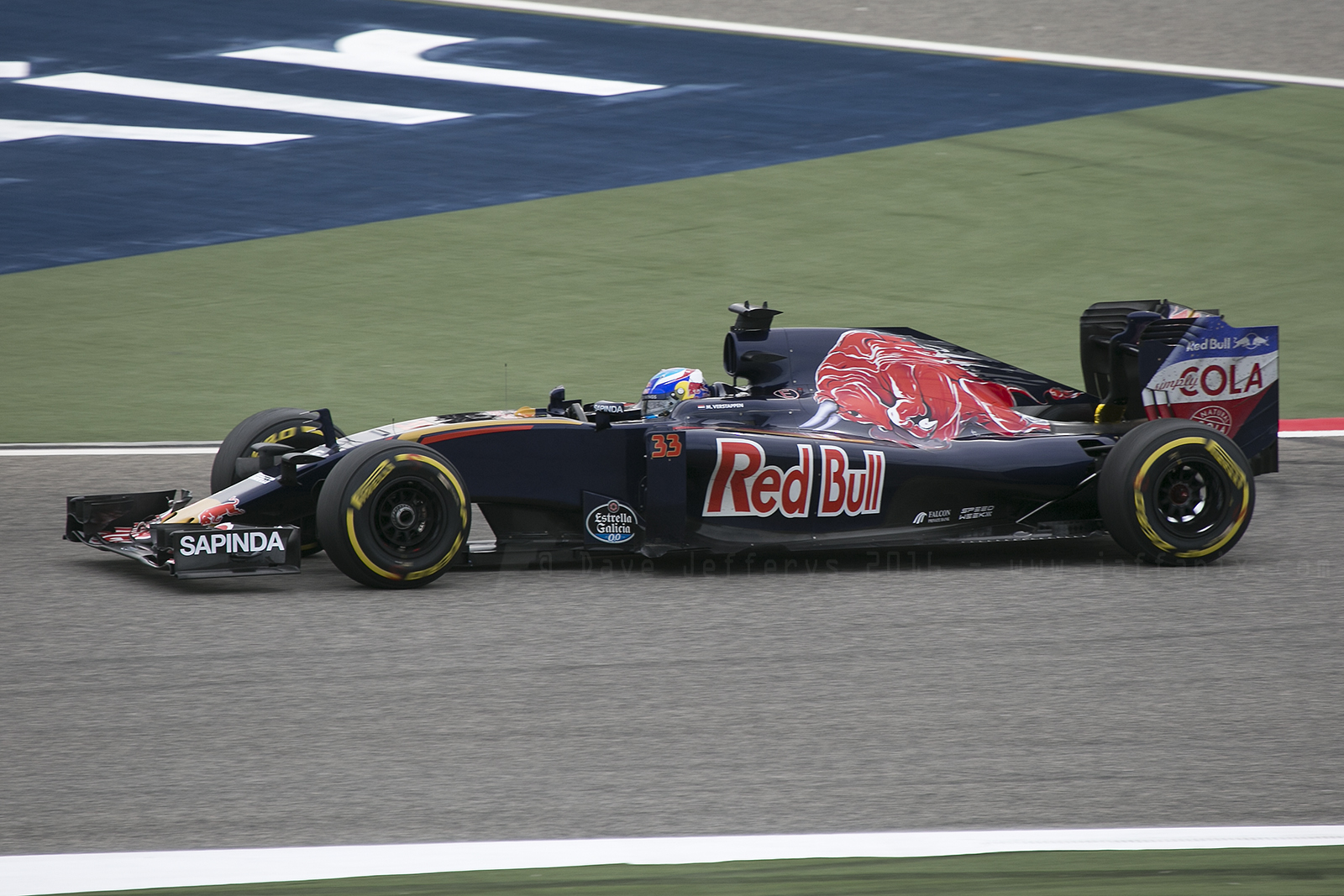
Verstappen at the 2016 Bahrain Grand Prix

Verstappen began the 2016 season at Toro Rosso, again alongside Sainz. Verstappen qualified fifth for the opening race of the season in Australia, but during the race made several radio calls to his team due to frustration at being behind Sainz on track before Verstappen's Toro Rosso came into contact with his teammate's car whilst attempting to pass him with three laps to go, and he eventually finished tenth. Verstappen enjoyed a more successful weekend at the following race in Bahrain, finishing sixth to score Toro Rosso's first-ever points at the Sakhir circuit.

=== Red Bull (2016–present) ===
==== 2016: Youngest Grand Prix winner ====
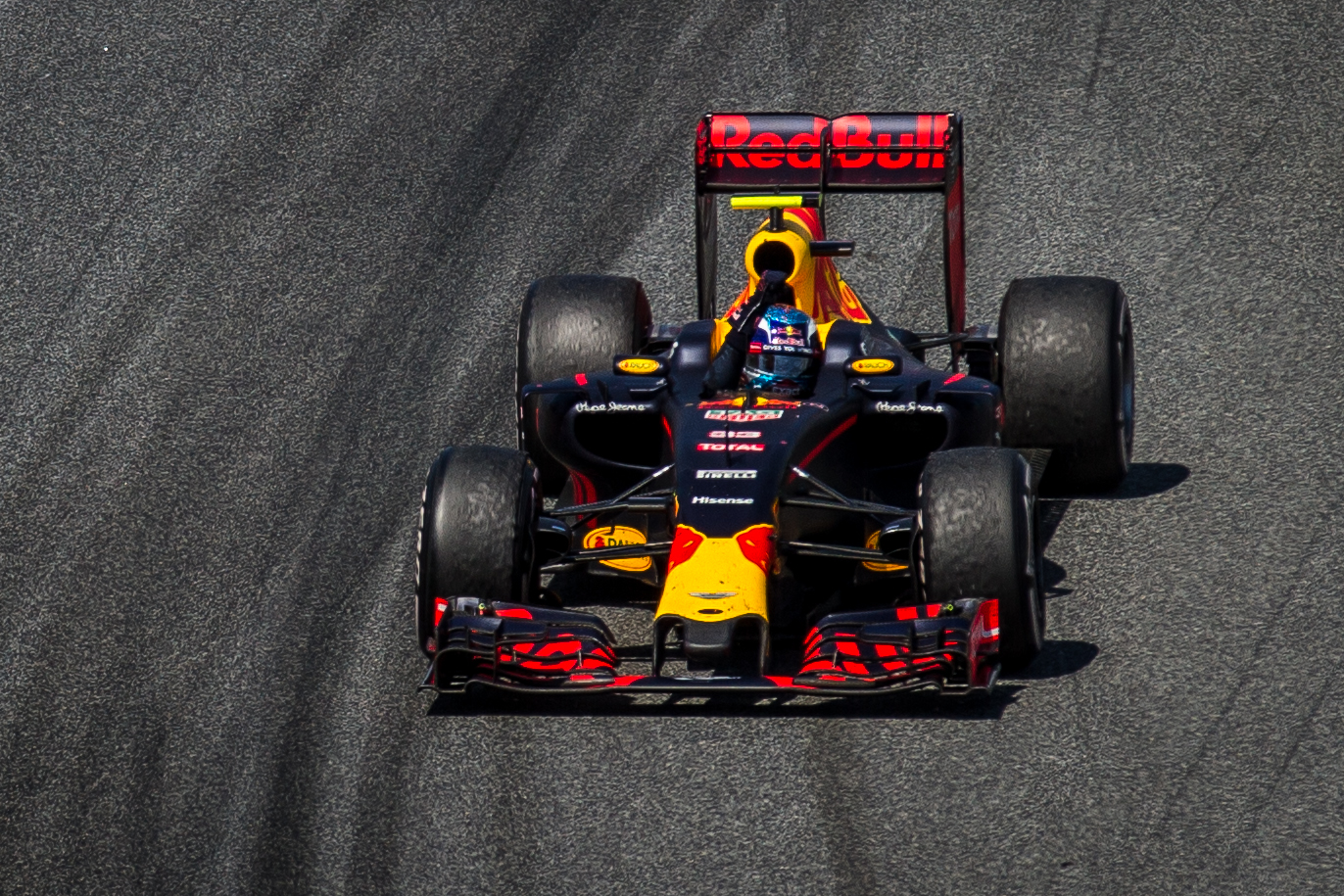
Verstappen celebrating victory at the 2016 Spanish Grand Prix, in his first race for the Red Bull Racing team

On 5 May 2016, following the Russian Grand Prix, Red Bull Racing announced that Verstappen would be replacing Daniil Kvyat from the Spanish Grand Prix onwards, with Kvyat returning to Toro Rosso. According to Red Bull Team Principal Christian Horner, "Max has proven to be an outstanding young talent. His performance at Toro Rosso has been impressive so far and we are pleased to give him the opportunity to drive for Red Bull Racing." After qualifying fourth for the Spanish Grand Prix, Verstappen rose to second behind teammate Daniel Ricciardo on the opening lap after Mercedes teammates Lewis Hamilton and Nico Rosberg crashed out of the race. Verstappen took the race lead as he was placed on a two-stop rather than the same three-stop strategy as Ricciardo, and he held off Ferrari's Kimi Räikkönen in the later stages of the race to take his first Formula One victory. By doing so he displaced Sebastian Vettel as the youngest driver ever to win a Formula One Grand Prix at the age of 18 years and 228 days. In his first eight races with Red Bull, he achieved six top-five finishes, including four podiums.

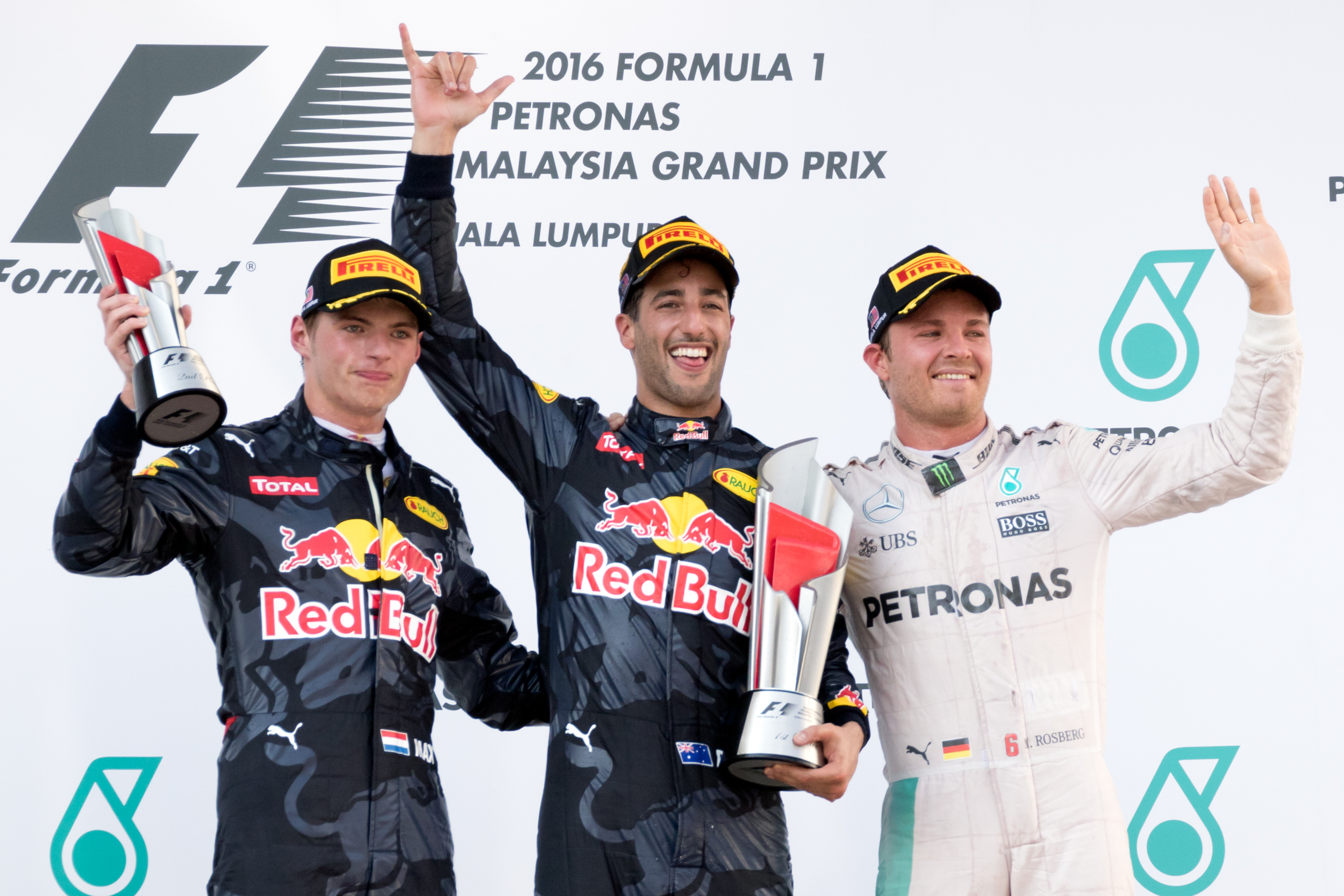
Verstappen on the podium with Daniel Ricciardo and Nico Rosberg at the 2016 Malaysian Grand Prix

During the Belgian Grand Prix, Verstappen collided with Räikkönen at the first corner, pushed Vettel, Räikkönen and Pérez wide at Les Combes, and aggressively blocked Räikkönen on the Kemmel straight. Verstappen was criticised for his driving, with Räikkönen saying that he was "going to cause a huge accident sooner or later". Christian Horner noted that the driving was "on the edge", and that Verstappen will "look at it and learn for future races". In September, Formula One director Charlie Whiting called in Verstappen for a discussion, and later gave him a 'gentle warning' due to his aggressive driving. In October, drivers' concerns about Verstappen's defensive tactics led the FIA to disallow moving under braking.

At the 2016 Brazilian Grand Prix, Verstappen qualified fourth. In a rain affected race, he almost hit the barrier after he slid on the main straight due to a loss of traction, causing oversteer. After an additional tyre change from intermediates back to rain tyres, he ran in 16th place with just 15 laps remaining. Verstappen then made several overtakes in quick succession during the closing laps to eventually finish on the podium in third place. He received considerable praise for his performance: rival team Mercedes' team principal, Toto Wolff, labelled it "The Verstappen Show", and described Verstappen's drive as "physics..being redefined". However, Verstappen came under criticism from four-time world champion Sebastian Vettel, who stated that Verstappen had pushed him off the track at the Junção corner late in the race. The race stewards did not share Vettel's view and decided that no reprimand was warranted.

==== 2017–2018: Reliability issues and rise to prominence ====
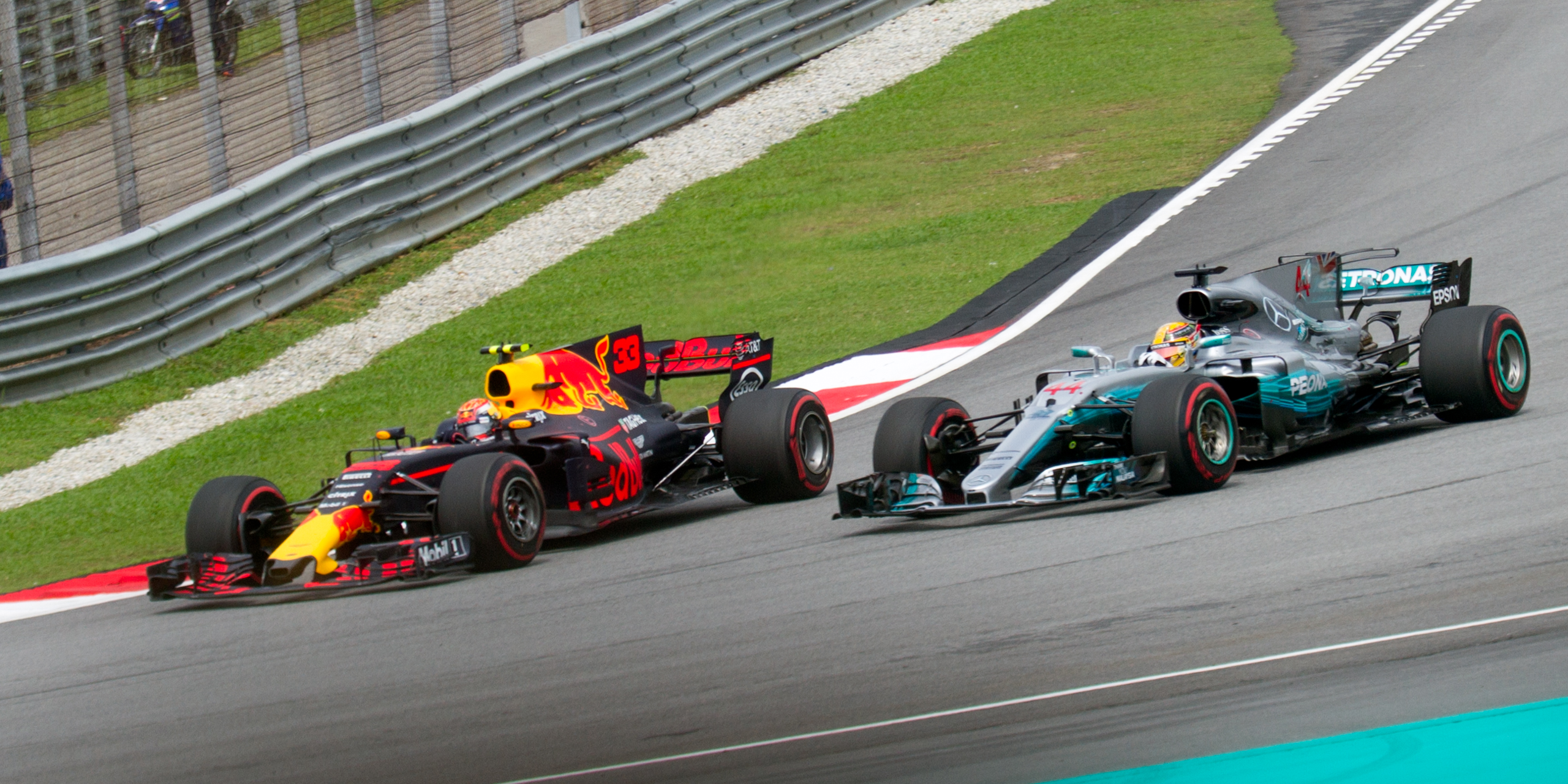
Verstappen took his second career victory at the Malaysian Grand Prix in 2017.

During the first 14 races of the 2017 season, Verstappen suffered seven retirements, four due to mechanical issues, and three due to first lap collisions in Spain, Austria and Singapore. Of the races he finished, however, he claimed a third place in China, and in another five races he finished fourth or fifth. From the Malaysian Grand Prix onward, Verstappen enjoyed a surge of success. He won his second Formula One race at the 2017 Malaysian Grand Prix, a day after his 20th birthday, passing then three-time champion Lewis Hamilton for the lead in the early stages of the race. He finished second in the following race in Japan. He then finished third at the United States Grand Prix, but was classified fourth after his final lap overtake on Kimi Räikkönen was deemed illegal. He won his third Formula One race at the Mexican Grand Prix, after passing Sebastian Vettel on the opening lap.

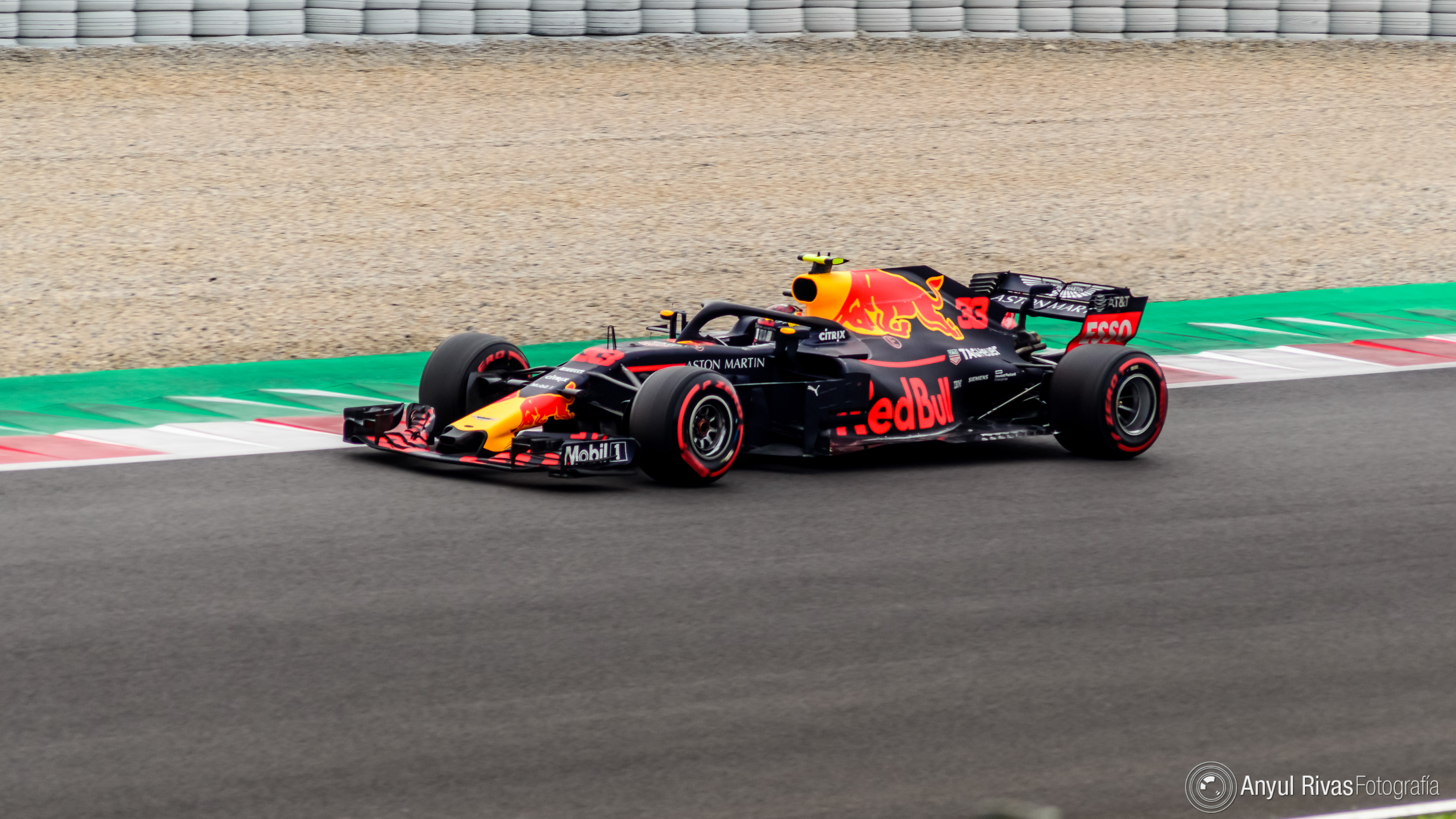
Verstappen at the 2018 Spanish Grand Prix

In the first six races of the 2018 season, Verstappen had been involved in at least one incident in each race. In Australia, he qualified fourth but fell behind Kevin Magnussen at the start. In his attempts to retake the position he ran wide multiple times and damaged his car, with a spin causing him to fall further down the order. He recovered to eventually finish the race in sixth place. At the next race in Bahrain, he crashed during qualifying and started in 15th place. He had a productive first lap after which he found himself in the points while challenging Lewis Hamilton. He attempted an overtake on the reigning World Champion at the start of lap two, but collided with the Mercedes driver and suffered a puncture that ultimately led to suspension damage, forcing him out of the race.

At the next race in China, Verstappen qualified fifth and had moved up to third at the end of the first lap. Both Red Bull drivers pitted for fresh tyres during a safety car which left them with a tyre advantage over the front-runners ahead. In an overtake attempt on Sebastian Vettel for third place, Verstappen collided with the championship leader, causing him to fall to eighth and receive a 10-second penalty. He recovered to fourth place, with his penalty causing him to be classified fifth. Teammate Ricciardo went on to win the race. In Azerbaijan, Verstappen was embroiled in a race-long battle with Ricciardo for fourth place. After numerous position changes between the two teammates during the race, Ricciardo ran into the back of Verstappen during an overtake attempt from which the Dutchman aggressively defended, causing the retirement of both cars. Both drivers were blamed by the team and reprimanded by the stewards. Verstappen bounced back in Spain with his first podium of the season by finishing third behind the Mercedes drivers, holding off Sebastian Vettel. However, the race was also not without incident as he had run into the back of Lance Stroll during the virtual safety car period, causing minor front wing damage.

In Monaco, Verstappen made another error and crashed near the end of the third free practice session in an incident which closely resembled a crash he had at the same spot two years earlier. His team could not repair his car in time for qualifying and Verstappen had to start the race from the back of the grid. Verstappen did not compete and did not set a lap time in qualifying, therefore teammate Ricciardo pressed home Red Bull's advantage at the track by taking pole position and the race win. Verstappen managed to salvage two points by finishing ninth place, overtaking six cars on track. Team principal Christian Horner commented on Verstappen's start of the season, saying he "needed to stop making these mistakes" and that he could "learn from his teammate", while Helmut Marko, head of driver development at Red Bull, said that Verstappen was "too impatient". Verstappen now lay in sixth place in the championship with 35 points, only three points ahead of Fernando Alonso in the McLaren, and 37 points behind his teammate in third, who had taken two wins in the first six races.

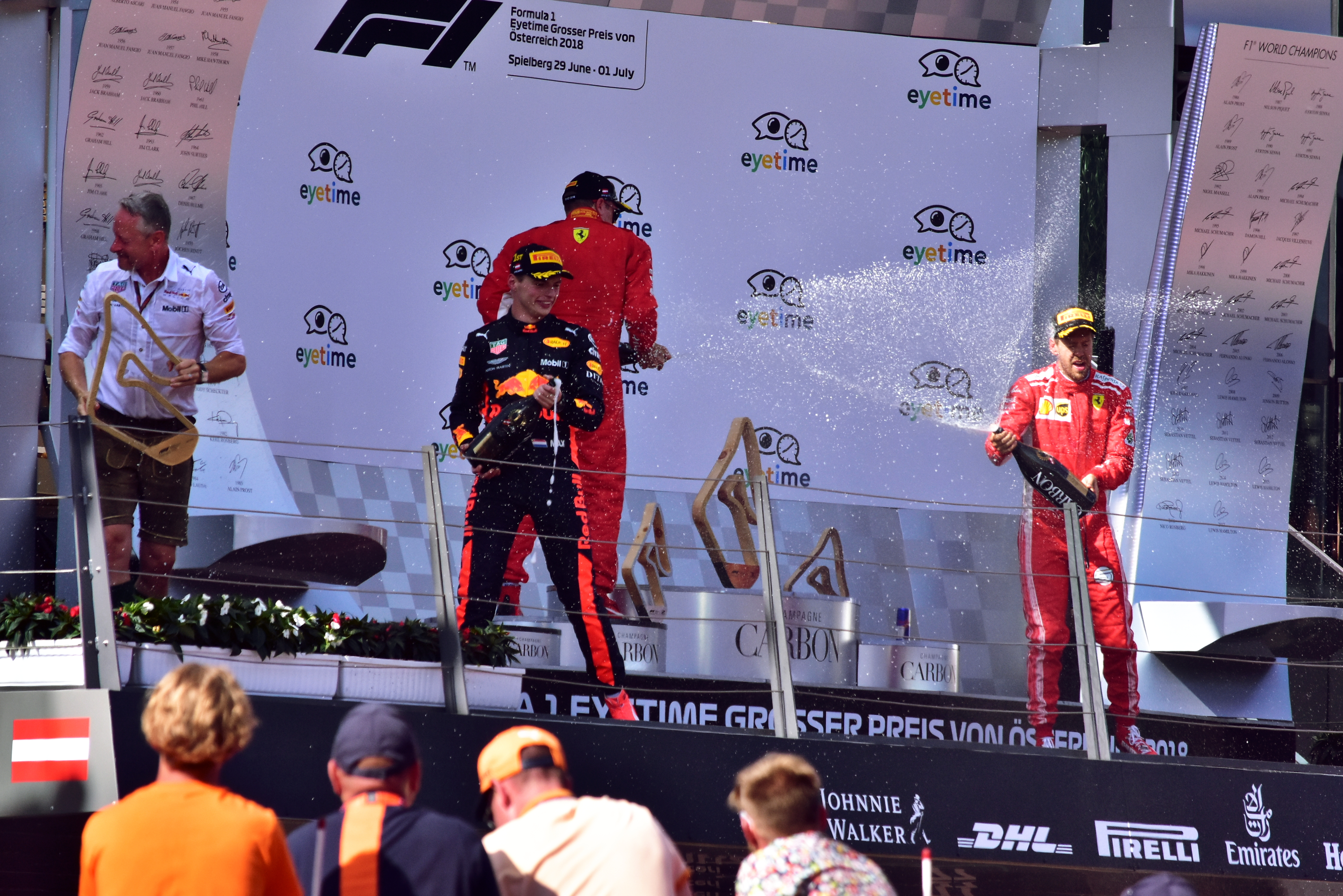
Verstappen celebrating on the podium with Kimi Räikkönen and Sebastian Vettel after winning the 2018 Austrian Grand Prix

In Canada, Verstappen topped all three practice sessions and qualified third, two-tenths off Sebastian Vettel in pole position. He eventually finished third and set the fastest lap of the race. The following race in France brought him second place. In Austria—Red Bull's home track, he started fourth on the grid, passed Kimi Räikkönen before taking advantage of retirement from Valtteri Bottas and a botched pit-stop strategy by Lewis Hamilton, who later had to retire from fourth place, to claim the fourth race victory of his career. In Britain, Verstappen was plagued by issues, finishing the first practice session early due to a gearbox problem and crashing in the second practice session before retiring from the race due to a brake problem. He would then finish fourth in Germany after strategy errors let a recovering Hamilton get past him as he went on to win the race. Verstappen ended the first half of the season with a retirement in Hungary and was narrowly behind his teammate in the championship due to his own recent resurgence and Ricciardo's unreliability.

Verstappen enjoyed a very strong second half of the season, achieving podium finishes in Belgium, Singapore, Japan and the United States, the latter of which he achieved second place having started from 18th on the grid due to a suspension failure in qualifying. Following the qualifying session at the Mexican Grand Prix, Verstappen revealed that a mechanical problem with his Red Bull under braking cost him any chance of becoming the youngest-ever Formula One pole-sitter. As a result, Ricciardo beat Verstappen to pole position by just 0.026 seconds. Verstappen had a better start than Ricciardo and took the lead of the race into the first corner, overtaking the fast-starting Mercedes of Lewis Hamilton. Verstappen earned his fifth career win in Mexico. He was poised to win the 2018 Brazilian Grand Prix, having overtaken Räikkönen, Vettel, Bottas, and Hamilton. However, he collided with Force India driver Esteban Ocon who was trying to unlap himself on faster tyres. Ocon received a 10-second stop-and-go penalty for the incident. After the collision with Ocon, Verstappen finished in second place behind Hamilton. During an argument with Ocon after the race, Verstappen pushed the Force India driver, for which he was given two days of "public service" as a penalty by the FIA. He then finished his season with another podium as he finished third in Abu Dhabi. Verstappen ended the season in fourth place in the championship with 249 points, claiming two wins, eleven podium finishes, and two fastest laps.

==== 2019–2020: Dominating teammates ====
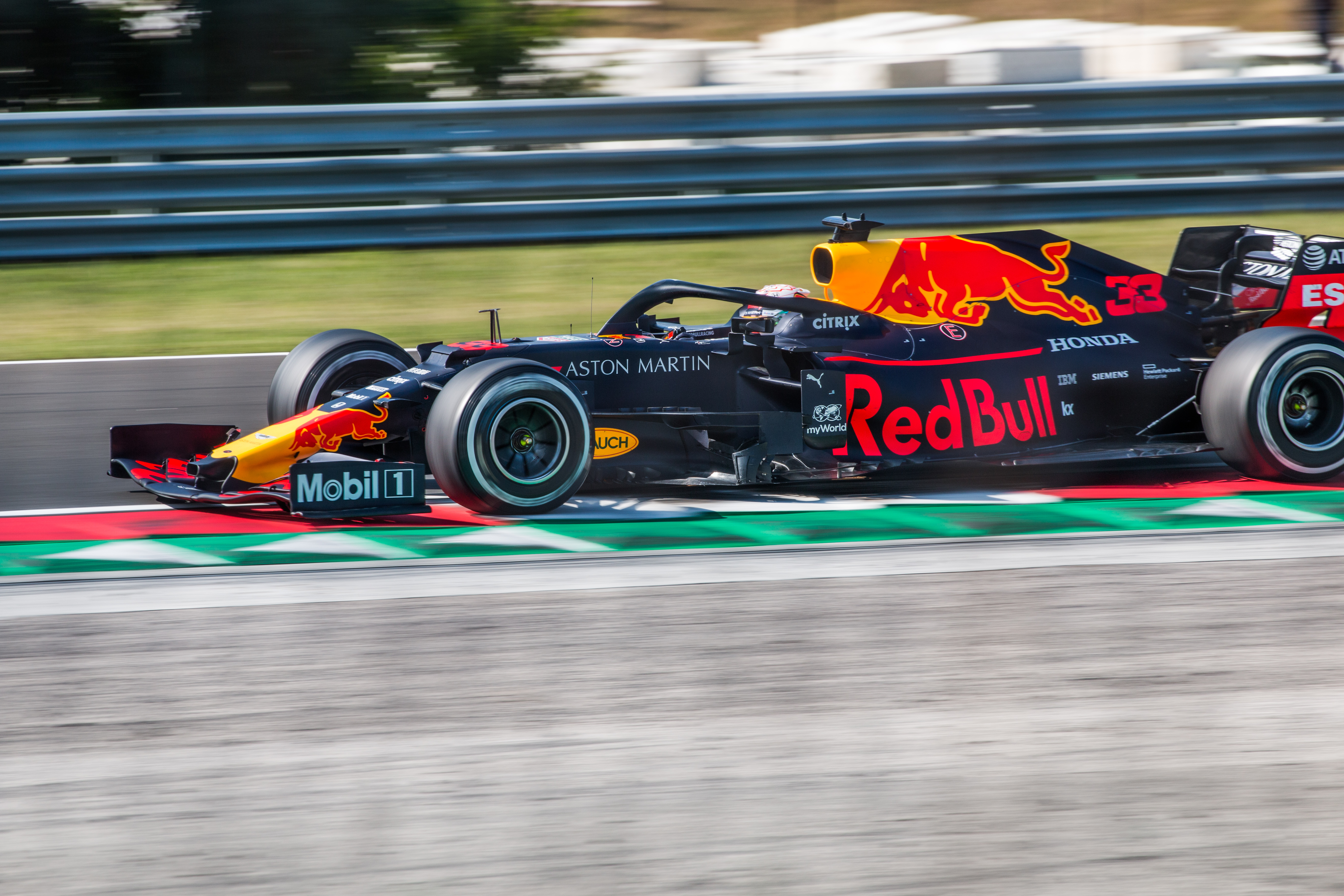
Verstappen at the 2019 Hungarian Grand Prix, where he started on pole position for the first time in his career

In 2019, Red Bull switched from Renault to Honda power units. After Ricciardo moved to the Renault team for 2019, Verstappen was joined at Red Bull by Pierre Gasly. Verstappen qualified in fourth and finished third in Australia, the first podium finish for a Honda-powered driver since the 2008 British Grand Prix. Verstappen was on course for a second third-place finish in Bahrain before a late safety car prevented him from overtaking Charles Leclerc's ailing Ferrari, keeping him in fourth place. Two more fourth-place finishes followed in China and Azerbaijan, and a podium in Spain in third place. In Monaco, Verstappen qualified in third place. He was released into the path of Valtteri Bottas during the drivers' pit stops, gaining second place but receiving a 5-second penalty as a result. Verstappen crossed the line in second place but was demoted to fourth by the penalty.

In Canada, Verstappen's final lap in the second qualifying session was hampered by a red flag brought out by Kevin Magnussen's crash. This caused Verstappen to qualify 11th and start the race in ninth place. He later recovered to finish fifth. In France he started and finished in fourth place. In Austria, Verstappen started third but suffered a poor start, dropping down to eighth. After a charge towards the front, he made his way up to second before controversially passing Leclerc for the lead of the race with three laps to go. This marked the first Honda-powered race victory since the 2006 Hungarian Grand Prix. In Britain, Verstappen, running in third place, was hit from behind during an overtake attempt by Sebastian Vettel and spun into the gravel. Verstappen was able to continue and crossed the line in fifth place.

The wet and chaotic German Grand Prix began similarly to the race in Austria for Verstappen, as a poor start caused him to fall behind. However, he would inherit the lead midway through the race after a crash by race leader Hamilton. Verstappen would go on to extend his lead after the track began to dry, claiming his second victory of the season. In Hungary, he claimed his maiden pole position—becoming the first Dutch driver to do so—and led most of the race before being passed in the closing laps by Hamilton, who had made another stop for fresh tyres in a gamble to catch the leader.

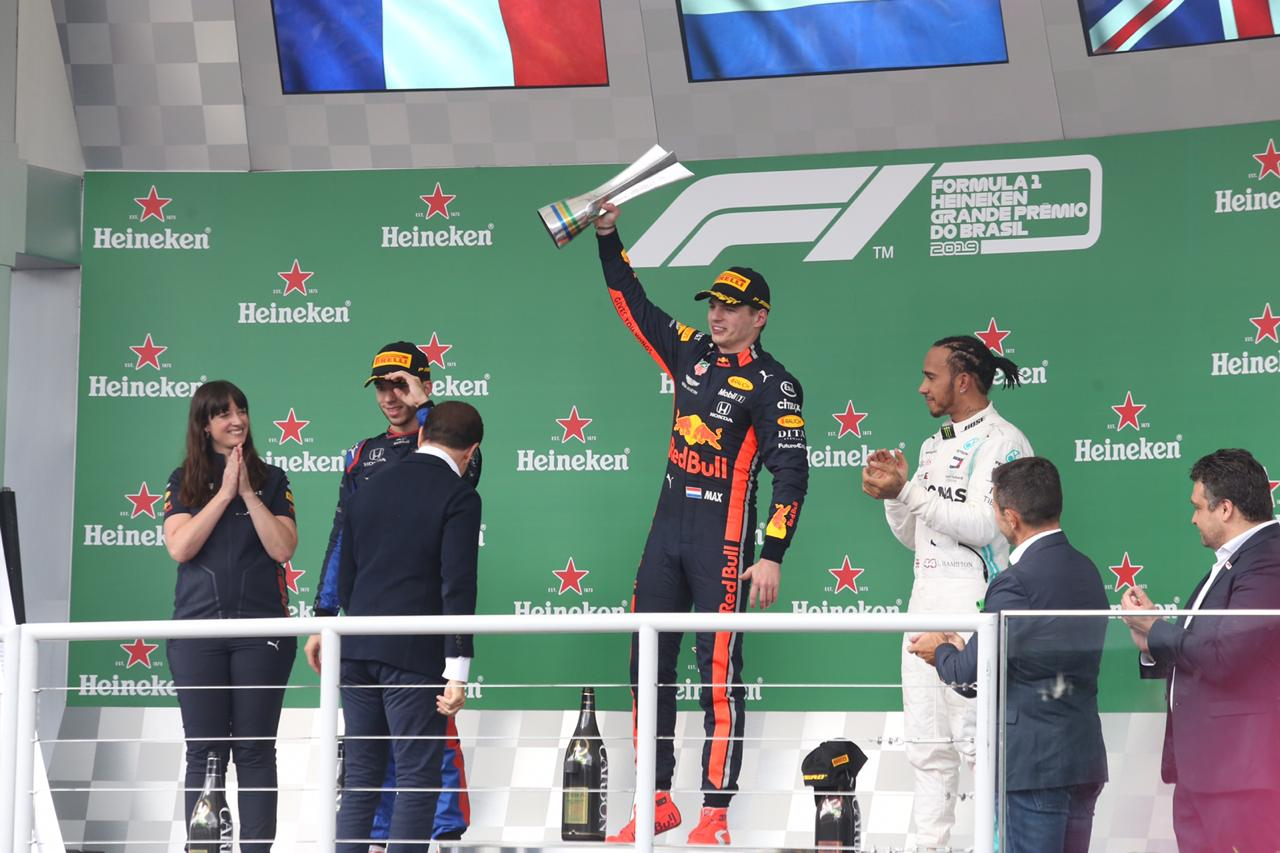
Verstappen on the podium after winning the 2019 Brazilian Grand Prix

Before the Belgian Grand Prix, Verstappen received a new teammate in Alexander Albon after Pierre Gasly was demoted back to Toro Rosso. In the race, Verstappen had a poor start and collided with Kimi Räikkönen at the first corner, resulting in suspension damage and causing Verstappen's first retirement of the season. In Italy, he did not set a time during qualifying after his car lost power in Q1, but he was already required to start from the back of the grid due to an engine component penalty. After damaging his front wing on the first lap, he recovered to finish the race in eighth place. Third and fourth-place finishes followed in Singapore and Russia respectively. After suffering damage in a first-lap collision with Charles Leclerc in Japan, Verstappen suffered his second retirement of the season.

In Mexico, he qualified in first place after setting the fastest lap-time of the session, before being handed a grid penalty for ignoring yellow flags after a crash by Valtteri Bottas. Verstappen suffered a puncture early in the race after making contact with Bottas, falling to the back of the field before eventually recovering to sixth place. A third-place finish in the United States followed, before Verstappen took the second pole position of his career with a 1:07.508 pole lap time in Brazil. In a chaotic race, he passed Lewis Hamilton for the lead on two occasions before going on to claim his third victory of the season. Verstappen ended the season with a second-place finish in Abu Dhabi. Verstappen finished the 2019 season in third place in the championship with 278 points. He claimed three race victories, nine podium finishes, two pole positions, and three fastest laps.

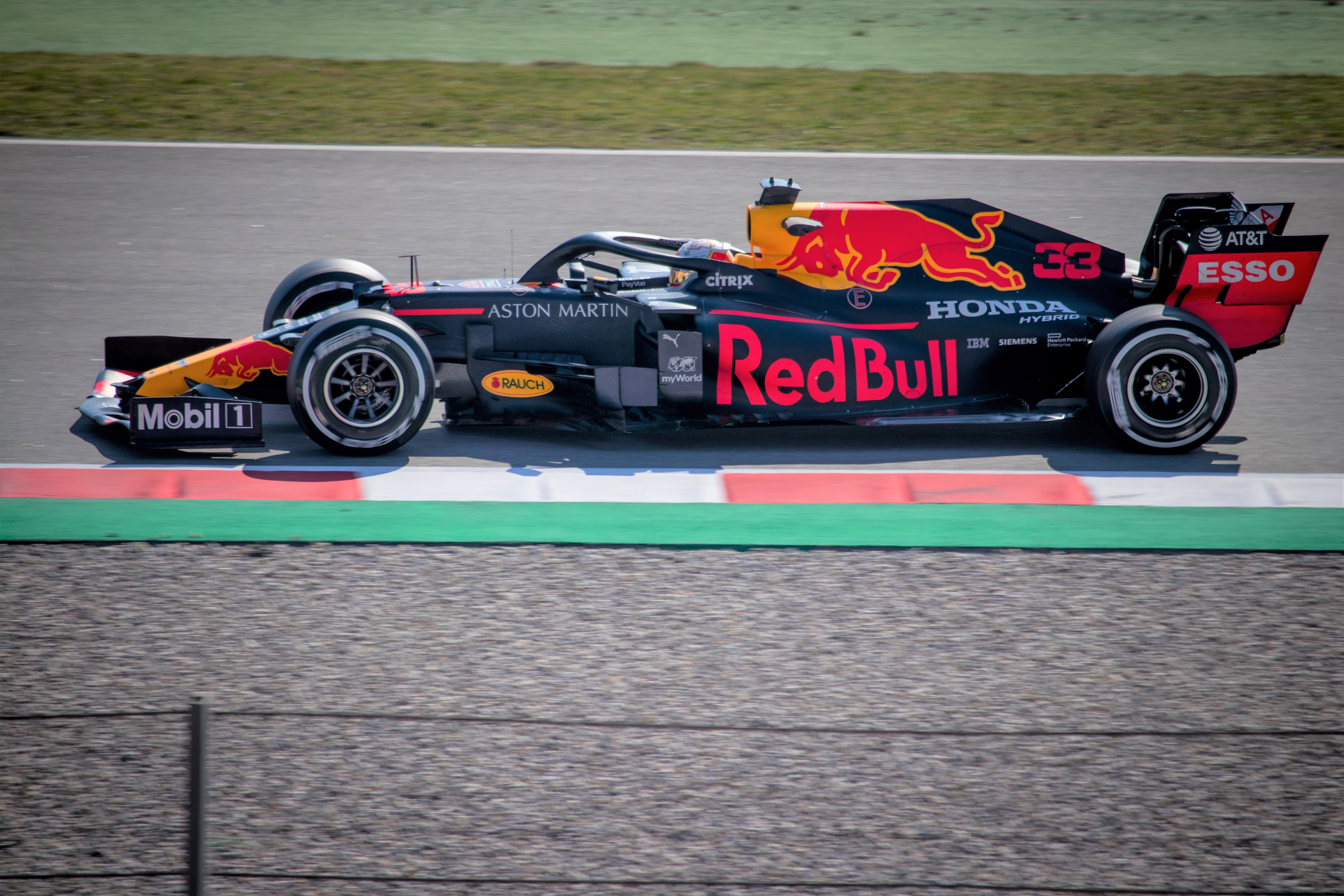
Verstappen at pre-season testing in 2020

Verstappen continued to race for Red Bull in 2020, alongside Albon. At the 2020 Austrian Grand Prix, he started second, but retired early in the race after a flywheel-related problem caused an electronic issue within the power unit. Honda introduced countermeasures in response to the retirement. At the 2020 Hungarian Grand Prix, he crashed in wet conditions during the formation lap while he was on his way to the starting grid, but he was able to drive the car back to the grid where his mechanics fixed the suspension of the car in the short time that was left before the start of the race. After the repairs, Verstappen progressed from seventh place on the grid to second place by the end of the race. Verstappen won the 70th Anniversary Grand Prix at Silverstone, having started from fourth.

Verstappen clinched second place at the Spanish Grand Prix, after qualifying in third. At the 2020 Belgian Grand Prix, he scored a podium in third place, following his third place on the starting grid. He suffered from two consecutive DNFs at the Italian and Tuscan Grands Prix after which he lost second place in the Championship. At the Russian Grand Prix, Verstappen finished the race in second, his seventh podium finish of 2020. At the Eifel Grand Prix, Verstappen finished in second after qualifying in third. He also managed to get the fastest lap of the race. At the Portuguese Grand Prix, Verstappen qualified third, however a poor first lap meant that he dropped back down the order to fifth place. He recovered to third and took his 40th podium in Formula 1. At the Emilia Romagna Grand Prix, Verstappen looked set to claim second due to Valtteri Bottas' ailing Mercedes slowing down, but a sudden puncture denied him any chance of a podium finish; Verstappen spun, resulting in his fourth retirement of the 2020 season.

During Free Practice for the Portuguese Grand Prix, Verstappen was criticised for comments he made on the team radio after a collision with Lance Stroll, where he used the words "retard" and "mongol" in response to the clash. Verstappen admitted following the session that the word choices he used were "not correct". The Mongolian government and the Mongol identity asked Verstappen to apologise for the comments; the Mongolian government also urged the FIA to take action on the comments he made. Verstappen finished the 2020 season in third place in the championship with 214 points. He claimed two race victories, eleven podium finishes, one pole position, and three fastest laps.

==== 2021: Successful title battle with Hamilton ====
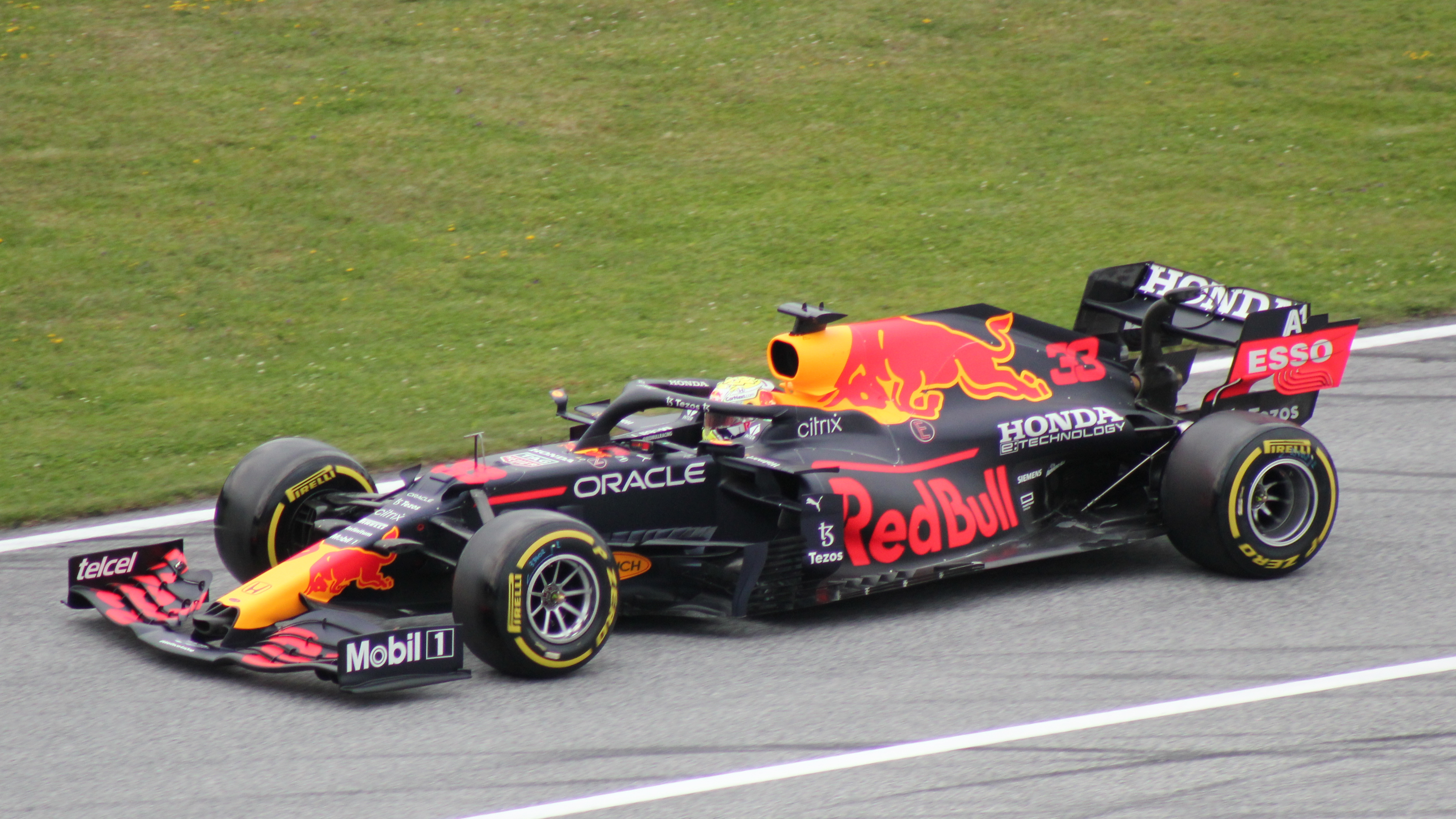
Verstappen at the 2021 Austrian Grand Prix

Verstappen won his first F1 championship in 2021. At the Bahrain Grand Prix, Verstappen topped all the practice sessions and subsequently took a career fourth pole position. This was the first time he achieved back-to-back pole positions. He fought Lewis Hamilton for the race victory, and on lap 53 Verstappen overtook Hamilton, but went off track whilst doing so, resulting in him being instructed by race control to let Hamilton back into the lead and ultimately finishing second behind Hamilton. At the next race, the Emilia Romagna Grand Prix, Verstappen qualified third with teammate Sergio Pérez second, marking the first time he was out-qualified by a teammate since the 2019 Italian Grand Prix. At the race start, Verstappen was able to pass both Pérez and pole-sitter Hamilton to take the lead. He remained in the lead after the first round of pit stops as well as the restart, following the race being suspended on lap 33. Rival Hamilton finished second, reducing his championship lead over Verstappen to one point.

In the following Portuguese Grand Prix, Verstappen finished second after a long battle with Hamilton. At the Spanish Grand Prix, the battle between Verstappen and Hamilton continued, with Hamilton employing a faster two-stop strategy versus Verstappen's one-stop race. This provided Hamilton the advantage of faster tyres, allowing him to overtake Verstappen with several laps remaining in the race. Hamilton took the victory, with Verstappen taking second and the fastest lap, increasing Hamilton's championship lead to 14 points.

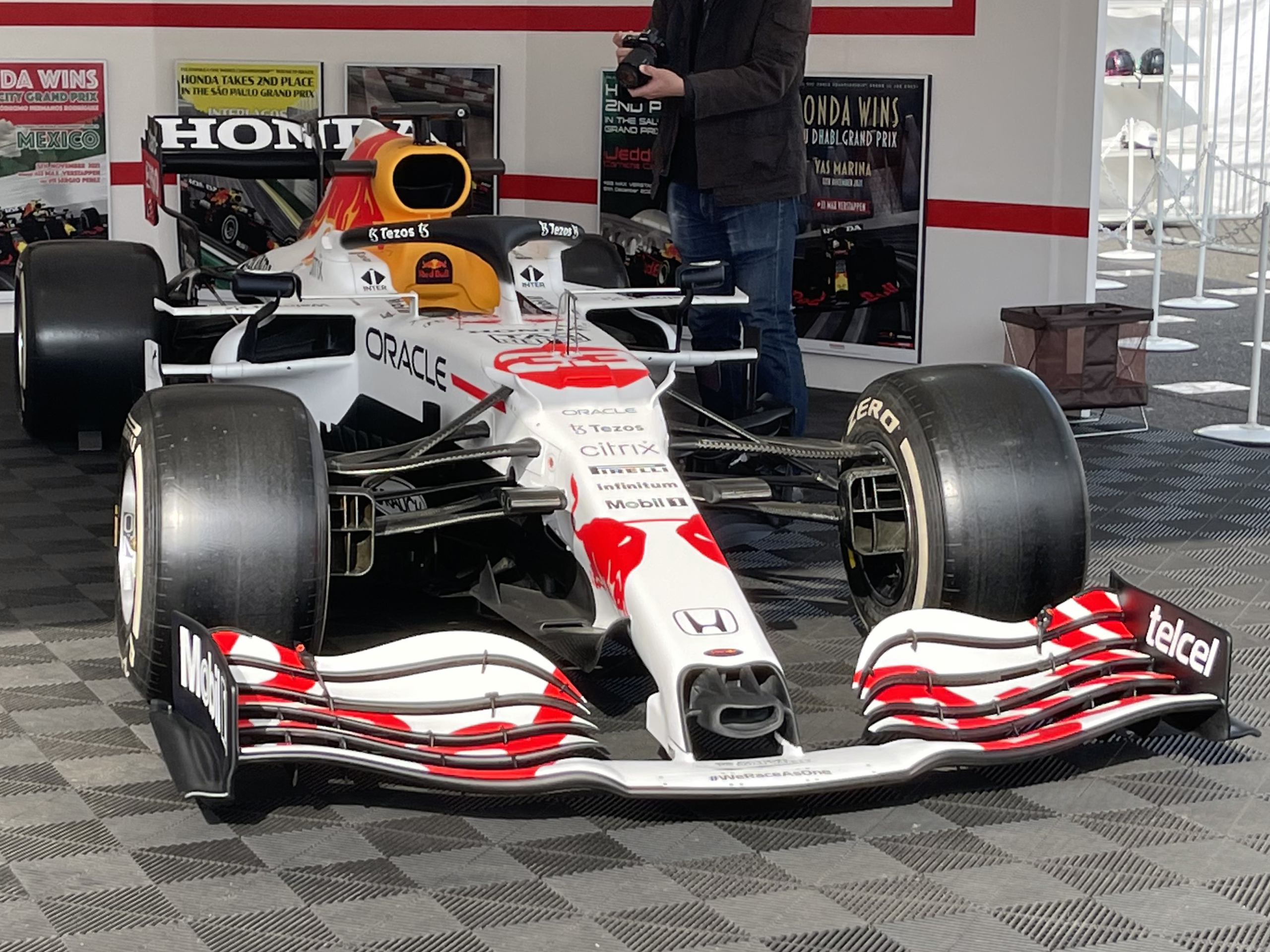
Verstappen's 2021 title winning RB16B in Japanese colors white and red, as a tribute to their engine supplier Honda

At the next race in Monaco, Verstappen qualified second behind Charles Leclerc, but Leclerc suffered a driveshaft failure on the way to the grid and was unable to start the race. Verstappen controlled the race from the front on the way to victory. Hamilton (who qualified seventh) finished seventh, though claiming an extra championship point by setting the fastest race lap. The result enabled Verstappen to become the first Dutch driver to lead the World Drivers' Championship, by a margin of four points over Hamilton. At the Azerbaijan Grand Prix, Verstappen qualified third behind Leclerc and Hamilton. Verstappen and Hamilton passed Leclerc in the opening laps before Verstappen took the lead by way of a faster pitstop. Verstappen would comfortably hold the lead until lap 46 when he suffered a tyre failure causing him to crash at high speed and retire. A mistake by Hamilton on the restart dropped him to last place, meaning Verstappen maintained his championship lead.

Verstappen took pole for the French Grand Prix. Verstappen's mistake on the first lap allowed Hamilton to take the lead which Verstappen retook during the pit stop phase. Verstappen pitted for a second time from the lead and set after the Mercedes duo, overtaking Hamilton for the lead on lap 52 of 53. He also took the fastest lap point, extending his championship lead to twelve points and achieving the first hat-trick of his career. Verstappen clinched pole position again at the Styrian Grand Prix and led the race from start to finish, to give him his fourth win of the season and further extend his lead to 18 points.

Verstappen took pole position at the Austrian Grand Prix, led every lap from start to finish, set the fastest lap, and won the race for his first career grand slam, being the youngest to do so. With the win, Verstappen also became the first driver to win three races in three consecutive weekends, starting at the French Grand Prix on 20 June, then the Styrian Grand Prix on 27 June and ending with the Austrian Grand Prix on 4 July. At the next race; the British Grand Prix, Verstappen was involved in a high-speed collision at the Copse corner with Hamilton on the first lap. This resulted in a 51 g (500 m/s^{2}; 1,600 ft/s^{2}) impact with the barrier. He was taken to the Silverstone circuit's medical centre after the crash and was then taken to Coventry hospital for precautionary checks and further assessment, before eventually being discharged at 22:00 local time on Sunday night. Hamilton would go on to win the race, reducing Verstappen's lead in the championship to eight points. At the next race, the Hungarian Grand Prix, Verstappen's car suffered damage in a multi-car collision on lap 1, where Mercedes driver Valtteri Bottas was deemed at fault. He ended the race in tenth which was promoted to ninth after Sebastian Vettel was disqualified. The outcome of the race allowed Hamilton to take the lead of the championship.

Following the summer break, Verstappen qualified on pole at the Belgian Grand Prix, ahead of Williams driver George Russell in second and Lewis Hamilton in third. The race was run for three laps, all behind the safety car, with the race official race results taken from the running order at the end of the first lap, with Hamilton and Verstappen both retaining their qualifying positions. As less than 75% of the race distance was completed, half points were awarded, resulting in Verstappen closing the gap to Hamilton to three points. At the Dutch Grand Prix Verstappen again qualified on pole, beating Hamilton by 0.038 seconds. During the race Verstappen was able to fend off attacks from both Mercedes drivers to take the win, taking the lead in the Drivers' Championship by three points. For the Russian Grand Prix, Verstappen was required to start at the back of the grid for exceeding his quota of power unit components. He made his way back up the field, and after taking an early pit stop for intermediate tyres late in the race, he finished second. At the Turkish Grand Prix, Verstappen qualified second with Bottas on pole. With the race being run in wet conditions and the drivers on intermediate tyres the whole race, Verstappen finished second behind Bottas, taking the lead in the Drivers' Championship by six points as Hamilton finished fifth.

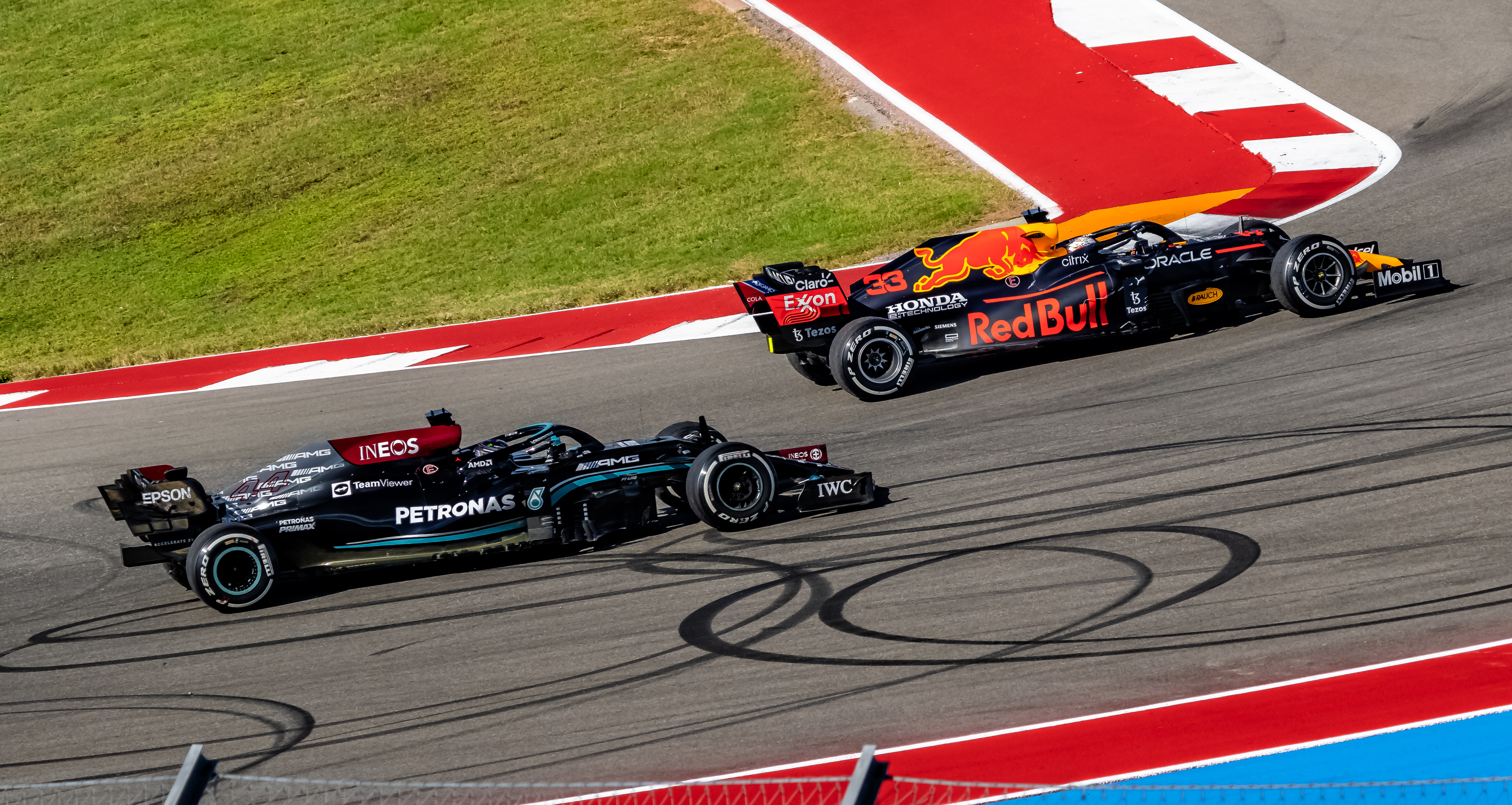
Verstappen battling with Lewis Hamilton for the lead at the 2021 United States Grand Prix

At the United States Grand Prix, Verstappen took pole position in qualifying, edging Hamilton by 0.209 seconds. Verstappen won the race and extended his lead in the Drivers' Championship to twelve points as Hamilton finished second with the fastest lap. At the 2021 Mexico City Grand Prix, Verstappen qualified third with a gap to pole-sitter Bottas of 0.350 seconds. Verstappen's main rival Hamilton qualified second. At the start, Verstappen took the lead from Bottas and Hamilton into turn 1, and won the race; and as a result extended his lead in the championship to 19 points.

Verstappen and Hamilton each entered the final round of the championship—the Abu Dhabi Grand Prix at Yas Marina—on exactly 369.5 points, with Verstappen leading on countback. Verstappen qualified on pole position by nearly four-tenths of a second, but had a slow start and lost the lead to Hamilton into turn one. He attempted to re-pass Hamilton at turn six, who cut the track but was not penalised and maintained the lead. The stewards deemed that no advantage was gained, amidst Verstappen's and Red Bull's complaints. Verstappen was trailing Hamilton by over 10 seconds until a safety car was deployed with five laps remaining. The ending of the safety car and subsequent resumption of the race for one single lap caused significant controversy; race director Michael Masi allowed all lapped cars between Hamilton and Verstappen to unlap themselves, but no other. He also restarted the race for the next lap in supposed contravention to the rulebook. Verstappen passed Hamilton at turn five of the final lap of the final race to become the first World Drivers' Champion from the Netherlands and the 34th overall. Mercedes' protests were dismissed by the stewards and Verstappen was provisionally confirmed as world champion, pending any appeal. Having initially lodged their intention, Mercedes later decided not to submit an appeal of the race results. Verstappen was named the best driver of the season by Autosport and The Race, whilst also topping polls of fellow drivers and team principals. Mark Hughes of Motor Sport also ranked Verstappen first, describing his season as a "stunning combination of speed and racecraft, totally fearless, incredible tenacity and ability to comeback from adversity".

==== 2022: Defending the championship ====
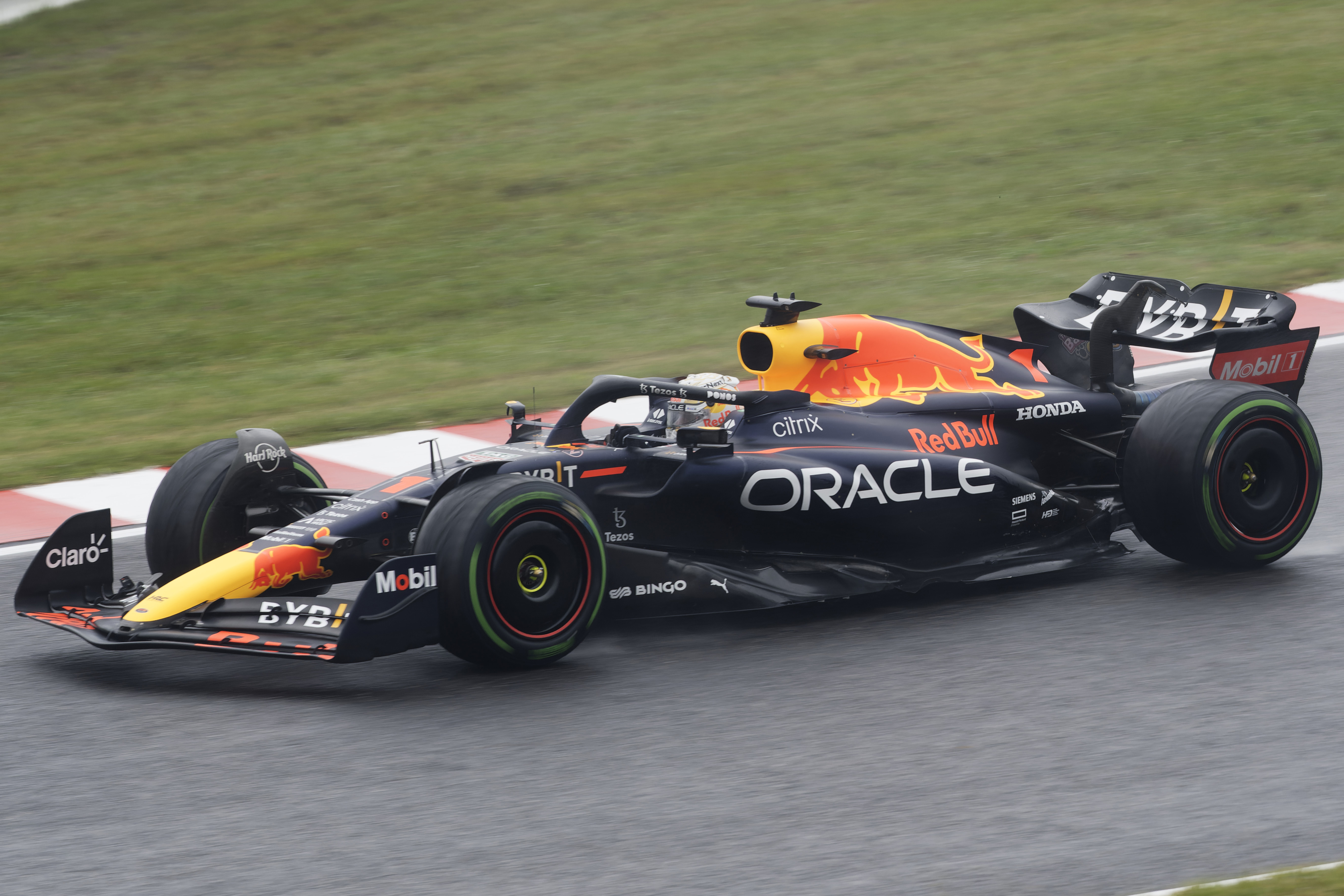
Verstappen at the 2022 Japanese Grand Prix, where he won his second World Drivers' Championship

In March 2022, Verstappen signed a five-year contract extension with Red Bull Racing for the 2023 to 2028 seasons. From this season onward, he would use the number 1 instead of his regular number 33 as the reigning world champion. Verstappen retired from second place at the season-opening Bahrain Grand Prix with a fuel system issue. He won the Saudi Arabian Grand Prix, having benefited from a pit stop during safety car conditions to pass teammate and pole-sitter Pérez, but suffered another fuel-related retirement from second place at the Australian Grand Prix. This left him 46 points behind championship leader Charles Leclerc after three races. Verstappen won the next three races; including sprint victory and a grand slam at the Emilia Romagna Grand Prix, won from third on the grid at the Miami Grand Prix while profiting from Leclerc's retirement at the Spanish Grand Prix to take the championship lead. Further wins came at the Azerbaijan Grand Prix, where Leclerc again retired, and from pole position at the Canadian Grand Prix. Verstappen qualified second at the British Grand Prix, but floor damage from running over debris harmed his pace and resulted in a seventh-place finish.

Verstappen took pole position at the Austrian Grand Prix and won the sprint, but was overtaken by Leclerc in the race and finished second, reducing his championship lead over Leclerc to 38 points. Following this, Verstappen went on to win five races consecutively. Pole-sitter Leclerc crashed out of the French Grand Prix, allowing Verstappen to win. Power unit issues meant he qualified tenth for the Hungarian Grand Prix, but overtakes in the opening laps and pit stop undercuts meant he went on to take victory, despite briefly losing the lead after a spin. He set the fastest qualifying time at the Belgian Grand Prix but was demoted to 14th on the grid with a power unit components penalty. Despite this, he progressed to the race lead by lap 12 and went on to win. He took pole position and his 30th race victory at his home race, the Dutch Grand Prix, and then won from seventh on the grid at the Italian Grand Prix.

Verstappen's winning streak was ended at the Singapore Grand Prix. He ran out of fuel in qualifying and started the race eighth. He lost places at the start and later had to make an extra pit stop due to a tyre lock-up, finishing seventh. Victory from pole at the shortened Japanese Grand Prix gave him a 113-point lead in the standings with four races remaining, securing him his second World Drivers' Championship. He won the next two races, the United States and Mexico City Grands Prix, finished sixth at the São Paulo Grand Prix after a collision with Lewis Hamilton, and won the season-ending Abu Dhabi Grand Prix from pole. Abu Dhabi was his fifteenth victory of the year, breaking the record of thirteen race wins in a season shared by Michael Schumacher in 2004 and Sebastian Vettel in 2013. He won the championship with 454 points, beating Lewis Hamilton's 2019 record of 413.

==== 2023: Record-breaking third title ====
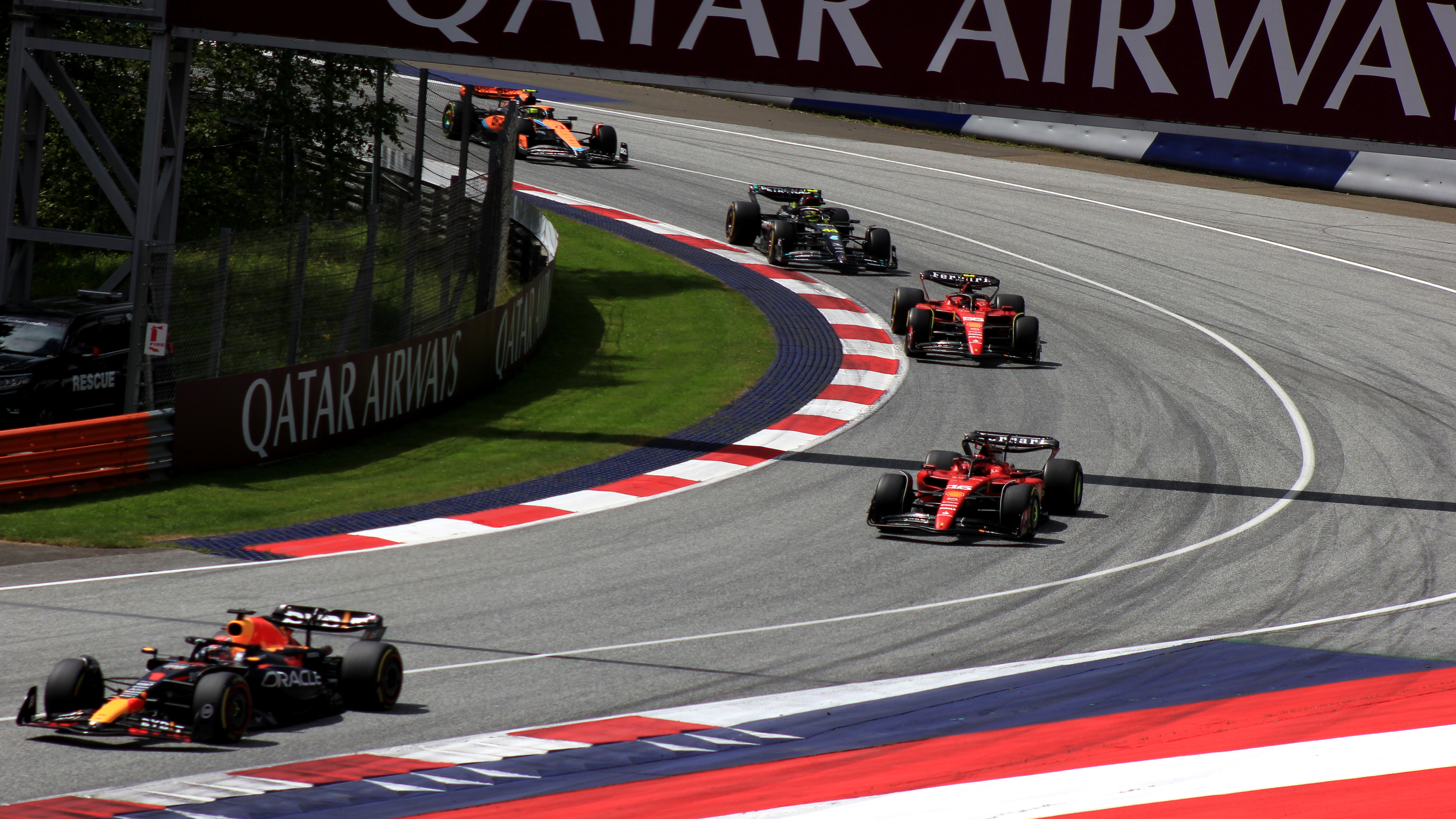
Verstappen leading the race at the 2023 Austrian Grand Prix

Verstappen remained with Red Bull alongside Sergio Pérez for the 2023 season. His campaign began with a win from pole at the Bahrain Grand Prix. A driveshaft failure in qualifying at the Saudi Arabian Grand Prix resulted in a 15th-place start, but he gained positions in the race to finish second behind Pérez. He again won from pole at the Australian Grand Prix despite losing positions to the Mercedes drivers during the race, but finished second to Pérez, who made a safety car pit stop, at the Azerbaijan Grand Prix.

After this began Verstappen's record-breaking win streak. He started ninth at the Miami Grand Prix as red flags in qualifying aborted his lap but passed the drivers ahead including pole-sitter Pérez to win. The next four races, the Monaco, Spanish, Canadian and Austrian Grands Prix, were won comfortably from pole position by Verstappen, including Red Bull's 100th victory in Canada, as well as a sprint win in Austria. He took pole at the British Grand Prix but briefly lost the lead to Lando Norris at the start before regaining the position to win. He qualified 0.003 seconds behind Lewis Hamilton at the Hungarian Grand Prix, but overtook him at the first corner and went on to take victory. He claimed pole and the win in the Belgian Grand Prix sprint and set the fastest qualifying time, but started the race sixth due to an engine component penalty. He went on to overtake Pérez to win the race. He won from pole at the rain-affected Dutch Grand Prix and was victorious again at the Italian Grand Prix despite qualifying behind Carlos Sainz Jr. This victory marked his tenth consecutive win, breaking Sebastian Vettel's record of nine from 2013, and Red Bull's fifteenth consecutive win, a record previously held by McLaren with eleven in 1988. Both Red Bulls were eliminated in Q2 at the Singapore Grand Prix and were unable to make an impression in the race, with Verstappen and Pérez finishing fifth and eighth respectively, ending the winning streak. This would be the only break in Verstappen's success, as he went on to win the remaining seven races of the season. His victory from pole at the Japanese Grand Prix gave Red Bull their sixth Constructors' Championship title.

Verstappen clinched his third World Drivers' Championship title at the Qatar Grand Prix sprint despite finishing second to Oscar Piastri, then won the race from pole. He won the United States Grand Prix despite having started sixth due to a lap time deletion in qualifying. He qualified behind both Ferraris at the Mexico City Grand Prix but passed both drivers to claim the win. He took pole and victory at the São Paulo Grand Prix and won the sprint having overtook pole-sitter Lando Norris at the first turn. He started behind Charles Leclerc at the Las Vegas Grand Prix and received a penalty for forcing him off the track, but Verstappen reclaimed the lead to win. His pole and victory at the season-ending Abu Dhabi Grand Prix was his nineteenth win of the year, breaking his own record of fifteen from 2022. He scored 575 points, more than double that of second-placed Pérez and beating his own points-scoring record from 2022.

==== 2024: Fourth title despite Red Bull struggles ====
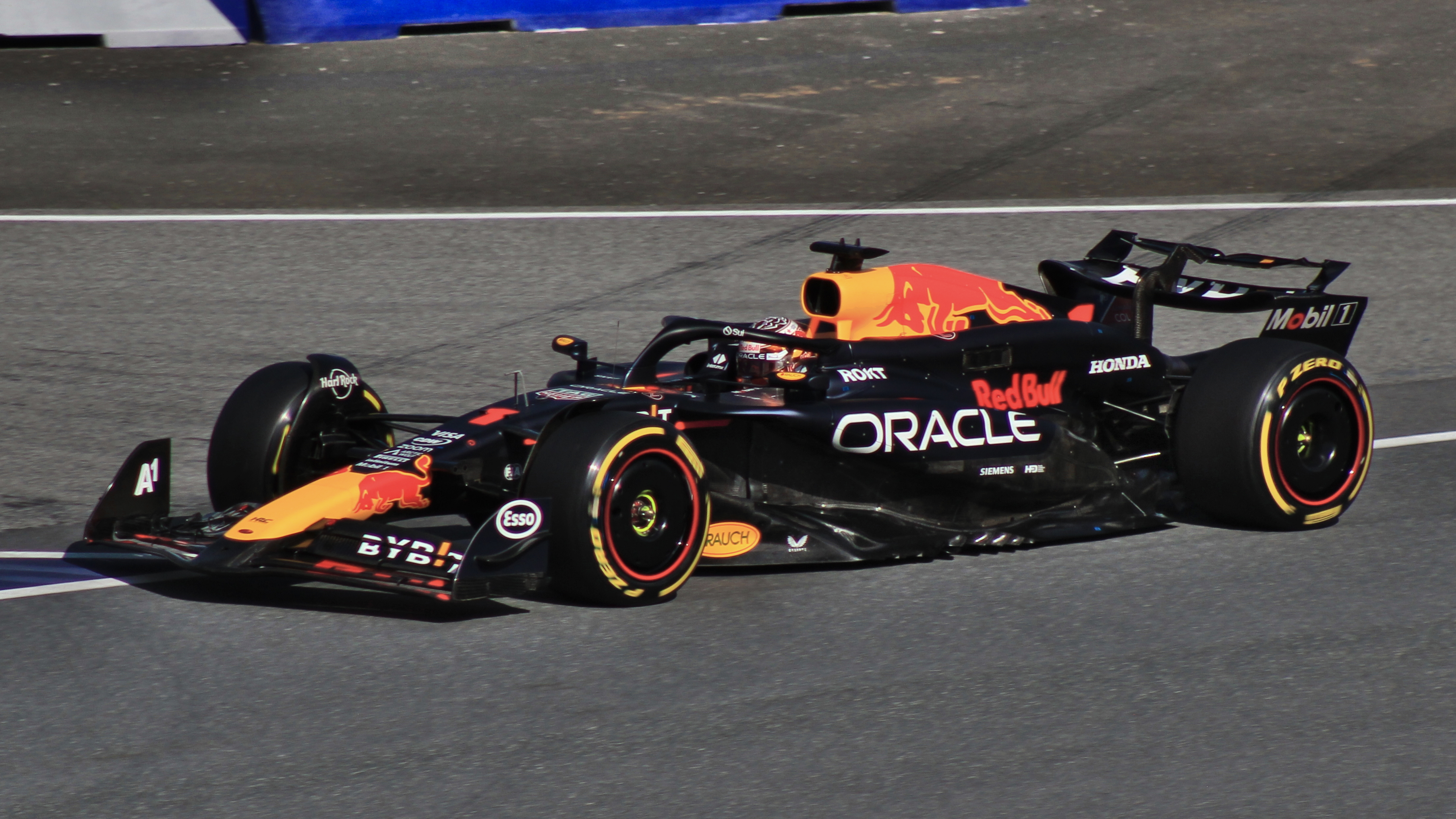
Verstappen (pictured during the Austrian Grand Prix) won seven of the opening 10 rounds in 2024.

Verstappen began the 2024 season with his fifth career grand slam at the Bahrain Grand Prix and followed this with another pole and victory at the Saudi Arabian Grand Prix, his 100th Formula One podium. He took pole again at the Australian Grand Prix but retired on lap 4, his first retirement since the 2022 edition of the race, with a brake fire, ending his nine-race winning streak and 43 race-finishing streak. This was followed by a pole and win at the Japanese Grand Prix. He won the sprint at the Chinese Grand Prix after starting fourth, then claimed pole and victory in the race. He took another sprint win at the Miami Grand Prix and started on pole position, but lost the lead to Lando Norris during the pit stops and was unable to reclaim the place, finishing the race second. He matched Ayrton Senna's record of eight consecutive poles at the Emilia Romagna Grand Prix and converted this into his fifth victory of the season. His pole streak ended at the Monaco Grand Prix where he qualified and finished sixth; Verstappen commented that his RB20 was losing time to its rivals in low-speed corners.

Verstappen and George Russell set identical lap times in qualifying at the Canadian Grand Prix, but Russell started on pole position as he had set the lap time first. Both drivers were overtaken by Norris, but Verstappen later passed Russell then gained the lead from Norris during the pit stops to claim his 60th race win. He qualified second behind Norris at the Spanish Grand Prix but passed him at the start and then overtook Russell to win for the seventh time in 2024. Verstappen won the sprint from pole at the Austrian Grand Prix and then qualified fastest for the main race. He led most of the race but was challenged by Norris in the closing laps before the two drivers collided; Verstappen was handed a time penalty for causing the collision and finished the race fifth. He later commented that the crash did not affect his close friendship with Norris. He qualified fourth at the British Grand Prix and passed Norris in the closing laps to finish second behind Lewis Hamilton. He started third at the Hungarian Grand Prix but collided with Hamilton and went on to finish fifth. He criticised his team's race strategy and suggested that the RB20 was now behind the race-winning McLaren MCL38 on pace. Verstappen qualified fastest at the Belgian Grand Prix but started outside the top ten due to an engine component penalty. He recovered positions and was classified fourth in the race, extending his lead in the championship to 78 points over Norris going into the summer break.

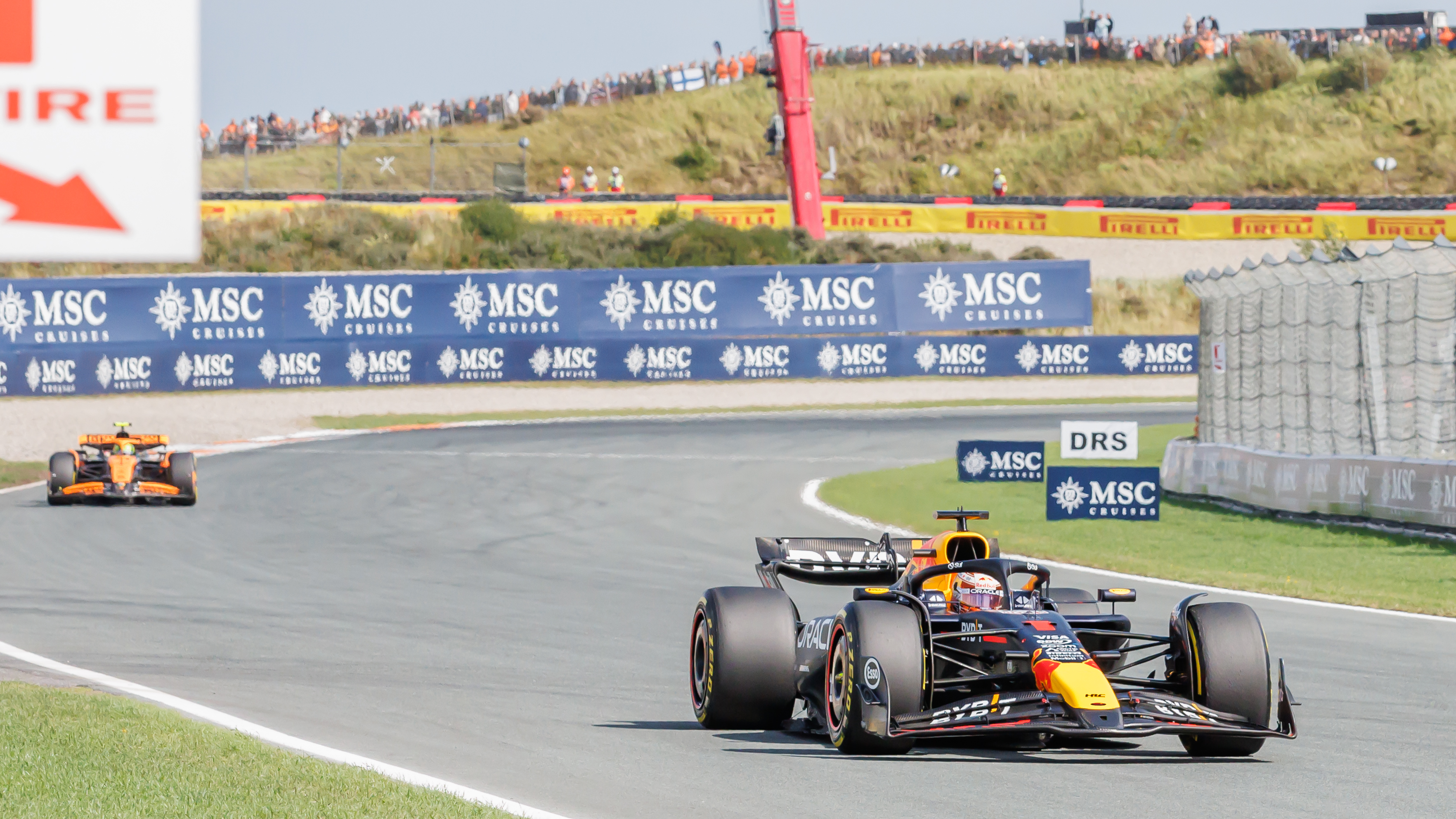
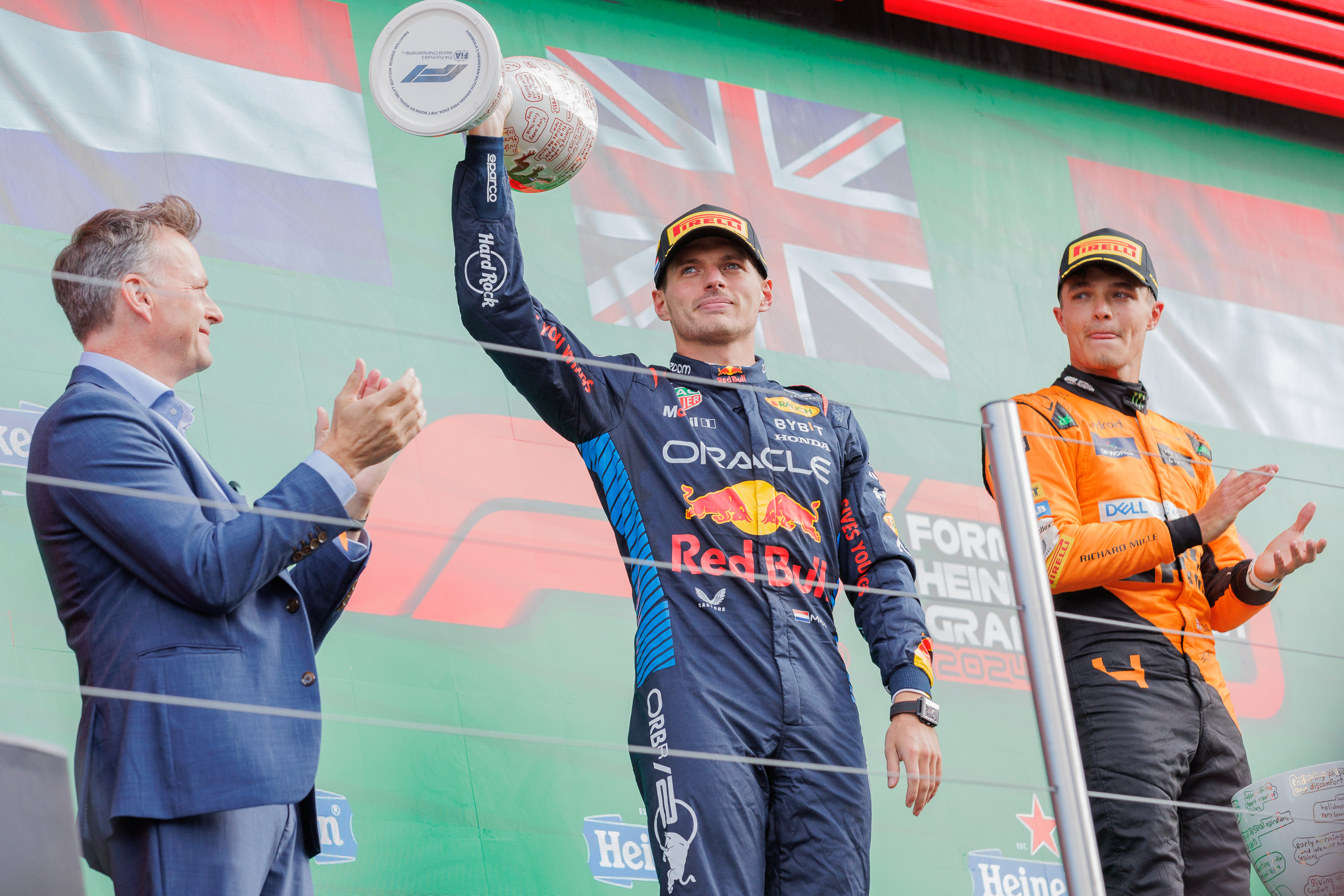
Verstappen led 17 laps and finished second to rival Norris at the Dutch Grand Prix.

At his home race, the Dutch Grand Prix, Verstappen qualified second behind Norris and gained the lead at the first corner, but was later overtaken by Norris and finished second. He qualified and finished outside the top four at both the Italian and Azerbaijan Grands Prix, after which Red Bull lost the lead of the Constructors' Championship to McLaren. He then finished second to Norris at the Singapore Grand Prix, reducing his championship advantage to 52 points. Verstappen described his car as "fucked" at the official press conference in Singapore, for which he received a punishment from the FIA to "accomplish some work of public interest". He responded by hosting an impromptu media session outside the press conference room in protest, and later suggested that the decision could push him to leave the sport. He won the sprint at the United States Grand Prix and was classified third in the race ahead of Norris, who was penalised for overtaking Verstappen off-track. This extended Verstappen's championship lead for the first time since the Belgian Grand Prix. He started second at the Mexico City Grand Prix but received 20 seconds worth of penalties for his driving during a battle for position with Norris, resulting in a sixth-place finish, reducing his championship lead to 47 points.

I mean honestly [Russell and Norris] could have got a 10-second penalty and [Verstappen] could have won by 30 seconds but it didn't matter. He was so calm about it; he was calculating. Every time he made a passing move. I mean he was exemplary. For me, this was a masterclass of how a racing driver reaches the pinnacle of his career and becomes a four-time World Champion.

— Eddie Jordan, speaking about Verstappen's victory at the 2024 São Paulo Grand Prix

Verstappen was classified fourth in the São Paulo Grand Prix sprint after receiving a virtual safety car infringement penalty, and started the race from 17th following an engine penalty, whilst Norris qualified on pole. He gained seven positions on the opening lap, with further places obtained via several crucial overtakes, as well as surviving the worsening conditions on his intermediate tyres until the red flag period. Following this—and his overtake for the lead on Ocon—Verstappen set ten of the eleven fastest laps of the race, with his quickest being 1.045 seconds quicker than any of his rivals; he won by a 19-second margin, increasing his championship lead to 62 points. Verstappen was lauded by drivers and critics for his drive; Giles Richards of The Guardian opined that his performance was "worthy of recognition in the pantheon of Formula One's wet-weather drives", describing him as a regenmeister (lit. 'rain master'). By finishing ahead of Norris at the subsequent Las Vegas Grand Prix, Verstappen secured his fourth world title with two races remaining. Winning eight Grands Prix in all, Andrew Benson of BBC Sport proclaimed it as a "towering achievement from a driver recognised as one of the all-time greats of Formula 1", describing his season as "almost flawless" whilst "not [having] the best car for the majority". Verstappen won the Qatar Grand Prix, leading every lap after having his pole position stripped for driving unnecessarily slowly in qualifying; the incident led to a widely publicised feud with George Russell. After the season-ending Abu Dhabi Grand Prix, Verstappen became the first driver to win a title driving for a third-placed team in the World Constructors' Championship since Nelson Piquet in 1983.

==== 2025: Runner-up to Norris ====
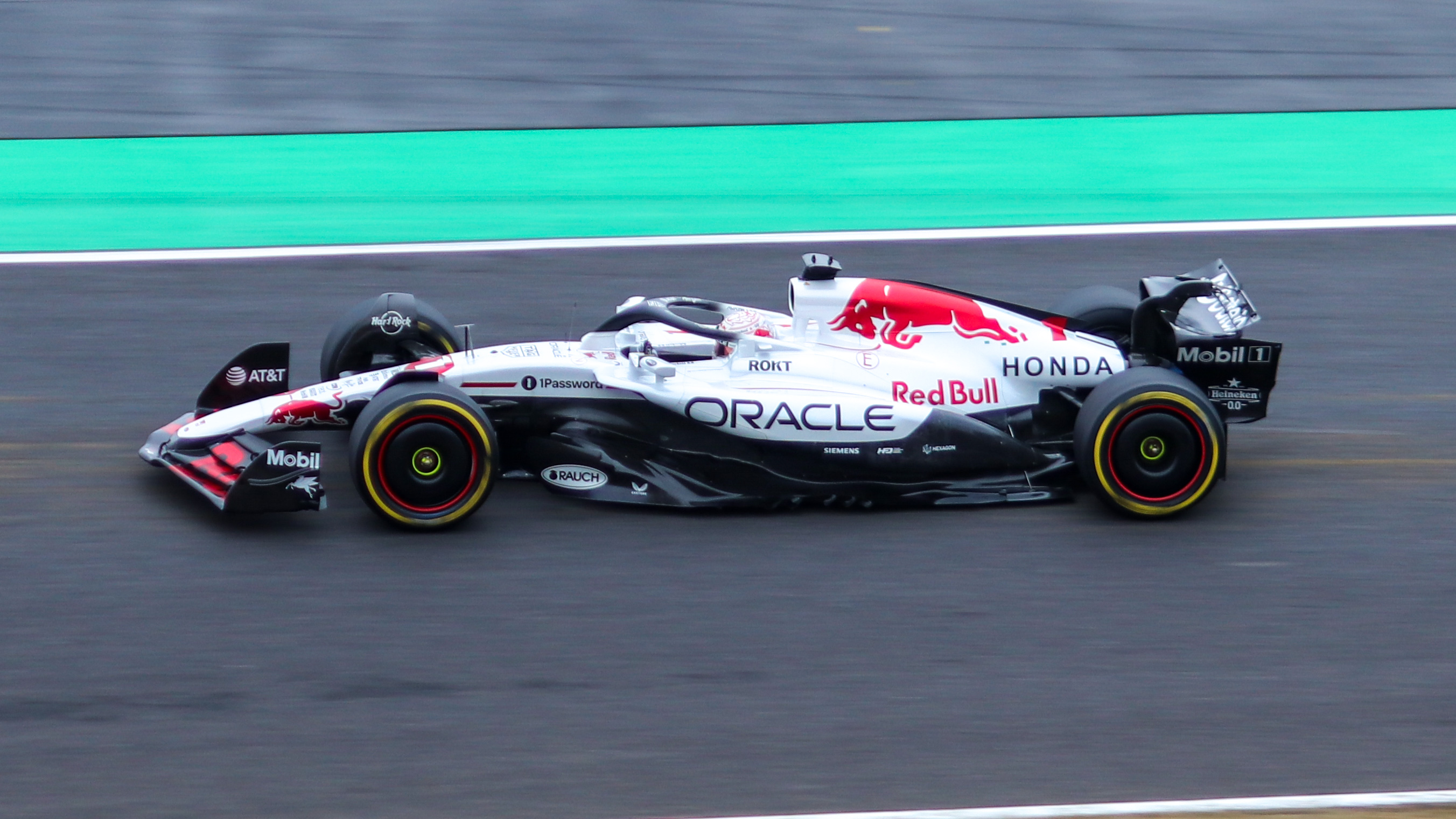
Verstappen received widespread acclaim for his surprise victory at the Japanese Grand Prix in 2025, ahead of both McLaren drivers.

Red Bull trailed McLaren for performance into 2025, with Verstappen finishing second at the season-opening Australian Grand Prix after battling Lando Norris and Oscar Piastri for the lead in wet conditions. He claimed third in the sprint and fourth in the main race in China amidst tyre wear and performance struggles with the RB21, whilst new teammate Liam Lawson finished outside the points; Verstappen claimed Red Bull had also dropped behind Ferrari and Mercedes, as Lawson was replaced by Yuki Tsunoda. He received widespread acclaim for his surprise pole position at the Japanese Grand Prix, before holding off both McLaren drivers to claim his first victory of the year; Andrew Benson of BBC Sport described it as "a weekend of the sort of rare perfection that comes only from drivers of the very highest quality". He finished sixth in Bahrain amidst further performance and pit stop struggles, prompting Red Bull to hold crisis talks over his future. He returned to pole in Saudi Arabia, where he finished second after receiving a penalty for a first-corner incident with Piastri. Verstappen finished fourth in the Miami sprint, demoted to seventeenth following a penalty for an unsafe pit release; he took pole for the main race, ultimately finishing fourth.

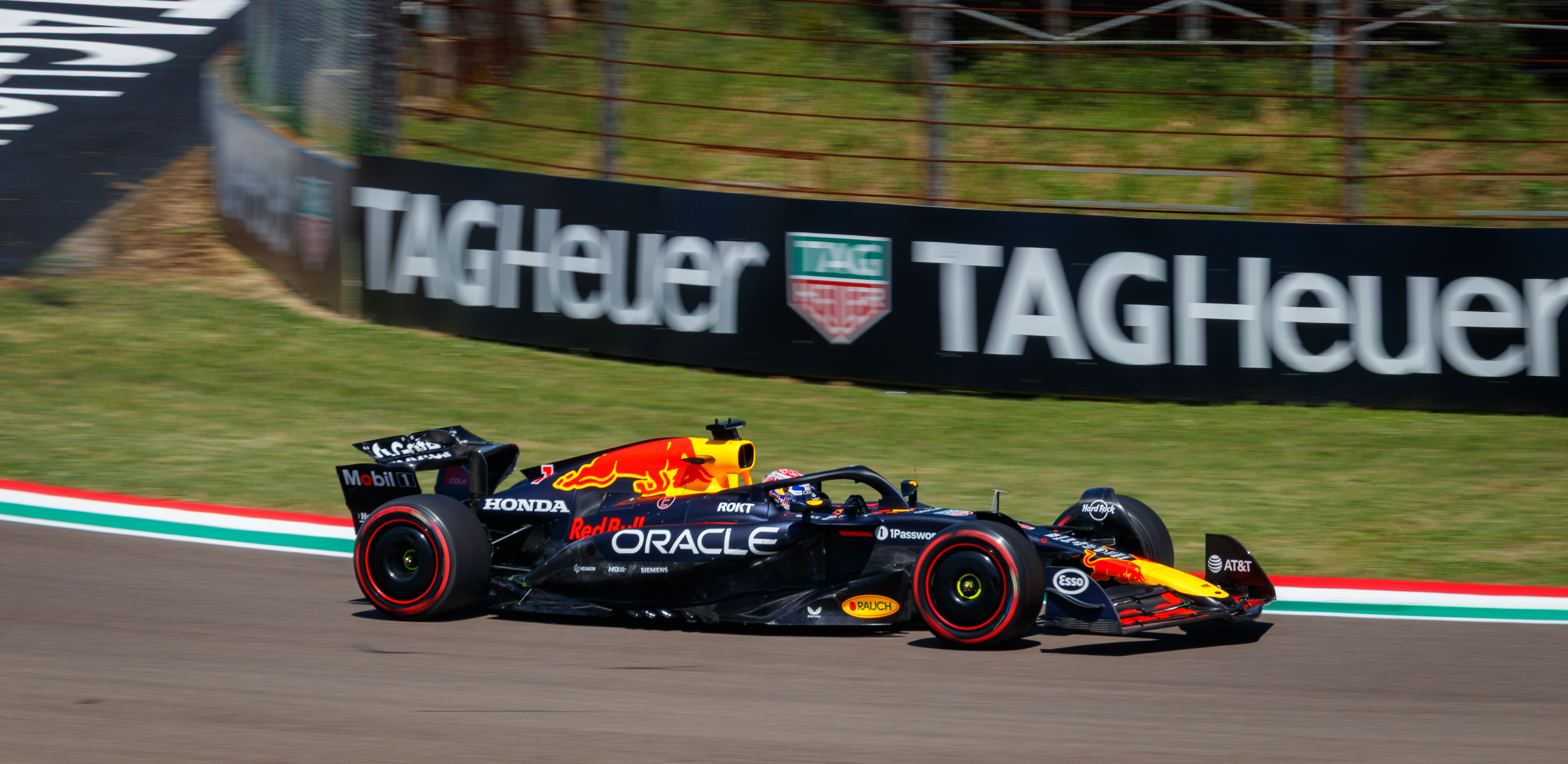
Verstappen won the Emilia Romagna Grand Prix after a lauded first-lap overtake on championship-leader Oscar Piastri.

Verstappen won the Emilia Romagna Grand Prix after a first-lap overtake on Piastri into Variante Tamburello, which was widely hailed as one of his greatest. His fourth-place in Monaco was followed by tenth in Spain, where he was penalised for an intentional collision with George Russell as he fell out of contention for the victory; the pair finished 1–2 in Canada, with Verstappen second. After qualifying seventh for the Austrian Grand Prix, Verstappen retired after being hit by Kimi Antonelli on the first lap; 61 points behind championship leader Piastri, Verstappen admitted his fifth title challenge was "case closed". He took another pole at the British Grand Prix on a low-downforce setup, before ceding the lead to Piastri and spinning during a safety car restart in wet-weather conditions; he recovered to fifth and criticised his lack of grip. He won the Belgium sprint after a first-lap overtake on Piastri and claimed fourth in the Grand Prix. He dropped to ninth in Hungary before finishing second to Piastri at the Dutch Grand Prix, dropping him 104 points behind the Australian McLaren driver who led the points standings after that race and 70 points behind Norris who retired from the race with power issues.

Verstappen's pole lap in Italy was the fastest in Formula One history, where he overcame early opposition from Norris to win the Grand Prix by over 19 seconds in record speed. He claimed a grand chelem with his 14-second victory at the Azerbaijan Grand Prix, before finishing second to Russell in Singapore. His back-to-back victories in the United States sprint and Grand Prix reduced his deficit to 40 points, and he recovered from fifth to third in Mexico City with a one-stop strategy. Finishing fourth from sixth at the São Paulo sprint, Verstappen qualified sixteenth for the Grand Prix, his lowest qualifying position – excluding any penalties – since the 2021 Russian Grand Prix, which he chose not to run any qualifying laps for due to impending engine and grid penalties. Red Bull started him from the pit lane after changing his engine in parc fermé; surviving an early puncture, he climbed up to third in the race to draw ever closer to the championship lead. Verstappen won at Las Vegas with both McLarens being disqualified post-race, moving him level on points with Piastri and 24 behind championship leader Norris. Verstappen finished fourth in the Qatar sprint before improving to collect a win in the Grand Prix, bringing him twelve points behind Norris and overtaking Piastri for second in the championship. Converting pole position in Abu Dhabi to a win, he achieved the most Grand Prix wins throughout the season with eight overall, with both McLaren drivers winning seven apiece. He ultimately placed merely two points behind Norris, who secured the Drivers' Championship.

==== 2026: New regulations ====
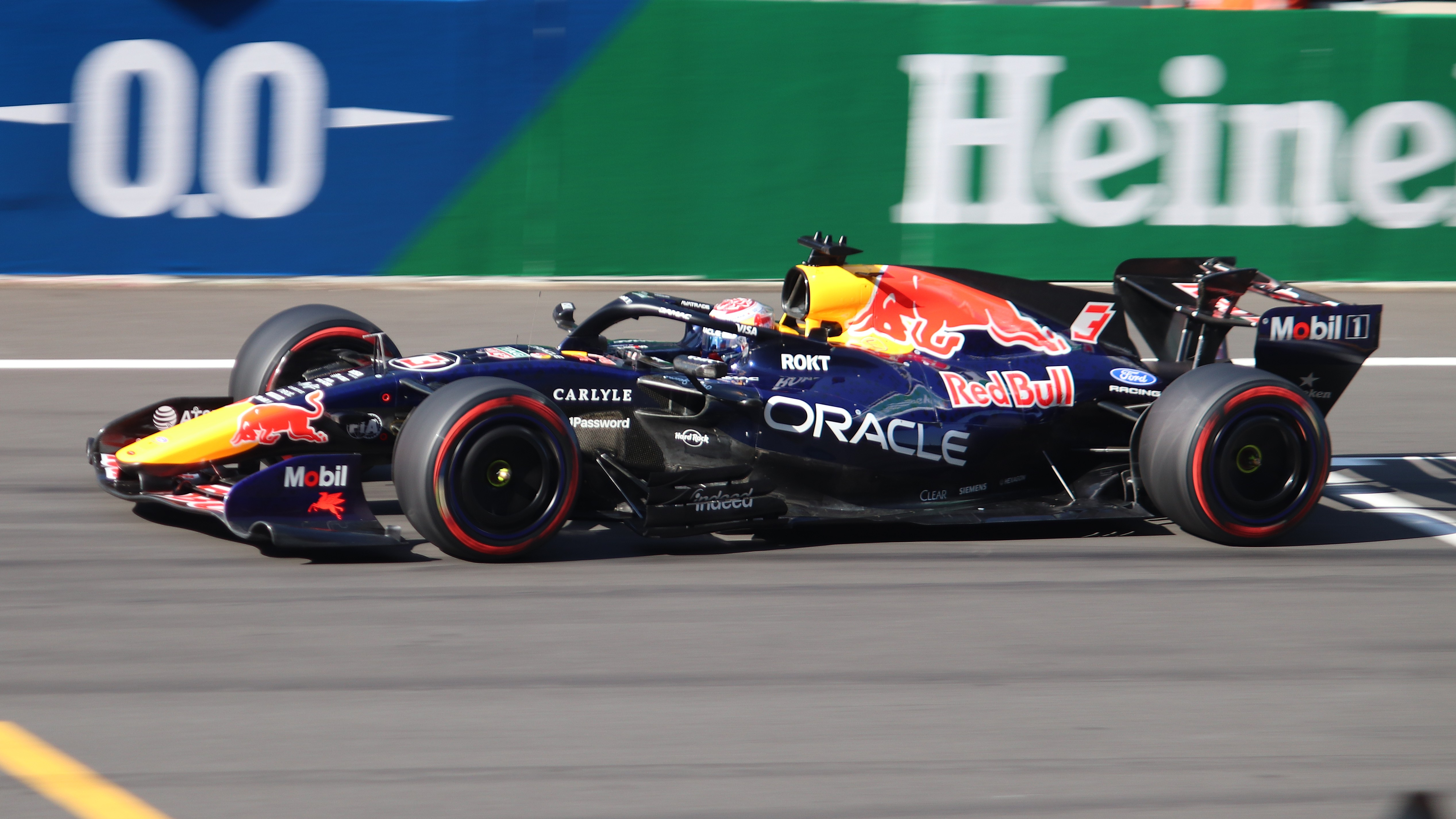
Verstappen qualifying for the 2026 Chinese Grand Prix

Verstappen was partnered with Isack Hadjar for the 2026 season. Ahead of the season, Verstappen announced he would run the number 3 on his car as the FIA granted drivers permission to change their number ahead of 2026, instead of reverting to his old number 33.

Verstappen started the season with a crash in qualifying at the Australian Grand Prix, where he recovered to sixth after battling defending champion Lando Norris. At the Chinese Grand Prix, Verstappen qualified in eighth for both the sprint and Grand Prix, and recorded no points in both races, suffering an engine-related retirement during the Grand Prix. Ahead of the Japanese Grand Prix, Verstappen refused to answer media questions until The Guardian journalist Giles Richards was removed, following Richards's pointed questioning in Abu Dhabi regarding the 2025 Spanish Grand Prix. Following an eighth-place finish in Japan, Verstappen told BBC Sport that he was considering retirement following the 2026 season. At the Miami Grand Prix, Verstappen finished fifth in both the sprint and the main race. He placed seventh in the Canadian Grand Prix sprint, before qualifying sixth and finishing third in the main race. Qualifying on the front row in Monaco, he retired on the opening lap following power unit struggles that dropped him to last off the line. Verstappen finished fourth at Barcelona-Catalunya, before returning to the podium at the Austrian Grand Prix. At Silverstone, he placed sixth in the sprint race and qualified seventh for the main race. He crashed on the forty-eighth lap of the main race, leading to a safety car finish for the race. Verstappen returned to the podium again at the Belgian Grand Prix, where he qualified second and finished third.

In August 2026, Verstappen signed a contract extension with Red Bull Racing until the 2030 season. At the Dutch Grand Prix, he finished sixth in the sprint race, but did not finish the main race after crashing on the opening lap.

At the Azerbaijan Grand Prix, Verstappen qualified eighth but quickly charged through the field, finishing second by just 0.196 seconds to George Russell, leading the Red Bull team's first double podium since the 2024 Chinese Grand Prix alongside teammate Isack Hadjar.

Verstappen won the 2026 Bahrain Grand Prix held at the Sepang International Circuit in Kuala Lumpur, Malaysia, after the event was relocated from Bahrain. After taking his first pole position of the season, he finished ahead of Kimi Antonelli and Lewis Hamilton. The victory was Verstappen's first win of the season. He continued his good form by claiming pole position for the sprint race at the 2026 Singapore Grand Prix. Verstappen subsequently won the sprint race in Singapore, before then claiming pole position for the Grand Prix, which he converted to his first win at the circuit and 73rd race win overall. Verstappen qualified second at the 2026 United States Grand Prix, and managed to lead the race from the 25th to the 31st lap, before eventually finishing in third behind race winner Antonelli and runner-up Charles Leclerc, meaning that he alongside the latter can no longer mathematically challenge for the title with only five races remaining. This marked the first time he was knocked out of contention since the 2020 season. Verstappen then went on to claim his third win of the season at the 2026 Mexico City Grand Prix, the same event in which Kimi Antonelli secured the World Championship title. Verstappen claimed his fourth victory of the season and 75th career Grand Prix win at the 2026 Las Vegas Grand Prix, finishing ahead of Lando Norris and Oscar Piastri.

== Driver profile ==
=== Qualifying pace and consistency ===
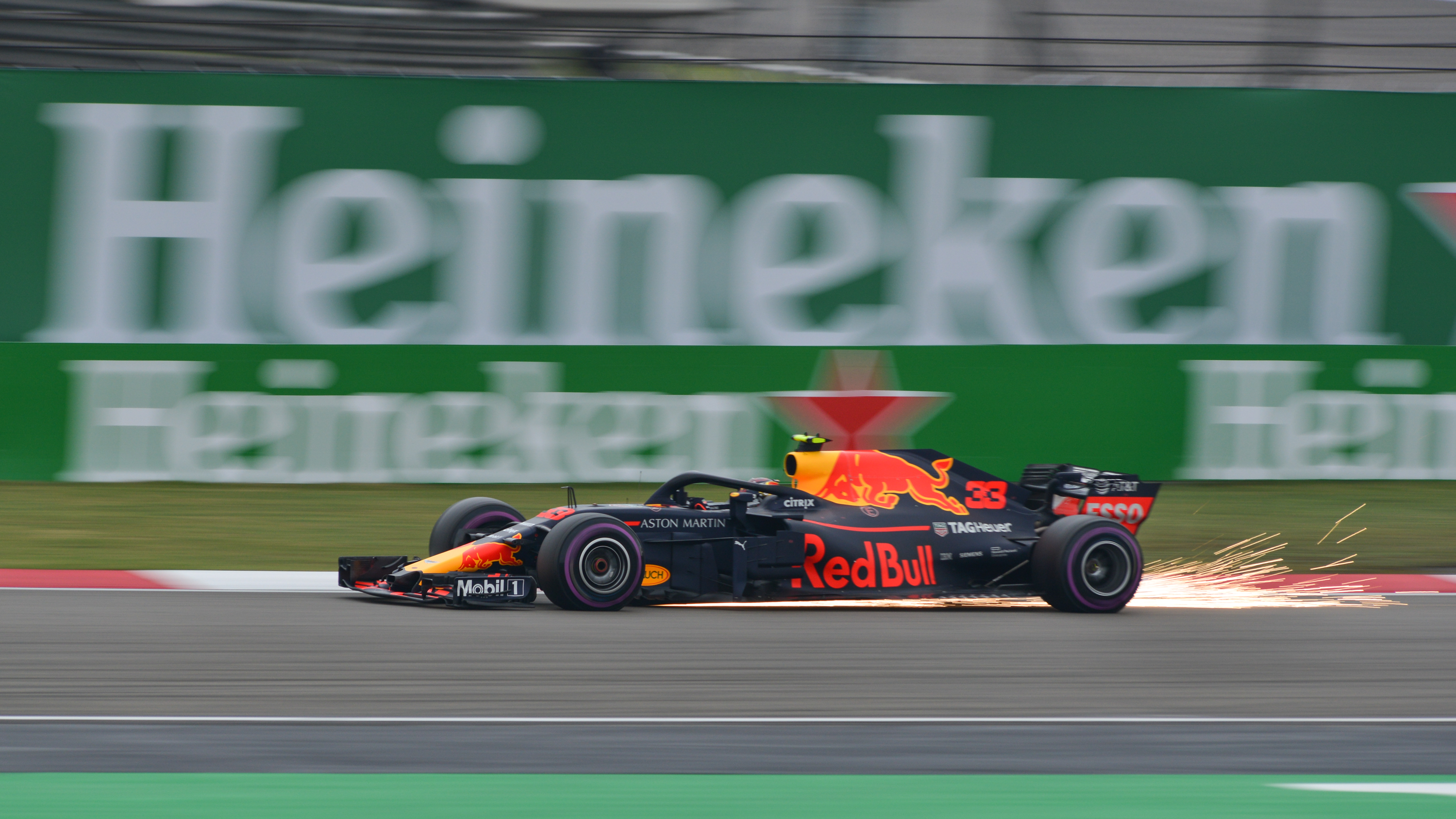
Verstappen on a qualifying lap at the 2018 Chinese Grand Prix

Following Verstappen's maiden pole position at the 2019 Hungarian Grand Prix, former Formula One World Champion Nico Rosberg described him as the fastest driver in Formula One. Rosberg elucidated that Verstappen did not have the fastest car during the qualifying session in Hungary, emphasising that it was Verstappen's raw speed that allowed him to secure pole position: "Mercedes still had the fastest car, and it's just Verstappen with his driving that put it up there in pole."

In 2019, former Formula One World Champion Jenson Button stated that he believes Verstappen is the fastest Formula One driver ever: "I think he is the fastest driver that has ever driven an F1 car. I really do, I think he is unbelievably fast." Journalist Scott Mitchell from The Race commented: "When everything comes together, Verstappen is the quickest driver in F1 over one lap, but the odd mistake and scruffy session must be eliminated." Helmut Marko, the advisor to the Red Bull GmbH Formula One teams, stated that Verstappen is the fastest driver Red Bull have ever had.

In 2021, three-time Formula One World Champion Jackie Stewart claimed that Verstappen is the fastest driver in Formula One, but he also added that Verstappen is still in the "puppy stage" of his career. Peter Windsor, an experienced Formula One journalist, expressed Verstappen's ability to change direction "quicker than anybody else" through the high-speed section Maggots and Becketts: Silverstone's fastest sequence of corners. Windsor stressed that Verstappen's lightning-quick change of direction is a result of the innate feel he has for creating the "perfect platform" to achieve what he wants with the car during a lap. He is intrinsically able to create, for "a trillionth of a second", a minuscule "flat area" between the left and the right of a change of direction ahead of him, in order to attain a stable balance with the car before applying the next steering and throttle input. Scuderia AlphaTauri's team principal, Franz Tost, declared Verstappen to be the fastest driver in Formula One; following the Dutchman's "really deserved" maiden title triumph in 2021. After winning the 2024 World Drivers' Championship in the third-placed RB20, James Elson of Motor Sport stated "if there was any doubt beforehand, 2024 proved that Max Verstappen is F1's best driver", adding that "not only the fastest, capable of creating one-lap magic, he knows how to produce all it takes to win in the race too". Verstappen received widespread acclaim for his surprise pole lap at the 2025 Japanese Grand Prix, with Andrew Benson of BBC Sport commenting that "many F1 observers regarded [Verstappen's qualifying lap] as one of the greatest of all time".

=== Dominance over teammates ===
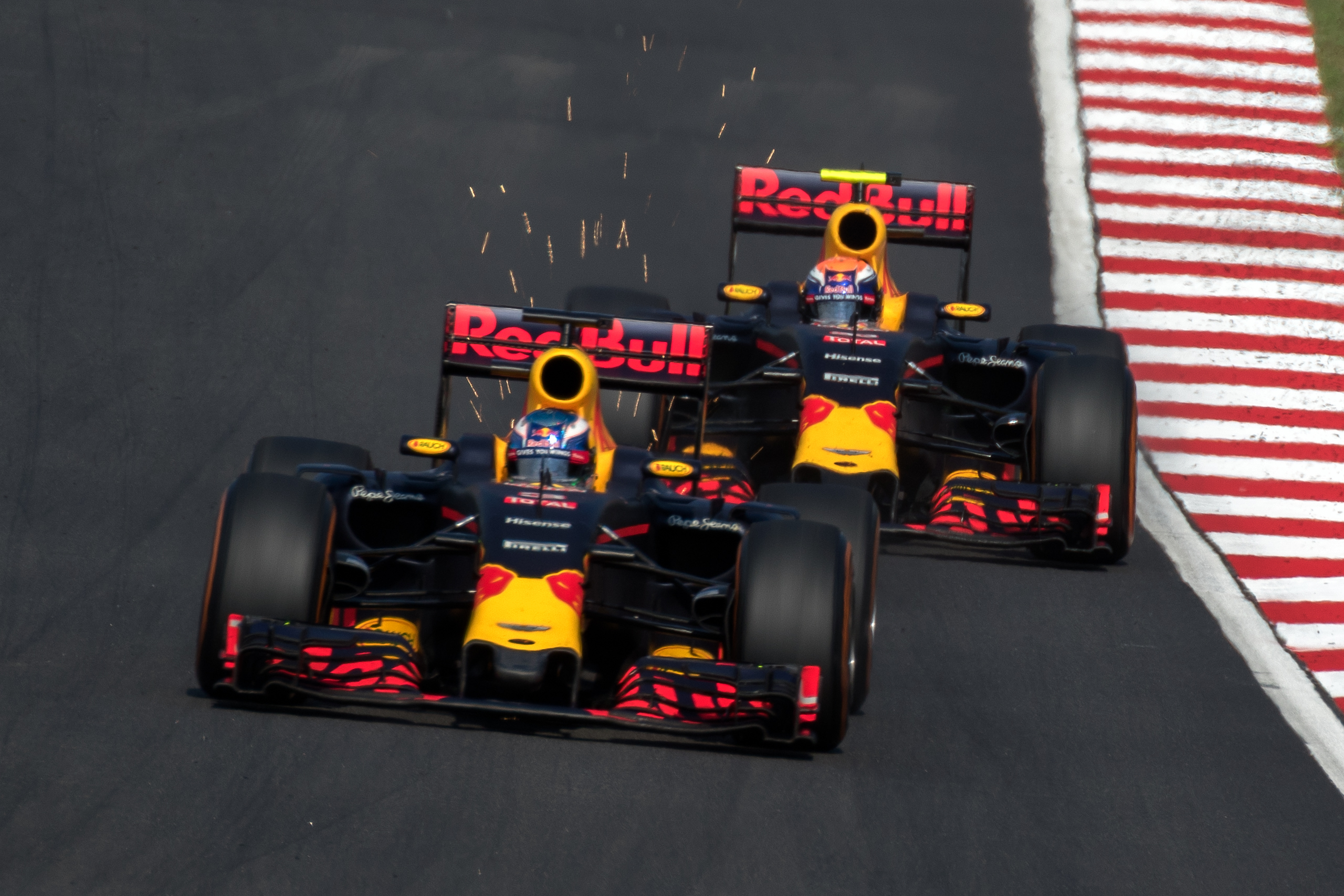
Verstappen (right) was teammates with Daniel Ricciardo (left) from 2016 to 2018, pictured at the 2016 Malaysian Grand Prix.

Former Formula One driver Eddie Irvine praised Verstappen, stating that he is "by far the most dominant team leader on the grid." Irvine highlighted that Verstappen "has had many different second drivers in the team and none of them have got close to him." During the 2020 season, Jenson Button stated that he does not "think there's been a driver that's annihilated their teammates like he [Verstappen] has in a very long time." Motorsport columnist and former Formula One driver Jolyon Palmer, commented that Verstappen's maiden World Championship triumph could usher in a "new era of dominance" in the sport. Palmer wrote:

[Verstappen's] qualifying pace is frightening and has been the basis for this title-charging campaign. He's had the most pole positions of anyone with 10 – almost half of the races, and it would have been half had he completed his mesmeric Jeddah lap, which ended up being possibly Max's biggest error in a near-perfect season. For a driver who has demolished three successive team mates in three years and made only a handful of small mistakes in that time, you question what scope their [sic] even is for improvement – but if he can take his game onto another level from here, we could be about to see the start of a new era of dominance.

Journalist Scott Mitchell expounded the reason why the Dutchman's teammates have fallen short "even with the data". Mitchell wrote: "Verstappen drives mainly on intuition, and that comes from years of training and preparation. He has a database in his head which he can use immediately. Even with data, Gasly and Albon could see where he was faster, but they could never grasp how he was faster there. That's because what makes Verstappen so good is mainly unconscious." According to Mitchell, those years of training and driving on his intuition has made it impossible for other drivers to measure up to Verstappen.

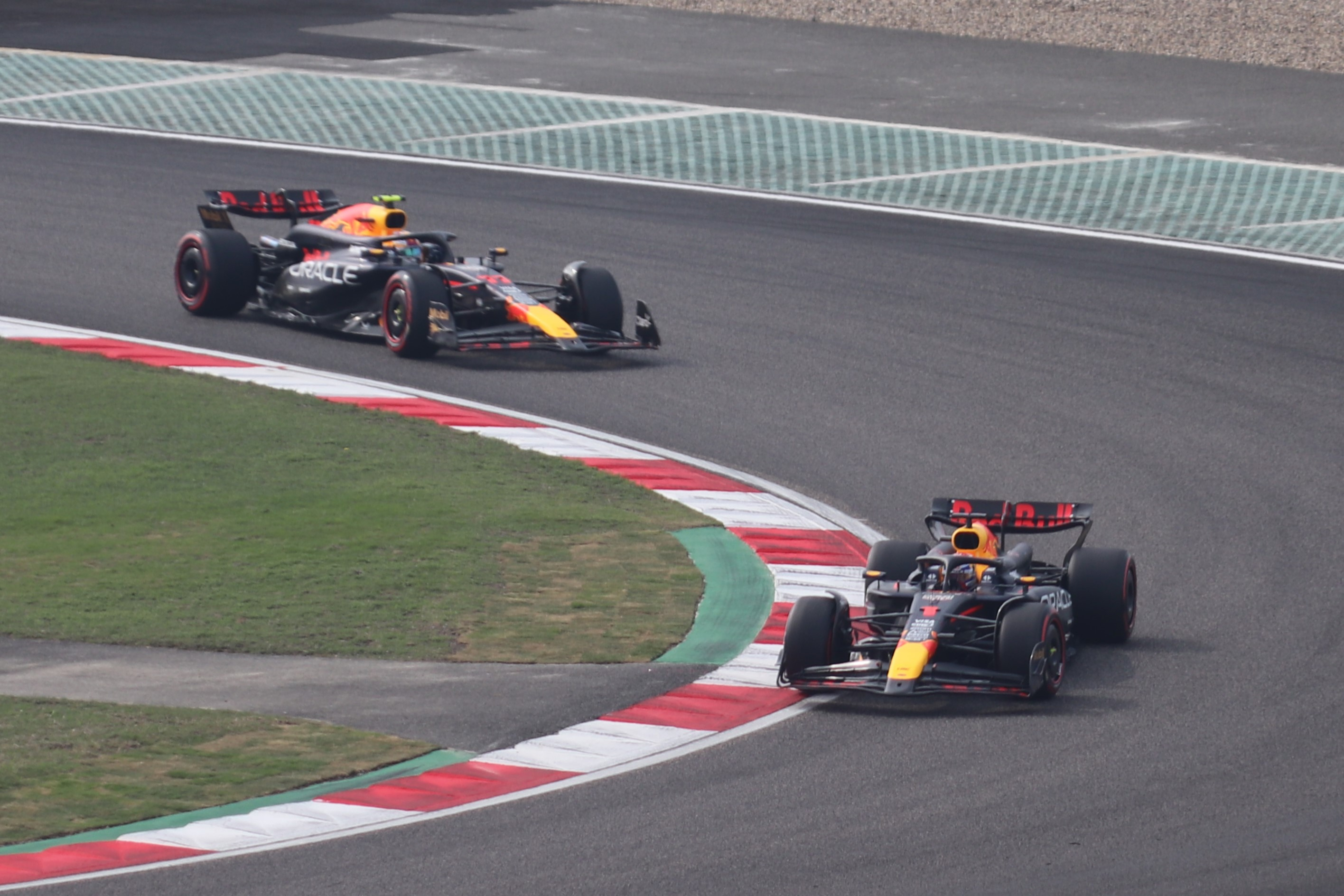
Verstappen (right) was teammates with Sergio Pérez (left) from 2021 to 2024, pictured at the 2024 Chinese Grand Prix.

Helmut Marko asserted that Verstappen's progress has moved him clear of his former Formula 1 team-mate Daniel Ricciardo, in both qualifying and race trim. "There is specific data," Marko told Autosport, "In qualifying the gap to Ricciardo is greater. The strange thing is Max sometimes slides more, but still manages to keep the tyres alive." Verstappen previously mentioned that he was three or four-tenths faster on average than "very fast qualifier" Daniel Ricciardo. Marko concluded that then 20-year-old Verstappen "clearly moved away" from Ricciardo since the "second half of the 2018 season."

=== Natural talent ===
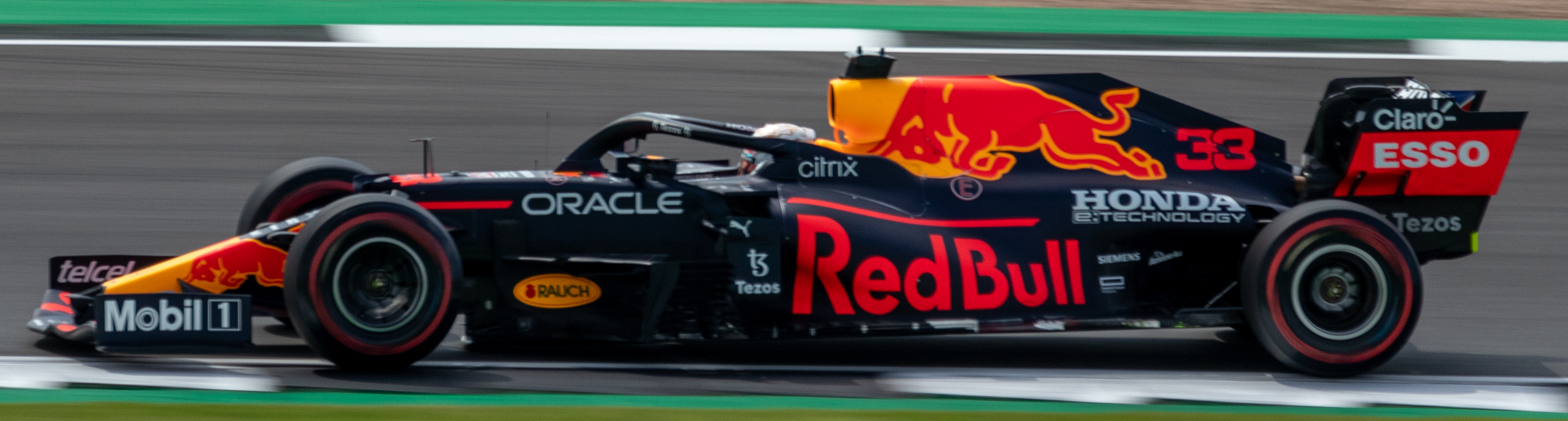
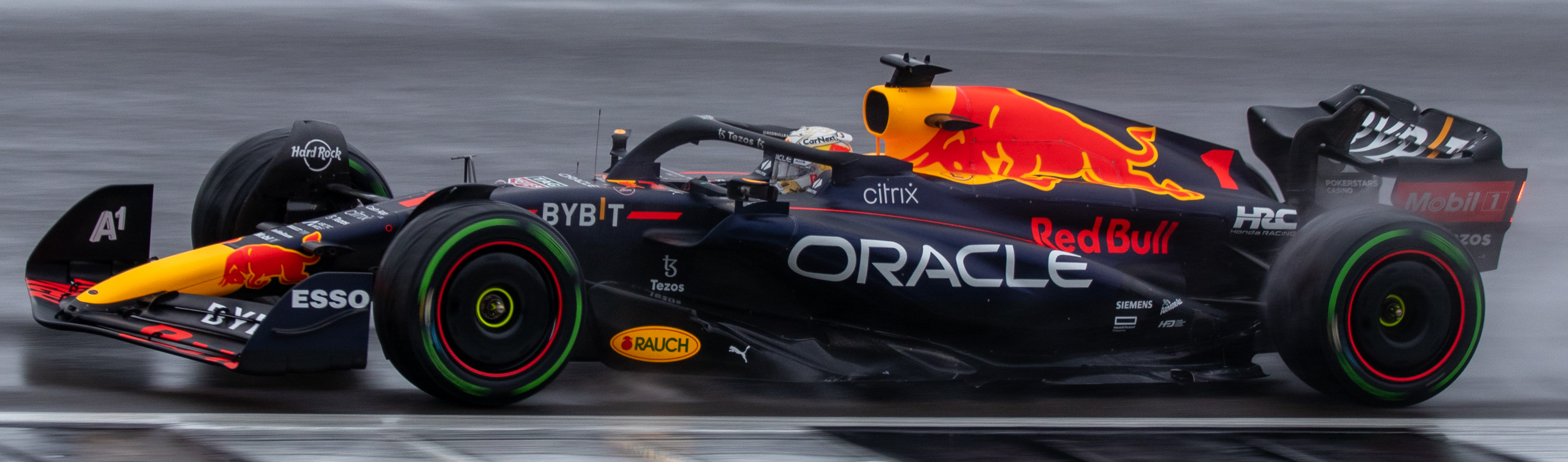
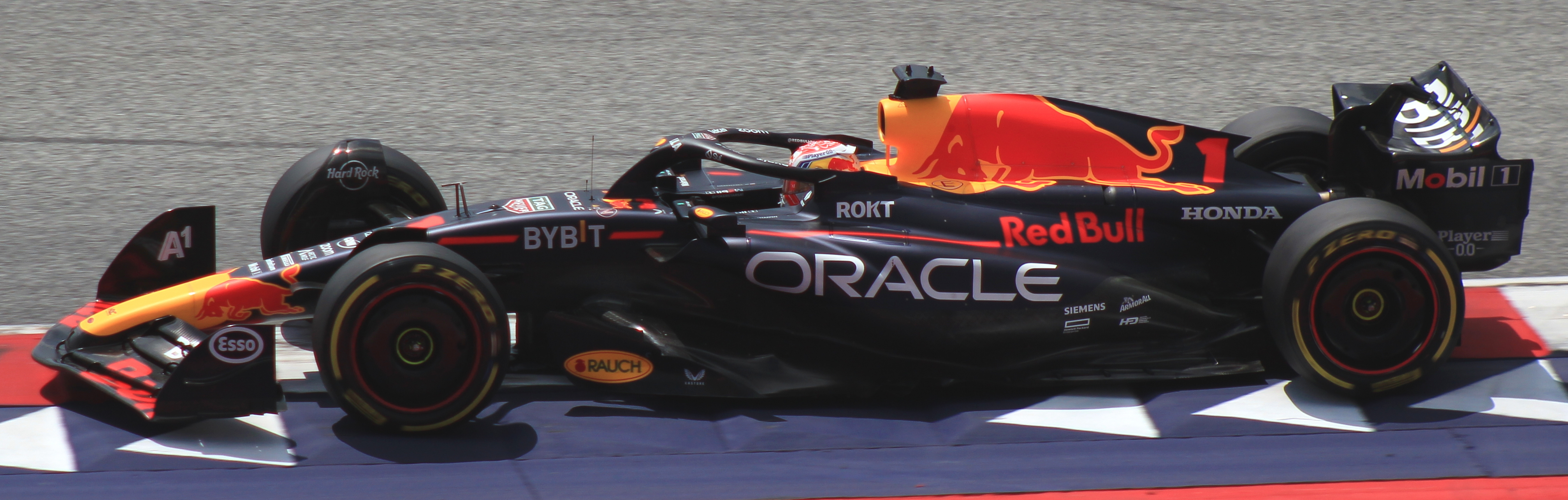
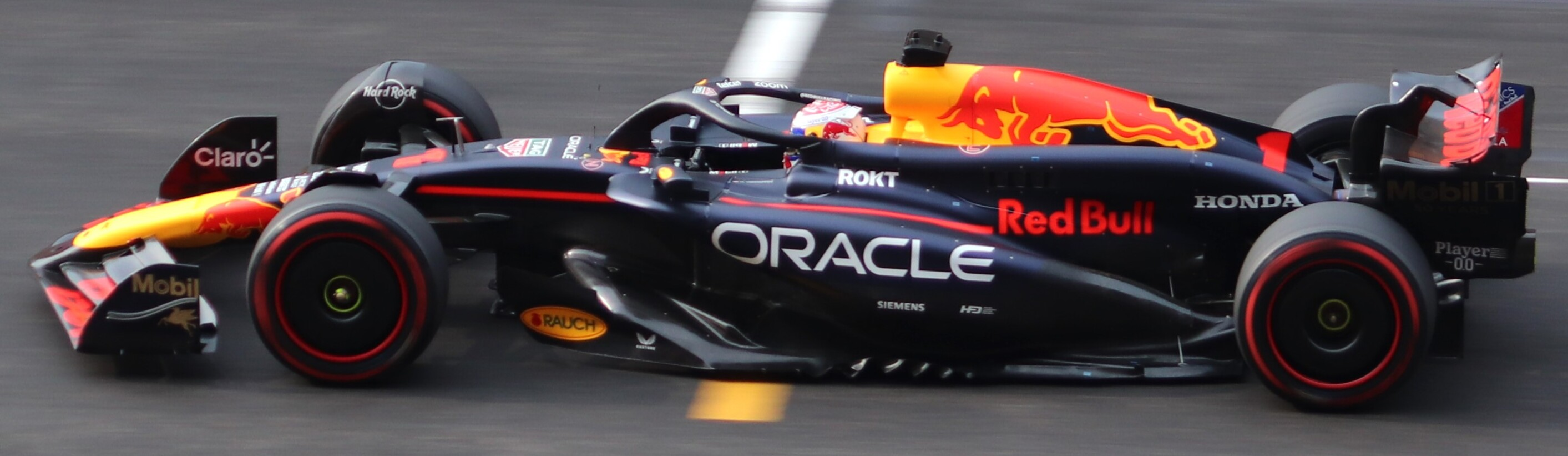
Verstappen's four championship-winning cars from top-to-bottom: RB16B (2021), RB18 (2022), RB19 (2023) and RB20 (2024)

Following his maiden Formula One win, at the 2016 Spanish Grand Prix, three-time World Drivers' Champion Niki Lauda described Verstappen as the "talent of the century". Red Bull team principal Christian Horner stated that Verstappen is the best driver Red Bull have ever seen: "I have no doubt [Verstappen is] the best we have seen on one of our cars, in terms of outright raw ability and commitment. He's the best driver we've seen."

Gerhard Berger echoed 2009 World Drivers' Champion Jenson Button's comments, anointing Max Verstappen as the Formula One driver of this era with the most raw talent. Speaking to Sport1, Berger ventured: "When it comes to raw talent, Max Verstappen is the most talented of all. But it's not just about raw talent, it's about the whole package. That means it's not just about setting the fastest laps but also to win a race. And not just [about] one race but many and eventually a championship, and championships."

Two-time World Drivers' Champion Fernando Alonso commented that Verstappen is the standout driver in Formula One, declaring him to be "one step ahead" of everyone. Alonso noted that Verstappen deserved to win the 2021 Formula One World Championship, ahead of the title decider that saw Verstappen and Lewis Hamilton enter level on points: "Mercedes lately have been more performing and they've won a couple of races now, but Max is driving—in my opinion—one step ahead of all of us. We saw the [qualifying] lap in Jeddah, until he touched the wall at the last corner, that lap was coming from Max, not the Red Bull." Karun Chandhok likened Verstappen's ruthless and uncompromising attitude in race combat to seven-time World Drivers' Champion Michael Schumacher. By 2025, Andrew Benson of BBC Sport opined that Verstappen was "regarded by almost everyone in [Formula One] as the best driver in the world".

=== Rivalries ===
==== Lewis Hamilton ====
Verstappen (left) and Hamilton (right) at the 2022 French Grand Prix

Verstappen's most well-known rival is his 2021 title rival, Lewis Hamilton. The title battle between Verstappen and Hamilton in 2021 has been compared to other legendary battles like the Prost–Senna rivalry. The two swapped leads five times, finished 1–2 in fourteen out of 22 races, and numerous incidents on-track involving the two (Note: Including the British Grand Prix, where Hamilton made contact with Verstappen, which resulted in a high-speed crash; Red Bull chief technology officer Adrian Newey stated that "I think Max's [crash] at Silverstone was the last one where we thought, 'Is he okay? Is he badly hurt in there?'"; Verstappen later revealed that he raced with severe blurred vision after the crash. He described seeing "wavy" or "blurry" images, particularly on bumpy circuits like COTA at the 2021 United States Grand Prix, where he almost stopped. The other notable incident occurred at the Italian Grand Prix, where Verstappen's car was stacked on top of Hamilton's after a kerb sent him upward.) culminated in a title decider at the season finale, the Abu Dhabi Grand Prix, where Verstappen, benefitting from newer tyres that were fitted during a safety car period, passed Hamilton on the final lap for the lead, and ultimately the championship.

==== Charles Leclerc ====
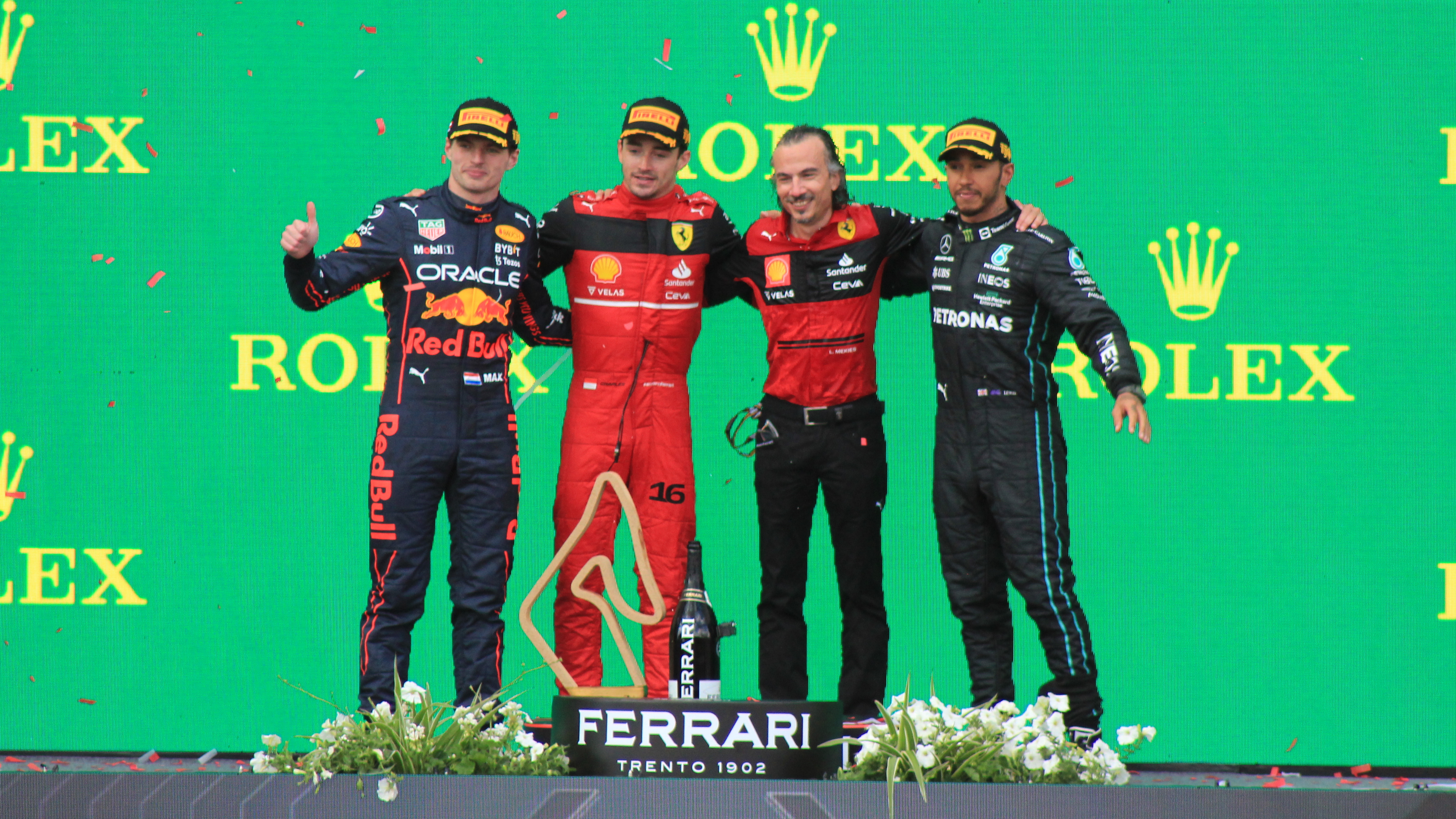
Verstappen (left), Leclerc (middle) and Hamilton (right) on the podium at the 2022 Austrian Grand Prix

Charles Leclerc has also been cited as one of Verstappen's rivals. Following a junior karting incident in 2012 where Leclerc brushed off a collision with Verstappen as "just an incident", a rivalry began between the two which has since been matured into mutual respect. Verstappen's battles with Leclerc are characterised as cleaner and more respectful, focusing on "pure racing". Verstappen has noted he treats Leclerc differently than other rivals, simply because he has known him and trusted his racing ability. Verstappen and Leclerc battled for the championship at the beginning of 2022 before Ferrari's performance declined, allowing Red Bull and Verstappen to eventually secure both championships.

=== Racecraft ===
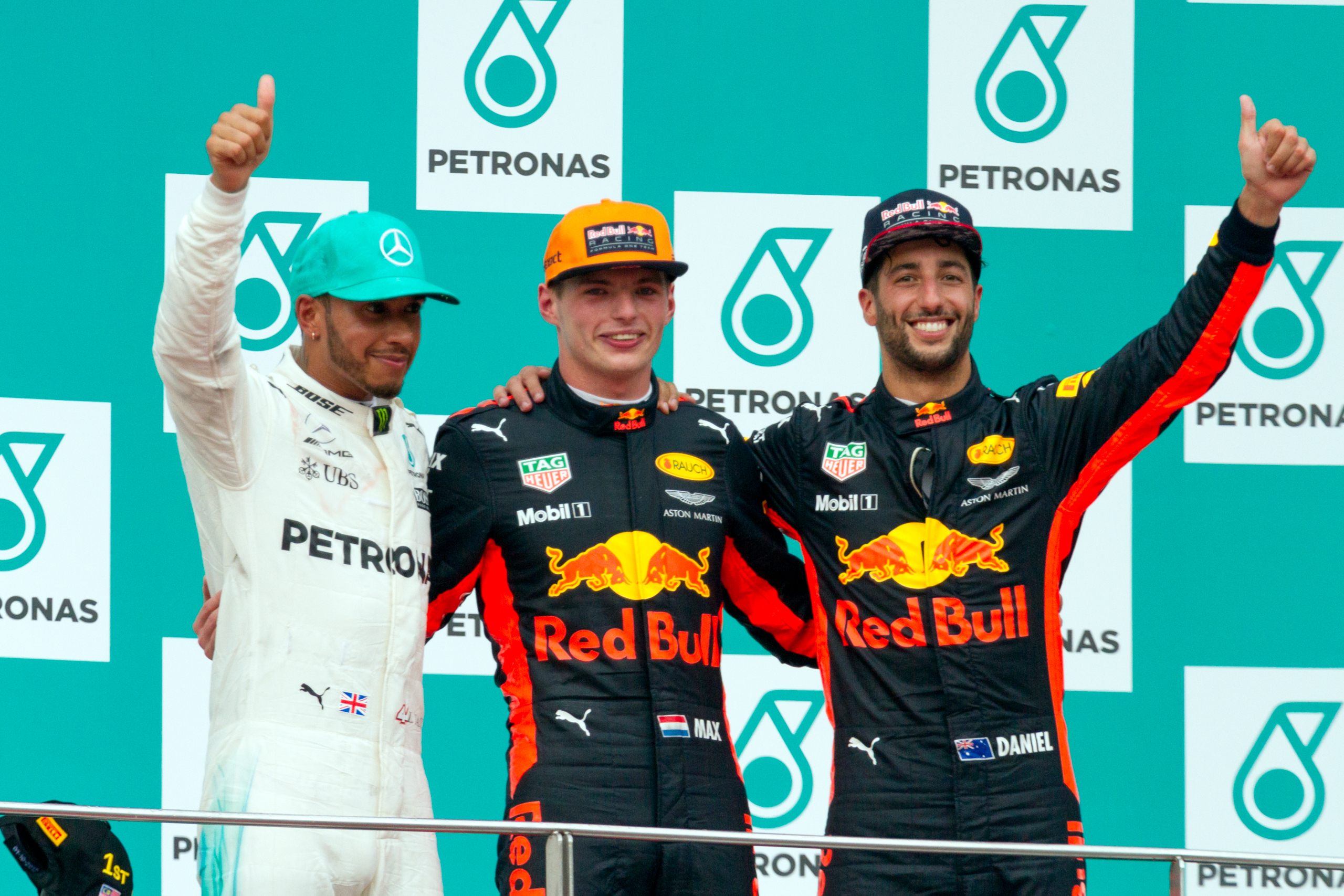
Verstappen (middle) on the podium with Lewis Hamilton (left) and Daniel Ricciardo (right) after winning the 2017 Malaysian Grand Prix

Following Verstappen being given a warning for his driving conduct at the 2016 Belgian Grand Prix, the 18-year-old received the backing of then three-time champion Lewis Hamilton, who commented: "firstly, give the guy a break, he is 18 years old. What the frickin' heck were any of us doing at 18?"

Despite earning high praise and acclaim from Formula One drivers and experts in and out of the sport, Verstappen faced criticism in the wake of the penalties he incurred during the 2021 Saudi Arabian Grand Prix. Following this race, former Formula One driver Martin Brundle wrote: "Such is [his] car control and cunning, he's sometimes able to pull off the audacious moves and leave a margin of doubt as to whether it's hard racing or simply a professional foul outside of the regulations and it's those moments which are generating the confusion, controversies and inconsistencies. Ayrton Senna and Michael Schumacher had their faults too, and I was on the receiving end from both of them on occasions, but it's a sizeable dent on their immense reputations, not a positive." Following an impressive first half of the 2022 season, journalist David Tremayne claimed Verstappen had elevated himself to a new higher level compared to his 2021 title winning season, suggesting Verstappen's first title had made him more relaxed and "chirpy".

Following the 2024 Mexico City Grand Prix, Verstappen received widespread condemnation from fans and media for incidents involving title rival Lando Norris, for which he received 20 seconds worth of time penalties. Many commentators and former drivers likened his tactics and 'win-at-all-costs' attitude to those of Senna and Schumacher, whilst 1996 World Drivers' Champion Damon Hill characterised them as reminiscent of Wacky Races antagonist Dick Dastardly. Before the following race in São Paulo, Verstappen criticised the alleged British bias in the media, stating "I have the wrong passport". Upon his victory from 17th on the grid in the rain-affected race, he stated in the post-race press conference "I appreciate all of you being here, but I don't see any British press. Do they have to run to the airport, or [do they not] know where the press conference is?"

=== Fan support ===
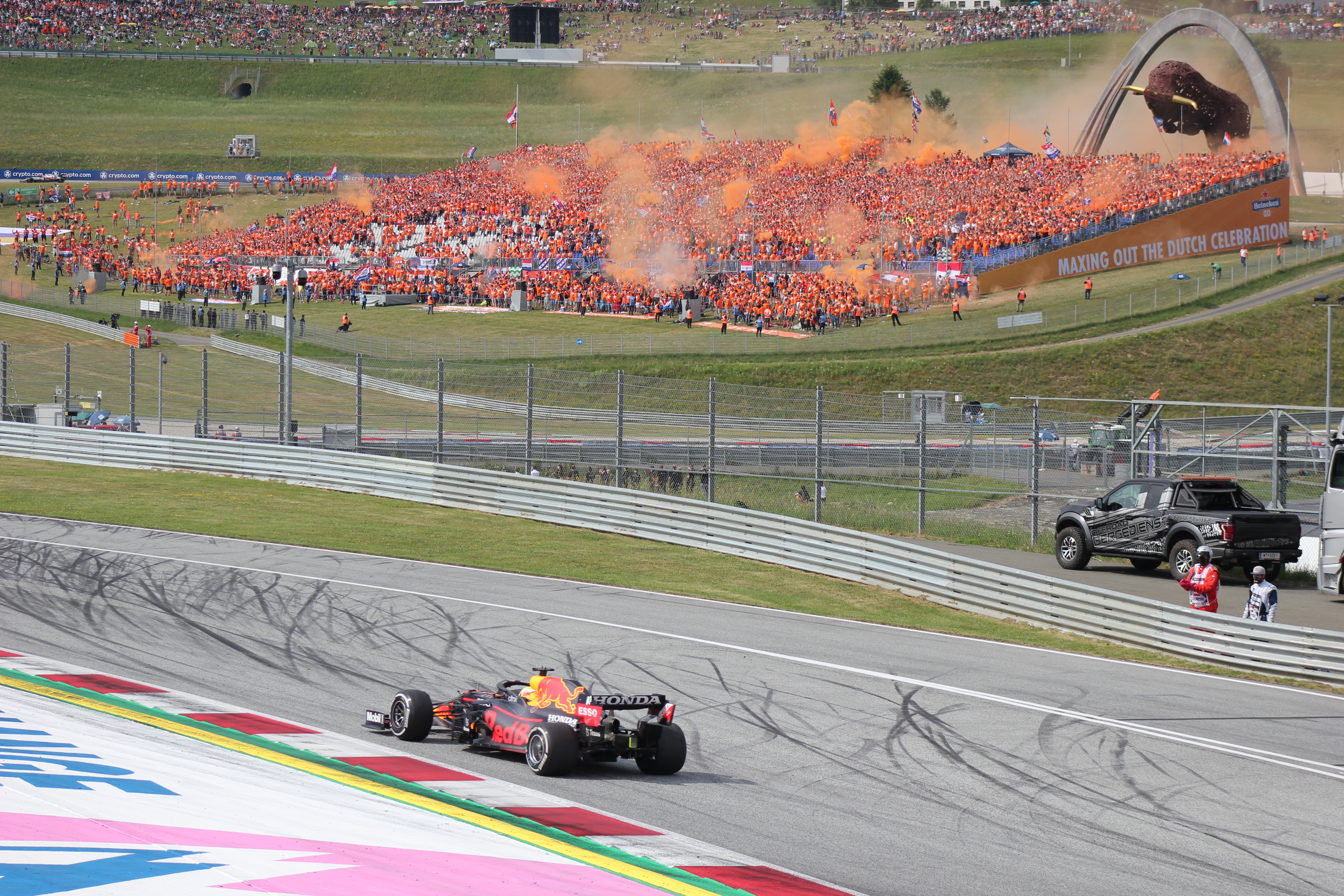
The Verstappen grandstand at the 2021 Austrian Grand Prix

Verstappen has accumulated a significant fanbase from around the world, particularly from his home country of the Netherlands. The frequent association of Verstappen with the colour orange—the national colour of the Netherlands—has led to his fanbase being referred to as the Orange Army. Several races across Europe have dedicated Verstappen grandstands to accommodate thousands of travelling Dutch fans, boosting ticket sales at Grands Prix such as in Belgium, Austria and Hungary. A Verstappen grandstand featured at the inaugural Las Vegas Grand Prix in 2023.

During the 2021 Dutch Grand Prix, the managing director of Honda in Formula One, Masashi Yamamoto, praised Verstappen's support, stating that "in the six years I've been involved with Honda F1, I've never seen such a great turnout as at the Dutch Grand Prix. It was like being in a football stadium." In October 2021, Verstappen was voted the most popular Formula One driver in an official worldwide survey conducted by Nielsen Media Research and Motorsport Network, earning 14.4% of the vote with particular success in the United States and Japan.

The fan-made song "Super Max!", performed by the Pitstop Boys in 2016, went viral after his victory at the 2021 Abu Dhabi Grand Prix, topping the Spotify Viral 50 chart in the Netherlands and reaching number two in the United Kingdom. Another fan-made EDM track "33 Max Verstappen", was released in 2023, eventually going viral on social media due to internet memes referencing the hook: "tu tu tu du, Max Verstappen" (sometimes also written as "du du du du, Max Verstappen").

== Other racing ==
=== Sportscar racing ===
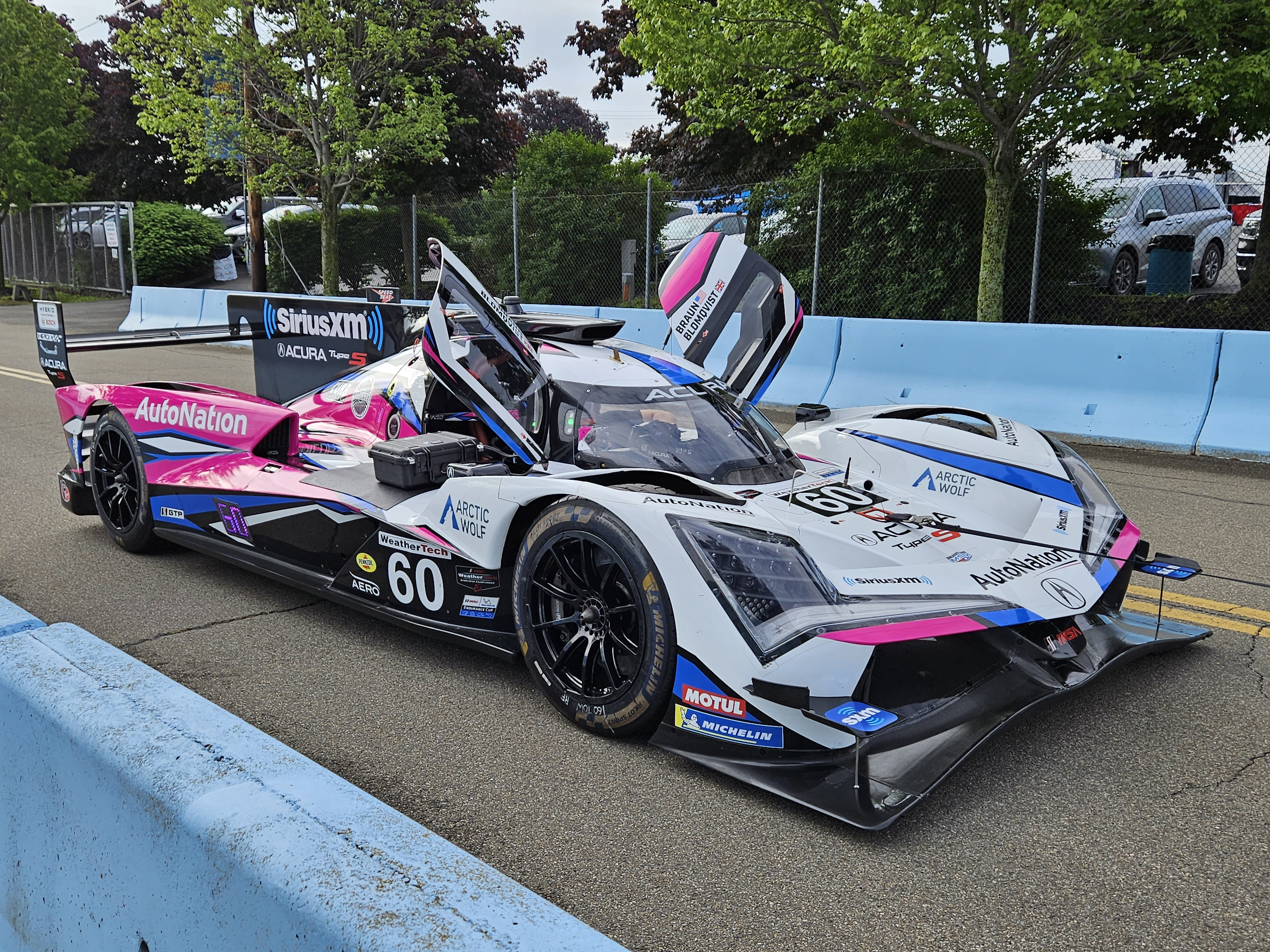
The Acura ARX-06 (pictured in 2023) tested by Verstappen with Honda Racing Corporation in November 2024.

Verstappen tested the Honda NSX-GT—a GT500 class Super GT car—during the 2022 Honda Racing Thanks Day event at Motegi. After winning the event's kart race alongside Marc Márquez, Honda awarded Verstappen—the first Honda-powered World Drivers' Champion since 1991—with an NSX Type S. He later tested a Red Bull–liveried Nissan Z NISMO GT500 at Fuji prior to the 2026 Japanese Grand Prix.

In January 2024, Verstappen drove the Ferrari 296 GT3 at the Portimão, as part of a two-day test with Deutsche Tourenwagen Masters team Emil Frey Racing alongside Thierry Vermeulen, who competed under the Verstappen.com Racing banner in 2023. Team principal Lorenz Frey-Hilti stated "there were also other GT3 cars that day, but I can only say that Verstappen was driving on a different level than the rest. There are good drivers who cannot shine in a GT3 car due to a lack of experience, but Max is different. If something has four wheels, then [he's fast in it]", adding that he was "world-class".

On 19 November 2024, Verstappen drove a prototype for the first time, testing the Acura ARX-06 with Honda Racing Corporation at Las Vegas Motor Speedway, ahead of the Las Vegas Grand Prix. Verstappen expressed his desire to compete in the 24 Hours of Daytona and Le Mans after the test, stating that "it's just about finding the time".

In May 2025, he entered testing for the third round of the 2025 Nürburgring Langstrecken-Serie in the 296 under the pseudonym "Franz Hermann", where he claimed to set an unofficial GT3 lap record, reportedly in an attempt to obtain a licence to compete on the Nordschleife. He received an FIA Platinum licence later that month, allowing him to compete in top-level endurance racing.

In September 2025, he made his competitive debut on the Nordschleife in the seventh round for Lionspeed GP, completing the laps required for a GT3 permit in a horsepower-restricted Porsche 718 Cayman GT4 CS as he finished seventh in-class. Later the same month, Verstappen made his GT3 race debut and won. He drove for Emil Frey Racing, racing a Ferrari 296 GT3 with Chris Lulham in the Nürburgring Endurance Series. This start also made Max Verstappen the first defending Formula One World Champion to simultaneously compete in Formula One and another racing series since Keke Rosberg, who made a one-off appearance in the 1983 World Sportscar Championship, also at the Nürburgring Nordschleife. After qualifying third, Verstappen, who drove the first stint, passed two cars and began to create a gap of over a minute. Verstappen handed the car to teammate Lulham for the second stint; Lulham crossed the line to win the race for the team, 24 seconds ahead of the car in second place.

In preparation for his participation at the 2026 24 Hours of Nürburgring, Verstappen took part in the second round of the 2026 Nürburgring Langstrecken-Serie, driving a Mercedes-AMG GT3 Evo run by Winward Racing. In a qualifying session affected by multiple code 60 sections, Verstappen put together a clean lap and achieved his maiden NLS pole position. After fighting for the lead with Christopher Haase throughout the opening stint, the No. 3 Verstappen Mercedes-AMG broke away from the field, allowing Verstappen, Daniel Juncadella, and Jules Gounon to win by almost a minute. Following the race, the team was disqualified for using seven sets of tyres, which exceeded the limit of six allowed for race day.

=== Sim racing ===
In his free time, Verstappen competes in sim racing. Verstappen stated that it helps him with his real-life racing, keeping him "ready to go". In 2015, he became a member of Team Redline, a European professional sim racing team. On 23 March 2026, he absorbed the team into his wider Verstappen Racing motorsport project, rebranding the esports organization to Verstappen Sim Racing. As part of the rebrand, the team now also serves as a driver development pathway from virtual racing into real-world competition.

He has also gained notoriety from critics for his sim racing activities clashing with Grand Prix weekends in some cases, most notably in the 2024 Hungarian Grand Prix, where he criticised Red Bull Racing's strategy calls and the RB20's lack of performance over team radio. Verstappen had taken part in an iRacing sim racing event prior to the Grand Prix, racing until 3:00 a.m.

==== iRacing special events (2020–present) ====
Verstappen has competed in several marquee events on iRacing since February 2019, when he entered the Bathurst 12 Special Event—a 12-hour virtual team endurance race—alongside Lando Norris. The pair won the Spa 24 Special Event in July. Verstappen won the Petit Le Mans Special Event in October 2020. Later that year, Haas driver and R8G eSports founder Romain Grosjean deemed Verstappen to be the "fastest" driver in sim racing. He entered the eighth round of the 2023 AMX Global League at Imola, winning the first heat.

Verstappen entered the Daytona 24 Special Event in January 2024, winning the GTD class with Redline. In May, Verstappen received media attention for entering the Nürburgring 24 Special Event on the same weekend as the Emilia Romagna Grand Prix; he won both events, achieving a record-equalling eighth consecutive pole position at the latter. Following his victory at the former, Ed Hardy of Autosport opined that Verstappen had "firmly established himself as one of the best sim racers in the world". Verstappen won his second Spa 24 Special Event in July that year, completing a perfect season of 24-hour special events.

==== Le Mans Virtual (2020–2023) ====
Verstappen competed in the 24 Hours of Le Mans Virtual on rFactor 2 in 2020, 2022 and 2023—hosted by Automobile Club de l'Ouest and the FIA World Endurance Championship—as well as two further rounds of the 2022–23 Le Mans Virtual Series in the LMP2 class. He described the former competition as a "clown show" after a technical issue saw him retire from the lead of the 2023 edition, subsequently finishing runner-up in the overall championship to Porsche Coanda.

== Verstappen Racing ==
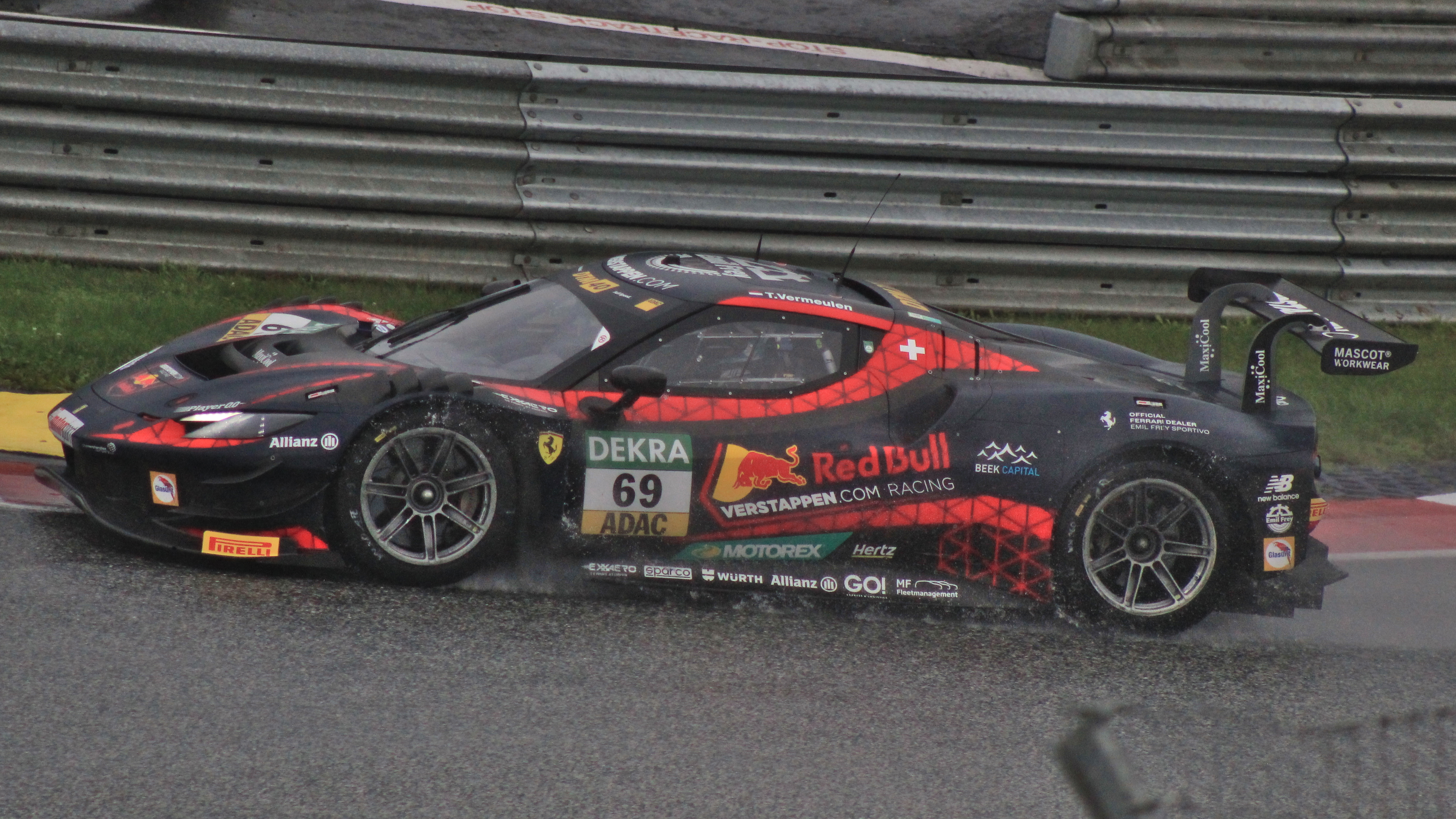
In 2022, Verstappen founded the eponymous racing team Verstappen.com Racing.

Verstappen founded the eponymous racing team Verstappen.com Racing in 2022, supporting his father Jos in rallying and Thierry Vermeulen in the ADAC GT Masters. The following year, the project expanded to GT World Challenge Europe Sprint Cup and the Deutsche Tourenwagen Masters, linking up with Ferrari customer Emil Frey Racing. In 2025, in conjunction with this effort, Verstappen.com made its debut as a standalone team in the Endurance Cup, fielding a 2 Seas Motorsport–run Aston Martin Vantage AMR GT3 Evo for Vermeulen, Harry King and sim racing convert Chris Lulham; they took the Gold Cup victory at the 24 Hours of Spa.

2026 saw the team rebrand to Verstappen Racing as it switched to Mercedes-AMG machinery and graduated to the Pro class, with a season-long GT World Challenge Europe entry with 2 Seas Motorsport, fielding Lulham and Daniel Juncadella in the Sprint Cup, with Jules Gounon joining for the Endurance Cup rounds. In March 2026, it was announced that both the team and Verstappen would make their 24 Hours of Nürburgring debut, partnering with Winward Racing. Verstappen drove the No. 3 Red Bull–liveried Mercedes-AMG GT3 Evo alongside Gounon, Juncadella and Lucas Auer. Verstappen first forayed into driver development that July, signing Belgian prodigy Dries Van Langendonck as a junior member of his team.

== Personal life ==
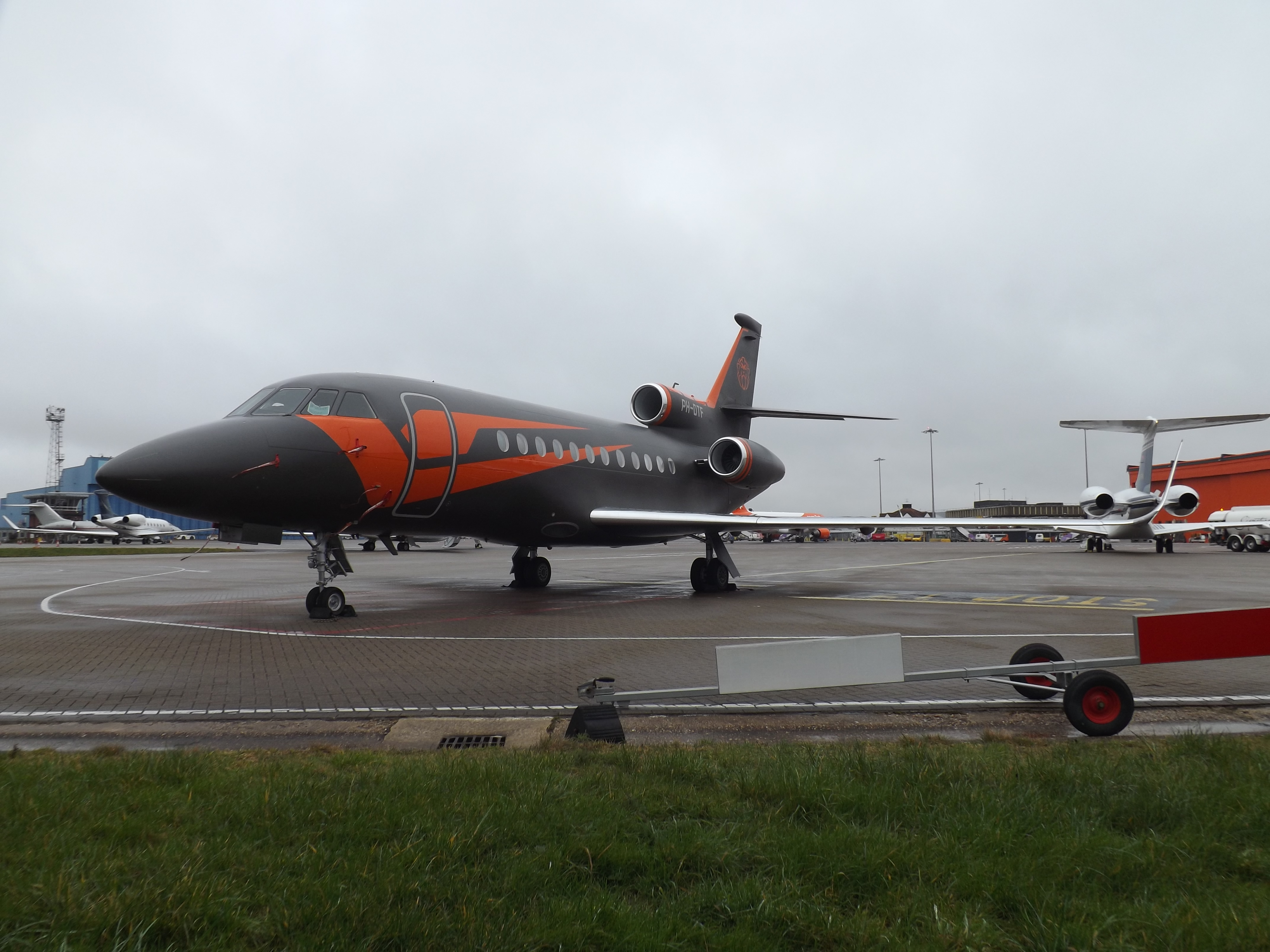
Verstappen's former aircraft (PH-DTF) at Luton Airport in 2022

Verstappen holds dual Dutch and Belgian citizenship, and decided to compete with a Dutch racing licence, as his father Jos did. He stated in 2014 that he "feels more Dutch", having spent more time with his father than with his mother during his childhood, as well as his upbringing in Maaseik, a Belgian town at the Dutch border. The following year, Verstappen added that he "actually only lived in Belgium to sleep", and that he "was raised as a Dutch person and that's how [he feels]". In 2022, Verstappen stated that he appreciates both sides and is "half-half at the end of the day". In addition to his native Dutch, he is fluent in English and German, with limited proficiency in French.

He competed in Formula One for over a season before obtaining a road driving licence on his 18th birthday. Verstappen moved to Monaco in October 2015 where he has lived ever since. In November 2020, Verstappen bought a Dassault Falcon 900EX aircraft from Virgin Galactic. The aircraft, registered PH-DTF, was operated by Exxaero. In January 2025, he acquired a Mangusta GranSport 33 yacht, named Unleash the Lion. The following month, he sold the Falcon 900EX and purchased a Dassault Falcon 8X, registered PH-UTL, which is also operated by Exxaero.

Verstappen is a supporter of the Barcelona and PSV Eindhoven football clubs. In September 2022, he was appointed an Officer of the Order of Orange-Nassau in recognition of his racing achievements. Verstappen has been dating Brazilian-Dutch model Kelly Piquet, daughter of three-time World Drivers' Champion Nelson Piquet, since October 2020. They had their first daughter in April 2025.

== Awards and honours ==
=== Formula One ===
- Formula One World Drivers' Championship: 2021, 2022, 2023, 2024
- DHL Fastest Lap Award: 2022, 2023
- FIA Action of the Year: 2015, 2016, 2019, 2025
- FIA Rookie of the Year: 2015
- FIA Personality of the Year: 2015, 2016, 2017
- Lorenzo Bandini Trophy: 2016
- Overtake Award: 2025

=== Other awards ===
- Time 100: 2024
- Laureus World Sportsman of the Year: 2022
- Dutch Sportsman of the Year: 2016, 2021, 2022
- Autosport International Racing Driver Award: 2021, 2022, 2023, 2024, 2025
- Best Driver ESPY Award: 2023, 2024, 2025
- FIA Action of the Year: 2014, 2015, 2016, 2019, 2025
- Autosport Awards Rookie of the Year: 2015
- Autosport Awards Moment of the Year: 2024

=== Orders and special awards ===
- Netherlands
  - Officer of the Order of Orange-Nassau (2022)

== Karting record ==
=== Karting career summary ===
Season	Series	Team	Position
2005	VAS Championship – Mini Junior		**1st**
2005	Dutch N.A.B. Championship – Mini Junior		16th
2005	Limburgs Kart Championship – Mini Junior		**2nd**
2006	VAS Championship – Mini Junior		**1st**
2007	Chrono Dutch Rotax Max Challenge – Mini Max		35th
2007	Dutch Championship – Rotax Mini Max		**1st**
2007	Rotax Max Challenge Belgium – Mini Max	Jos Verstappen	**1st**
2008	VAS Championship – Mini		NC
2008	Belgian Championship – Cadet	Jos Verstappen	**1st**
2008	Rotax Max Challenge Belgium – Mini Max	Jos Verstappen	**1st**
2008	BNL Karting Series – Mini Max	Verstappen Racing	**1st**
2009	Rotax Max Challenge Belgium – Mini Max		**1st**
2009	Belgian Championship – KF5	Pex Racing Team	**1st**
2009	BNL Karting Series – Mini Max	Pex Racing Team	**1st**
2010	South Garda Winter Cup – KF3	CRG	**2nd**
2010	WSK Euro Series – KF3	CRG	**1st**
2010	CIK-FIA European Championship Qualification Region Nord – KF3	CRG	**2nd**
2010	CIK-FIA European Championship – KF3	CRG	5th
2010	CIK-FIA World Cup – KF3	CRG	**2nd**
2010	Bridgestone Cup European Final – KF3	CRG	**1st**
2010	WSK World Series – KF3	CRG	**1st**
2010	WSK Nations Cup – KF3	CRG	**1st**
2011	South Garda Winter Cup – KF3	CRG	**2nd**
2011	WSK Master Series – KF3	CRG	19th
2011	North European Trophy – KF3	CRG	DNF
2011	CIK-FIA European Championship – KF3	CRG	14th
2011	WSK Euro Series – KF3	CRG	**1st**
2011	CIK-FIA World Cup – KF3	CRG	DNF
2012	South Garda Winter Cup – KF2	Intrepid Driver Program	**1st**
2012	BNL Karting Series – KZ2	Intrepid Driver Program	10th
2012	WSK Master Series – KF2	Intrepid Driver Program	**1st**
2012	CIK-FIA European Championship – KF2	Intrepid Driver Program	10th
2012	WSK Euro Series – KF2	Intrepid Driver Program	6th
2012	German Karting Championship – KZ2	Intrepid Driver Program	NC
2012	CIK-FIA World Cup – KZ2	CRG	DNF
2012	CIK-FIA World Cup – KF2	CRG	**2nd**
2012	CIK-FIA World Championship – KF1	CRG	8th
2012	SKUSA SuperNationals – KZ2	PSL Karting	21st
2013	South Garda Winter Cup – KF2	CRG	**1st**
2013	Rotax Max Euro Challenge – Senior	CRG	32nd
2013	WSK Euro Series – KZ1	CRG	**1st**
2013	WSK Master Series – KZ2	CRG	**1st**
2013	CIK-FIA European Championship – KF	CRG	**1st**
2013	CIK-FIA European Championship – KZ	CRG	**1st**
2013	CIK-FIA World Championship – KF	CRG	**3rd**
2013	CIK-FIA World Championship – KZ	CRG	**1st**

=== Complete CIK-FIA Karting European Championship results ===
(key) (Races in bold indicate pole position) (Races in italics indicate fastest lap)

Year	Team	Class	1	2	3	4	5	6	DC	Points
2010	CRG	KF3	GEN; QH; 12	GEN; PF; 3	GEN; F 5				5th	-
2011	CRG	KF3	ZUE; QH; 2	ZUE; PF; 16	ZUE; F 14				14th	-
2012	Intrepid	KF2	WAC; QH; 1	**WAC**; **R1** (2)	WAC; R2; 1	PFI; QH; 20	PFI; R1; DSQ	PFI; R2; DSQ	10th	25
2013	CRG	KF	ALC; QH; 11	ALC; PF; 2	ALC; F 3	ORT; QH; 2	ORT; PF; 2	ORT; F 2	1st	36
2013	CRG	KZ	WAC; QH; 1	**WAC**; **PF**; 1	**WAC**; **F** 1	GEN; QH; 9	GEN; PF; 2	**GEN**; **F** 1	1st	50

=== Complete CIK-FIA Karting World Cup results ===
(key) (Races in bold indicate pole position) (Races in italics indicate fastest lap)

Year	Team	Class	1	2	3	4	DC
2010	CRG	KF3	BRA; QP; 2	BRA; QH; 2	BRA; PF; 5	BRA; F 2	2nd
2011	CRG	KF3	SAR; QP; 2	SAR; QH; 2	SAR; PF; 2	SAR; F Ret	DNF
2012	CRG	KF2	SAR; QP; 3	SAR; QH; 1	SAR; PF; 2	SAR; F 2	2nd

=== Complete CIK-FIA Karting World Championship results ===
(key) (Races in bold indicate pole position) (Races in italics indicate fastest lap)

Year	Team	Class	1	2	3	4	5	6	7	8	9	10	11	12	DC	Points
2012	Intrepid	KF1	SUZ; QH1; 31	SUZ; R1; 13	SUZ; R2; 4	SUZ; QH2; 2	SUZ; R3; 3	SUZ; R4; Ret	MAC; Q1; 1	**MAC**; **R1**; 2	MAC; R2; Ret	MAC; Q2; 2	MAC; R1; 17	MAC; R2; Ret	8th	52
2013	CRG	KF	PFI; QH; 1	**PFI**; **PF1**; 1	**PFI**; **F** 1	BHR; QH; 2	BHR; PF; 1	**BHR**; **F** DSQ							3rd	25
2013	CRG	KZ	VAR; QH; 2	**VAR**; **PF1**; 1	**VAR**; **F** 1										1st	50

== Racing record ==
=== Racing career summary ===
Season	Series	Team	Races	Wins	Poles	F/Laps	Podiums	Points	Position
2014	Florida Winter Series	—N/a	12	2	3	3	5	—N/a	—N/a
2014	FIA Formula 3 European Championship	Van Amersfoort Racing	33	10	7	7	16	411	3rd
2014	Zandvoort Masters	Motopark	1	1	1	0	1	—N/a	1st
2014	Macau Grand Prix	Van Amersfoort Racing	1	0	0	1	0	—N/a	7th
2014	Formula One	Scuderia Toro Rosso	Test driver						
2015	Formula One	Scuderia Toro Rosso	19	0	0	0	0	49	12th
2016	Formula One	Scuderia Toro Rosso	4	0	0	0	0	204	5th
2016	Formula One	Red Bull Racing	17	1	0	1	7	204	5th
2017	Formula One	Red Bull Racing	20	2	0	1	4	168	6th
2018	Formula One	Aston Martin Red Bull Racing	21	2	0	2	11	249	4th
2019	Formula One	Aston Martin Red Bull Racing	21	3	2	3	9	278	3rd
2020	Formula One	Aston Martin Red Bull Racing	17	2	1	3	11	214	3rd
2021	Formula One	Red Bull Racing Honda	22	10	10	6	18	395.5	1st
2022	Formula One	Oracle Red Bull Racing	22	15	7	5	17	454	1st
2023	Formula One	Oracle Red Bull Racing	22	19	12	9	21	575	1st
2024	Formula One	Oracle Red Bull Racing	24	9	8	3	14	437	1st
2025	Formula One	Oracle Red Bull Racing	24	8	8	3	15	421	2nd
2025	Nürburgring Langstrecken-Serie – Cup 3	Lionspeed GP	1	0	0	0	0	—N/a	NC†
2025	Nürburgring Langstrecken-Serie – SP9	Emil Frey Racing	1	1	0	1	1	—N/a	NC†
2026	Formula One	Oracle Red Bull Racing	21	3	3	2	12	279*	2nd*
2026	Nürburgring Langstrecken-Serie – SP9	Mercedes-AMG Team Verstappen Racing	2	0	1	1	0	—N/a	NC†
2026	24 Hours of Nürburgring – SP9	Mercedes-AMG Team Verstappen Racing	1	0	0	0	0	—N/a	19th
2026	Intercontinental GT Challenge	Mercedes-AMG Team Verstappen Racing	1	0	0	0	0	—N/a	NC†
2026	GT World Challenge Europe Endurance Cup	Mercedes-AMG Team Verstappen Racing	1	0	0	0	0	—N/a	NC†

^{†} As Verstappen was a guest driver, he was ineligible for championship points.
* Season still in progress.

=== Complete FIA Formula 3 European Championship results ===
(key) (Races in bold indicate pole position) (Races in italics indicate fastest lap)

Year	Entrant	Engine	1	2	3	4	5	6	7	8	9	10	11	12	13	14	15	16	17	18	19	20	21	22	23	24	25	26	27	28	29	30	31	32	33	DC	Points
2014	Van Amersfoort Racing	Volkswagen	SIL; 1 Ret	SIL; 2; 5	SIL; 3; 2	HOC; 1 Ret	**HOC**; **2** DNS	**HOC**; **3**; 1	PAU; 1; 3	PAU; 2 Ret	PAU; 3 Ret	HUN; 1 Ret	HUN; 2; 16	HUN; 3; 4	SPA; 1; 1	SPA; 2; 1	SPA; 3; 1	NOR; 1; 1	**NOR**; **2**; 1	**NOR**; **3**; 1	MSC; 1; 3	MSC; 2 Ret	MSC; 3; 2	RBR; 1; 5	RBR; 2; 4	RBR; 3; 12	**NÜR**; **1**; 1	NÜR; 2 Ret	NÜR; 3; 3	IMO; 1 Ret	IMO; 2; 2	**IMO**; **3**; 1	**HOC**; **1**; 1	HOC; 2; 5	HOC; 3; 6	**3rd**	**411**

=== Complete Macau Grand Prix results ===
Year	Team	Car	Qualifying	Quali Race	Main race	Ref
2014	(Netherlands) Van Amersfoort Racing	Dallara F312	**3rd**	DNF	7th	

=== Complete Formula One results ===
(key) (Races in bold indicate pole position; races in italics indicate fastest lap; ^{superscript} indicates point-scoring sprint position)

Year	Entrant	Chassis	Engine	1	2	3	4	5	6	7	8	9	10	11	12	13	14	15	16	17	18	19	20	21	22	23	24	WDC	Points
2014	Scuderia Toro Rosso	Toro Rosso STR9	Renault Energy F1-2014 1.6 V6 t	AUS	MAL	BHR	CHN	ESP	MON	CAN	AUT	GBR	GER	HUN	BEL	ITA	SIN	JPN; TD	RUS	USA; TD	BRA; TD	ABU						–	–
2015	Scuderia Toro Rosso	Toro Rosso STR10	Renault Energy F1-2015 1.6 V6 t	AUS; Ret	MAL; 7	CHN; 17^{†}	BHR; Ret	ESP; 11	MON; Ret	CAN; 15	AUT; 8	GBR; Ret	HUN; 4	BEL; 8	ITA; 12	SIN; 8	JPN; 9	RUS; 10	USA; 4	MEX; 9	BRA; 9	ABU; 16						12th	49
2016	Scuderia Toro Rosso	Toro Rosso STR11	Ferrari 060 1.6 V6 t	AUS; 10	BHR; 6	CHN; 8	RUS; Ret																					5th	204
2016	Red Bull Racing	Red Bull Racing RB12	TAG Heuer F1-2016 1.6 V6 t					ESP; 1	MON; Ret	CAN; 4	EUR; 8	AUT; 2	GBR; 2	HUN; 5	GER; 3	BEL; 11	ITA; 7	SIN; 6	MAL; 2	JPN; 2	USA; Ret	MEX; 4	BRA; 3	ABU; 4				5th	204
2017	Red Bull Racing	Red Bull Racing RB13	TAG Heuer F1-2017 1.6 V6 t	AUS; 5	CHN; 3	BHR; Ret	RUS; 5	ESP; Ret	MON; 5	CAN; Ret	AZE; Ret	AUT; Ret	GBR; 4	HUN; 5	BEL; Ret	ITA; 10	SIN; Ret	MAL; 1	JPN; 2	USA; 4	MEX; 1	BRA; 5	ABU; 5					6th	168
2018	Aston Martin Red Bull Racing	Red Bull Racing RB14	TAG Heuer F1-2018 1.6 V6 t	AUS; 6	BHR; Ret	CHN; 5	AZE; Ret	ESP; 3	MON; 9	CAN; 3	FRA; 2	AUT; 1	GBR; 15^{†}	GER; 4	HUN; Ret	BEL; 3	ITA; 5	SIN; 2	RUS; 5	JPN; 3	USA; 2	MEX; 1	BRA; 2	ABU; 3				4th	249
2019	Aston Martin Red Bull Racing	Red Bull Racing RB15	Honda RA619H 1.6 V6 t	AUS; 3	BHR; 4	CHN; 4	AZE; 4	ESP; 3	MON; 4	CAN; 5	FRA; 4	AUT; 1	GBR; 5	GER; 1	**HUN**; 2	BEL; Ret	ITA; 8	SIN; 3	RUS; 4	JPN; Ret	MEX; 6	USA; 3	**BRA**; 1	ABU; 2				**3rd**	**278**
2020	Aston Martin Red Bull Racing	Red Bull Racing RB16	Honda RA620H 1.6 V6 t	AUT; Ret	STY; 3	HUN; 2	GBR; 2	70A; 1	ESP; 2	BEL; 3	ITA; Ret	TUS; Ret	RUS; 2	EIF; 2	POR; 3	EMI; Ret	TUR; 6	BHR; 2	SKH; Ret	**ABU**; 1								3rd	214
2021	Red Bull Racing Honda	Red Bull Racing RB16B	Honda RA621H 1.6 V6 t	**BHR**; 2	EMI; 1	POR; 2	ESP; 2	MON; 1	AZE; 18†	**FRA**; 1	**STY**; 1	**AUT**; 1	**GBR**; Ret^{1}	HUN; 9	**BEL**; 1‡	**NED**; 1	**ITA**; Ret^{2}	RUS; 2	TUR; 2	**USA**; 1	MXC; 1	SAP; 2^{2}	QAT; 2	SAU; 2	**ABU**; 1			1st	395.5
2022	Oracle Red Bull Racing	Red Bull Racing RB18	Red Bull RBPTH001 1.6 V6 t	BHR; 19†	SAU; 1	AUS; Ret	**EMI**; 1^{1}	MIA; 1	ESP; 1	MON; 3	AZE; 1	**CAN**; 1	GBR; 7	**AUT**; 2^{1}	FRA; 1	HUN; 1	BEL; 1	**NED**; 1	ITA; 1	SIN; 7	**JPN**; 1	USA; 1	**MXC**; 1	SAP; 6^{4}	**ABU**; 1			1st	454
2023	Oracle Red Bull Racing	Red Bull Racing RB19	Honda RBPTH001 1.6 V6 t	**BHR**; 1	SAU; 2	**AUS**; 1	AZE; 2^{3}	MIA; 1	**MON**; 1	**ESP**; 1	**CAN**; 1	**AUT**; 1^{1}	**GBR**; 1	HUN; 1	BEL; 1^{1}	**NED**; 1	ITA; 1	SIN; 5	**JPN**; 1	**QAT**; 1^{2}	USA; 1^{1}	MXC; 1	**SAP**; 1^{1}	LVG; 1	**ABU**; 1			1st	575
2024	Oracle Red Bull Racing	Red Bull Racing RB20	Honda RBPTH002 1.6 V6 t	**BHR**; 1	**SAU**; 1	**AUS**; Ret	**JPN**; 1	**CHN**; 1^{1}	**MIA**; 2^{1}	**EMI**; 1	MON; 6	CAN; 1	ESP; 1	**AUT**; 5^{1}	GBR; 2	HUN; 5	BEL; 4	NED; 2	ITA; 6	AZE; 5	SIN; 2	USA; 3^{1}	MXC; 6	SAP; 1^{4}	LVG; 5	QAT; 1^{8}	ABU; 6	1st	437
2025	Oracle Red Bull Racing	Red Bull Racing RB21	Honda RBPTH003 1.6 V6 t	AUS; 2	CHN; 4^{3}	**JPN**; 1	BHR; 6	**SAU**; 2	**MIA**; 4	EMI; 1	MON; 4	ESP; 10	CAN; 2	AUT; Ret	**GBR**; 5	BEL; 4^{1}	HUN; 9	NED; 2	**ITA**; 1	**AZE**; 1	SIN; 2	**USA**; 1^{1}	MXC; 3	SAP; 3^{4}	LVG; 1	QAT; 1^{4}	**ABU**; 1	2nd	421
2026	Oracle Red Bull Racing	Red Bull Racing RB22	Red Bull Ford DM01 1.6 V6 t	AUS; 6	CHN; Ret	JPN; 8	MIA; 5^{5}	CAN; 3^{7}	MON; Ret	BCN; 4	AUT; 2	GBR; 20†^{6}	BEL; 3	HUN; 2	NED; Ret^{6}	ITA; 3	ESP; 2	AZE; 2	**BHR**; 1	**SIN**; 1^{1}	USA; 3	MXC; 1	SAP; 2	**LVG**	QAT	ABU		2nd*	279*

^{†} Did not finish, but was classified as he had completed more than 90% of the race distance.
^{‡} Half points awarded as less than 75% of race distance was completed.
* Season still in progress.

==== Formula One records ====
Verstappen made his Formula One debut at the 2015 Australian Grand Prix, and has since gone on to hold over 90 records in Formula One, including most wins in a season (19), most podium finishes in a season (21), most consecutive wins (10), and most consecutive pole positions (8).

=== Complete GT World Challenge Europe results ===
==== GT World Challenge Europe Endurance Cup ====
(key) (Races in bold indicate pole position; races in italics indicate fastest lap)

Year	Entrant	Car	Class	1	2	3	4	5	6	7	Pos	Points
2026	Mercedes-AMG Team Verstappen Racing	Mercedes-AMG GT3 Evo	Pro	LEC	MNZ	SPA; 6H	SPA; 12H	SPA; 24H	NÜR	ALG; 9	NC†	—

^{†} As Verstappen was a guest driver, he was ineligible for championship points.

== Notes ==
Awards and achievements
Sporting positions
Preceded by Felix Rosenqvist	Zandvoort Masters; Winner; 2014	Succeeded by Antonio Giovinazzi
Preceded by Lewis Hamilton	Formula One; World Drivers' Champion; 2021–2024	Succeeded by Lando Norris
Awards
Preceded by Inaugural	FIA Action of the Year; 2014–2016	Succeeded by Esapekka Lappi
Preceded by Lewis Hamilton	FIA Personality of the Year; 2015–2017	Succeeded by Lewis Hamilton
Preceded by Daniil Kvyat	FIA Rookie of the Year; 2015	Succeeded by Kevin Hansen
Preceded by Daniil Kvyat	Autosport Awards; Rookie of the Year; 2015	Succeeded by Pascal Wehrlein
Preceded by Mercedes AMG Petronas F1 Team	Lorenzo Bandini Trophy; 2016	Succeeded by Scuderia Ferrari
Preceded by Sjinkie Knegt	Dutch Sportsman of the Year; 2016	Succeeded by Tom Dumoulin
Preceded by Mathieu van der Poel	Dutch Sportsman of the Year; 2021–2022	Succeeded by Mathieu van der Poel
Preceded by Lewis Hamilton	Autosport Awards; International Racing Driver Award; 2021–2025	Succeeded by Incumbent
Preceded by Rafael Nadal	Laureus World Sports Award for Sportsman of the Year; 2022	Succeeded by Lionel Messi
Preceded by Lewis Hamilton	DHL Fastest Lap Award; 2022–2023	Succeeded by Lando Norris
Preceded by Kyle Larson	Best Driver ESPY Award; 2023–2025	Succeeded by Lando Norris
Records
Preceded by Jaime Alguersuari; 19 years, 125 days (2009 Hungarian Grand Prix)	Youngest driver to start a Formula One race 17 years, 166 days (2015 Australian Grand Prix)	Succeeded by Incumbent
Preceded by Daniil Kvyat; 19 years, 324 days (2014 Australian Grand Prix)	Youngest driver to score points in Formula One; 17 years, 180 days (2015 Malaysian Grand Prix)	Succeeded by Incumbent
Preceded by Sebastian Vettel; 20 years, 89 days (2007 Japanese Grand Prix)	Youngest race leader, for at least one lap in Formula One; 18 years, 228 days (2016 Spanish Grand Prix)	Succeeded by Andrea Kimi Antonelli; 18 years, 225 days (2025 Japanese Grand Prix)
Preceded by Sebastian Vettel; 21 years, 73 days (2008 Italian Grand Prix)	Youngest driver to score a podium position in Formula One; 18 years, 228 days (2016 Spanish Grand Prix)	Succeeded by Incumbent
Preceded by Sebastian Vettel; 21 years, 73 days (2008 Italian Grand Prix)	Youngest Grand Prix winner 18 years, 228 days (2016 Spanish Grand Prix)	Succeeded by Incumbent
Preceded by Nico Rosberg; 20 years, 258 days (2006 Bahrain Grand Prix)	Youngest driver to set fastest lap in Formula One; 19 years, 44 days (2016 Brazilian Grand Prix)	Succeeded by Andrea Kimi Antonelli; 18 years, 225 days (2025 Japanese Grand Prix)
Preceded by Sebastian Vettel; 24 years, 119 days (2011 Indian Grand Prix)	Youngest driver to complete a grand slam in Formula One; 23 years, 277 days (2021 Austrian Grand Prix)	Succeeded by Incumbent
