= 2026 Karting European Championship =

57th edition of the CIK-FIA European Championship

The 2026 Mondokart.com FIA Karting European Championship was the 57th edition of the CIK-FIA European Championship, a kart racing competition organised and sanctioned by the Commission Internationale de Karting (CIK-FIA). The European Championship was held in four open classes—OK, OK-J, KZ, and KZ2—as well as two arrive-and-drive classes: Senior (A&D-S) and Junior (A&D-J).

OK and OK-J were held across four rounds between 9 April and 2 August at La Conca, Italy; Valencia, Spain; Mülsen, Germany; and Kristianstad, Sweden. KZ and KZ2 were held across two rounds between 21 May and 5 July at Genk, Belgium; and Sarno, Italy. The inaugural arrive-and-drive European Championship was held in A&D-S and A&D-J on 17–19 July at Słomczyn, Poland—the international debut for the circuit.

The senior class, OK, was won by reigning junior World Champion Noah Baglin, holding off compatriot Zac Drummond and Dean Hoogendoorn. Will Green of Williams dominated the junior OK-J division over Daniel Mirón. The professional KZ gearbox class was won by Émilien Denner, ahead of Danilo Albanese and Viktor Gustavsson. With victory in the final race, 17-year-old Kimi Tani beat former OK World Champion Matheus Morgatto and Maximilian Schleimer to the KZ2 title. The arrive-and-drive contest was dominated by Polish drivers, with Kacper Turoboyski (A&D-S) and Maksymilian Piątek (A&D-J) emerging victorious.

== Background ==
The Commission Internationale de Karting (CIK-FIA) was founded in 1962 and held the first CIK-FIA European Nations' Cup that year, which was won by Great Britain. The individual CIK-FIA European Championship was inaugurated eight years later and became the secondary international title to the CIK-FIA World Championship. It began utilising a multi-round format around 1991. As of the beginning of 2026, six previous European Champions had progressed to win the Formula One World Drivers' Championship, (Note: As of the beginning of 2026, six previous European Champions had progressed to win the Formula One World Drivers' Championship: Michael Schumacher (1987, ICA); Jenson Button (1997, FSA); Lewis Hamilton (2000, FA); Sebastian Vettel (2001, ICA-J); Max Verstappen (2013, KF and KZ); and; Lando Norris (2013, KF-J).) while Marco Ardigò won a record five titles between 2005 and 2016. The reigning European Champions were Christian Costoya (OK), Dean Hoogendoorn (OK-J), Mattéo Spirgel (KZ), Maksim Orlov (KZ2), and Antonio Piccioni (KZ2-M).

=== Classes ===
There were six classes—two open direct-drive classes, two open gearbox classes, and two arrive-and-drive classes—contested across the 2026 season:

- Original Kart (OK), the senior direct-drive class since 2016 for drivers aged 14 and over, often regarded as the feeder class to Formula 4.
- OK-Junior (OK-J), the junior direct-drive class since 2016 for drivers aged 12 to 14.
- KZ, the primary gearbox class since 2007 for drivers aged 15 and over, often regarded as the professional class.
- KZ2, the secondary gearbox class since 2007 for drivers aged 15 and over.
- A&D-Senior (A&D-S), the senior arrive-and-drive class on its European Championship debut for drivers aged 14 to 15.
- A&D-Junior (A&D-J), the junior arrive-and-drive class on its European Championship debut for drivers aged 12 to 14.

The KZ2-Masters (KZ2-M) class was not held for the first time since 2023.

=== Format ===
Open classes

The five-stage format used since 2022 remained in effect for the 2026 season in all open classes, with each round held over a three-day weekend composed of free practice (FP), qualifying practice (QP), qualifying heats (QH), super heats (SH), and a final:

- Friday: FP (morning), QP + QH (afternoon);
- Saturday: warm-up + QH;
- Sunday: warm-up + SH (morning), final (afternoon).

In rounds with less than 37 entrants, there were three QHs as opposed to the usual six, as well as a single SH on the Saturday afternoon rather than two on Sunday morning; a new format was introduced for rounds with more than 108 entrants.

Arrive-and-drive classes

The arrive-and-drive championships used a unique format held over a three-day weekend composed of FP, sprints, QH, and a final:

- Friday: FP;
- Saturday: warm-up + sprints (morning), QH (afternoon);
- Sunday: warm-up + QH (morning), final (afternoon).

Each driver was assorted into one of two groups for the sprints, which determined the grid order for three QHs; the classification of the QHs set the grid for the final. All karts for arrive-and-drive were provided by the OTK Kart Group, with Kosmic chassis, Vortex engines, and Vega tyres.

== Calendar ==
The 2026 calendar featured four events in OK and OK-J, two events in KZ and KZ2, and a single event in the arrive-and-drive classes:

Calendar
| Circuit | Dates | Classes | Map of circuit locations |
|---|---|---|---|
| World Circuit La Conca (Muro Leccese, Italy) | 9–12 April | OK | Map of Europe with circuit locations for the 2026 CIK-FIA European Championship |
| World Circuit La Conca (Muro Leccese, Italy) | 9–12 April | OK-J | Map of Europe with circuit locations for the 2026 CIK-FIA European Championship |
| Kartódromo Internacional Lucas Guerrero (Valencia, Spain) | 7–10 May | OK | Map of Europe with circuit locations for the 2026 CIK-FIA European Championship |
| Kartódromo Internacional Lucas Guerrero (Valencia, Spain) | 7–10 May | OK-J | Map of Europe with circuit locations for the 2026 CIK-FIA European Championship |
| Karting Genk (Genk, Belgium) | 21–24 May | KZ | Map of Europe with circuit locations for the 2026 CIK-FIA European Championship |
| Karting Genk (Genk, Belgium) | 21–24 May | KZ2 | Map of Europe with circuit locations for the 2026 CIK-FIA European Championship |
| Motorsportarena Mülsen (Mülsen, Germany) | 11–14 June | OK | Map of Europe with circuit locations for the 2026 CIK-FIA European Championship |
| Motorsportarena Mülsen (Mülsen, Germany) | 11–14 June | OK-J | Map of Europe with circuit locations for the 2026 CIK-FIA European Championship |
| Circuito Internazionale Napoli (Sarno, Italy) | 2–5 July | KZ | Map of Europe with circuit locations for the 2026 CIK-FIA European Championship |
| Circuito Internazionale Napoli (Sarno, Italy) | 2–5 July | KZ2 | Map of Europe with circuit locations for the 2026 CIK-FIA European Championship |
| Autodrom Słomczyn (Słomczyn, Poland) | 17–19 July | A&D-S | Map of Europe with circuit locations for the 2026 CIK-FIA European Championship |
| Autodrom Słomczyn (Słomczyn, Poland) | 17–19 July | A&D-J | Map of Europe with circuit locations for the 2026 CIK-FIA European Championship |
| Åsum Ring (Kristianstad, Sweden) | 30 July – 2 August | OK | Map of Europe with circuit locations for the 2026 CIK-FIA European Championship |
| Åsum Ring (Kristianstad, Sweden) | 30 July – 2 August | OK-J | Map of Europe with circuit locations for the 2026 CIK-FIA European Championship |

=== Calendar changes ===
The 2026 edition retained the four-round OK and OK-J format, as well as a two-round KZ and KZ2 season, reduced from three events. KZ2-Masters (KZ2-M)—the over-35 gearbox class—was removed from the calendar, having only been held at the European Championship for two years. Each event was preceded by a Champions of the Future (COTF) round the week before. The arrive-and-drive category featured in the European Championship for the first time, alongside the Asia-Pacific and South American Championships, in both a senior (A&D-S) and a junior (A&D-J) class, following their successful World Cup debuts in 2025. The latter three OK and OK-J rounds were supported by the senior CIK-FIA Academy Trophy, while both rounds in KZ and KZ2 were supported by its junior counterpart.

The lone venue for A&D, Słomczyn, made its European Championship debut in the first CIK-FIA event held in Poland since 1996. It had initially been planned for three rounds but was scaled-down "to broaden the reach of the championship and reduce the commitment required to participate"; Kartmag reported that logistical challenges with the OTK Group and low registration numbers led to the Angerville and Aspar cancellations, questioning the saturation of the European karting market. The calendar also saw the return of four former World Championship venues: La Conca, Genk, Sarno, and Kristianstad. La Conca made its first appearance at a CIK-FIA event in 11 years.

== Results and standings ==
=== Results ===
Results
| Circuit | Class | Pole position | Qualifying heats | Super heats | Winner | Chassis | Engine | Fastest lap |
|---|---|---|---|---|---|---|---|---|
| (Italy) La Conca | OK | (Turkey) İskender Zülfikari | (United Kingdom) Noah Baglin | (United Kingdom) Noah Baglin (A) | (United Kingdom) Noah Baglin | KR | IAME | (Italy) Filippo Sala |
| (Italy) La Conca | OK | (Turkey) İskender Zülfikari | (United Kingdom) Noah Baglin | (Germany) Luke Kornder (B) | (United Kingdom) Noah Baglin | KR | IAME | (Italy) Filippo Sala |
| (Italy) La Conca | OK-J | (Belgium) Priam Bruno | (Spain) Daniel Mirón | (Spain) Daniel Mirón (A) | (United Kingdom) Will Green | KR | IAME | (Italy) Gioele Girardello |
| (Italy) La Conca | OK-J | (Belgium) Priam Bruno | (Spain) Daniel Mirón | (Czech Republic) Zdeněk Bábíček (B) | (United Kingdom) Will Green | KR | IAME | (Italy) Gioele Girardello |
| (Spain) Valencia | OK | (United Kingdom) Noah Baglin | (Austria) Niklas Schaufler | (Austria) Niklas Schaufler (A) | (United Kingdom) Noah Baglin | KR | IAME | (United Kingdom) Noah Baglin |
| (Spain) Valencia | OK | (United Kingdom) Noah Baglin | (Austria) Niklas Schaufler | (Switzerland) Dan Allemann (B) | (United Kingdom) Noah Baglin | KR | IAME | (United Kingdom) Noah Baglin |
| (Spain) Valencia | OK-J | (Belgium) Antoine Sylva Venant | (United Kingdom) Will Green | (United Kingdom) Will Green (A) | (Spain) Daniel Mirón | KR | IAME | (Belgium) Antoine Sylva Venant |
| (Spain) Valencia | OK-J | (Belgium) Antoine Sylva Venant | (United Kingdom) Will Green | (France) Many Nuvolini (B) | (Spain) Daniel Mirón | KR | IAME | (Belgium) Antoine Sylva Venant |
| (Belgium) Genk | KZ | (Italy) Danilo Albanese | (Sweden) Viktor Gustavsson | (Netherlands) Stan Pex | (Spain) Adrián Malheiro | CRG | TM | (Romania) Daniel Vasile |
| (Belgium) Genk | KZ2 | (France) Arthur Lehouck | (France) Téo Blin | (Brazil) Matheus Morgatto (A) | (Belgium) Elie Goldstein | TB | TM | (Spain) Daniel Maciá |
| (Belgium) Genk | KZ2 | (France) Arthur Lehouck | (France) Téo Blin | (France) Arthur Lehouck (B) | (Belgium) Elie Goldstein | TB | TM | (Spain) Daniel Maciá |
| (Germany) Mülsen | OK | (Australia) William Calleja | (Australia) William Calleja | (Ukraine) Lev Krutogolov (A) | (United Kingdom) Zac Drummond | KR | IAME | (Belgium) Matthias Vandekerckhove |
| (Germany) Mülsen | OK | (Australia) William Calleja | (Australia) William Calleja | (United Kingdom) Zac Drummond (B) | (United Kingdom) Zac Drummond | KR | IAME | (Belgium) Matthias Vandekerckhove |
| (Germany) Mülsen | OK-J | (Poland) Remigiusz Samczyk | (United Kingdom) Will Green | (United Kingdom) Will Green (A) | (United Kingdom) Will Green | KR | IAME | (Spain) Daniel Mirón |
| (Germany) Mülsen | OK-J | (Poland) Remigiusz Samczyk | (United Kingdom) Will Green | (Spain) Daniel Mirón (B) | (United Kingdom) Will Green | KR | IAME | (Spain) Daniel Mirón |
| (Italy) Sarno | KZ | (France) Émilien Denner | (Sweden) Viktor Gustavsson | (France) Émilien Denner | (France) Émilien Denner | IPK | TM | (France) Émilien Denner |
| (Italy) Sarno | KZ2 | (Germany) Maximilian Schleimer | (Finland) Kimi Tani | (Finland) Kimi Tani (A) | (Finland) Kimi Tani | Parolin | TM | (Brazil) Matheus Morgatto |
| (Italy) Sarno | KZ2 | (Germany) Maximilian Schleimer | (Finland) Kimi Tani | (Germany) Maximilian Schleimer (B) | (Finland) Kimi Tani | Parolin | TM | (Brazil) Matheus Morgatto |
| (Poland) Słomczyn | A&D-S | (Poland) Kacper Turoboyski (Note: Pole position determined by sprints.) | (Poland) Kacper Turoboyski | | (Poland) Kacper Turoboyski | Kosmic | Vortex | (Poland) Adrian Potępa |
| (Poland) Słomczyn | A&D-J | (Poland) Błażej Kostrzewa | (Poland) Błażej Kostrzewa | | (Poland) Maksymilian Piątek | Kosmic | Vortex | (Lithuania) Vydūnas Piktys |
| (Sweden) Kristianstad | OK | (Switzerland) Dan Allemann | (Australia) William Calleja | (Australia) William Calleja (A) | (Australia) William Calleja | Parolin | TM | (Australia) William Calleja |
| (Sweden) Kristianstad | OK | (Switzerland) Dan Allemann | (Australia) William Calleja | (United Kingdom) Henry Domain (B) | (Australia) William Calleja | Parolin | TM | (Australia) William Calleja |
| (Sweden) Kristianstad | OK-J | (Spain) Daniel Mirón | (France) Stan Ratajski | (Belgium) Priam Bruno (A) | (United Kingdom) Emerson MacAndrew-Uren | Tony Kart | Vortex | (Italy) Gioele Girardello |
| (Sweden) Kristianstad | OK-J | (Spain) Daniel Mirón | (France) Stan Ratajski | (Georgia (country)) Leon Chelidze (B) | (United Kingdom) Emerson MacAndrew-Uren | Tony Kart | Vortex | (Italy) Gioele Girardello |

=== Scoring system ===
The points system was altered to apply super heat points for the results of each super heat held, as opposed to the final intermediate classification, effectively doubling the points on offer for rounds with two super heats. Points were awarded to the top-15 drivers in each classification and the fastest lap holder in the final, as follows:

Scoring system
| Position | 1st | 2nd | 3rd | 4th | 5th | 6th | 7th | 8th | 9th | 10th | 11th | 12th | 13th | 14th | 15th | FL |
|---|---|---|---|---|---|---|---|---|---|---|---|---|---|---|---|---|
| QH | 25 | 22 | 19 | 17 | 15 | 13 | 11 | 9 | 7 | 6 | 5 | 4 | 3 | 2 | 1 | 0 |
| SH | 25 | 22 | 19 | 17 | 15 | 13 | 11 | 9 | 7 | 6 | 5 | 4 | 3 | 2 | 1 | 0 |
| F | 50 | 44 | 38 | 34 | 30 | 26 | 22 | 18 | 14 | 10 | 8 | 6 | 4 | 2 | 1 | 1 |

==== Results key ====
| Colour | Result |
|---|---|
| Gold | Winner |
| Silver | Second place |
| Bronze | Third place |
| Green | Top-10 points finish |
| Sky blue | Other points finish |
| Blue | Non-points finish |
| Blue | Non-classified finish (NC) |
| Purple | Retired (Ret) |
| Red | Did not qualify (DNQ) |
| Red | Did not pre-qualify (DNPQ) |
| Black | Disqualified (DSQ) |
| White | Did not start (DNS) |
| White | Withdrew (WD) |
| White | Race cancelled (C) |
| Blank | Did not practice (DNP) |
| Blank | Did not arrive (DNA) |
| Blank | Excluded (EX) |

| Symbol | Meaning |
|---|---|
| P | Pole position |
| F | Fastest lap |
| † | Did not finish, but was classified. |

=== Standings, OK ===
The finalists in the OK class:

2026 CIK-FIA European Championship OK standings
| Pos | Driver | LAC (Italy) | | | | VAL (Spain) | | | | MÜL (Germany) | | | | KRI (Sweden) | | | | Points |
| Pos | Driver | QH | SA | SB | F | QH | SA | SB | F | QH | SA | SB | F | QH | SA | SB | F | Points |
|---|---|---|---|---|---|---|---|---|---|---|---|---|---|---|---|---|---|---|
| 1 | (United Kingdom) Noah Baglin | 1 | 1^{P}^{F} | | 1^{P} | 5^{P} | 2^{F} | | 1^{F} | 23 | 3 | | 7 | 3 | 2 | | 2 | 316 |
| 2 | (United Kingdom) Zac Drummond | 16 | | 7 | 3 | 9 | 3 | | 4 | 2 | | 1^{P} | 1^{P} | 43 | 6 | | DSQ | 223 |
| 3 | (Netherlands) Dean Hoogendoorn | 4 | | 3 | 4 | 28 | | 9 | 9 | 3 | 15 | | 4 | 8 | | 2 | 3 | 221 |
| 4 | (Australia) William Calleja | 10 | | 4 | 8 | 7 | 9 | | 20 | 1^{P} | 4^{P} | | 24† | 1 | 1^{P}^{F} | | 1^{P}^{F} | 206 |
| 5 | (Austria) Niklas Schaufler | 21 | 11 | | 32† | 1 | 1^{P} | | 3^{P} | 5 | 2 | | 5 | 40 | | 14 | 13 | 166 |
| 6 | (United Kingdom) Henry Domain | 2 | | 10^{P} | 11 | 11 | 5 | | 32† | 9 | 8^{F} | | Ret | 2 | | 1^{P} | 5 | 152 |
| 7 | (Ukraine) Lev Krutogolov | 27 | 4 | | 6 | 21 | 11 | | 35† | 13 | 1 | | 8 | 24 | | 8 | 7 | 126 |
| 8 | (Spain) Benjamin Mañach | 5 | 5 | | 31† | 8 | | 4 | 8 | 39 | 34† | | DNQ | 19 | 13 | | 8 | 103 |
| 9 | (Sweden) Oliver Kinnmark | 17 | 7 | | 10 | 25 | 13 | | 29 | 8 | | 2 | 2 | 29 | 21 | | 18 | 100 |
| 10 | (Germany) Luke Kornder | 8 | | 1 | 2 | 52 | | 19 | DNQ | 6 | | 12 | 27† | 62 | | DSQ | DNQ | 95 |

Standings from 11th onwards
| 11 | (United States) Devin Walz | 39 | 13 | | 25 | 10 | | 5 | 10 | 10 | | 3 | 6 | WD | WD | WD | WD | 90 |
| 12 | (United Kingdom) Joe Turney | WD | WD | WD | WD | 2 | | 2^{P} | 2 | WD | WD | WD | WD | 33 | 31† | | DNQ | 88 |
| 13 | (Belgium) Gilles Herman | 3 | 2 | | 5 | 45 | 32† | | DNQ | 14 | | 6 | 23 | 27 | 27† | | 23 | 86 |
| 14 | (Italy) Davide Bottaro | 29 | 14 | | Ret | 4 | | 3 | 14 | 37 | 10 | | 28† | 10 | | 3 | Ret | 76 |
| 15 | (Canada) Ilie Tristan Crisan | 55 | 21 | | DNQ | 39 | DNS | | DNQ | 18 | | 10 | Ret | 5 | 3 | | 4 | 74 |
| 16 | (Portugal) Gustavo Marques da Silva | 69 | 30† | | DNQ | 81 | DNQ | | DNPQ | 22 | | 4 | 19 | 6 | | 4 | 6 | 73 |
| 17 | (Switzerland) Dan Allemann | 6 | | 13 | 23 | 6 | | 1^{F} | 15 | 46 | | 17 | DNQ | 11^{P} | 20 | | 16 | 66 |
| 18 | (Italy) Valerio Viapiana | 30 | | Ret | DNQ | 51 | 14 | | DNQ | 32 | | 7 | 3 | 34 | | 13 | 11 | 63 |
| 19 | (Spain) Bosco Arias | 18 | | 2 | 30† | 18 | | 25 | 12 | 11 | 6 | | Ret | 18 | | 5 | Ret | 63 |
| 20 | (United Kingdom) Zac Green | 20 | | 24 | Ret | 20 | | Ret | 31† | 7 | 7 | | 9 | 14 | | 11 | 10 | 54 |
| 21 | (Spain) Manuel Míguez | 24 | | 11 | 17 | 17 | 8 | | 6 | 44 | | 33† | DNQ | 37 | 11 | | 17 | 53 |
| 22 | (Denmark) Marco Garst | 14 | | 6 | 19 | 30 | | 16 | 23 | 12 | | 8 | 15 | 9 | 8 | | 28† | 49 |
| 23 | (Australia) James Anagnostiadis | 15 | 3 | | 7 | 27 | 18 | | 30 | WD | WD | WD | WD | WD | WD | WD | WD | 42 |
| 24 | (Poland) Tomasz Cichoracki | 59 | 19 | | DNQ | 26 | | 7 | 7 | 40 | | 34† | DNQ | WD | WD | WD | WD | 37 |
| 25 | (Mexico) Emiliano Hernández | 22 | | 5 | 21 | 63 | 31† | | DNQ | WD | WD | WD | WD | 15 | 5 | | 15 | 36 |
| 26 | (United Kingdom) Evan Purcell | 11 | 6 | | 13 | 40 | | 17 | 25 | 62 | | 21^{F} | DNQ | 17 | 7 | | Ret | 35 |
| 27 | (Monaco) Andréa Manni | 7 | 8 | | 9 | WD | WD | WD | WD | WD | WD | WD | WD | WD | WD | WD | WD | 34 |
| 28 | Vladimir Ivannikov | 50 | | 20 | DNQ | 23 | 7 | | 11 | 20 | | 11 | 14 | 44 | | 12 | DNQ | 34 |
| 29 | (France) Thomas Pradier | 12 | | 8 | 15 | 44 | | 6 | 34† | WD | WD | WD | WD | 23 | 12 | | 19 | 33 |
| 30 | (Poland) Klara Kowalczyk | 23 | 12 | | 12 | 32 | | Ret | DNQ | 16 | | 5 | 25† | 47 | 14 | | DNQ | 30 |
| 31 | (Italy) Bruno Blanco | 68 | | 17 | DNQ | 53 | 28 | | DNQ | 55 | 22 | | DNQ | 22 | | 7 | 9 | 25 |
| 32 | (Italy) Nicolò Cuman | 28 | | 19 | 33† | 16 | | Ret | 26 | WD | WD | WD | WD | 4 | | 9 | 26† | 25 |
| 33 | (United States) Asher Ochstein | 26 | | 15 | 29 | 14 | | Ret | 16 | 4 | | 18 | 16 | 36 | | 16 | 22 | 22 |
| 34 | (Czech Republic) Jindřich Pešl | 38 | | 12 | 18 | 33 | 10 | | 19 | 30 | | 9 | 17 | 39 | 16 | | DNQ | 21 |
| 35 | (United Kingdom) Sebastian Minns | 60 | | 22 | DNQ | 13 | 6 | | DSQ | 17 | 16 | | DSQ | WD | WD | WD | WD | 20 |
| 36 | (Belgium) Matthias Vandekerckhove | 40 | | Ret | DNQ | 19 | 23 | | 21 | 19 | 9 | | 10^{F} | 42 | | 15 | DNQ | 19 |
| 37 | (Italy) Egon Pedrotti | 33 | 18 | | 22 | 72 | | 11 | DNQ | 57 | 31 | | DNQ | 16 | | 6 | 21 | 19 |
| 38 | (Turkey) İskender Zülfikari | 36^{P} | | 9^{F} | 20 | 12 | | 10 | 27 | WD | WD | WD | WD | WD | WD | WD | WD | 18 |
| 39 | (Japan) Arata Endo | 48 | | 14 | DNQ | 60 | | Ret | DNQ | 21 | 5 | | 22 | 50 | | 18 | DNQ | 17 |
| 40 | (United Kingdom) Aston Sharp | 46 | | 28 | DNQ | 64 | | 14 | DNQ | 49 | 29 | | DNQ | 13 | 9 | | 27† | 15 |
| 41 | (Italy) Filippo Sala | 13 | 9 | | 16^{F} | 24 | | Ret | 17 | 36 | | 32† | DNQ | 21 | 19 | | Ret | 13 |
| 42 | (United States) Michael McGaughy | 47 | 15 | | DNQ | 35 | 17 | | 18 | 31 | 13 | | Ret | 20 | | 35† | 12 | 12 |
| 43 | (United States) Drew Walz | 51 | 32† | | DNQ | 29 | 20 | | 28 | 29 | 14 | | 11 | WD | WD | WD | WD | 11 |
| 44 | (France) Gabriel Canal | 37 | DSQ | | DNQ | 38 | | 22 | DNQ | 61 | 20 | | DNQ | 12 | | 10^{F} | 20 | 11 |
| 45 | (France) Clovis Nougueyrede | 34 | | 16 | 14 | 15 | 22 | | 13 | WD | WD | WD | WD | WD | WD | WD | WD | 10 |
| 46 | (Poland) Kacper Rajpold | 19 | 10 | | 28 | 58 | | 12 | DNQ | 26 | | Ret | DSQ | 26 | | 19 | 25 | 10 |
| 47 | (Peru) Mariano López | 9 | 27† | | DSQ | 46 | | 21 | DNQ | 24 | | 13 | Ret | 67 | 30† | | DNQ | 10 |
| 48 | (Malaysia) Zarief Rayqal | 49 | 17 | | DNQ | 62 | | 8 | DNQ | 43 | 23 | | DNQ | 66 | | 33† | DNQ | 9 |
| 49 | (South Africa) William Marshall | 56 | | 26 | DNQ | 31 | 15 | | 24 | 25 | 12 | | Ret | 28 | | 29 | 24 | 7 |
| 50 | (Singapore) Isaac Seah | 66 | | 18 | DNQ | 36 | | Ret | DNQ | 33 | 18 | | 12 | WD | WD | WD | WD | 6 |
| 51 | (Italy) Ludovico Mazzola | 52 | | 25 | DNQ | 37 | 12 | | 22 | 35 | 21 | | 21 | 56 | | 27 | DNQ | 5 |
| 52 | (Netherlands) Luuk Taal | DSQ | DNQ | | DNPQ | 47 | 33† | | DNQ | 27 | 24 | | 13 | 38 | | 22 | DNQ | 4 |
| 53 | (Panama) Gianmatteo Rousseau | 42 | | Ret | DNQ | 50 | | 13 | DNQ | WD | WD | WD | WD | WD | WD | WD | WD | 3 |
| 54 | (Czech Republic) Jakub Kameník | WD | WD | WD | WD | WD | WD | WD | WD | 28 | | 14 | 18 | 49 | 33† | | DNQ | 2 |
| 55 | (Poland) Wiktor Stalmach | 57 | 31† | | DNQ | 68 | | 15 | DNQ | 34 | | 16 | 20 | 52 | | 23 | DNQ | 2 |
| 56 | (Italy) Pietro Bagutti | 35 | 16 | | 24 | 41 | 19 | | DNQ | WD | WD | WD | WD | WD | WD | WD | WD | 0 |
| 57 | (Czech Republic) Tobias Szécsényi | 25 | 33† | | 27 | WD | WD | WD | WD | WD | WD | WD | WD | WD | WD | WD | WD | 0 |
| 58 | (Switzerland) Nicola Frigg | 45 | 20 | | DNQ | 59 | 25 | | DNQ | 54 | | 25 | DNQ | 31 | 26† | | 29† | 0 |
| 59 | (Denmark) Mika Rünitz | 76 | | DNQ | DNPQ | WD | WD | WD | WD | 41 | 17 | | DNQ | 32 | | 17 | DSQ | 0 |
Wild card drivers ineligible for championship points
| — | (Spain) Aaron García | | | | | 3 | 4 | | 5 | | | | | | | | | — |
| — | (Indonesia) Oliveri Sini | | | | | | | | | | | | | 25 | 10 | | 14 | — |
| — | (Sweden) Viktor Gustavsson | | | | | 22 | | 24 | 33† | 15 | 11 | | 26† | | | | | — |
| — | (Italy) Luigi Coluccio | 31 | 23 | | 26 | | | | | | | | | | | | | — |
| — | (Italy) Giacomo Giusto | | | | | | | | | | | | | 7 | 4 | | Ret | — |
| — | (Italy) Huifei Xie | | | | | | | | | | | | | 41 | 15 | | DNQ | — |
| — | (Kyrgyzstan) Mark Pilipenko | | | | | | | | | 48 | | 15 | DNQ | | | | | — |
| — | (Spain) Daniel Maciá | | | | | 43 | 16 | | DNQ | | | | | | | | | — |
| — | (Sweden) Melker Milell | | | | | | | | | 77 | DNQ | | DNPQ | 63 | 17 | | DNQ | — |
| — | (Czech Republic) Tereza Bábíčková | | | | | | | | | | | | | 53 | 18 | | DNQ | — |
| Pos | Driver | QH | SA | SB | F | QH | SA | SB | F | QH | SA | SB | F | QH | SA | SB | F | Points |
| Pos | Driver | LAC (Italy) | | | | VAL (Spain) | | | | MÜL (Germany) | | | | KRI (Sweden) | | | | Points |

=== Standings, OK-Junior ===
The finalists in the OK-J class:

2026 CIK-FIA European Championship OK-J standings
| Pos | Driver | LAC (Italy) | | | | VAL (Spain) | | | | MÜL (Germany) | | | | KRI (Sweden) | | | | Points |
| Pos | Driver | QH | SA | SB | F | QH | SA | SB | F | QH | SA | SB | F | QH | SA | SB | F | Points |
|---|---|---|---|---|---|---|---|---|---|---|---|---|---|---|---|---|---|---|
| 1 | (United Kingdom) Will Green | 2 | | 2^{P} | 1 | 1 | 1^{P}^{F} | | 3^{P} | 1 | 1^{P}^{F} | | 1^{P} | 16 | | 4 | 12 | 305 |
| 2 | (Spain) Daniel Mirón | 1 | 1^{P}^{F} | | DSQ^{P} | 5 | 2 | | 1 | 8 | | 1 | 4^{F} | 2^{P} | | 14^{P}^{F} | 22 | 234 |
| 3 | (France) Many Nuvolini | 4 | | 29† | 6 | 4 | | 1 | 2 | 9 | 4 | | 5 | 10 | | 5 | 23 | 208 |
| 4 | (Italy) Gioele Girardello | 6 | | 3 | 2^{F} | 3 | 3 | | 4 | 15 | 11 | | 23 | 3 | 13 | | 19^{F} | 181 |
| 5 | (Belgium) Priam Bruno | 3^{P} | 5 | | 3 | 71 | 12 | | DNQ | 3 | 2 | | 16 | 11 | 1 | | 16 | 149 |
| 6 | (Finland) Oskari Walle | 7 | 6 | | 7 | 2 | | 2^{P} | 10 | 22 | | 9 | 32† | 8 | | 3 | Ret | 135 |
| 7 | (Czech Republic) Zdeněk Bábíček | 14 | | 1 | 5 | 34 | | 12 | 30 | 14 | | 2 | 3 | 28 | | 8 | DSQ | 134 |
| 8 | (Italy) Julian Frasnelli | 8 | | 4 | 4 | 6 | | 8 | 15 | 27 | 9 | | 19 | 39 | 11 | | 4 | 131 |
| 9 | (Italy) Antônio Pizzonia Neto | 46 | | 6 | 32† | 17 | 4 | | 7 | 10 | | 7 | 2 | 46 | | 28 | DNQ | 116 |
| 10 | (United Kingdom) Emerson MacAndrew-Uren | 13 | 13 | | 10 | 19 | 13 | | 16 | 36 | | 10 | 30† | 4 | | 2 | 1 | 114 |

Standings from 11th onwards
| 11 | (United Kingdom) Jarlath Sayer | 19 | 27 | | 26 | 13 | 5 | | 5 | 11 | 6 | | 12 | 44 | | 9 | 9 | 99 |
| 12 | (France) Zack Zhu | 36 | | 13 | 27 | 11 | 14 | | 28 | 25 | 3 | | 17 | 7 | 3^{F} | | 3 | 97 |
| 13 | (Slovakia) Alex Molota | 39 | 33† | | DNQ | 15 | 8 | | 9 | 4 | | 4 | 7 | 35 | 12 | | 10 | 94 |
| 14 | (Georgia (country)) Leon Chelidze | 64 | | 14 | DNQ | 81 | DNQ | | DNPQ | 47 | 19 | | DNQ | 6 | | 1 | 2 | 84 |
| 15 | (Italy) Lorenzo Di Pietrantonio | 65 | 23 | | DNQ | 14 | | 3 | 6 | 34 | | 14 | 11 | 23 | 4 | | 27† | 76 |
| 16 | (United States) Lucas Palacio | 74 | | DNQ | DNPQ | 12 | | 5 | 20 | 21 | 15 | | 6 | 5 | 9 | | 15 | 72 |
| 17 | (Argentina) Martín Bertolaccini | 5 | 3 | | 9 | 45 | 19 | | DNQ | 13 | 16 | | 24 | 30 | | 10 | 26† | 61 |
| 18 | (United Kingdom) Mason Robertson | 52 | | Ret | DNQ | 56 | | 16 | DNQ | 18 | | 11 | 29† | 9 | 7 | | 5 | 54 |
| 19 | (Poland) Remigiusz Samczyk | 18 | | 5 | 28 | 10 | | 14 | 14 | 6^{P} | | 6 | 28† | 36 | | 25 | DNQ | 53 |
| 20 | (France) Stan Ratajski | 30 | | 12 | 31† | 41 | 23 | | DNQ | 44 | | Ret | DNQ | 1 | 2^{P} | | 25†^{P} | 51 |
| 21 | (Italy) Antonio Ianni | 11 | 2 | | 8 | 46 | | 34† | DNQ | 84 | | DNQ | DNPQ | 66 | | Ret | DNQ | 45 |
| 22 | (Mexico) Santiago Díaz | 25 | 30† | | 16 | 74 | | DNQ | DNPQ | 2 | | 3^{P} | 21 | 50 | | Ret | DNQ | 42 |
| 23 | (United Kingdom) Harry Williams | 12 | | 9 | 13 | 61 | 20 | | DNQ | 17 | Ret | | 14 | 14 | | 6 | 17 | 36 |
| 24 | (Ukraine) Vsevolod Osadchyi-Suslovskyi | 22 | | Ret | 30† | 29 | 17 | | 19 | 12 | | 5 | 10 | 37 | 24 | | DNQ | 35 |
| 25 | (Poland) Leo Górski | 27 | 7 | | 12 | 22 | | 4^{F} | 17 | WD | WD | WD | WD | WD | WD | WD | WD | 34 |
| 26 | (United Arab Emirates) Ava Lawrence | 59 | 16 | | DNQ | 55 | 22 | | DNQ | 82 | | DNQ | DNPQ | 26 | | 7 | 7 | 33 |
| 27 | (Indonesia) Oliveri Sini | 35 | 9 | | 23 | 25 | 6 | | 11 | 23 | 12 | | 33† | | | | | 33 |
| 28 | (Belgium) Henri-Constant Kumpen | 47 | 34† | | DNQ | 26 | | 13 | 21 | 41 | 25 | | DNQ | 21 | 8 | | 8 | 30 |
| 29 | (Switzerland) Albert Tamm | 29 | 22 | | 33† | 8 | | 6 | 18 | 77 | DNQ | | DNPQ | 25 | 10 | | Ret | 28 |
| 30 | (Mexico) Miguel Manzano | 58 | | 19 | DNQ | 28 | | 22 | 35† | 72 | | 27 | DNQ | 31 | 16 | | 6 | 26 |
| 31 | (United Arab Emirates) Maxim Bobreshov | 37 | 17 | | DNQ | 9 | 7 | | 12 | 42 | | 16 | 25† | 51 | 31 | | DNQ | 25 |
| 32 | Matvey Dergunov | 33 | 12 | | 17 | 75 | DNQ | | DNPQ | 24 | | 13^{F} | DSQ | 13 | 5 | | Ret | 25 |
| 33 | (Italy) Giacomo Giusto | 20 | | 25 | 11 | 16 | | 9 | 13 | WD | WD | WD | WD | | | | | 19 |
| 34 | (Greece) Jason Kosmopoulos | 38 | | 10^{F} | DSQ | 36 | | 10 | 26 | 37 | 14 | | 15 | 55 | 17 | | DNQ | 18 |
| 35 | (France) Jean Poujol | 21 | 4 | | 22 | 72 | | 33† | DNQ | 61 | 20 | | DNQ | 47 | 27 | | DNQ | 17 |
| 36 | (United States) Liam Nachawati | 9 | 8 | | 25 | 69 | 31† | | DNQ | 58 | | 20 | DNQ | 71 | 30 | | DNQ | 16 |
| 37 | (Brazil) Felipe Sanches | 42 | | 21 | DNQ | 30 | | 17 | 32 | 19 | 17 | | 13 | 29 | 18 | | 11 | 15 |
| 38 | (Mexico) Juan Garciarce | 23 | 26 | | 18 | 33 | 15 | | 34† | 29 | 7 | | 26† | WD | WD | WD | WD | 14 |
| 39 | (Italy) Alexander Lazarus | 55 | 18 | | DNQ | 38 | | 15 | 24 | 45 | 33 | | DNQ | 19 | 6 | | Ret | 14 |
| 40 | (United States) Alessandro Truchot | 32 | | 11 | 29 | 20 | | 11 | 33 | 32 | | 12 | 34† | 38 | | 30 | DNQ | 14 |
| 41 | (Lithuania) Jonas Pundys | 51 | 21 | | DNQ | 88 | | DNQ | DNPQ | 33 | 8 | | 20 | 49 | 15 | | DNQ | 12 |
| 42 | (Belgium) Mohamed El Bouzakhi | 44 | | 24 | DNQ | 18 | | 7 | 23 | 64 | | 17 | DNQ | WD | WD | WD | WD | 11 |
| 43 | (Italy) Max Felde | 15 | 10 | | 24 | 48 | | 27 | DNQ | 43 | 18 | | DNQ | 17 | 14 | | Ret | 9 |
| 44 | (Finland) Oiva Vettenranta | 34 | | 8 | DSQ | 42 | | 20 | DNQ | 35 | 31 | | DNQ | 69 | 34† | | DNQ | 9 |
| 45 | (Malta) Benjamin Westwood | 84 | | DNQ | DNPQ | 23 | 9 | | DSQ | 78 | | DNQ | DNPQ | WD | WD | WD | WD | 7 |
| 46 | (Spain) Nuvola Morales Mendez | 87 | DNQ | | DNPQ | 51 | 30† | | DNQ | 65 | 10 | | DNQ | 65 | 32 | | DNQ | 7 |
| 47 | (Italy) Huifei Xie | 17 | 11 | | 21 | 49 | 29† | | DNQ | 48 | | Ret | DNQ | | | | | 5 |
| 48 | (Kyrgyzstan) Mark Pilipenko | 60 | | 22 | DNQ | 21 | 11 | | 22 | | | | | | | | | 5 |
| 49 | (Portugal) Xavier Lázaro | 40 | | 20 | DNQ | 43 | 28† | | DNQ | 62 | | 31† | DNQ | 20 | | 11 | Ret | 5 |
| 50 | (Italy) Oleksandr Legenkyi | 71 | 14 | | DNQ | 39 | Ret | | DNQ | 57 | 27 | | DNQ | 64 | | 13 | DNQ | 5 |
| 51 | Stepan Mazepin | 62 | | 26 | DNQ | 31 | DSQ | | DNQ | 68 | | 22 | DNQ | 32 | | 19 | 14 | 4 |
| 52 | (Italy) Michele Orlando | 48 | | 15 | DNQ | 37 | 16 | | 29 | 59 | 28 | | DNQ | WD | WD | WD | WD | 1 |
| 53 | (United Kingdom) Austin Newstead | 53 | 28 | | DNQ | 44 | | Ret | DNQ | 50 | | 30† | DNQ | 15 | 20 | | Ret | 1 |
| 54 | (Andorra) Tony Cachafeiro | 63 | 15 | | DNQ | 47 | 26 | | DNQ | WD | WD | WD | WD | WD | WD | WD | WD | 1 |
| 55 | (Monaco) Augustin Feligioni | 31 | 35† | | DNQ | 57 | DSQ | | DNQ | 69 | 30 | | DNQ | 52 | | 15 | DNQ | 1 |
| 56 | (France) Marc'Andria Quessada | 45 | 36† | | DNQ | WD | WD | WD | WD | WD | WD | WD | WD | 34 | | 20 | 18 | 0 |
| 57 | (France) Téo Pelfrene | 24 | | 23 | 19 | 24 | | 18 | 31 | 30 | | DSQ | DNQ | 24 | | 27 | 21 | 0 |
| 58 | (Brazil) Guilherme Busato | 73 | DNQ | | DNPQ | 79 | DNQ | | DNPQ | 31 | 26 | | DNQ | 22 | | 16 | 20 | 0 |
| 59 | (Norway) Kristian-Aleksander Røst | 26 | | 17 | 20 | 62 | | 35† | DNQ | 52 | | Ret | DNQ | | | | | 0 |
| 60 | (Kyrgyzstan) Marat Zvarich | 56 | | 30† | DNQ | 80 | | DNQ | DNPQ | 26 | | 29† | 22 | 41 | 33† | | DNQ | 0 |
| 61 | (Canada) Rocco Simone | 54 | | Ret | DNQ | 63 | 24 | | DNQ | 53 | 23 | | DNQ | 18 | | 17 | 24† | 0 |
| 62 | (Finland) Lenni Mäkinen | 28 | | 27 | DNQ | 27 | 18 | | 27 | 38 | | 19 | 27† | 33 | Ret | | DNQ | 0 |
| 63 | (Australia) Jay Kostecki | 41 | 32† | | DNQ | 32 | | 19 | 25 | WD | WD | WD | WD | WD | WD | WD | WD | 0 |
| DQ | (Belgium) Antoine Sylva Venant | 10 | | 7 | 15 | 7^{P} | 10 | | 8^{F} | 20 | | 8 | 8 | 12 | | 12 | DSQ | 90 (Note: Antoine Sylva Venant scored 90 points, but was excluded from the championship for ignoring a mechanical flag and colliding with Gioele Girardello at Kristianstad; he retained his results achieved throughout the season.) |
Wild card drivers ineligible for championship points
| — | (Italy) Niccolò Perico | 16 | | Ret | 14 | | | | | 5 | 5 | | 9 | | | | | — |
| — | (United States) Troy Ferguson | | | | | 35 | Ret | | DNQ | | | | | 27 | 28 | | 13 | — |
| — | (Germany) Henri Möhring | | | | | | | | | 7 | 13 | | 18 | | | | | — |
| — | (Ecuador) Julian Rivera | | | | | | | | | 16 | | 15 | 31† | | | | | — |
| Pos | Driver | QH | SA | SB | F | QH | SA | SB | F | QH | SA | SB | F | QH | SA | SB | F | Points |
| Pos | Driver | LAC (Italy) | | | | VAL (Spain) | | | | MÜL (Germany) | | | | KRI (Sweden) | | | | Points |

=== Standings, KZ ===
The finalists in the KZ class:

2026 CIK-FIA European Championship KZ standings
| Pos | Driver | GEN (Belgium) | | | SAR (Italy) | | | Points |
| Pos | Driver | QH | SH | F | QH | SH | F | Points |
|---|---|---|---|---|---|---|---|---|
| 1 | (France) Émilien Denner | 14 | 13 | 5 | 2^{P} | 1 | 1^{P}^{F} | 133 |
| 2 | (Italy) Danilo Albanese | 2^{P} | 2 | 3 | 3 | 13 | 8 | 122 |
| 3 | (Sweden) Viktor Gustavsson | 1 | 3^{P}^{F} | 20†^{P} | 1 | 2^{P} | 5 | 121 |
| 4 | (Netherlands) Stan Pex | 3 | 1 | 2 | 12 | 11 | 12 | 103 |
| 5 | (Romania) Daniel Vasile | 18 | 7 | 4^{F} | 6 | 9 | 6 | 92 |
| 6 | (Spain) Adrián Malheiro | 4 | 4 | 1 | 18 | 15 | 13 | 90 |
| 7 | (Italy) Giuseppe Palomba | 13 | DSQ | 6 | 9 | 5^{F} | 3 | 89 |
| 8 | (France) Mattéo Spirgel | 9 | 19 | 15 | 5 | 3 | 2 | 86 |
| 9 | (France) Jean Nomblot | 21 | 18 | 10 | 7 | 4 | 4 | 72 |
| 10 | (France) Tom Leuillet | 12 | 9 | 8 | 8 | 7 | 7 | 71 |

Standings from 11th onwards
| 11 | (Italy) Lorenzo Travisanutto | 8 | 8 | 12 | 4 | 6 | 9 | 68 |
| 12 | Maksim Orlov | 6 | 11 | 7 | 11 | 8 | 18† | 54 |
| 13 | (Italy) Lorenzo Camplese | 11 | 6 | 13 | 10 | 10 | 10 | 44 |
| 14 | (Spain) Pedro Hiltbrand | 5 | 5 | 23† | 19 | 12 | 19† | 34 |
| 15 | (Italy) Alessio Piccini | 10 | 10 | 14 | 14 | 16 | 20† | 17 |
| 16 | (Netherlands) Marijn Kremers | 7 | 23† | 21† | 13 | Ret | 15 | 16 |
| 17 | (Netherlands) Jorrit Pex | 22 | 15 | 9 | | | | 15 |
| 18 | (Estonia) Markus Kajak | 16 | 22† | 17 | 15 | 17 | 11 | 9 |
| 19 | (Netherlands) Senna van Walstijn | 20 | 20† | 11 | | | | 8 |
| 20 | (Italy) Matteo Viganò | 23 | 12 | 24† | 21 | 18 | 17 | 4 |
| 21 | (Italy) Cristian Bertuca | 19 | 14 | 22† | | | | 2 |
| 22 | (France) Enzo Lacreuse | 24 | 17 | 19 | 17 | Ret | 16 | 1 |
| 23 | (Poland) David Liwiński | 15 | 16 | 16 | | | | 1 |
| 24 | (Germany) David Trefilov | 17 | 21† | 18 | | | | 0 |
| 25 | (Italy) Mathias Torreggiani | | | | 20 | 19 | 21† | 0 |
Wild card drivers ineligible for championship points
| — | (Italy) Alex Maragliano | | | | 16 | 14 | 14 | — |
| Pos | Driver | QH | SH | F | QH | SH | F | Points |
| Pos | Driver | GEN (Belgium) | | | SAR (Italy) | | | Points |

=== Standings, KZ2 ===
The finalists in the KZ2 class:

2026 CIK-FIA European Championship KZ2 standings
| Pos | Driver | GEN (Belgium) | | | | SAR (Italy) | | | | Points |
| Pos | Driver | QH | SA | SB | F | QH | SA | SB | F | Points |
|---|---|---|---|---|---|---|---|---|---|---|
| 1 | (Finland) Kimi Tani | 10 | | 4 | 3 | 1 | 1^{P} | | 1^{P} | 161 |
| 2 | (Brazil) Matheus Morgatto | 9 | 1 | | 2 | 7 | 2^{F} | | 3^{F} | 148 |
| 3 | (Germany) Maximilian Schleimer | 3 | 2 | | 6 | 6^{P} | | 1 | 5 | 135 |
| 4 | (Spain) Genís Cívico | 13 | 3 | | 7 | 3 | 4 | | 2 | 124 |
| 5 | (Belgium) Elie Goldstein | 4 | | 6 | 1 | 12 | | 25† | 9 | 98 |
| 6 | (Spain) Daniel Maciá | 15 | 6 | | 4^{F} | 15 | 5 | | 8 | 83 |
| 7 | (France) Arthur Lehouck | 2^{P} | | 1^{P}^{F} | 5^{P} | 38 | | 12 | 30 | 81 |
| 8 | (Netherlands) Sem Knopjes | 30 | | 10 | 31† | 10 | | 2 | 4 | 68 |
| 9 | (France) Aloïs Girardet | 8 | | 3 | 11 | 14 | | 3^{F} | 22 | 57 |
| 10 | (United Kingdom) Noah Wolfe | 18 | | 32† | 16 | 9 | 3 | | 6 | 52 |

Standings from 11th onwards
| 11 | (Netherlands) Dion van Werven | 14 | | 7 | 10 | 2 | | 11^{P} | 31† | 50 |
| 12 | (Netherlands) Jayden Thien | 6 | | 2 | 9 | 46 | | DNS | DNQ | 49 |
| 13 | (France) Antoine Broggio | 5 | 9 | | 19 | 20 | | 4 | 14 | 41 |
| 14 | (Czech Republic) Marek Skřivan | 37 | 7 | | 14 | 5 | 6 | | Ret | 41 |
| 15 | (Germany) Robert Kindervater | 11 | 4 | | Ret | 11 | 8 | | 13 | 40 |
| 16 | Yaroslav Shevyrtalov | 31 | 11 | | Ret | 8 | | 16 | 7 | 37 |
| 17 | (Italy) Michael Ider | 7 | Ret | | 25 | 4 | | Ret | 11 | 36 |
| 18 | (Switzerland) Jean Luyet | 26 | | 9 | 8 | 16 | | 17 | 10 | 35 |
| 19 | (New Zealand) Jay Urwin | 28 | | 5 | 18 | 18 | | 7 | 21 | 26 |
| 20 | (France) Téo Blin | 1 | 31†^{P}^{F} | | Ret | 21 | DSQ | | 33† | 25 |
| 21 | (Italy) Filippo Sala | 12 | | 12 | 12 | 19 | 14 | | 12 | 24 |
| 22 | (Netherlands) Tommie van der Struijs | 23 | 5 | | 22 | 32 | | 9 | 23 | 22 |
| 23 | (Denmark) Niklas Vejen | 48 | | 24 | DNQ | 28 | | 5 | 29 | 15 |
| 24 | (Netherlands) Jens Treur | 19 | 10 | | 13 | 13 | 28† | | 24 | 13 |
| 25 | (France) Tom Spirgel | 34 | | 27† | DNQ | 22 | | 6 | 20 | 13 |
| 26 | (Italy) Alessandro Zallocco | 39 | 22 | | DNQ | 17 | 7 | | 16 | 11 |
| 27 | (Australia) James Anagnostiadis | 27 | 8 | | 23 | WD | WD | WD | WD | 9 |
| 28 | (United Kingdom) Jenson Graham | 36 | | 30† | DNQ | 26 | | 8 | 25 | 9 |
| 29 | (Italy) Michael Paparo | 32 | | 8 | Ret | WD | WD | WD | WD | 9 |
| 30 | (Netherlands) Enzo Bol | 16 | | 15 | 24 | 33 | 11 | | 15 | 8 |
| 31 | (France) Hugo Besson | 45 | 20 | | DNQ | 39 | 10 | | 18 | 7 |
| 32 | (Italy) Nicola Rossini | 46 | | 21 | DNQ | 24 | | 10 | 27 | 6 |
| 33 | (Switzerland) Samuel Luyet | 33 | 14 | | 17 | 50 | | 15 | DNQ | 5 |
| 34 | (Latvia) Edgars Vilcāns | 20 | | 31† | 20 | 29 | 12 | | 19 | 5 |
| 35 | Gerasim Skulanov | 38 | | 11 | 27 | 25 | DSQ | | 32† | 5 |
| 36 | (Finland) Alvar Siimesvaara | 40 | | 14 | DNQ | 40 | | 13 | 35† | 5 |
| 37 | (Italy) Andrea Dalè | 29 | 17 | | 15 | 23 | 15 | | 17 | 4 |
| 38 | (Lithuania) Simas Baciuška | 55 | 13 | | DNQ | 31 | Ret | | DNQ | 4 |
| 39 | (Switzerland) Paul Andriotis | 42 | | 13 | DNQ | 57 | 24 | | DNQ | 3 |
| 40 | (Finland) Martti Ritonen | 17 | 15 | | 30† | 30 | | 24† | DNQ | 2 |
| 41 | (Bulgaria) Ilyan Yankov | WD | WD | WD | WD | 47 | 16 | | DNQ | 2 |
| 42 | (France) Corentin Rousseau | 21 | 16 | | 21 | WD | WD | WD | WD | 1 |
| 43 | Radek Vávra | 60 | | 33† | DNQ | 45 | 17 | | DNQ | 1 |
| 44 | (Germany) Manuel Kastl | 25 | 19 | | 26 | 27 | 21 | | 34† | 0 |
| 45 | (Bulgaria) Kaloyan Varbitzaliev | 54 | | 29† | DNQ | 34 | | 20 | 26 | 0 |
| 46 | (China) Houzai Jiang | 22 | | 16 | 28 | 36 | | 27† | DNQ | 0 |
Wild card drivers ineligible for championship points
| — | (Czech Republic) Matěj Preuss | | | | | 35 | 9 | | 28 | — |
| — | (France) Dorian Guldenfels | 24 | | 28† | 29 | | | | | — |
| — | (Netherlands) Kevin Stehouwer | 35 | 12 | | Ret | | | | | — |
| — | (United States) Kyle Wick | | | | | 51 | 13 | | DNQ | — |
| — | (Italy) Andrea Pirovano | | | | | 52 | | 14 | DNQ | — |
| Pos | Driver | QH | SA | SB | F | QH | SA | SB | F | Points |
| Pos | Driver | GEN (Belgium) | | | | SAR (Italy) | | | | Points |

=== Finals, Arrive-and-drive ===
The final for A&D-S was held at Słomczyn on 19 July 2026, at 15:00 local time (UTC+8), and was run for 21 laps; conditions were dry with a surface air temperature of 24 °C (75 °F). The final for A&D-J was held at 14:00 and was run for 17 laps; conditions were dry with a surface air temperature of 24 °C (75 °F). The top-10 results of each arrive-and-drive class:

2026 CIK-FIA Arrive & Drive World Cup top-10 results
| Pos | # | Driver | Chassis | Engine | Tyres | Laps | Time/Retired | Grid |
Senior
| 1 | 11 | (Poland) Kacper Turoboyski | Kosmic | Vortex | V | 21 | 18:15.753 | 1 |
| 2 | 8 | (Poland) Łukasz Jezierski | Kosmic | Vortex | V | 21 | +2.281 | 3 |
| 3 | 10 | (Poland) Adrian Potępa | Kosmic | Vortex | V | 21 | +2.373 | 2 |
| 4 | 18 | (Israel) Yam Pinto | Kosmic | Vortex | V | 21 | +2.617 | 7 |
| 5 | 12 | (Poland) Colin Ważny | Kosmic | Vortex | V | 21 | +2.903 | 5 |
| 6 | 6 | (Sweden) Jonathan Landström | Kosmic | Vortex | V | 21 | +5.157 | 8 |
| 7 | 20 | (Netherlands) Lieke van Boekel | Kosmic | Vortex | V | 21 | +8.321^{1} | 10 |
| 8 | 9 | (Poland) Nikodem Osiecki | Kosmic | Vortex | V | 21 | +9.429^{2} | 11 |
| 9 | 16 | (Croatia) Adriano Kraljić | Kosmic | Vortex | V | 21 | +10.351 | 13 |
| 10 | 3 | (India) Kiaan Shah | Kosmic | Vortex | V | 21 | +10.693 | 17 |
Junior
| 1 | 125 | (Poland) Maksymilian Piątek | Kosmic | Vortex | V | 17 | 14:50.732 | 2 |
| 2 | 108 | (Poland) Błażej Kostrzewa | Kosmic | Vortex | V | 17 | +0.561 | 1 |
| 3 | 118 | (Portugal) Rui Martins | Kosmic | Vortex | V | 17 | +1.090 | 4 |
| 4 | 122 | (United Kingdom) Andie Stewart | Kosmic | Vortex | V | 17 | +2.887 | 3 |
| 5 | 117 | (Lithuania) Vydūnas Piktys | Kosmic | Vortex | V | 17 | +7.985 | 12 |
| 6 | 121 | (Switzerland) Lorenzo Zucchetto | Kosmic | Vortex | V | 17 | +8.586 | 16 |
| 7 | 102 | (Croatia) Vito Ćoza | Kosmic | Vortex | V | 17 | +8.762^{3} | 5 |
| 8 | 107 | (Poland) Stanisław Grabowski | Kosmic | Vortex | V | 17 | +12.911^{4} | 6 |
| 9 | 123 | (United Kingdom) Johnston Stewart | Kosmic | Vortex | V | 17 | +13.877^{5} | 14 |
| 10 | 106 | (Poland) Aleksander Czub | Kosmic | Vortex | V | 17 | +14.398^{6} | 7 |

Tyres key
| B | Bridgestone | L | LeCont |
| C | Carlisle | M | Maxxis |
| D | Dunlop | M | MG Tires |
| G | Goodyear | M | Mojo |
| K | Komet | V | Vega |

Notes
- Senior fastest lap: (Poland) Adrian Potępa (Kosmic–Vortex) – 50.991 (lap 12)
- Junior fastest lap: (Lithuania) Vydūnas Piktys (Kosmic–Vortex) – 51.271 (lap 16)
- ^1 – Lieke van Boekel finished sixth, but received a five-second time penalty for front fairing irregularities.
- ^2 – Nikodem Osiecki finished seventh, but received a five-second time penalty for front fairing irregularities.
- ^3 – Vito Ćoza finished fifth, but received a five-second time penalty for causing a collision.
- ^4 – Stanisław Grabowski finished sixth, but received a five-second time penalty for front fairing irregularities.
- ^5 – Johnston Stewart received a five-second time penalty for front fairing irregularities.
- ^6 – Aleksander Czub received a five-second time penalty for front fairing irregularities.

== See also ==
- 2026 in international kart racing
- 2026 Karting World Championship
