= World Circuit La Conca =

Kart circuit in Apulia, Italy

(Italy) World Circuit La Conca
The Valley
- Location: Muro Leccese, Apulia, Italy
- Coordinates: 40°7′44″N 18°21′0″E
- Capacity: 3,500
- Owner: Luca De Donno
- Broke ground: 1997; 29 years ago
- Opened: 1998; 28 years ago
- Major events: CIK-FIA World Championship (5); CIK-FIA World Cup (1); CIK-FIA European Championship (11)
- Website: kartodromolaconca.com

International Circuit (2001–present)
- Surface: Asphalt
- Length: 1.250 km (0.777 mi)
- Turns: 14
- Race lap record: 44.600 ( (United Kingdom) Arvid Lindblad, KR–IAME, 2021, OK)

World Circuit La Conca (Italian pronunciation: [la ˈkoŋka]; lit. 'the Valley') is a 1.250 km (0.777 mi) international kart circuit in Muro Leccese, Apulia, Italy. Founded in 1998, La Conca has hosted five editions of the CIK-FIA World Championship, one edition of the CIK-FIA World Cup, and 11 editions of the CIK-FIA European Championship.

Located 28.6 km (17.8 mi) south-east of Lecce city centre, La Conca first held competitive events in 1999. It was expanded to its present length in 2001 and became an international venue. Only a year later, it held its first World Championship event, which it later welcomed again in 2004, 2008, and 2015. During this period, it also held nine European Championship rounds across four events. After a 12-year absence, it returned to the European Championship in 2026.

La Conca features a high-speed layout with a 3,500-capacity grandstand for international events. The venue is known for its difficulty and high grip levels, and is one of 12 Italian venues homologated by the Commission Internationale de Karting (CIK-FIA).

== History ==
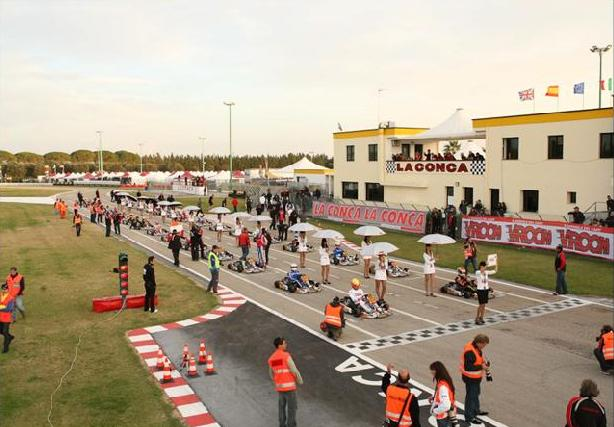
La Conca was inaugurated in 1998 and first held competitions a year later.

La Conca, located within a tourist and sports centre in Muro Leccese, was opened to the public in April 1998 and held its first competitive kart racing events 15 months later. It was initially 1.050 km (0.652 mi) in length before it was expanded to 1.250 km (0.777 mi) in 2001. The circuit is owned and operated by the De Donno brothers, including Luca, the founder of WSK Promotion. It has become known as the "karting capital of the world".

== Layout and facilities ==
The main international circuit of La Conca utilises 14 corners across 1.250 km (0.777 mi), with a variation of wide- and low-radius curves. There are four major braking zones. Ignoring the S-curve before the finish line, the main straight is 250 m (820 ft) long. The track has a width ranging from 9–10 m (30–33 ft) and lies approximately 90 m (300 ft) above sea level. It is a high-speed circuit, with average KZ speeds clocking in at over 98 km/h (61 mph).

The venue features a 3,500-capacity grandstand for major events and is homologated by the Commission Internationale de Karting (CIK-FIA), requiring private rooms for the stewards, the timekeepers, the CIK-FIA officials, both the race director and the clerk of the course, the marshals, and the announcer; secretariats for both the race directors and the event officials; a medical centre; a briefing room; and a press room.

== Climate ==
La Conca is known for its "sweltering" summer temperatures, resulting in a high-grip environment.

Climate data for Lecce (1981–2010)
Month	Jan	Feb	Mar	Apr	May	Jun	Jul	Aug	Sep	Oct	Nov	Dec	Year
Record high °C (°F)	21.2 (70.2)	22.4 (72.3)	28.6 (83.5)	30.4 (86.7)	35.6 (96.1)	44.0 (111.2)	44.4 (111.9)	42.6 (108.7)	40.6 (105.1)	34.2 (93.6)	26.8 (80.2)	21.4 (70.5)	44.4 (111.9)
Mean daily maximum °C (°F)	13.1 (55.6)	13.4 (56.1)	15.9 (60.6)	19.3 (66.7)	24.9 (76.8)	29.5 (85.1)	32.3 (90.1)	32.2 (90.0)	27.7 (81.9)	22.8 (73.0)	17.8 (64.0)	14.1 (57.4)	21.9 (71.4)
Daily mean °C (°F)	8.4 (47.1)	8.5 (47.3)	10.6 (51.1)	13.7 (56.7)	18.5 (65.3)	22.7 (72.9)	25.5 (77.9)	25.6 (78.1)	21.8 (71.2)	17.7 (63.9)	13.1 (55.6)	9.7 (49.5)	16.3 (61.4)
Mean daily minimum °C (°F)	3.8 (38.8)	3.6 (38.5)	5.3 (41.5)	8.0 (46.4)	12.0 (53.6)	16.0 (60.8)	18.7 (65.7)	19.0 (66.2)	15.9 (60.6)	12.6 (54.7)	8.3 (46.9)	5.2 (41.4)	10.7 (51.3)
Record low °C (°F)	−12.0 (10.4)	−5.6 (21.9)	−4.6 (23.7)	−1.8 (28.8)	3.2 (37.8)	7.4 (45.3)	10.4 (50.7)	10.8 (51.4)	6.0 (42.8)	1.1 (34.0)	−2.8 (27.0)	−5.4 (22.3)	−12.0 (10.4)
Average precipitation mm (inches)	60.3 (2.37)	61.3 (2.41)	62.4 (2.46)	45.5 (1.79)	27.6 (1.09)	20.4 (0.80)	16.2 (0.64)	36.0 (1.42)	54.3 (2.14)	91.0 (3.58)	95.1 (3.74)	68.9 (2.71)	639 (25.15)
Average precipitation days (≥ 1.0 mm)	7.9	6.9	6.9	6.2	4.4	3.0	1.9	2.2	4.8	6.3	7.8	7.8	66.1
Average relative humidity (%)	78.3	75.6	73.9	72.7	69.2	66.3	65.2	66.7	72.4	77.1	80.0	79.5	73.1
Average dew point °C (°F)	5.8 (42.4)	5.7 (42.3)	7.1 (44.8)	9.7 (49.5)	12.5 (54.5)	15.5 (59.9)	17.4 (63.3)	18.8 (65.8)	17.1 (62.8)	14.6 (58.3)	11.2 (52.2)	7.2 (45.0)	11.9 (53.4)
Source 1: Istituto Superiore per la Protezione e la Ricerca Ambientale
Source 2: NCEI(Precipitation days-Humidity-Dew Point 1991–2020), World Meteorological Organization (precipitation) altervista (extremes)

== Reception ==
In Vroomkart's "Circuit of the Month" feature in August 2008, Maurizio Voltini proclaimed La Conca as "one of the best circuits in Europe", highlighting its difficulty and high average speeds. Writing for Red Bull GmbH in 2018, Piers Prior and Greg Stuart listed La Conca as one of the eight best circuits in Europe, noting its demanding temperatures in the summer and high grip levels, further stating that its "place in the theoretical karting Hall of Fame is undisputed".

== Lap records ==
The international race lap records at La Conca in open CIK-FIA classes:

International race lap records at La Conca
Class	Time	Driver	Chassis	Engine	Tyres	Championship	Date
OK	44.600	(United Kingdom) Arvid Lindblad	KR	IAME	L	WSK Super Master Series	14 March 2021
KZ2	45.310	(Netherlands) Stan Pex	CRG	Vortex	V	WSK Super Master Series	3 April 2016
KZ (Note: Previously known as KZ1.)	45.325	(United Kingdom) Jordon Lennox-Lamb	Birel ART	Parilla	V	WSK Super Master Series	3 April 2016
KF (Note: Previously known as KF2.)	45.641	(United Kingdom) Tom Joyner	Zanardi	TM	V	CIK-FIA World Championship	27 September 2015
OK-J	45.753	(Russia) Maximilian Popov	Tony Kart	Vortex	V	WSK Super Master Series	14 March 2021
KZ2-M	45.935	(Italy) Davide Forè	Birel ART	TM	L	WSK Open Series	10 May 2024
KF-J (Note: Previously known as KF3.)	45.960	(Denmark) Noah Watt	FA Kart	Vortex	L	CIK-FIA World Championship	27 September 2015
KF1 (Note: Including Super-KF (SKF) from 2009 to 2010.)	46.252	(United Kingdom) Alexander Albon	Intrepid	TM	V	WSK Euro Series	26 June 2011
FSA	46.545	(Netherlands) Giedo van der Garde	CRG	Maxter	B	CIK-FIA World Championship	27 October 2002
ICC	46.771	(Italy) Davide Forè	Tony Kart	Vortex	V	Italian Open Masters	26 March 2006
FA	46.892	(Italy) Davide Gaggianesi	Top-Kart	TM	B	CIK-FIA European Championship	21 August 2005
S-ICC	46.927	(Italy) Alessandro Manetti	Intrepid	TM	V	CIK-FIA European Championship	7 May 2006
ICA	47.356	(Italy) Antonio Piccioni	Tony Kart	Vortex	D	Italian Open Masters	26 March 2006
ICA-J	48.577	(Italy) Felice Tiene	CRG	Parilla	V	WSK International Series	4 February 2006

Last updated on 12 April 2026.

== Events ==
=== CIK-FIA ===
Since its inception, La Conca has hosted five World Championships, one World Cup, and 11 European Championships sanctioned by the Commission Internationale de Karting (CIK-FIA):

- CIK-FIA World Championship: 2002 (FSA), 2004 (FA), 2008 (KF1), 2015 (KF, KF-J)
- CIK-FIA World Cup: 2008 (KF2)
- CIK-FIA European Championship: 2005 (FA, ICA), 2006 (FA, S-ICC, ICC), 2009 (SKF, KZ2), 2014 (KF, KF-J), 2026 (OK, OK-J)

==== CIK-FIA World Championship results ====
CIK-FIA World Championship results at La Conca
Year	Winner	Chassis	Engine	Tyres	Runner-up	Third place	Class	Stroke
2002	(Netherlands) Giedo van der Garde*	CRG	Maxter	B	(Italy) Davide Forè	(Italy) Ronnie Quintarelli	FSA	100cc
2002	(Netherlands) Giedo van der Garde*	CRG	Maxter	B	(Netherlands) Carlo van Dam	(Italy) Davide Forè	FSA	100cc
2004	(Italy) Davide Forè	Tony Kart	Vortex	B	(France) Arnaud Kozlinski	(Netherlands) Bas Lammers	FA	100cc
2008	(Italy) Marco Ardigò	Tony Kart	Vortex	B	(Czech Republic) Libor Toman	(United Kingdom) Gary Catt	KF1	125cc
2008	(United Kingdom) Oliver Rowland	Tony Kart	Vortex	D	(Czech Republic) Zdeněk Groman	(France) Loïc Réguillon	KF2†	125cc
2015	(Poland) Karol Basz	Kosmic	Vortex	V	(United Kingdom) Jordon Lennox-Lamb	(Denmark) Nicklas Nielsen	KF	125cc
2015	(United States) Logan Sargeant*	FA Kart	Vortex	L	(France) Clément Novalak	(Brazil) Caio Collet	KF-J	125cc

^{†} Class held as a CIK-FIA World Cup.

==== CIK-FIA European Championship results ====
CIK-FIA European Championship results at La Conca
Year	Winner	Chassis	Engine	Tyres	Class	Stroke
2005	(United Kingdom) Oliver Oakes	Gillard	Parilla	B	FA	100cc
2005	(United Kingdom) Oliver Oakes	Gillard	Parilla	B	FA	100cc
2005	(United Kingdom) James Calado‡	Tony Kart	Vortex	B	ICA	100cc
2006	(Italy) Marco Ardigò	Tony Kart	Vortex	B	FA	100cc
2006	(France) Armand Convers	PCR	PCR	B	FA	100cc
2006	(Italy) Roberto Toninelli	BRM	TM	V	S-ICC	125cc
2006	(Italy) Alessandro Piccini	Intrepid	TM	V	S-ICC	125cc
2006	(Germany) Ernst Behrens	Energy	TM	V	ICC	125cc
2006	(Italy) Alessandro Giulietti	Tony Kart	TM	V	ICC	125cc
2009	(Finland) Simo Puhakka	PCR	TM	B	SKF	125cc
2009	(United Kingdom) Jason Parrott	Birel	Parilla	B	SKF	125cc
2009	(Czech Republic) Patrik Hájek	Tony Kart	Vortex	D	KZ2	125cc
2009	(Czech Republic) Patrik Hájek	Tony Kart	Vortex	D	KZ2	125cc
2014	(United Kingdom) Callum Ilott	Zanardi	Parilla	D	KF	125cc
2014	(United Kingdom) Enaam Ahmed	FA Kart	Vortex	V	KF-J	125cc
2026	(United Kingdom) Noah Baglin	KR	IAME	M	OK	125cc
2026	(United Kingdom) Will Green	KR	IAME	M	OK-J	125cc

== In popular culture ==
La Conca features in the 2013 sim racing game RFactor 2 as an additional track to the KartSim software.

== See also ==
- Automobile Club d'Italia
- Kart racing
- Kart circuit
