= Kartódromo Internacional Lucas Guerrero =

Kart circuit in Valencia, Spain

(Spain) Kartódromo Internacional Lucas Guerrero
Kartódromo de Valencia
- Location: Chiva, Valencia, Spain
- Coordinates: 39°30′27″N 0°44′49″W
- Owner: Lucas Guerrero
- Broke ground: 2011; 15 years ago
- Opened: 2014; 12 years ago
- Construction cost: €2,000,000
- Major events: CIK-FIA European Championship (8)
- Website: kartodromovalencia.com

International Circuit (2014–present)
- Surface: Asphalt
- Length: 1.428 km (0.887 mi)
- Turns: 14
- Race lap record: 53.527 ( (France) Louis Iglesias, CRG–IAME, 2024, OK)

The Kartódromo Internacional Lucas Guerrero (Spanish pronunciation: [kaɾˈtoðɾomo inteɾnasjoˈnal ˈlukas ɣeˈreɾo]; lit. 'Lucas Guerrero International Kart Circuit'), also known as the Kartódromo de Valencia, is a 1.428 km (0.887 mi) international kart circuit in Chiva, Valencia, Spain. Founded in 2014, Valencia has hosted eight editions of the CIK-FIA European Championship.

Located 32.1 km (19.9 mi) west of Valencia city centre and 10.3 km (6.4 mi) west of Circuit Ricardo Tormo, Valencia was opened in 2014 and began hosting international competitions that year. Nine years later, it held its first European Championship round, and has since been a recurring venue on the calendar, hosting four events. As a support event, it has hosted two editions of the CIK-FIA Academy Trophy.

Valencia features a high-speed layout with a various facilities for international events. The venue is known for its wide-radius corners and is one of six Spanish venues homologated by the Commission Internationale de Karting (CIK-FIA).

== History ==
A former racing driver and Spanish Championship winner, Lucas Guerrero, purchased 150,000 m^{2} (1,600,000 ft^{2}) near Valencia and began constructing the circuit in 2011. After three years of deliberating with the City Council of Valencia and gaining the necessary permits, as well as an investment of €2,000,000, Valencia was opened to the public in 2014 and debuted in the España Series Rotax before featuring in the RMC Grand Finals. The circuit soon reached international status with the Commission Internationale de Karting (CIK-FIA) and also began hosting motorcycle road racing events. A dirt track was constructed in the 40,000 m^{2} (430,000 ft^{2}) available for supermoto events.

== Layout and facilities ==
The main international circuit of Valencia utilises 14 corners across 1.428 km (0.887 mi), many of which are wide-radius curves with two chicanes. The track has a maximum width of 9 m (30 ft) and lies 317–322 m (1,040–1,056 ft) above sea level. It is a high-speed circuit, with average OK speeds clocking in at approximately 93 km/h (58 mph). There are three additional layouts for national events and other categories of racing.

The venue is homologated by the Commission Internationale de Karting (CIK-FIA), requiring private rooms for the stewards, the timekeepers, the CIK-FIA officials, both the race director and the clerk of the course, the marshals, and the announcer; secretariats for both the race directors and the event officials; a medical centre; a briefing room; and a press room. There is additionally a terraced social area with a bar.

== Climate ==
Climate data for Valencia (1991–2020)
Month	Jan	Feb	Mar	Apr	May	Jun	Jul	Aug	Sep	Oct	Nov	Dec	Year
Mean daily maximum °C (°F)	16.8 (62.2)	17.4 (63.3)	19.4 (66.9)	21.2 (70.2)	24.0 (75.2)	27.5 (81.5)	29.9 (85.8)	30.6 (87.1)	28.0 (82.4)	24.6 (76.3)	20.2 (68.4)	17.4 (63.3)	23.1 (73.6)
Daily mean °C (°F)	12.1 (53.8)	12.7 (54.9)	14.7 (58.5)	16.6 (61.9)	19.6 (67.3)	23.3 (73.9)	25.9 (78.6)	26.5 (79.7)	23.7 (74.7)	20.1 (68.2)	15.6 (60.1)	12.8 (55.0)	18.6 (65.6)
Mean daily minimum °C (°F)	7.5 (45.5)	8.0 (46.4)	9.9 (49.8)	11.9 (53.4)	15.1 (59.2)	19.0 (66.2)	21.9 (71.4)	22.5 (72.5)	19.3 (66.7)	15.6 (60.1)	11.0 (51.8)	8.3 (46.9)	14.2 (57.5)
Average precipitation mm (inches)	39 (1.5)	30 (1.2)	40 (1.6)	33 (1.3)	36 (1.4)	26 (1.0)	7 (0.3)	15 (0.6)	70 (2.8)	63 (2.5)	52 (2.0)	48 (1.9)	459 (18.1)
Average precipitation days (≥ 1mm)	3.9	3.5	4.1	4.5	4.2	2.2	1.2	2.3	5.2	4.7	4.3	4.3	44.4
Average relative humidity (%)	65	64	64	62	66	66	68	68	67	68	66	66	66
Mean monthly sunshine hours	174	181	217	237	267	282	313	288	237	208	171	158	2,733
Source: Agencia Estatal de Meteorologia (AEMET OpenData)

== Reception ==
In 2017, José Omedas of Vroomkart Spain stated the circuit had become one of the most important in the country despite its short history. ABC had described it as "the most modern circuit in Spain" upon its inauguration. Giuliano Ciucci Giuliani of Vroomkart said in 2023 that it "resembles a typical [Formula One] track, with wide corners and a couple of chicanes just to break the monotony", noting that it was fast but "not very captivating".

== Lap records ==
The international race lap records at Valencia in open CIK-FIA classes:

International race lap records at La Conca
Class	Time	Driver	Chassis	Engine	Tyres	Championship	Date
OK	53.527	(France) Louis Iglesias	CRG	IAME	MA	CIK-FIA European Championship	24 March 2024
KZ	54.621	(Italy) Cristian Bertuca	Birel ART	TM	D	Champions of the Future	10 May 2025
KZ2	54.851	(Netherlands) Kasper Schormans	Sodi	TM	D	Champions of the Future	8 May 2025
OK-J	55.311	(United Kingdom) Noah Baglin	KR	IAME	MA	Champions of the Future	8 March 2024

Last updated on 18 May 2025.

== Events ==
=== CIK-FIA ===
Since its inception, Valencia has hosted eight European Championships and two Academy Trophies sanctioned by the Commission Internationale de Karting (CIK-FIA):

- CIK-FIA European Championship: 2023–2024 (OK, OK-J), 2025 (KZ, KZ2), 2026 (OK, OK-J)
- CIK-FIA Academy Trophy: 2025 (Academy-Junior), 2026 (Academy-Senior)

==== CIK-FIA European Championship results ====
CIK-FIA European Championship results at Valencia
Year	Winner	Chassis	Engine	Tyres	Class	Stroke
2023	(United Kingdom) Joe Turney	KR	IAME	MG	OK	125cc
2023	(Belgium) Thibaut Ramaekers	KR	IAME	V	OK-J	125cc
2024	(Brazil) Gabriel Gomez	CRG	IAME	MA	OK	125cc
2024	(Belgium) Dries Van Langendonck	Exprit	TM	MA	OK-J	125cc
2025	(Spain) Pedro Hiltbrand	Birel ART	TM	D	KZ	125cc
2025	Maksim Orlov	Sodi	TM	D	KZ2	125cc
2026	(United Kingdom) Noah Baglin	KR	IAME	MA	OK	125cc
2026	(Spain) Daniel Mirón	KR	IAME	MA	OK-J	125cc

== In popular culture ==
Valencia features in the 2013 sim racing game RFactor 2 as an additional track to the KartSim software.

== See also ==
- Royal Spanish Automobile Federation
- Kart racing
- Kart circuit
