= Monaco Kart Cup =

Kart racing championship in Monte Carlo, Monaco

CIK-FIA Monaco Kart Cup
- Circuit de Monaco
- Category: Kart racing
- Country: Monaco
- Affiliations: Automobile Club de Monaco; CIK-FIA
- Inaugural season: 1995
- Folded: 2010
- Classes: 2 (KZ2, KF3)
- Last Drivers' champion: (France) Norman Nato (KZ2) (Monaco) Charles Leclerc (KF3)

The CIK-FIA Monaco Kart Cup was a kart racing competition organised by the Automobile Club de Monaco (ACM) and sanctioned by the Commission Internationale de Karting (CIK-FIA) at the Circuit de Monaco in La Condamine, Monaco.

Founded in 1995, the event was contested until 2010 by drivers in junior and senior classes. The kart circuit followed Port Hercules of the famous Formula One track, including corners such as Tabac, La Piscine and La Rascasse. The junior race was known as the Junior Monaco Grand Prix (Note: French: Grand Prix de Monaco Junior) from 2006 to 2010.

Notable winners of the Monaco Kart Cup include Formula One World Drivers' Champions Michael Schumacher and Sebastian Vettel, as well as other Formula One drivers Robert Kubica, Carlos Sainz Jr. and Charles Leclerc.

== History ==
=== Early years (1995–2000) ===
The starting grid for the 2009 CIK-FIA Monaco Kart Cup KZ2 race

The Monaco Kart Cup was founded in 1995 by the Automobile Club de Monaco. It was initially contested in the direct-drive Formula A (FA) and Junior Intercontinental A (ICA-J) classes, as well as the gearbox Intercontinental C (ICC) class. The inaugural FA event was won by Nicola Gianniberti, with Éric Salignon winning the junior event and Portuguese driver Jaime Correia winning the ICC race.

In 1996, reigning two-time Formula One World Drivers' Champion Michael Schumacher entered the senior FA class, dominating the final to add the Monaco Kart Cup to his racing accolades.

The 1997 edition saw Salignon add to his 1995 title by winning the senior class, becoming the only driver to win in both the junior and the senior classes at the Monaco Kart Cup. Gianluca Beggio secured his second consecutive ICC title, adding to his five World Championships and three European Championships. The gearbox class was discontinued after the 1999 edition, not returning until 2009.

Robert Kubica took back-to-back junior titles in 1998 and 1999, becoming the first—and to this date, only—driver to win multiple Junior Monaco Kart Cups. Jérôme d'Ambrosio ended his reign in 2000, beating Michael Ammermüller and Carlo van Dam to the title.

=== Expansion and first cancellation (2001–2005) ===
The Monaco Stars Cup was hosted in 2001 and 2002 as an all-star race, won by Formula One drivers Gianni Morbidelli and Giorgio Pantano, respectively. The one-off Challenge Star Team was also contested in 2001, won by Italian driver Stefano Tilly. That year's junior event saw future four-time Formula One World Drivers' Champion Sebastian Vettel's victory, adding to his European Championship that season.

The 2002 Monaco Kart Cup saw the introduction of the 6 Hours of Monte Carlo, a six-hour endurance race around the Principality, held continuously until the final meeting in 2010. It was also the final year of the senior direct-drive FA class, with Benjamin Horstman successfully defending his 2001 title; Alexander Sims took the junior crown.

From 2003 to 2004, development work to the harbour at Port Hercules saw the cancellation of the event in those years. The 2005 edition saw the introduction of the Monaco Four-Stroke Contest, using 250cc four-stroke engines. The one-off Monaco Rok Up was also contested that year, won by Swiss driver Antonio Ruggiero.

=== Junior Monaco Grand Prix and second cancellation (2006–2010) ===
The Junior Monaco Kart Cup was revived in 2006 as the Junior Monaco Grand Prix, now running as the primary class. Scott Jenkins beat compatriot Oliver Rowland, driving for Intrepid.

The all-star race returned in electric karts in 2007 as the one-off Monaco Elec-Kart Trophy, won by 1998 24 Hours of Le Mans winner Stéphane Ortelli, becoming the first Monégasque driver to win an individual event at the Monaco Kart Cup. The junior class was contested under the newly established KF3 regulations, won by Max Goff.

The senior gearbox class returned in 2009, replacing the four-stroke event and running the secondary KZ2 regulations. French driver Anthony Abbasse won the first KZ2 event, with Carlos Sainz Jr. winning the Junior Monaco Grand Prix.

2010—the final year of the event—saw hometown hero Charles Leclerc take the KF3 crown ahead of Dennis Olsen and Pierre Gasly. The KZ2 race was won by Norman Nato, driving for CRG. The 2011 edition was cancelled due to unspecified technical reasons, marking the end of the Monaco Kart Cup.

== Circuit ==
The Circuit de Monaco kart circuit during the 2008 CIK-FIA Monaco Kart Cup

The Monaco Kart Cup was contested at the Circuit de Monaco, a street circuit in Monte Carlo, home of the Formula One Monaco Grand Prix since 1929. The track featured the port complex of the Grand Prix circuit—Tabac, La Piscine and La Rascasse—as well as the Formula One pit lane. The exit of the pit lane was connected to the port via a ramp and a hairpin corner. The 1,075 m (3,527 ft) circuit featured over 2,400 Tecpro barrier modules, 120 marshals, eight cameras, and four jumbotrons.

== Winners ==
Key
Drivers
*	Driver has competed in Formula One		
†	Formula One World Drivers' Champion		
‡	FIA World Champion in an auto racing discipline		
Tyres
B	Bridgestone	L	LeCont
C	Carlisle	M	Maxxis
D	Dunlop	M	MG Tires
G	Goodyear	M	Mojo
K	Komet	V	Vega

=== Junior direct-drive class (1995–2010) ===
The junior direct-drive class was held from the inaugural 1995 edition until its final 2010 edition. Until 2007, it was contested under ICA-J regulations, prior to the class being replaced by KF3 in international competition.

Robert Kubica was the only driver to win multiple Junior Monaco Grands Prix, winning back-to-back in 1998 and 1999. Notable winners in the junior class also include four-time Formula One World Drivers' Champion Sebastian Vettel and Formula One drivers Jérôme d'Ambrosio, Carlos Sainz Jr. and Charles Leclerc.

Year	Winner	Chassis	Engine	Tyres	Runner-up	Third place	Class	Stroke	Report
1995	(France) Éric Salignon						ICA-J	100cc	Report
1996	(Netherlands) Nelson van der Pol						ICA-J	100cc	Report
1997	(Germany) Marvin Bylitza						ICA-J	100cc	Report
1998	(Poland) Robert Kubica*						ICA-J	100cc	Report
1999	(Poland) Robert Kubica* (2)				(United Kingdom) Paul di Resta*	(Germany) Helmut Sanden	ICA-J	100cc	Report
2000	(Belgium) Jérôme d'Ambrosio*				(Germany) Michael Ammermüller	(Netherlands) Carlo van Dam	ICA-J	100cc	Report
2001	(Germany) Sebastian Vettel†						ICA-J	100cc	Report
2002	(United Kingdom) Alexander Sims	(Italy) Maranello	(Italy) Maxter	V	(France) Jean-Karl Vernay	(France) Thomas Mich	ICA-J	100cc	Report
2003 – 2005	Not held due to development work at Port Hercules								
2006	(United Kingdom) Scott Jenkins	(Italy) Intrepid	(Italy) Parilla	B	(United Kingdom) Oliver Rowland	(United Kingdom) Nigel Moore	ICA-J	100cc	Report
2007	(United Kingdom) Max Goff	(Italy) Maranello	(Spain) XTR	D	(United Kingdom) Jack Harvey	(France) Brandon Maïsano	KF3	125cc	Report
2008	(Finland) Aaro Vainio	(Italy) Maranello	(Italy) Maxter	D	(France) Brandon Maïsano	(France) Pascal Belmaaziz	KF3	125cc	Report
2009	(Spain) Carlos Sainz Jr.*	(Italy) FA Kart	(Italy) Vortex	V	(France) Pascal Belmaaziz	(France) Rémy Deguffroy	KF3	125cc	Report
2010	(Monaco) Charles Leclerc*	(France) Sodi	(Italy) Parilla	D	(Norway) Dennis Olsen	(France) Pierre Gasly*	KF3	125cc	Report
2011	Cancelled								

=== Senior direct-drive class (1995–2002) ===
From 1995 to 2002, the senior class at the Monaco Kart Cup was run under the secondary direct-drive Formula A (FA) regulations.

Benjamin Horstman was the only driver to win multiple senior direct-drive Monaco Kart Cups, winning back-to-back in 2001 and 2002. Notable winners include seven-time Formula One World Drivers' Champion Michael Schumacher, who entered the event upon winning his second World Championship.

Year	Winner	Chassis	Engine	Tyres	Runner-up	Third place	Class	Stroke	Report
1995	(Italy) Nicola Gianniberti						FA	100cc	Report
1996	(Germany) Michael Schumacher†						FA	100cc	Report
1997	(France) Éric Salignon						FA	100cc	Report
1998	(Italy) Sauro Cesetti						FA	100cc	Report
1999	(Belgium) Jan Heylen				(France) Patrick Pilet	(Italy) Cesare Balistreri	FA	100cc	Report
2000	(United Kingdom) Colin Brown				(Australia) Benjamin Horstman	(Finland) Heikki Kovalainen*	FA	100cc	Report
2001	(Australia) Benjamin Horstman				(France) Pierre Ragues	(Belgium) Jérôme d'Ambrosio*	FA	100cc	Report
2002	(Australia) Benjamin Horstman (2)	(Italy) Biesse	(United States) Fox	B	(Italy) Cesare Balistreri	(Belgium) Jérôme d'Ambrosio*	FA	100cc	Report

=== Senior gearbox class (1995–2010) ===
The secondary gearbox class Intercontinental C (ICC) was contested as a tertiary competition at the Monaco Kart Cup from 1995 to 1999. After a seven-year hiatus, the senior class returned in 2009 under KZ2 regulations, replacing FA.

Gianluca Beggio was the only driver to win multiple gearbox Monaco Grands Prix, winning back-to-back in 1998 and 1999.

Year	Winner	Chassis	Engine	Tyres	Runner-up	Third place	Class	Stroke	Report
1995	(Portugal) Jaime Correia						ICC	125cc	Report
1996	(Italy) Gianluca Beggio						ICC	125cc	Report
1997	(Italy) Gianluca Beggio (2)						ICC	125cc	Report
1998	(Hungary) András Bakos						ICC	125cc	Report
1999	(Czech Republic) Viktor Wagner						ICC	125cc	Report
2000 – 2008	Not held								
2009	(France) Anthony Abbasse	(France) Sodi	(Italy) TM	D	(France) Thomas Mich	(Switzerland) Ken Allemann	KZ2	125cc	Report
2010	(France) Norman Nato	(Italy) CRG	(Italy) Maxter	V	(Italy) Paolo De Conto	(France) Anthony Abbasse	KZ2	125cc	Report
2011	Cancelled								

== 6 Hours of Monte Carlo ==
From 2002 to 2010, a six-hour endurance race was held at the Monaco Kart Cup, contested as the Six Heures de Monte-Carlo.

=== Winners of the 6 Hours of Monte Carlo ===
Year	Winners	Nationality	Report
2002	HUGO BOSS Watches	Italy	Report
2003 – 2004	Not held due to development work at Port Hercules		
2005	Kartograph	United Kingdom	Report
2006	Fast and Furious	Monaco	Report
2007	londonliving.com	Germany	Report
2008	Technique Engineering	Italy	Report
2009	Kartograph (2)	United Kingdom	Report
2010	Felle Europe	France	Report

== Monaco Stars Cup ==
From 2001 to 2002, the Monaco Stars Cup was held as an all-star race, contested again in 2007 as the Monaco Elec-Kart Trophy, or the VIP Electric Trophée, in electric karts.

=== Winners of the Monaco Stars Cup ===
Year	Winner	Report
2001	(Italy) Gianni Morbidelli*	Report
2002	(Italy) Giorgio Pantano*	Report
2003 – 2006	Not held	
2007 (Note: Held as the Monaco Elec-Kart Trophy.)	(Monaco) Stéphane Ortelli	Report

== Monaco Four-Stroke Contest ==
From 2005 to 2008, a 250cc four-stroke race was held at the Monaco Kart Cup, contested as the Monaco Four-Stroke Contest.

=== Winners of the Monaco Four-Stroke Contest ===
Year	Winner	Chassis	Engine	Tyres	Runner-up	Third place	Class	Stroke	Report
2005	(France) Wilfried Martins						Four-stroke	250cc	Report
2006	(Germany) Claudio Mack						Four-stroke	250cc	Report
2007	(Germany) Christian Voss	(Italy) Kosmic	(Switzerland) Suter	B	(United States) Kyle Ray	(France) Anthony Puppo	Four-stroke	250cc	Report
2008	(Italy) Fabian Federer	(Italy) CRG	(Italy) Tech-F1	B	(Germany) Sebastian Golz	(Italy) Alberto Cavalieri	Four-stroke	250cc	Report

== See also ==
- KZ2 – the senior gearbox class
- KF3 – the junior direct-drive class
- Circuit de Monaco
- Karting World Championship
- Karting European Championship
- Commission Internationale de Karting
- Fédération Internationale de l'Automobile
- Automobile Club de Monaco
- Kart racing
- List of kart racing championships
- List of FIA championships
