= Formula A =

Formula A may refer to:

- Formula 5000, a defunct auto racing class in use 1968–1982, also called Formula A
- Formula K, a defunct 100 cc karting class, later called Formula A, now known as KF1
