= Karting Genk =

Kart circuit in Limburg, Belgium

(Belgium) Karting Genk
Home of Champions
- Location: Genk, Limburg, Belgium
- Coordinates: 50°59′18″N 5°33′51″E
- Broke ground: 1983; 43 years ago
- Opened: 1983; 43 years ago
- Major events: CIK-FIA World Championship (2); CIK-FIA World Cup (4); CIK-FIA European Championship (29)
- Website: kartinggenk.be

International Circuit (2005–present)
- Surface: Asphalt
- Length: 1.360 km (0.845 mi)
- Turns: 12
- Race lap record: 50.603 ( (France) Émilien Denner, Sodi–TM, 2022, KZ)

Karting Genk (Dutch pronunciation: [ɣɛŋk]), formerly known as Horensbergdam, is a 1.360 km (0.845 mi) international kart circuit in Genk, Limburg, Belgium. Founded in 1983, Genk has hosted two editions of the CIK-FIA World Championship, four editions of the CIK-FIA World Cup, and 29 editions of the CIK-FIA European Championship.

Located 4.8 km (3.0 mi) north-east of Genk city centre, Genk first gained Commission Internationale de Karting (CIK-FIA) homologation in 1987. It first held the World Championship in 2011.

== History ==
It was founded in 1983 by karting builder Paul Lemmens and his wife Lisette. In 2005, it was completely restyled, in order to get a new FIA homologation. In 2011 it hosted the Karting World Championship. It hosted this competition again in 2018. MP Motorsport owner Henk de Jong bought the facilities in 2025.

The track is a regular on the European karting scene, featuring technical corners and hairpins as well as sweeping corners and overtaking opportunities.

== See also ==
- Royal Automobile Club of Belgium
- Kart racing
- Kart circuit
