= Matheus Morgatto =

Brazilian karting driver

- Nationality: (Brazil) Brazilian
- Born: 10 October 2003 (age 22) São Paulo, Brazil

Championship titles
- 2017 2018 2022 2023: Orlando Cup - Junior ROK Florida Winter Tour - Junior ROK FIA Karting World Championship Florida Winter Tour - Senior ROK ROK Vegas - ROK Pro GP

Matheus Morgatto Alvarenga (born 10 October 2003) is a Brazilian karting driver from Alphaville, São Paulo, competing in the OK and KZ2 categories for Birel ART Racing. In 2022, he won the FIA Karting World Championship in OK. He is currently ranked 22nd in the FIA International Karting Ranking in the OK category and 69th in the KZ2 category.

== Career ==
Morgatto began racing competitively in 2013, competing exclusively in North and South American championships until 2018. He found success early in the Florida Winter Tour, coming in second place in the Micro Max category in 2014, third in Mini ROK and second in Mini Max in 2016, third in Junior ROK in 2017, and first in Junior ROK in 2018. These results, along with his results in other series, led to him joining the Tony Kart Racing Team in 2019.

However, from 2019 to 2021, Morgatto was unable to claim an overall podium in any series. In these three years, he raced for Tony Kart Racing Team, Parolin Racing Kart, and Birel ART Racing.

In 2022, Morgatto won the FIA World Karting Championship in Naples with DPK Racing, beating the reigning champion Tuukka Taponen, who came in second place. Later that year, he once again won the Florida Winter Series, this time in the Senior ROK category.

In 2023, Morgatto won ROK Vegas in the ROK Pro GP category and took third place in the SKUSA Pro Tour in X30 Senior with PSL Karting. So far, in 2024, he has placed fifth in the FIA Karting European Championship's OK category, is racing in the Champions of the Future Euro Series, and is set to compete in the FIA World Karting Championship again with Birel ART Racing.

== Karting record ==
=== Karting career summary ===
Season	Series	Team	Position
2013	Florida Winter Tour - Micro Max		28th
2013	Brazilian Championship - Super Cadet		6th
2014	Florida Winter Tour - Micro Max	Legree Motorsports	2nd
2014	Copa Brasil de Kart - Junior		16th
2016	SKUSA SuperNationals - Mini Swift		27th
2016	Florida Winter Tour - Mini ROK		3rd
2016	Florida Winter Tour - Mini Max		2nd
2017	Florida Winter Tour - Junior ROK		3rd
2017	ROK Cup International Final - Junior ROK	Parolin Racing Kart	9th
2017	SKUSA SuperNationals - X30 Junior	Russell Karting Specialties	8th
2017	Orlando Cup - Junior ROK		1st
2018	SKUSA SuperNationals - X30 Senior	AM Engines	4th
2018	WSK Final Cup - OK		34th
2018	Florida Winter Tour - Junior ROK		1st
2018	SKUSA Pro Tour - X30 Junior		2nd
2019	South Garda Winter Cup - OK	Tony Kart Racing Team	13th
2019	WSK Super Master Series - OK	Tony Kart Racing Team	17th
2019	WSK Euro Series - OK	Tony Kart Racing Team	12th
2019	FIA World Karting Championship - OK	Tony Kart Racing Team	9th
2019	FIA Karting European Championship - OK	Tony Kart Racing Team	21st
2019	Italian ACI Karting Championship - OK		13th
2020	WSK Champions Cup - OK	Parolin Racing Kart	5th
2020	WSK Super Master Series - OK	Parolin Racing Kart	6th
2020	South Garda Winter Cup - OK	Parolin Racing Kart	34th
2020	FIA Karting European Championship	Parolin Racing Kart	14th
2020	WSK Euro Series - OK	Parolin Racing Kart and Birel ART Racing	11th
2020	FIA Karting World Championship - OK	Birel ART Racing	12th
2020	Italian ACI Karting Championship - OK		12th
2021	WSK Super Master Series - OK	Birel ART Racing	25th
2021	WSK Euro Series - OK	Birel ART Racing	15th
2021	Champions of the Future - OK	Birel ART Racing	5th
2021	FIA Karting European Championship - OK	Birel ART Racing	11th
2022	FIA Karting World Championship - OK	DPK Racing	1st
2022	FIA Karting European Championship - OK	DPK Karting	20th
2022	SKUSA SuperNationals - X30 Senior	AM Racing Team	40th
2022	Italian ACI Karting Championship		8th
2022	Florida Winter Tour - Senior ROK	AM Racing Team	1st
2023	FIA Karting World Championship - KZ2	Leclerc by Lennox Racing	11th
2023	FIA Karting World Championship - OK	Birel ART Racing	63rd
2023	FIA Karting European Championship - OK		17th
2023	SKUSA SuperNationals - X30 Senior	PSL Karting	24th
2023	ROK Vegas - ROK Pro GP	PSL Karting	1st
2023	SKUSA Pro Tour - X30 Senior	PSL Karting	3rd
2024	FIA Karting European Championship - OK	Birel ART Racing	5th
