= Liam Nachawati =

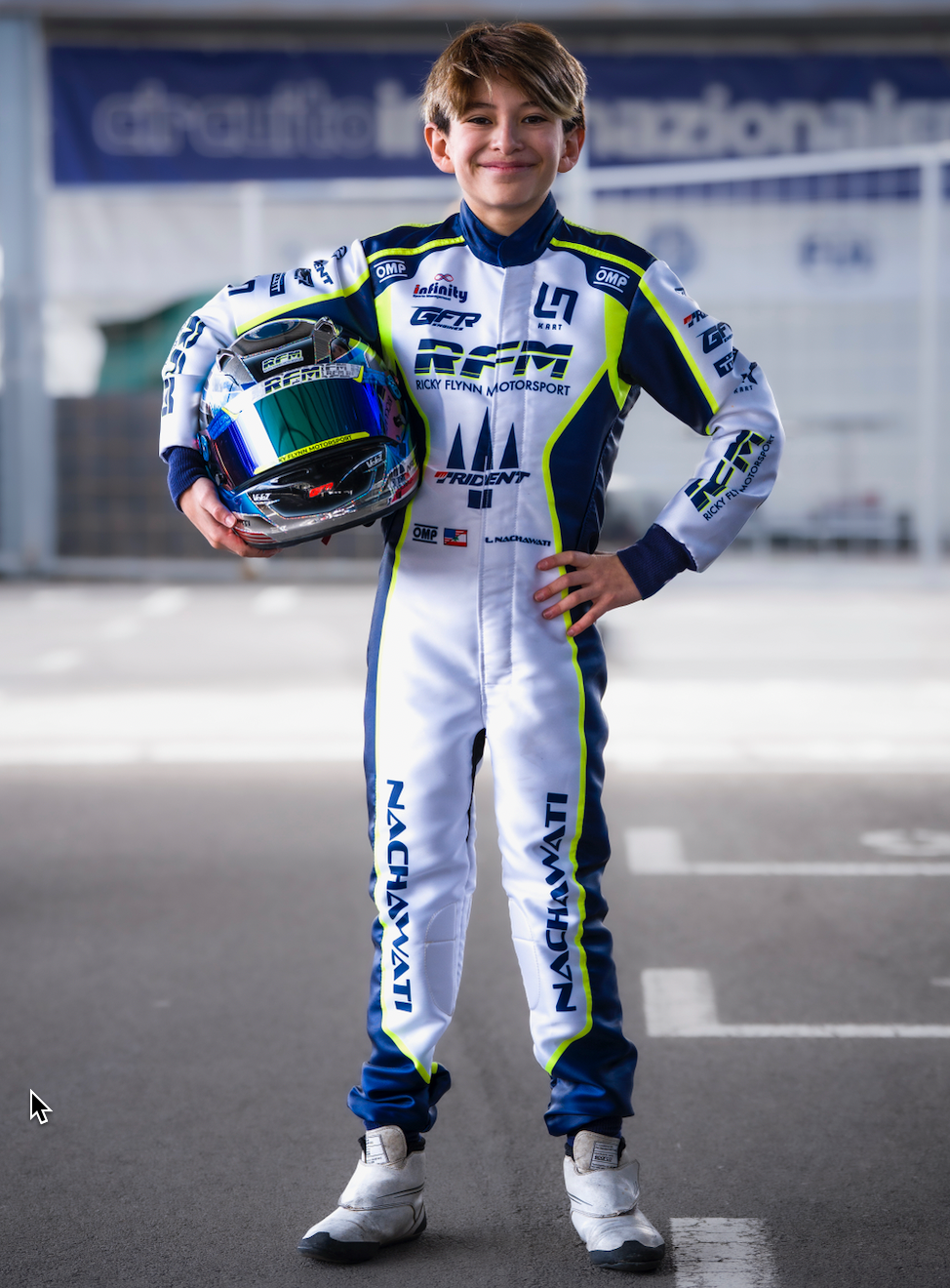
Liam Nachawati is an American kart racer.

Liam Nachawati is an American kart racer based in Dallas, Texas, who has raced in Europe and the United States. He drives for Ricky Flynn Motorsport in Europe and Rolison Performance Group in the U.S. Prior to 2026, he raced for Italy-based Babyrace Driver Academy under the direction of former Formula drivers Leonardo Lorandi and Alessio Lorandi, and Infinity Sports Management. In the U.S. he formerly raced under IndyCar racer Jay Howard's Jay Howard Driver Development.

== Early life ==
Nachawati began racing at age six when his father and uncle chipped in to purchase a kart during the 2020 pandemic. He showed promise on the track early and steadily moved up the ranks in local and regional races and later national and international races. He enrolled in the Laurel Springs School to accommodate his travel schedule. His social media presence includes more than 300,000 followers on Instagram, where he shares behind-the-scenes insight into the life of a young racer and promotes lifestyle brands on and off the track. In December 2026, Nachawati appeared on the Tim Conway Jr. Show podcast with Jay Leno, where Nachawati was described as the equivalent of an "Olympic athlete."

== Career ==
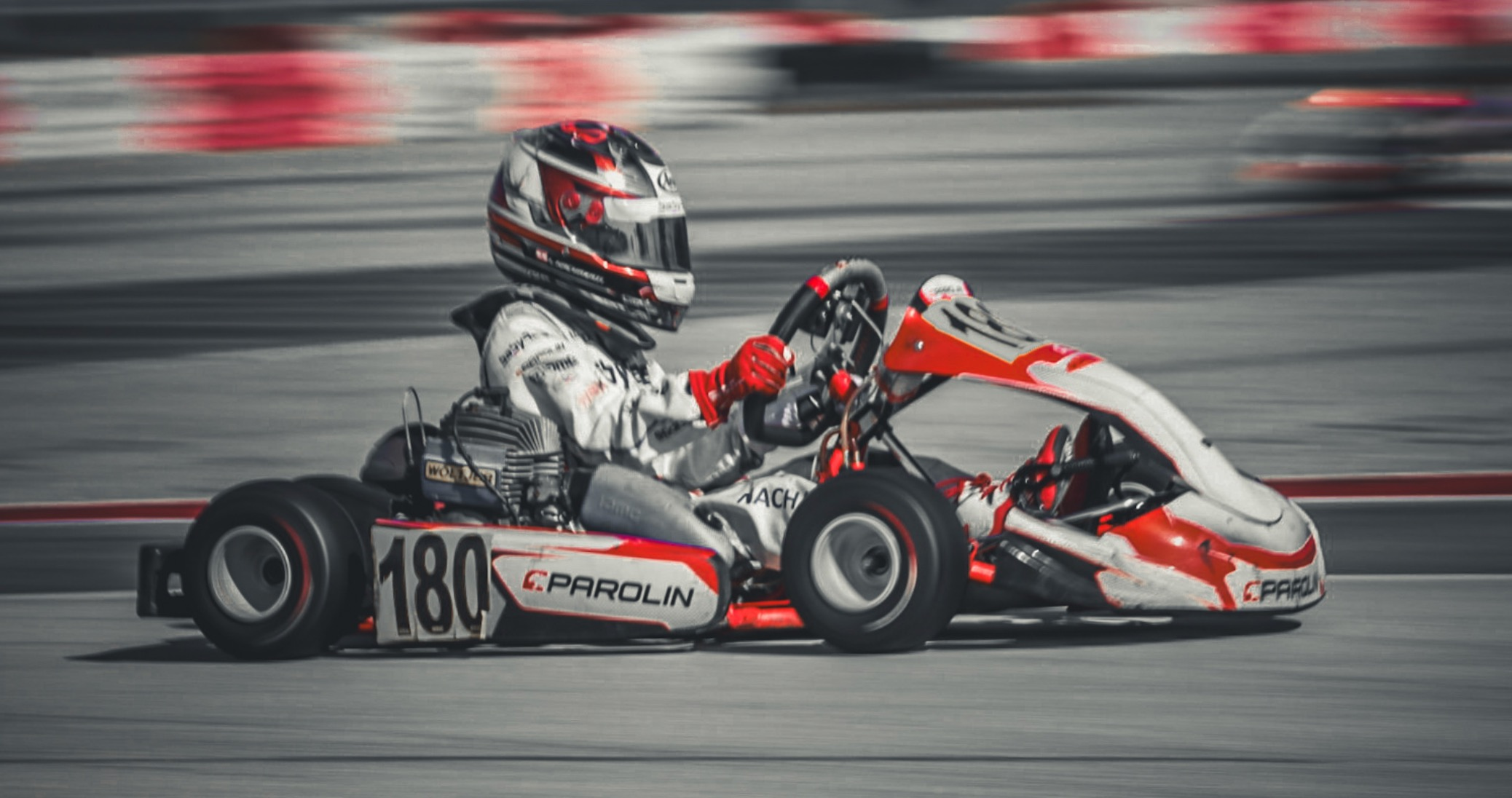

In January 2025, Nachawati finished in first place in the SuperKarts USA Winter Series in Orlando, Florida, after starting in 40th position. He was a top finisher and the fastest American at the WSK Final Cup in Lonato, Italy, in November 2024 In February 2025, Nachawati started the final race in pole position out of 78 drivers in the Mini GR.3 division. He also placed first in Heats A v. E and in A v. B, and placed fourth in Heat A v. D; in the February 2025 Lonato race. He holds track records for the fastest lap at North Texas Karters race track in two categories, Tag Cadet 2 and 206 Junior 1. In July 2025, he placed third at the SuperKarts USA ProTour SuperNats in New Castle Motor Sports Park in New Castle, Indiana. In August 2025, he won the U.S. Pro Kart Series (USPKS) at the New Castle Motor Sports Park in the mini swift category after qualifying for pole position.

His 2026 race schedule included events in Spain, Belgium, Italy, Sweden, and the U.S. At the FIA European Championship in La Conca, Italy, in April 2026, Nachawati qualified fifth in group 1, finishing five heats in second, fifth, seventh, and fourth, respectively. He finished eighth in the super heats and 26th in the final out of nearly 100 drivers. In the championship standings, Nachawati ranks 13th out of nearly 100 OKJ entrants, as the youngest highest ranked driver, the youngest ranked rookie and highest ranked American driver. He placed second in the Queen City Gambit in the OKN Junior Final on April 19, 2026.

At the 2026 WSK Euro Series in Cremona July 8-11, 2026, Nachawati placed consistently among the top 5 in the OKJ field. He was P2 in Heat 1, P3 in Heat 3, and P4 in Heat 3, earning P3 after the heats. He ranked P4 after the pre final and finished P21 in the final. He was the highest qualifier aged 11 in the field heading into the prefinal and final, and was among the youngest drivers in a competitive international OKJ field.

Season	Series	Position
2026	SKUSA Winter Tour X30 Round 1 SKUSA Winter Tour X30 Round 2 Queen City Gambit OKN Junior Final WSK Euro Series, Cremona, Qualifying WSK Euro Series, Cremona, Pre Final WSK Euro Series, Cremona, Final	7 6 2 5 4 21
2025	SuperKarts USA Super Nationals XVIII Miniswift US Pro Kart Series Miniswift SKUSA SummerNats Miniswift World Series of Karting Super Masters Lonato Miniswift Super Karts USA Winter Series Miniswift	6 1 3 5 1
2024	SKUSA SuperNationals XVII World Series of Karting Final Cup Lonato WSK Final Cub Mini GRU U10 SKUSA Winter Tour Miami	8 5 18 2
2023	SuperKarts USA Spring Nationals	3
