= Muro Leccese =

- Comune
- Città di Muro Leccese
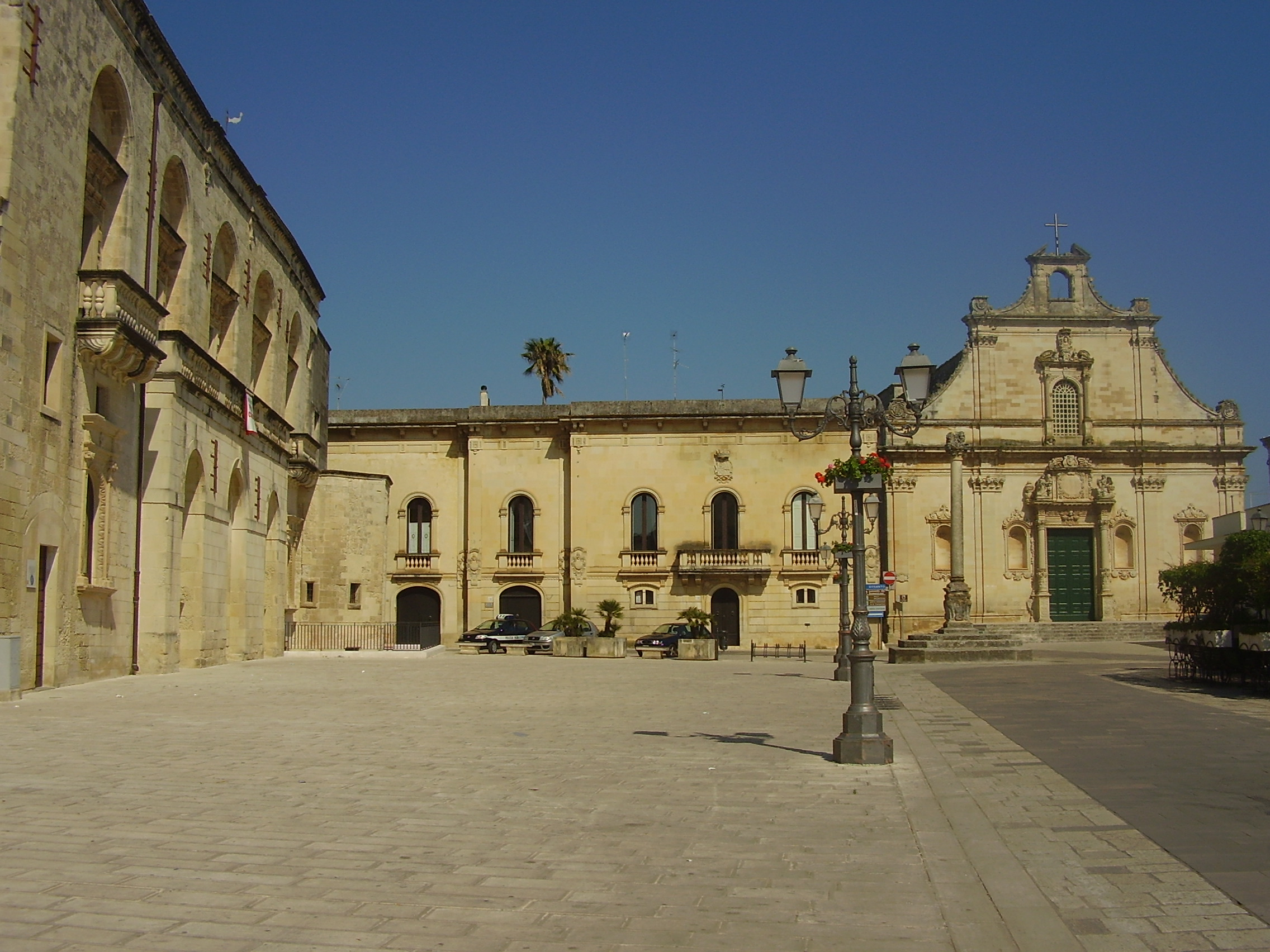
- Piazza del Popolo (main square)

- Coat of arms

- Location within Italy Location within Apulia
- Coordinates: 40°06′N 18°20′E
- Country: Italy
- Region: Apulia
- Province: Lecce (LE)

Government
  - Mayor: Antonio Lorenzo Donno (Uniti x Muro)

Area
  - Total: 16 km^{2} (6.2 sq mi)
- Elevation: 82 m (269 ft)

Population (31 December 2016)
  - Total: 4,948
  - Density: 310/km^{2} (800/sq mi)
- Demonym: Muresi
- Time zone: UTC+1 (CET)
  - Summer (DST): UTC+2 (CEST)
- Postal code: 73036
- Dialing code: 0836
- ISTAT code: 075051
- Patron saint: Saint Orontius of Lecce
- Saint day: 26 August
- Website: Official website

Muro Leccese is a town and comune of 4948 inhabitants (2016), in the province of Lecce, in the Apulia region of south-east Italy.

== Main sights ==
- Messapic walls (3rd-4th centuries BC)
