= OTK Kart Group =

Kart manufacturer from Italy

(Italy) OTK Kart Group
- Founded: 1958; 68 years ago, as Tony Kart S.n.c.
- Founder(s): Antonio Bosio
- Base: Prevalle, Lombardy, Italy
- Team principal(s): Roberto Robazzi (Chairman); Tony Kart Racing Team; Giacomo Aliprandi; Marco Ardigò; Francesco Celenta; Simo Puhakka; Alessandro Sferrella
- Drivers' Championships: CIK-FIA World Championship: 35; CIK-FIA World Cup: 14; CIK-FIA International Super Cup: 3; CIK-FIA European Championship: 44
- Website: tonykart.com

OTK Kart Group S.r.l., also known as Original Tony Kart (OTK), is a go-kart manufacturer based in Prevalle, Lombardy, Italy. Founded in 1958, OTK has won 35 CIK-FIA World Championships between 1986 and 2023 with its Tony Kart, Vortex, FA Kart, Kosmic, and Exprit brands.

With 35 titles, OTK is the second-most successful chassis manufacturer in the history of the World Championship, behind CRG. Across its 68-year existence, OTK has also won 14 CIK-FIA World Cups, three CIK-FIA International Super Cups, and 44 CIK-FIA European Championships. Notable World Champions on OTK machinery include multiple-time winners Davide Forè and Marco Ardigò, as well as Formula One drivers Jarno Trulli, Lando Norris, and Logan Sargeant.

== History ==
Tony Kart S.n.c. was founded in 1958 by Antonio "Tony" Bosio (23 February 1923 – 12 June 2015) in Prevalle, Lombardy, Italy. Bosio's craftsmanship was admired by drivers, who frequently visited his workshop. In 1965, Bosio built a special Tony Kart based on other land speed record designs with a 100 cc Parilla engine; at Monza, driver Livio Bolis set a record speed for a go-kart of 214.286 km/h (133.151 mph). Bosio also collaborated with the Italian Winter Sports Federation (FISI) on the construction of bobsleighs. His work was credited with several innovations in kart design, such as the "floating" brake caliper.

Tony Kart chassis were originally painted Savoy blue before switching to Tony Kart Green in 1983, following the purchase of the company by Roberto Robazzi and Carlo Cancarini. Powered by a Pavesi engine, Fabrizio Giovanardi took Tony Kart's first CIK-FIA World Championship three years later, winning the Formula C (FC) gearbox class. Under control of the Robazzi family, Tony Kart continued to dominate throughout the "Golden Era" of the 1980s and 1990s, establishing itself as the second-most successful chassis brand in World Championship history behind CRG. Several Formula One prodigies featured in Tony Kart machinery throughout this period, including Michael Schumacher, Ralf Schumacher, Jarno Trulli, Sebastian Vettel, and Lucas di Grassi.

OTK expanded beyond the Tony Kart brand in the mid-1990s. In 1995, it founded Vortex Engines, evolving Tony Kart into a factory team. The following year, it established the Kosmic Kart brand and, throughout the 2000s, established Redspeed Kart and Exprit Kart, as well as the Trulli—the first collaborative chassis with a Formula One driver. From 2009 to 2020, OTK partnered with two-time Formula One World Drivers' Champion Fernando Alonso on the FA Kart chassis. It later established the LN Kart brand with Lando Norris in 2021 and CS55 Racing with Carlos Sainz Jr. in 2024. In 2020, OTK acquired Gillard—the only British brand to win a non-superkart World Championship—and established EOS Racing Kart. OTK has operated factory-backed teams with the Tony Kart, Kosmic, and Exprit brands.

A 70% stake in OTK was acquired by QCapital and BIC Capital in 2022, supported by Crédit Agricole Italia, with the Robazzi family retaining 30% and strategic control. By 2023, OTK generated over 90% of its sales outside of Italy, with subsidiaries located in the United States, Japan, and Singapore, utilising over 130 distributors in 70 countries with €45 million in revenue. In 2023, OTK acquired Vega Tyres, which produced over one million tyres per year, representing 40% of the competitive tyre market. Two years later, it merged with TM Kart, an engine manufacturer with 19 World Championships, 15 of which were in the gearbox categories; the Flenghi family of TM subsequently joined the ownership group of OTK. It further strengthened partnerships with OMP Racing and Hitech Grand Prix throughout the mid-2020s, the latter following their collaboration with KTR in Formula Renault 2.0.

== Facilities ==
OTK operates a 17,000 m^{2} (180,000 sq ft) factory in Prevalle, where it produces all its chassis and engines under various brands. The karts are frequently tested at South Garda Karting in nearby Lonato del Garda.

== Chassis ==
=== Brands ===
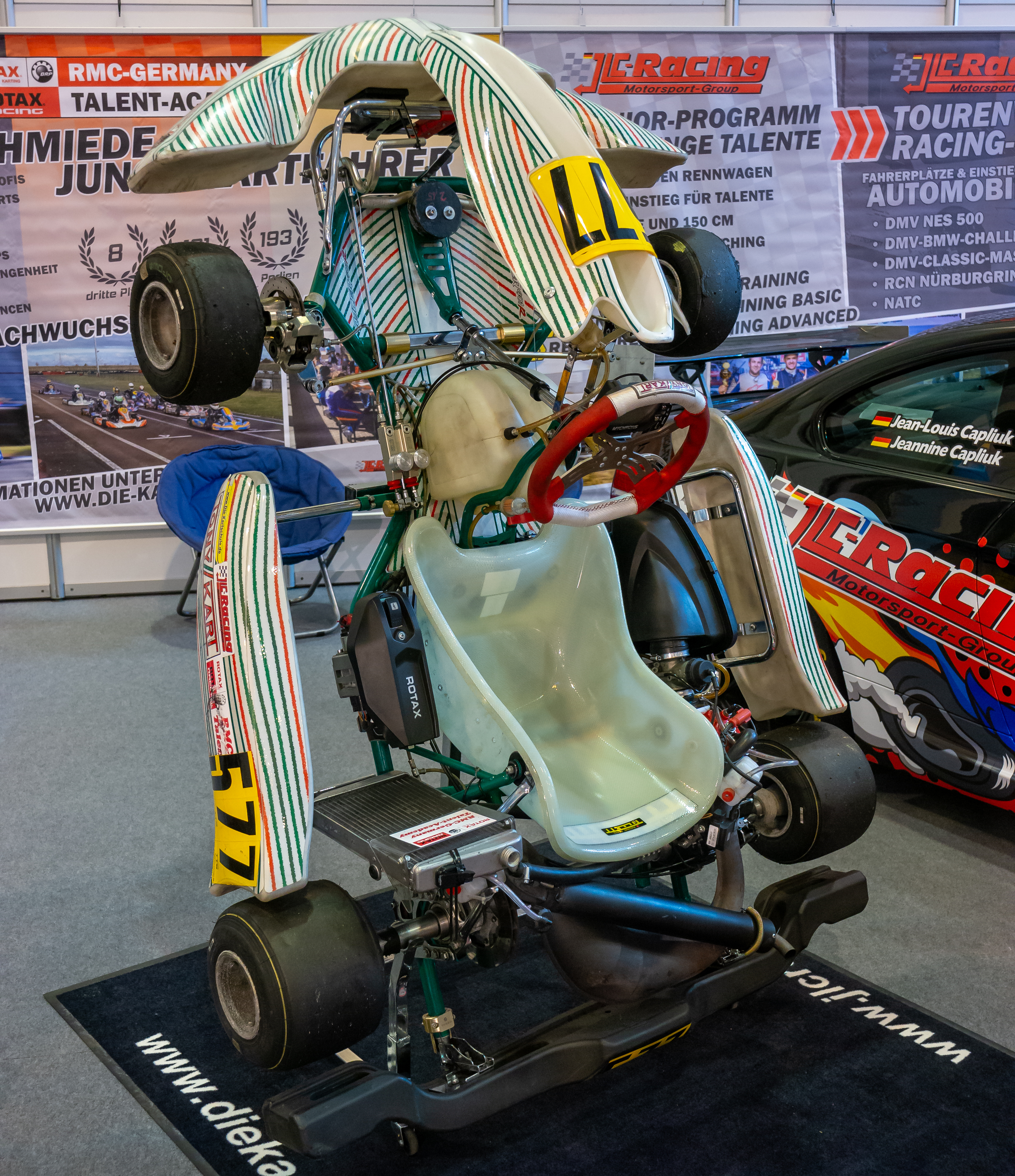
A Tony Kart chassis on display at the Essen Motor Show in 2023

- Tony Kart (1958–present)
- Kosmic (1996–present)
- Redspeed (2004–present)
- Exprit (2009–present)
- EOS (2020–present)
- Gillard (2020–present; acquisition)
- LN (2021–present) (Note: Collaboration with Lando Norris.)
- CS55 (2024–present) (Note: Collaboration with Carlos Sainz Jr.)

Former

- Trulli (1997–2003) (Note: Collaboration with Jarno Trulli.)
- FA Kart (2009–2020) (Note: Collaboration with Fernando Alonso.)

== Engines ==
=== Vortex Engines ===
Vortex Engines is the engine division of OTK. Founded in 1995, Vortex operate the ROK line of engines, which are contested in single-manufacturer disciplines worldwide.

=== TM Kart ===
In 2025, OTK merged with TM Kart, an engine manufacturer with 19 World Championships, 15 of which were in the gearbox categories.

== Tyres ==
During the pre-2012 open tyre era, Tony Kart were primarily partnered with Bridgestone. Of its 16 World Championships during the era, 14 were won on Bridgestone tyres, with one title on Vega tyres and another on Dunlop tyres.

=== Vega Tyres ===
In 2023, OTK acquired Vega Tyres, which produces over one million tyres per year, representing 40% of the competitive tyre market. Vega was founded in 1976 by Sergio Mantese in Saronno, Lombardy, Italy, and its tyres were used to win six World Championships throughout the open era.

== World Championships ==
OTK has won 35 CIK-FIA World Championships—23 with Tony Kart chassis, four with FA Kart chassis, five with Kosmic chassis, and three with Exprit chassis; 24 of which were with Vortex engines—since the inaugural edition in 1964:

CIK-FIA World Championships won by OTK chassis
#	Class	Year	Chassis	Engine	Tyres	Driver
1	FC	1986	Tony Kart	Pavesi	B	(Italy) Fabrizio Giovanardi
2	FA	1991	Tony Kart (2)	Rotax	B	(Italy) Alessandro Manetti
3	FA	1992	Tony Kart (3)	Rotax	V	(Italy) Nicola Gianniberti
4	FC	1994	Tony Kart (4)	Pavesi	D	(Italy) Jarno Trulli
5	FA	1995	Tony Kart (5)	Italsistem	B	(Brazil) Gastão Fráguas
6	FA	1996	Tony Kart (6)	Vortex	B	(France) Jean-Christophe Ravier
7	FSA	1996	Tony Kart (7)	Vortex	B	(Sweden) Johnny Mislijevic
8	FA	1997	Tony Kart (8)	Vortex	B	(Australia) James Courtney
9	FA	1998	Tony Kart (9)	Vortex	B	(Brazil) Ruben Carrapatoso
10	FSA	1998	Tony Kart (10)	Vortex	B	(Italy) Davide Forè
11	FA	1999	Tony Kart (11)	Vortex	B	(France) Franck Perera
12	FSA	2000	Tony Kart (12)	Vortex	B	(Italy) Davide Forè (2)
13	FA	2004	Tony Kart (13)	Vortex	B	(Italy) Davide Forè (3)
14	FA	2006	Tony Kart (14)	Vortex	B	(Italy) Davide Forè (4)
15	KF1	2007	Tony Kart (15)	Vortex	B	(Italy) Marco Ardigò
16	KF1	2008	Tony Kart (16)	Vortex	B	(Italy) Marco Ardigò (2)
17	KF1	2012	Tony Kart (17)	Vortex	B	(Italy) Flavio Camponeschi
18	KF-J	2013	Tony Kart (18)	Parilla	LC	(Italy) Alessio Lorandi
19	KF-J	2014	FA Kart	Vortex	V	(United Kingdom) Enaam Ahmed
20	KF	2014	FA Kart (2)	Vortex	D	(United Kingdom) Lando Norris
21	KZ	2014	Tony Kart (19)	Vortex	B	(Italy) Marco Ardigò (3)
22	KF-J	2015	FA Kart (3)	Vortex	LC	(United States) Logan Sargeant
23	KF	2015	Kosmic	Vortex	V	(Poland) Karol Basz
24	OK-J	2016	Kosmic (2)	Parilla	V	(France) Victor Martins
25	OK-J	2017	Exprit	TM	LC	(United Kingdom) Dexter Patterson
26	KZ	2018	Kosmic (3)	Vortex	LC	(Czech Republic) Patrik Hájek
27	OK-J	2018	Kosmic (4)	Parilla	V	(France) Victor Bernier
28	OK-J	2019	FA Kart (4)	Vortex	LC	(Netherlands) Thomas ten Brinke
29	OK-J	2020	Kosmic (5)	Vortex	MG	(United Kingdom) Freddie Slater
30	OK	2020	Tony Kart (20)	Vortex	LC	(United Kingdom) Callum Bradshaw
31	KZ	2021	Tony Kart (21)	Vortex	MG	(Sweden) Noah Milell
32	OK-J	2021	Exprit (2)	TM	MG	(Japan) Kean Nakamura-Berta
33	OK	2021	Tony Kart (22)	Vortex	MG	(Finland) Tuukka Taponen
34	OK-J	2022	Tony Kart (23)	Vortex	V	(Thailand) Enzo Tarnvanichkul
35	OK-J	2023	Exprit (3)	TM	V	(Belgium) Dries Van Langendonck

Tyres key
B	Bridgestone	LC	LeCont
C	Carlisle	MA	Maxxis
D	Dunlop	MG	MG Tires
G	Goodyear	M	Mojo
Invalid value for {{Tire}}	Komet	V	Vega

== See also ==
- Commission Internationale de Karting
- Kart racing
- List of kart manufacturers
