= Gillard (kart manufacturer) =

British company

- Industry: Manufacturing
- Founded: 1980; 45 years ago
- Founder: Tim Gillard
- Headquarters: Bishops Stortford, United Kingdom
- Owner: OTK Kart Group
- Website: gillardkart.com/index_eng.php

Gillard is a British kart manufacturer founded by Tim Gillard. In 2020, OTK Kart Group acquired Gillard and subsequently it became a brand of the Italian group which includes Tony Kart.

== History ==
Gillard was founded in 1980 manufacturing racing karts in Bishops Stortford, England. Advertising for early 100cc karts prepared by Tim Gillard appeared in karting magazines by December 1980. Gillard's karts were successful in Europe, notably with Peter de Bruijn's team. In 1998, Kimi Raikkonen joined de Bruijn for the European Formula Super A championship in which he finished 2nd overall, racing a Gillard machine.

Gillard chassis won the 2001 and 2004 KF1 European Kart Championships with Carlo van Dam and Nick de Bruijn respectively. In 2005 there was further success for Gillard with Oliver Oakes winning the 2005 FIA Karting World Championship and Michael Christensen winning the European Junior Championship. Formula One race winner Valtteri Bottas drove a Gillard in his 2005 and 2006 kart championship seasons. Further success for Gillard would follow in 2009 with Hayden McBride winning the Australian KF2 CIK Championship, and 2010 Joey Van Splunteren taking victory in the Rotax Eurochallenge.

Following acquisition in 2020, Tim Gillard retired from the company, and OTK Kart have continued to develop and manufacture models under the Gillard brand.
