= KZ (karting) =

International kart racing class

- Category: Kart racing
- Region: International
- Affiliations: CIK-FIA
- Inaugural season: 1974; 52 years ago (as Formula C)
- Drivers' champion: (Italy) Giuseppe Palomba; (World, 2024); (France) Mattéo Spirgel; (European, 2025)
- Teams' champion: (France) Sodi-TM; (World, 2024); (France) Sodi-TM; (European, 2025)
- Official website: Official website

KZ is a kart racing class for drivers aged 15 and over, sanctioned by the CIK-FIA. Described as "the [Formula One] of karting", KZ is the primary gearbox class in FIA championships.

The class was originally called Formula C (FC), first introduced in 1974 at the European Championship as the first gearbox class in international kart racing. FC was contested at the World Championship from 1983 until 2000. In 2002—after 28 seasons of racing—FC was replaced by Super-ICC (S-ICC) and downgraded to World Cup status. In 2007, Super-ICC was replaced by KZ1 and renamed to KZ in 2013, when it returned to the World Championship.

KZ is contested as the primary gearbox class at the Karting World Championship and the Karting European Championship.

== History ==
=== Formula C (1974–2001) ===
In 1974, Formula C (FC) was introduced as a 125 cc gearbox class for the European Championship, the first of its kind. FC was first held at the World Championship in 1983, remaining there until 2000.

=== Super-ICC (2002–2006) ===
In 2002, Super-ICC (S-ICC) regulations replaced FC, being downgraded to World Cup status.

=== KZ1/KZ (2007–present) ===
KZ1 replaced S-ICC in 2007. In 2013, KZ1 was renamed to KZ, returning to the World Championship.

== Specification ==
=== KZ ===
There are eight main technical features of the KZ regulations, sharing the same specification as KZ2 except for chassis and brakes, which are open in KZ, as well as minimum weight:

- 125 cc direct-coupled, water-cooled two-stroke, mixed-lubrication engine.
- Valve inlet in the piston skirt.
- Carburettor with a maximum diameter of 30 mm.
- Manual clutch.
- Six-speed sequential gearbox.
- Front and rear brakes with hydraulic foot control.
- Premium tyres, medium gum compound.
- Minimum weight 170 kg, driver included.

Engines, chassis, bodywork, brakes and tyres are subject to the homologation system put in place by the CIK-FIA. Each year, the tyres and the fuel for each category, as well as the KZ and KZ2 carburettor, are chosen after a call for tenders.

== Reception ==
In 2024, the CIK-FIA mandated the use of Dunlop tyres in international KZ competition. Several drivers and teams criticised the move ahead of the following Karting European Championship, addressing concerns with their competitive performance.

== Champions ==
KZ has been contested at the European Championship since 1974 and the World Championship/World Cup since 1983.

Gianluca Beggio holds the record for most KZ World Championships, with five. Notable KZ World Champions include four-time Formula One World Drivers' Champion Max Verstappen and two-time World Touring Car Champion Gabriele Tarquini. Verstappen is the only driver to win a CIK-FIA gearbox championship and the Formula One World Drivers' Championship.

Gianfranco Baroni and Francesco Laudato hold the joint-record for most KZ European Championships, each with four.

=== By year ===
Key
Drivers
*	Driver has competed in Formula One		
†	Formula One World Drivers' Champion		
‡	FIA World Champion in an auto racing discipline		
Tyres
B	Bridgestone	L	LeCont
C	Carlisle	M	Maxxis
D	Dunlop	M	MG Tires
G	Goodyear	M	Mojo
K	Komet	V	Vega

Year	World Championship				European Championship				Year
Year	World Champion (Note: Italics indicates years contested as a World Cup, not an FIA World Championship: 2003–2012.)	Chassis	Engine	Tyres	European Champion	Chassis	Engine	Tyres	Year
1974	FC regulations created for the European Championship								1974
1974	Not held				(Netherlands) Aad van Daalen	(Netherlands) Landia	(Japan) Yamaha		1974
1975	Not held				(Netherlands) Ben van Velzen	(Germany) Mach1	(Japan) Yamaha		1975
1976	Not held				(Italy) Gianfranco Baroni	(Italy) All Kart	(United Kingdom) BMC		1976
1977	Not held				(Italy) Gianfranco Baroni (2)	(Italy) All Kart	(United Kingdom) BMC		1977
1978	Not held				(Italy) Gianfranco Baroni (3)	(Italy) All Kart	(United Kingdom) BMC		1978
1979	Not held				(Italy) Giancarlo Vanaria	(Italy) Kalì Kart	(Italy) Pavesi	B	1979
1980	Not held				(Germany) Frank Leuze	(Germany) Mach1	(Germany) KZH		1980
1981	Not held				(Italy) Gianfranco Baroni (4)	(Italy) Birel	(United Kingdom) BMC		1981
1982	Not held				(Italy) Alessandro Piccini	(Italy) All Kart	(Italy) Morbidelli		1982
1983	FC mandated at the World Championship and replaced by ICC at the European Championship								1983
1983	(Italy) Gianni Mazzola	(Italy) Birel	(Italy) Balen	D	Not held				1983
1984	(Italy) Gabriele Tarquini‡	(Italy) Kalì Kart	(Italy) Balen	D	Not held				1984
1985	(Italy) Piermario Cantoni	(Italy) Kalì Kart	(Italy) Balen	D	Not held				1985
1986	(Italy) Fabrizio Giovanardi	(Italy) Tony Kart	(Italy) Pavesi	B	Not held				1986
1987	(Italy) Alessandro Piccini	(Italy) DAP	(Italy) Pavesi	V	Not held				1987
1988	(Sweden) Peter Rydell	(Italy) All Kart	(Italy) Pavesi	D	Not held				1988
1989	(Italy) Gianluca Giorgi	(Italy) Kalì Kart	(Italy) Kalì Kart	D	Not held				1989
1990	(Italy) Alessandro Piccini (2)	(Italy) Birel	(Italy) Pavesi	B	Not held				1990
1991	(Italy) Alessandro Piccini (3)	(Italy) Birel	(Italy) Pavesi	D	Not held				1991
1992	(Italy) Danilo Rossi	(Italy) Kalì Kart	(Italy) Pavesi	D	Not held				1992
1993	(Italy) Alessandro Piccini (4)	(Italy) Kalì Kart	(Italy) Pavesi	D	Not held				1993
1994	(Italy) Jarno Trulli*	(Italy) Tony Kart	(Italy) Pavesi	D	Not held				1994
1995	(Italy) Gianluca Beggio	(Italy) Biesse	(Italy) TM	V	Not held				1995
1996	FC mandated at the European Championship								1996
1996	(Italy) Gianluca Beggio (2)	(Italy) Biesse	(Italy) TM	B	(Italy) Alessandro Piccini (2)	(Italy) CRG	(Italy) Pavesi	B	1996
1997	(Italy) Gianluca Beggio (3)	(Italy) Birel	(Italy) TM	B	(Italy) Gianluca Beggio	(Italy) Birel	(Italy) TM	B	1997
1998	(Italy) Gianluca Beggio (4)	(Italy) Birel	(Italy) TM	B	(Italy) Gianluca Beggio (2)	(Italy) Birel	(Italy) TM	B	1998
1999	(Italy) Francesco Laudato	(Italy) Birel	(Italy) TM	D	(Italy) Ronnie Quintarelli	(Italy) Tony Kart	(Italy) Vortex	B	1999
2000	(Italy) Gianluca Beggio (5)	(Italy) Birel	(Italy) TM	B	(Italy) Francesco Laudato	(Italy) Birel	(Italy) TM	B	2000
2001	FC removed from the World Championship								2001
2001	Not held				(Italy) Alessandro Piccini (3)	(Italy) CRG	(Italy) TM	B	2001
2002 (Note: The 2002 European Championship was shared ex-aequo by Francesco Laudato and Sauro Cesetti, who both scored 86 points. Some sources have Laudato listed as the outright champion.)	FC replaced by S-ICC								2002
2002	Not held				(Italy) Francesco Laudato (2) (Italy) Sauro Cesetti	(Italy) Birel (Italy) Kosmic	(Italy) TM (Italy) Vortex	B B	2002
2003	S-ICC mandated at the World Cup								2003
2003	(Netherlands) Robert Dirks	(Italy) Birel	(Italy) TM	V	(Italy) Alessandro Manetti	(Italy) CRG	(Italy) Pavesi	D	2003
2004	(Italy) Ennio Gandolfi	(Italy) Birel	(Italy) TM	V	(Italy) Francesco Laudato (3)	(Italy) Birel	(Italy) TM	V	2004
2005	(Italy) Francesco Laudato	(Italy) Birel	(Italy) TM	V	(Italy) Francesco Laudato (4)	(Italy) Birel	(Italy) TM	V	2005
2006	(Italy) Davide Forè	(Italy) Tony Kart	(Italy) Vortex	V	(Italy) Roberto Toninelli	(Italy) BRM	(Italy) TM	V	2006
2007	S-ICC replaced by KZ1								2007
2007	(Belgium) Jonathan Thonon	(Italy) CRG	(Italy) Maxter	D	(Italy) Alessandro Manetti (2)	(Italy) Intrepid	(Italy) TM	D	2007
2008	(Belgium) Jonathan Thonon (2)	(Italy) CRG	(Italy) Maxter	D	(Belgium) Jonathan Thonon	(Italy) CRG	(Italy) Maxter	D	2008
2009	(Belgium) Jonathan Thonon (3)	(Italy) CRG	(Italy) Maxter	D	(Netherlands) Bas Lammers	(Italy) Intrepid	(Italy) TM	D	2009
2010	(Netherlands) Bas Lammers	(Italy) Intrepid	(Italy) TM	D	(Netherlands) Bas Lammers (2)	(Italy) Intrepid	(Italy) TM	D	2010
2011	(Belgium) Jonathan Thonon (4)	(Italy) CRG	(Italy) Maxter	D	(Italy) Paolo De Conto	(Italy) Energy Corse	(Italy) TM	D	2011
2012	(Netherlands) Bas Lammers (2)	(Czech Republic) Praga	(Italy) Parilla	B	(Netherlands) Jorrit Pex	(Italy) CRG	(Italy) TM	B	2012
2013	KZ1 renamed to KZ and upgraded to World Championship status								2013
2013	(Netherlands) Max Verstappen†	(Italy) CRG	(Italy) TM	B	(Netherlands) Max Verstappen†	(Italy) CRG	(Italy) TM	B	2013
2014	(Italy) Marco Ardigò	(Italy) Tony Kart	(Italy) Vortex	B	(Belgium) Rick Dreezen	(Italy) Zanardi	(Italy) Parilla	B	2014
2015	(Netherlands) Jorrit Pex	(Italy) CRG	(Italy) TM	B	(Italy) Flavio Camponeschi	(Italy) Tony Kart	(Italy) Vortex	B	2015
2016	(Italy) Paolo De Conto	(Italy) CRG	(Italy) TM	V	(Italy) Marco Ardigò	(Italy) Tony Kart	(Italy) TM	V	2016
2017	(Italy) Paolo De Conto (2)	(Italy) CRG	(Italy) TM	V	(Italy) Paolo De Conto (2)	(Italy) CRG	(Italy) TM	B	2017
2018	(Czech Republic) Patrik Hájek	(Italy) Kosmic	(Italy) Vortex	L	(Netherlands) Jorrit Pex (2)	(Italy) CRG	(Italy) TM	L	2018
2019	(Netherlands) Marijn Kremers	(Italy) Birel ART	(Italy) TM	B	(Netherlands) Jorrit Pex (3)	(Italy) Kart Republic	(Italy) TM	B	2019
2020	(France) Jérémy Iglesias	(United Kingdom) Formula K	(Italy) TM	V	(Netherlands) Marijn Kremers	(Italy) Ricciardo	(Italy) TM	V	2020
2021	(Sweden) Noah Milell	(Italy) Tony Kart	(Italy) Vortex	M	(Italy) Riccardo Longhi	(Italy) Birel ART	(Italy) TM	M	2021
2022	(Sweden) Viktor Gustafsson	(Italy) CRG	(Italy) TM	L	(Italy) Paolo Ippolito	(Italy) Kart Republic	(Italy) IAME	L	2022
2023	(Italy) Paolo Ippolito	(Italy) Kart Republic	(Italy) IAME	L	(Italy) Danilo Albanese	(Italy) Kart Republic	(Italy) IAME	L	2023
2024	(Italy) Giuseppe Palomba	(France) Sodi	(Italy) TM	D	(Italy) Lorenzo Travisanutto	(Italy) Parolin	(Italy) TM	D	2024
Year	World Champion	Chassis	Engine	Tyres	European Champion	Chassis	Engine	Tyres	Year
Year	World Championship				European Championship				Year

=== By driver ===
table

== See also ==
- KZ2 – the secondary gearbox class
- KF1, the top level of karting
- OK – the primary direct-drive class
- OK-Junior – the junior direct-drive class
- Superkart – 250cc kart racing class
- CIK-FIA
- List of kart racing championships
