= KF1 =

Karting category

KF1 was the top level of karting. It is open to drivers aged 15 and up.

This class used to be called Formula A and has changed since January 2007 when CIK-FIA decided to replace the 100 cc water-cooled two-stroke engines with 125 cc Touch-and-Go (TaG) water-cooled two-stroke engines (KF type). The engines produce 40 hp (30 kW). KF1 class karts use hand-operated front brakes. The front brakes are activated by a Lever. Chassis and engines must be approved by the CIK-FIA. Minimum weight is 160 kg (350 lb) with driver.

Karts are equipped with an electric starter and clutch. The engine rpm is limited at 16,000 rpm. Top speed is around 140 km/h (87 mph), depending on circuits.

As the Formula One of karting, KF1 has high costs and drivers typically spend $100,000 per year to compete. It is needed to finance much practice, training and testing, team costs, chassis and engines, tires and parts, and traveling. Most teams in this category are factory teams or financed by chassis or engine manufacturers.

Drivers typically compete in national competitions, then move into international racing in the KF3 or KF2 classes where they must finish in the top 34 to qualify to compete in KF1. Once in KF1, drivers either stay for a few years to improve their skills before moving on to car racing, or they become professional kart racers and race in KF1 until they retire. Many successful racing drivers and all current F1 drivers started their careers in karts, and KF1 has been home to rivalries involving the likes of Lewis Hamilton, Nico Rosberg and Robert Kubica in the early 2000s, as well as Max Verstappen and Nicklas Nielsen in more recent times. The class also played a leading role in the so-called golden era of karting in the 80s and 90s.

There is a European KF1 Championship, a World Cup, and a World Championship, the sport's main event. Since 2016 the new generation of Original Karts (OK) machines have taken over from the old KF engines.

== Champions ==
European Champions since 2000
Year	Driver	Chassis	Engine	Tyres
2000	(United Kingdom) Lewis Hamilton	CRG	Parilla	Bridgestone
2001	(Netherlands) Carlo van Dam	Gillard	Parilla	Bridgestone
2002	(Germany) David Hemkemeyer	Mach 1	KZH	Bridgestone
2003	(Netherlands) Bas Lammers	Swiss Hutless	Vortex	Bridgestone
2004	(Netherlands) Nick de Bruijn	Gillard	Parilla	Bridgestone
2005	(Italy) Marco Ardigò	Tony Kart	Vortex	Bridgestone
2006	(Italy) Marco Ardigò	Tony Kart	Vortex	Bridgestone
2007	(Italy) Marco Ardigò	Tony Kart	Vortex	Bridgestone
2008	(Italy) Marco Ardigò	Tony Kart	Vortex	Bridgestone
2009	(Finland) Aaro Vainio	Maranello	Maxter	Bridgestone
2010				
2011	(Thailand) Alexander Albon	Intrepid	TM	Bridgestone
2012	(United Kingdom) Ben Barnicoat	ART GP	Parilla	Vega
2013	(Netherlands) Max Verstappen	CRG	TM	Vega
2014	(United Kingdom) Callum Ilott	Zanardi	Parilla	Bridgestone
2015	(United Kingdom) Ben Hanley	Mad-Croc	TM	Vega
2016	(Spain) Pedro Hiltbrand	CRG	Parilla	Vega
2017	(Morocco) Sami Taoufik	FA Kart	Vortex	LeCont
2018	(Germany) Hannes Janker	Kart Republic	Parilla	Bridgestone
2019	(Italy) Lorenzo Travisanutto	Kart Republic	Parilla	LeCont
2020	(Italy) Andrea Kimi Antonelli	Kart Republic	Parilla	LeCont
2021	(Italy) Andrea Kimi Antonelli	Kart Republic	Parilla	MG
2022	(Japan) Kean Nakamura-Berta	Kart Republic	Parilla	MG
2023	(Netherlands) René Lammers	Parolin	TM	MG

World Champions since 2003
Year	Driver	Chassis	Engine	Tyres
2003	(New Zealand) Wade Cunningham	CRG	Maxter	Bridgestone
2004	(Italy) Davide Forè	Tony Kart	Vortex	Bridgestone
2005	(United Kingdom) Oliver Oakes	Gillard	Parilla	Bridgestone
2006	(Italy) Davide Forè	Tony Kart	Vortex	Bridgestone
2007	(Italy) Marco Ardigò	Tony Kart	Vortex	Bridgestone
2008	(Italy) Marco Ardigò	Tony Kart	Vortex	Bridgestone
2009	(France) Arnaud Kozlinski	CRG	Maxter	Bridgestone
2010	(Netherlands) Nyck de Vries	Zanardi	Parilla	Dunlop
2011	(Netherlands) Nyck de Vries	Zanardi	Parilla	Bridgestone
2012	(Italy) Flavio Camponeschi	Tony Kart	Vortex	Bridgestone
2013	(United Kingdom) Tom Joyner	Zanardi	TM	Vega
2014	(United Kingdom) Lando Norris	FA Kart	Vortex	Bridgestone
2015	(Poland) Karol Basz	Kosmic	Vortex	Vega
2016	(Spain) Pedro Hiltbrand	CRG	Parilla	Vega
2017	(United Kingdom) Danny Keirle	Zanardi	Parilla	LeCont
2018	(Italy) Lorenzo Travisanutto	Kart Republic	Parilla	Bridgestone
2019	(Italy) Lorenzo Travisanutto	Kart Republic	Parilla	LeCont
2020	(United Kingdom) Callum Bradshaw	Tony Kart	Vortex	LeCont
2021	(Finland) Tuukka Taponen	Tony Kart	Vortex	MG
2022	(Brazil) Matheus Morgatto	Kart Republic	Parilla	MG
2023	(Russia) Kirill Kutskov	Kart Republic	IAME	MG

== See also ==
- KF2, a KF1 feeder series
- KF3, a KF1 and KF2 feeder series
- KZ1, the fastest KZ karting racing category
- KZ2, the second fastest KZ karting racing category
- Superkart, road racing with kart sized open-wheel cars
