= KZ2 =

Kart racing class

KZ2 is a kart racing class using 125 cc water-cooled two-stroke engines yielding about 52 hp (39 kW). The engines are equipped with a 6-speed gearbox. Z2 is the second fastest of the KZ karting racing categories, and technical regulations are similar to faster KZ1 except that in KZ2 the gearbox must be "hand-operated and exclusively mechanical without a servo system", as well as the use of medium tires. Both the engine and chassis must be approved by the CIK-FIA racing governing commission. The class is open to drivers aged 15 years and up with the minimum weight being 175 kg, this includes the kart and driver.

The KZ2 class used to be called Intercontinental C (ICC) and was renamed by the CIK-FIA in January 2007.

The KZ2 class is run in both national and continental championships and is popular in Europe and the USA. In the UK, since the beginning of 2019, The Motorsport UK run championship is the only British Championship and runs to CIK regulations with Le Cont tyres. The NKF Super 4 series continues as KZ UK with a minimum weight of 180 kg but has no championship status.

== CIK-FIA Karting International Supercup ==
Year	Champion	Chassis / Engine / Tire	Class
2013	(France) Dorian Boccolacci	Energy Corse / TM / Bridgestone	KZ2 Supercup
2014	(Netherlands) Ryan Van Der Burgt	DR / Modena / Bridgestone	KZ2 Supercup
2015	(France) Thomas Laurent	Tony Kart / Vortex / LeCont	KZ2 Supercup
2016	(Spain) Pedro Hiltbrand	CRG / Maxter / Vega	KZ2 Supercup
2017	(Italy) Alex Irlando	Sodikart / TM / Bridgestone	KZ2 Supercup
2018	(Italy) Matteo Viganò	Tony Kart / Vortex / Bridgestone	KZ2 Supercup
2019	(France) Emilien Denner	Sodikart / TM / Bridgestone	KZ2 Supercup
2020	(Italy) Simone Cunati	Birel / TM / Vega	KZ2 Supercup
2021	(Italy) Lorenzo Travisanutto	Parolin / TM / MG	KZ2 Supercup
2022	(France) Arthur Carbonnel	CRG / TM / LeCont	KZ2 Supercup

== CIK-FIA European Championships ==
Year	European Champion	Chassis / Engine / Tire	Class
2007	(Netherlands) Thomas Knopper	PCR / TM / Dunlop	KZ2
2008	(France) Tony Lavanant	Energy Corse / TM / Bridgestone	KZ2
2009	(Italy) Angelo Lombardo	Tony Kart / Vortex / Bridgestone	KZ2
2010	(Italy) Paolo De Conto	Energy Corse / TM / Vega	KZ2
2011	(Italy) Fabian Federer	CRG / TM / Bridgestone	KZ2
2012	(Lithuania) Simas Juodvirsis	Energy Corse / TM / Vega	KZ2
2013	(Norway) Emil Antonsen	DR / TM / Bridgestone	KZ2
2014	(Italy) Andrea Dalè	CRG / Maxter / Bridgestone	KZ2
2015	(Sweden) Joel Johansson	Energy Corse / TM / LeCont	KZ2
2016	(Italy) Fabian Federer	CRG / TM / Bridgestone	KZ2
2017	(Germany) Leon Köhler	Tony Kart / Vortex / Vega	KZ2
2018	(France) Adrien Renaudin	Sodikart / TM / LeCont	KZ2
2019	(Sweden) Emil Skärås	Energy Corse / TM / Bridgestone	KZ2
2020	(Sweden) Victor Gustavsson	Birel / TM / Vega	KZ2
2021	(Italy) Giacomo Pollini	CRG / TM / MG	KZ2
2022	(France) Tom Leuillet	Birel / TM / LeCont	KZ2

== See also ==
- KF1, the top level of karting
- KF2, a KF1 feeder series
- KF3, a KF2 and KF1 feeder series
- KZ1, the fastest KZ karting racing category
- Superkart, road racing with kart sized open-wheel cars
