= Italian American Motor Engineering =

Italian kart engine manufacturer

IAME
- Industry: Engine manufacturing
- Founded: 1968
- Headquarters: Bergamo, Italy

Italian American Motor Engineering (IAME) is an Italian company specializing in manufacturing kart engines. It also produces engines for ultralight aircraft.

== History ==
Founded in 1968, it is the parent company of the "Parilla", "Komet" and "Sirio" brand names and is the largest kart engines manufacturer. Its factory is located in the province of Bergamo, Italy, near the city of Milan.

The company has won 25 Karting World Championships.

The manufacturer won the European Formula A championship in 2000 with Lewis Hamilton, in 2001 with Carlo Van Dam and in 2004 with Nick De Bruijn.

2005 and 2006 Formula One World Champion, Fernando Alonso, won the karting Junior World Cup in 1996 with a Parilla engine made by IAME.

F1 world champion Max Verstappen won the WSK Euro Series 2011 in an Parilla-powered CRG.

== Aircraft engines ==
Aircraft engines produced by the Komet Flight Motor division of IAME include:

- KFM 107 - 25 hp (19 kW) two cylinder, two stroke engine
- KFM 112M - 62 hp (46 kW) four cylinder, four stroke engine
