= Andrea Margutti Trophy =

International kart racing competition in Italy

Andrea Margutti Trophy Trofeo Andrea Margutti
- Category: Kart racing
- Region: International
- Affiliations: Parma Motorsport; Automobile Club d'Italia; CIK-FIA
- Inaugural season: 1990; 36 years ago
- Classes: KZ2, OK-N, OKN-J, Mini Gr.3, Mini U10
- Drivers' champion: (Italy) Cristian Bertuca; (KZ2, Birel ART–IAME); (Italy) Nicolas Marchesi; (OK-N, KR–TM); (Italy) Gioele Carrer; (OKN-J, EKS–Modena); (United Kingdom) Alfie Mair; (Mini Gr.3, Tony Kart–Vortex); (Italy) Zayne Burgess; (Mini U10, Parolin–LKE)
- Most titles: (Italy) Giancarlo Fisichella (4)
- Official website: trofeomargutti.com

The Andrea Margutti Trophy (Italian: Trofeo Andrea Margutti, pronounced [troˈfɛːo anˈdrɛːa marˈɡutti]), also known as the Trofeo Margutti or simply the Margutti, is a kart racing competition organised by Parma Motorsport and sanctioned by ACI Sport. Hosted annually since 1990, it is one of 11 competitions on the international kart racing calendar in CIK-FIA classes.

The event was founded in memory of the eponymous 14-year-old Italian kart racer, who died in the 1989 edition of the Torneo delle Industrie. Initially hosted at the Pista d'Oro until 1991, the Margutti soon moved to Parma, where it established itself as a world-leading competition during the "Golden Era" of the 1990s. Following the collapse of Parma in 2008, it moved to Castelletto for three editions before settling at Lonato in 2012. As of 2026, it is contested by over 300 drivers across five classes: KZ2, OK-N, OKN-J, Mini Gr.3, and Mini U10, with KZ2 featuring on the international calendar. The event was previously also contested in Italian American Motor Engineering (IAME) classes—X30 Senior and X30 Junior—as well as the primary CIK-FIA senior and junior classes.

The palmarès of the Andrea Margutti Trophy includes Formula One drivers Giancarlo Fisichella, André Lotterer (1995–1996, ICA-J), Robert Kubica (1999, ICA-J), Charles Pic (2005, ICA-J), Daniil Kvyat (2009, KF3), and Logan Sargeant (2012, 60 Mini); the former won a record four titles between 1990 and 1994 in FA and ICA. As of 2025, seven World Drivers' Champions have contested the event, (Note: Seven World Drivers' Champions have contested the Andrea Margutti Trophy, as of 2025: Jenson Button (1994–1997); Kimi Räikkönen (1998); Fernando Alonso (1995–1999); Nico Rosberg (1998–2000); Lewis Hamilton (1999–2000); Sebastian Vettel (2000–2001); and; Lando Norris (2013).) but none have finished on the podium. Lotterer is the only victor to progress to win an FIA World Championship in auto racing and Sophie Kumpen (1995, FA) is the only female driver to win a title.

== History ==
=== Background (1961–1989) ===
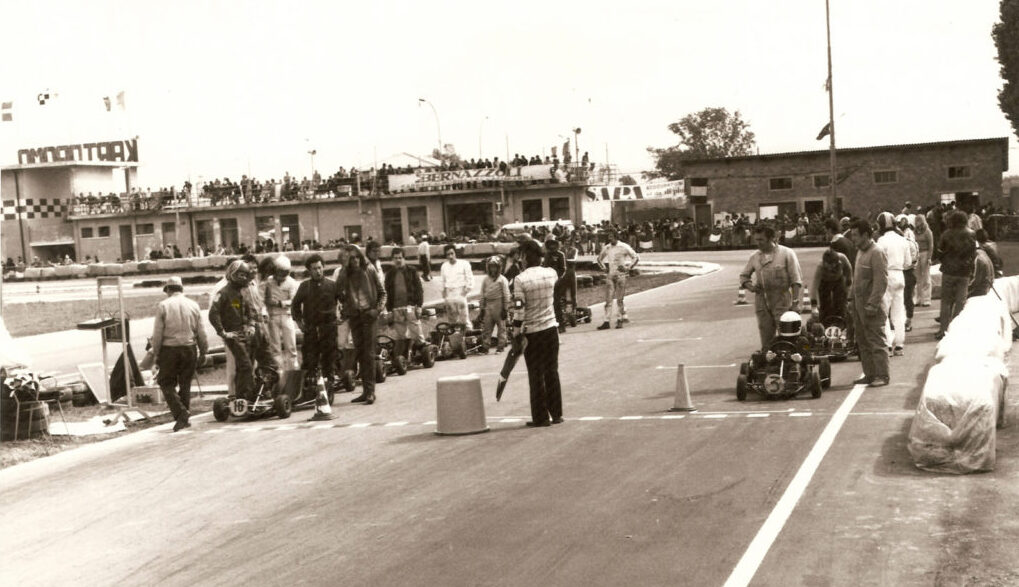
The Torneo delle Industrie was founded at Parma in 1971, the scene of 14-year-old Andrea Margutti's fatal accident in 1989.

The Parma Kartdrome, also known as the Pista San Pancrazio or Mondialpista di Fraore, was built in 1961 and inaugurated by the actors Fernandel and Gino Cervi, who were filming Don Camillo: Monsignor locally. The venue soon declared bankruptcy but, in 1967, the local Pellegrini family took management of the site and invested ITL 3 million (GBP 1,740; GBP 27,730 in 2025) in upgrading the venue. The owner and former bartender, Umberto Pellegrini, created the Torneo delle Industrie in 1971, which became one of the premier kart racing competitions in the world.

In 1988, Andrea Margutti (22 February 1975 – 14 October 1989) of Rome finished fifth in the Cadetti (lit. 'Cadet') class of the competition; he progressed to the Nazionale (lit. 'National') class the following year, during which his kart rolled in free practice and he sustained fatal internal haemorrhaging after his aorta ruptured, aged 14. Margutti had established himself as one of the leading talents in Italian motorsport and finished twenty-first in the CIK-FIA Junior World Cup at Zaragoza that year. His death was one of the most notable moments in kart racing history and marked a turning point in driver safety, as chest and rib protectors were popularised and became mandatory in FIA-sanctioned competition.

Now Andrea Margutti is up there, where, I'm sure, there are wonderful tracks, highly-prepared karts, and dazzling racing cars. Andrea is there, with his ever-present smile, and I'm sure he's competing for the corner entry with Villeneuve or De Angelis in a timeless race, with all those who, for this sport, have given the most precious gift granted by God to man: life...

— Luciano De Filippis, "Andrea Margutti", Vroomkart Italia (January 1990) Vol. 9

=== Early years at the Pista d'Oro (1990–1991) ===
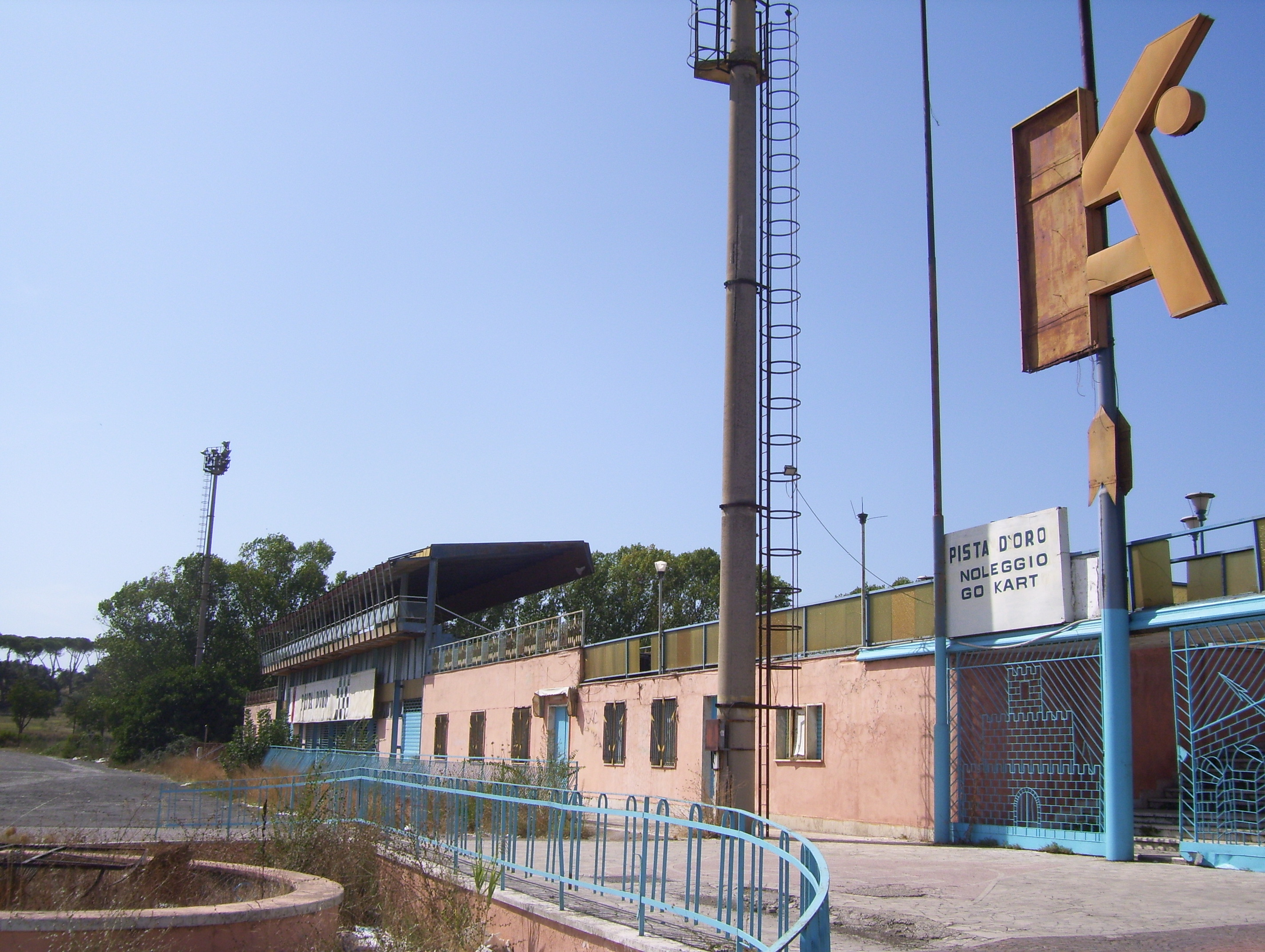
The Andrea Margutti Trophy was first held in 1990 at the Pista d'Oro in Rome.

The Andrea Margutti Trophy was founded in 1990, held as a national competition at the Pista d'Oro in Rome—the venue of the inaugural CIK-FIA World Championship—in memory of Margutti, who was local to the venue. A race scheduled there the day following his death was annulled when every competitor abandoned the event as a display of mourning. The event was organised within two months of his death by his family and several high-profile figures in the industry.

Andrea Belicchi of Parma won the premier Nazionale class in its inaugural year, while local driver Giancarlo Fisichella—who was a close friend of Margutti and kept a photograph of him in his helmet—was victorious in the secondary Intercontinental A (ICA) division. Fischella progressed to the Formula A (FA) class the following year, which replaced Nazionale, winning the competition for the second successive year as Calabria's Pietro Saitta claimed the ICA title. With over 160 entries in each of its inaugural editions and growing international attention, the characteristics of the Pista d'Oro were eventually deemed to ill-match the ambition of the organisers.

=== Parma (1992–2008) ===
==== 1992–1993: Move to Parma under the Pellegrini family ====
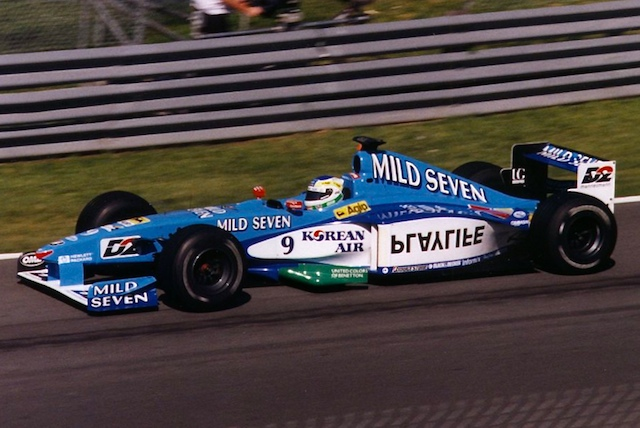
Giancarlo Fisichella won a record four titles between 1990 and 1994, becoming the first victor to enter Formula One in 1996.

After two editions, the event moved to Parma on request from Pellegrini and his family; Margutti's mother, Patrizia, had approached Pellegrini—who pleaded for "a chance to make up" for the 1989 accident—as Parma was one of Margutti's favourite circuits. By 1992, Parma had hosted four World Championships and established itself as the leading venue in international karting, which TKART described as a "temple" and contrasted its importance to the Circuit de Monaco in Formula One, Madison Square Garden in boxing, and Wimbledon in tennis.

The Junior Intercontinental A (ICA-J) category debuted that year for drivers under the age of 15, won by Bruno Balocco of Cuneo in 1992 and Ennio Gandolfi of Cremona in 1993, who both won the World Cup in those years. Fisichella proceeded to win a record four titles across its first five editions, missing out on the 1993 title in FA to Belicchi; he became the first champion to progress to Formula One in 1996. ICA, which was absent from the event on its Parmense debut, was won by Ascoli Piceno's Sauro Cesetti in 1993. Throughout the early years in Parma, the event grew substantially, with Vroomkart claiming its prestige had come to rival that of the World Championship.

==== 1994–2000: Prominence in international competition ====
Margutti changed my life. I am sad that the legendary Parma track disappeared, but it is good that Margutti Trophy continues in Lonato.

— André Lotterer discussing his "best kart race ever", the 1996 ICA-J final, with Vroomkart in 2023

The Margutti welcomed increased international competition from 1994 onwards, with over 100 foreign entrants and British driver Doug Bell winning the ICA-J title that year ahead of CIK-FIA Five Continents Cup winner Giorgio Pantano, who had been runner-up the year prior. Matteo Boscolo won in ICA, as Fisichella capitalised on a collision between Jarno Trulli and Risto Virtanen 200 m (660 ft) from the chequered flag to claim his fourth title in FA. Belgian prodigy Sophie Kumpen became the third woman in history to win a win a major international karting title with her victory in the premier FA class in 1995, (Note: Sophie Kumpen became the third woman in history to win a major international karting title, after: Susanna Raganelli, World Championship, 1966; and; Cathy Muller, European Championship, 100 cc, 1979.) beating the favoured two-time World Champion Jarno Trulli, as Massimo Del Col and André Lotterer claimed the secondary and junior titles, respectively; Jenson Button ended fifth in ICA. A record 308 drivers from 20 countries entered the competition that year, including 177 foreigners.

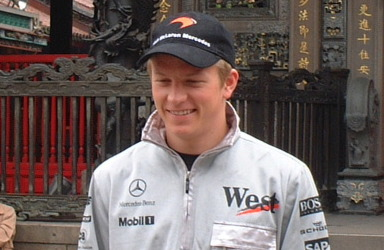
Kimi Räikkönen finished fourth in the FA final in 1998—the highest for a World Drivers' Champion.

Up to 1996—the founding year of the South Garda Winter Cup—the Margutti had been the opening event of the international karting calendar, where chassis and engine manufacturers would debut their seasonal challengers. Lotterer defended his title that year, later becoming the first victor to win an FIA World Championship in 2012, as Gianmaria Bruni finished seventh for the second successive year; 1994 World Champion Alessandro Manetti (FA) and Ioannis Antoniadis (ICA) won the senior divisions, the latter beating Vitantonio Liuzzi. Antonio García and 1995 World Champion Massimiliano Orsini claimed the FA class in the 1997 and 1998 editions, respectively, alongside Steve Molini and Giorgio Evangelisti—who qualified for the final via the repêchage and beat female talent Ketty D'Ambroso—in ICA, as well as Ben Benjamin and Stefano Fabi in ICA-J, the latter overcoming opposition from Marco Ardigò and Alessandro Pier Guidi. Finnish ICA Champion Kimi Räikkönen claimed fourth and Nico Rosberg seventh in the 1998 editions of FA and ICA-J, respectively.

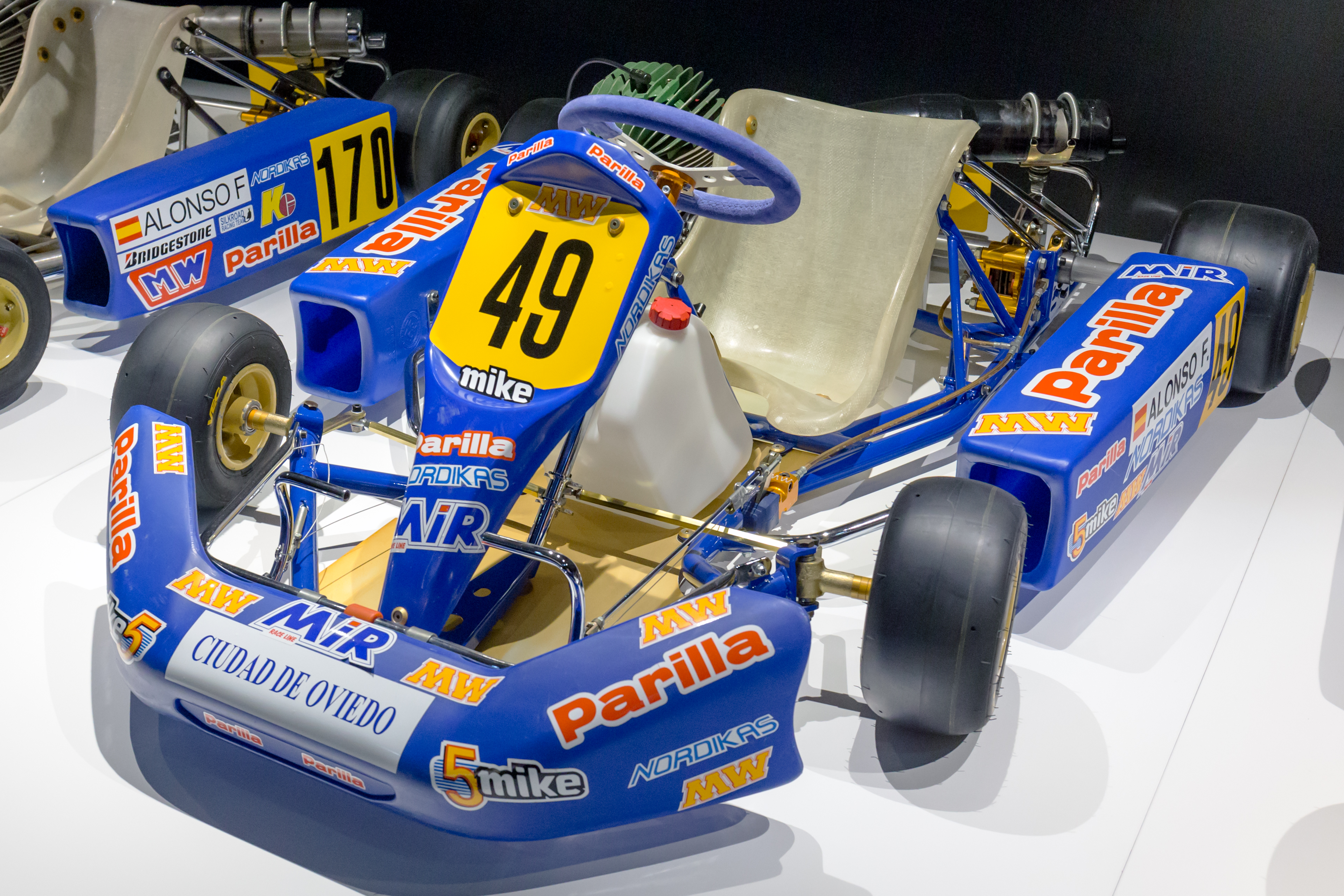
European Vice-Champion Fernando Alonso lost his lead during the FA final in 1999, finishing fifth.

Sauro Cesetti (FA), Michele Rugolo (ICA), and Robert Kubica (ICA-J) won the 1999 titles, as reigning European Vice-Champion Fernando Alonso claimed fifth in the former after Cesetti passed both him and four-time World Champion Gianluca Beggio for the lead. Lewis Hamilton made one of his first international karting starts in that year's event, later claiming he was racially abused by some French and Italian competitors. After three years of semi-independence as the Fedérération Mondiale de Karting (FMK), the CIK-FIA returned as a commission of the FIA, bringing the Margutti back to the FIA's sphere of influence. Toni Vilander claimed the FA title that year, with eventual World Cup and European Championship winner Hamilton claiming seventh. Stefano Proetto beat both Giacomo Ricci and Pier Guidi in ICA, with Pietro Ricci taking the junior crown, where Sebastian Vettel finished seventh. PCR's victories in the senior divisions with Vilander and Proetto saw them end the 20th century with a record-setting seven victories.

==== 2001–2008: Final years at Parma and start of KF era ====
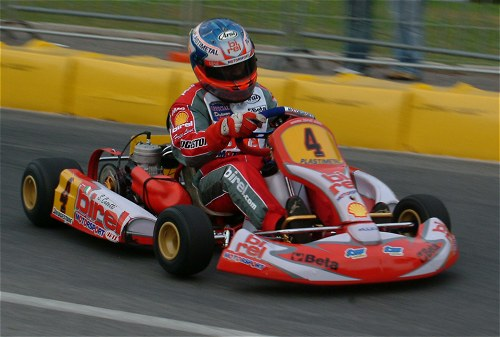
Sauro Cesetti won the FA title in 1999 and 2001, adding to his ICA victory in 1993.

Retaining the three-class system from 1993 into the 21st century, Cesetti claimed his second title in FA, as Jean-Philippe Guignet (ICA) and Miguel Gallego (ICA-J) claimed their first. Davide Gaggianesi beat Cesetti and Pastor Maldonado to the 2002 FA title, with Jérémy Iglesias victorious in the secondary class and Andrea Todisco in junior, the latter overcoming opposition from Sébastien Buemi. The 2003 edition saw a record 26 nationalities represented and the victories of: Carlo van Dam (FA) in a race of attrition; Oliver Oakes (ICA); and Dani Clos (ICA-J), who beat Miguel Molina and Jules Bianchi following an engine-related disqualification for initial last-lap victor Fred Martin-Dye. In 2004, FA was won by Ben Hanley ahead of two-time World Champion Davide Forè, ICA by a dominant Henkie Waldschmidt over Jon Lancaster, and ICA-J by Stefano Coletti; Bianchi repeated his third-place in the latter.

Heavy snowfall hit Parma during the 2005 edition, which took place amidst a Europe-wide cold wave where temperatures in Italy dropped to 17 °F (−8 °C). Edoardo Mortara capitalised on a collision between Forè and Cesetti to lead a Tony Kart 1–2–3 in FA, where Andrea Dalè dominated the ICA final and Charles Pic beat Roberto Merhi in ICA-J, the fourth successive victory in the class for Birel. The 2006 edition marked the final year of "Formula" regulations in international kart racing, when the victors were: reigning European Champion Marco Ardigò (FA), Marco Wittmann (ICA), and Nigel Moore (ICA-J). The Commission Internationale de Karting (CIK-FIA) introduced "KF" regulations to international competition in 2007, when the three classes—FA, ICA, and ICA-J—were replaced by KF1, KF2, and KF3, respectively. British driver Gary Catt proceeded to claim the KF1 title in back-to-back years, with Burkhard Maring and Zdeněk Groman victorious in KF2; the former won the title in a battle with Will Stevens and the latter after an engine failure for reigning European Champion Jack Harvey. The inaugural KF3 event was won by Harvey, followed by Ignazio D'Agosto in his 2008 battle with Aaro Vainio.

=== Castelletto (2009–2011) ===
The Margutti became an FIA Authorised Series and moved to Circuito Internazionale 7 Laghi Kart in Castelletto di Branduzzo, Lombardy, from 2009 to 2011, upon the permanent closure of Parma amidst the Great Recession, which was sold and decommissioned for a Decathlon franchise. TKART compared the demise of Parma to that of the original Wembley Stadium in 2000 and the Yankee Stadium in 2008. The event was initially set to move to Spain, at the Kartódromo Internacional Lucas Guerrero in Valencia, championed by two-time World Rally Champion Carlos Sainz Sr. The KF1 class—subjected to criticism for spiralling costs—was removed, with KF2 becoming the primary direct-drive competition. KZ2 was introduced as the new professional class, the first gearbox category to feature in the competition, which became an experimental event for kart manufacturers in the top divisions.

Jack Hawksworth was victorious on the gearbox debut while Brandon Maïsano claimed the senior class, with Antonio Giovinazzi in third, as Daniil Kvyat beat Nyck de Vries and Raffaele Marciello in junior—where Carlos Sainz Jr. matched his 2008 result of seventh. The 2009 edition notably saw the return of two former competitors—Fernando Alonso and 1999 ICA-J winner Robert Kubica—as chassis manufacturers with Tony Kart and Birel, respectively. Following an initial drop in participants that year, the 2010 edition saw entry figures return to the 200-mark. Persistent light rainfall hit Castelletto in 2010, when Jacob Nortoft claimed the KF2 title, with Loris Spinelli beating Esteban Ocon in KF3 and Simon Solgat victorious in KZ2. The 60 Mini category was introduced by ACI Sport as a 60 cc under-12 class that year, with the "60 Junior Trophy" won by Alessio Lorandi. The senior class was taken by Alain Valente in 2011, as Slavko Ivanovic claimed the junior title, Adam Janouš won in KZ2 with female prodigy Beitske Visser in sixth, and Marcu Dionisios in Mini.

=== Lonato (2012–present) ===
==== 2012–2019: Demise of KF regulations and the OK era ====
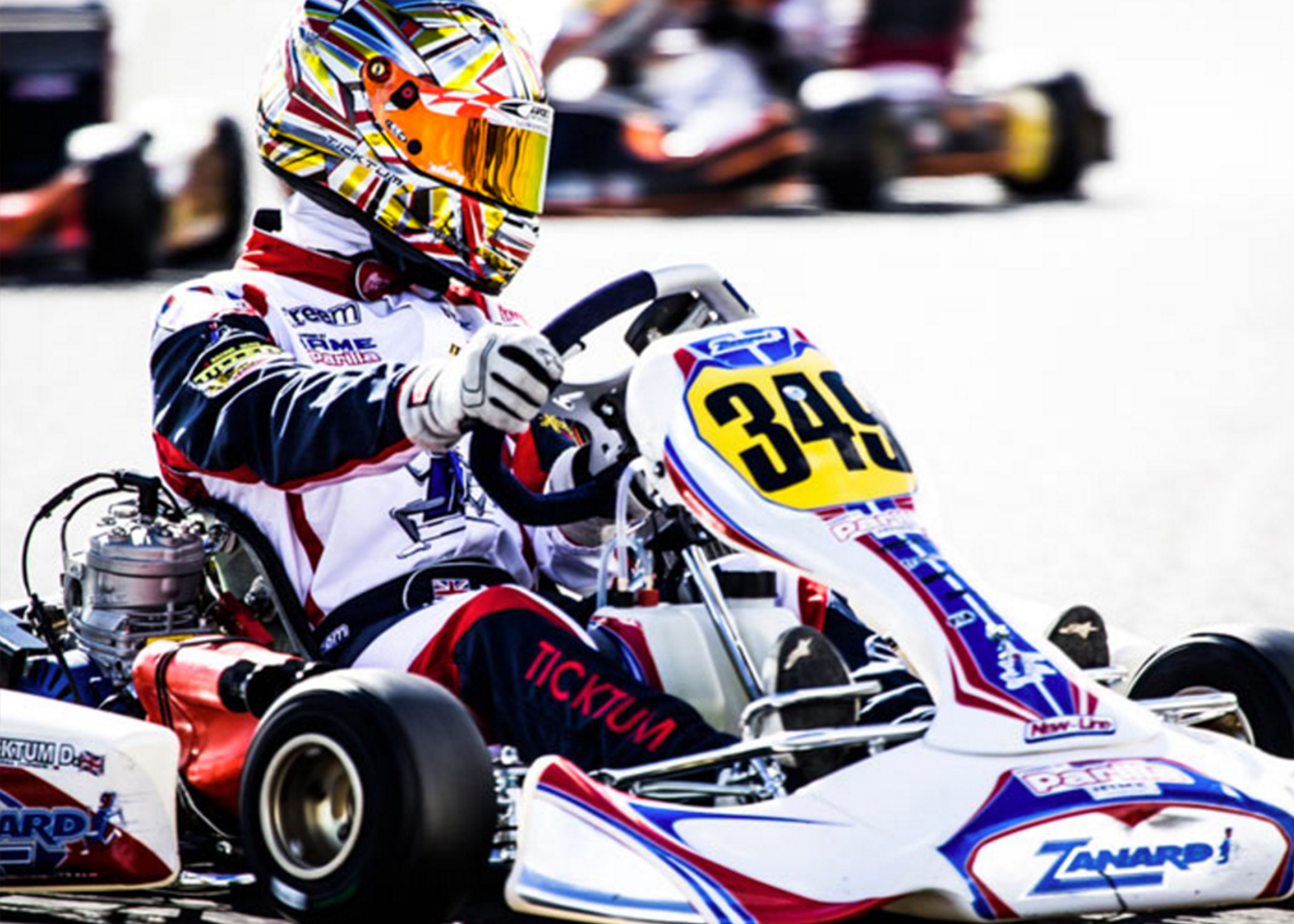
Dan Ticktum beat European Champion Lando Norris to the KF-J title in 2013.

South Garda Karting in Lonato del Garda, Lombardy, became the venue of the Margutti from 2012 onwards; the organisers proclaimed it as the ideal venue to restore the prestige of the competition. The debut event at Lonato had 246 entrants from 33 nations, the highest figure since 2003, over 60% of whom were foreigners. Felice Tiene won the senior class that year, as Martin Kodrić beat Lance Stroll and Álex Palou to the junior title; Charles Leclerc and George Russell each claimed seventh in KF2 and KF3, respectively. Reigning European Champion Fabian Federer was imperious in KZ2, while American prospect Logan Sargeant became the first non-European winner of the competition in Mini. 2013 saw a dive to 180 entrants as factory-backed teams deserted the event, when Dorian Boccolacci beat Lonato-raised Luca Corberi in the renamed KF class and Dan Ticktum claimed victory in KF-Junior (KF-J) as European Champion Lando Norris ended fifth. The gearbox and Mini classes were won by Kristijan Habulin and Domenico Cicognini, respectively. A record 82% of entrants in KF were foreign, with 73% in KF-J and 60% in KZ2.

In 2014, class victories were claimed by inaugural Mini winner and reigning KF-J World Champion Lorandi (KF), Max Fewtrell (KF-J), Marco Zanchetta (KZ2), and Antonio Serravalle (Mini) in a four-way battle. Alexander Vartanyan took the senior title in 2015, amid a further fall to 160 entrants, as Indian driver Kush Maini became the first Asian winner in KF-J; four-time World Champion Davide Forè was victorious in KZ2, alongside Leonardo Marseglia in Mini after a final-lap overtake. The year marked the final appearance of KF regulations, which were replaced by OK and OK-Junior (OK-J) regulations from 2016 onwards as costs for competitors spiralled due to the presence of manually-controlled front brakes, sophisticated cable systems, and fragility of components. Russians dominated the 2016 edition on an renovated Lonato circuit: Alexander Smolyar took victory in the six-entrant OK class; Ivan Shvetsov won the OK-J title in an all-Russian podium, alongside Pavel Bulantsev and Bogdan Fetisov; and Ruslan Fomin claimed the Mini class, where nine-year-old Italian prodigy Andrea Kimi Antonelli finished eighteenth after qualifying third. Giacomo Pollini beat Alexander Schmitz by 0.077 seconds in the KZ2 final, decided by a photo finish, after a final-lap pass.

2017 saw the introduction of X30 Senior as a secondary senior class, operating as a spec series on Italian American Motor Engineering (IAME) equipment and awarding the X30 Trophy, an adaptation to retain entry figures; Vittorio Russo was the inaugural winner. Callum Bradshaw claimed the OK title, as Andrea Rosso won in OK-J, Riccardo Longhi in KZ2, and Alfio Spina in Mini. Vroomkart described the 2018 edition as being the "almost British Margutti Trophy" due to inclement weather conditions. Reigning OK-J winner Rosso won in OK, as Marco Moretti reigned in X30 Senior over his brother Andrea; the OK-J class was won by Enzo Trulli, the son of Jarno Trulli—who was a friend of Margutti and finished fourth in the 1993 edition—ahead of Gabriel Bortoleto, while Lorandi returned from the GP3 Series claimed his third title in KZ2. Josh Irfan beat fellow British prodigy Arvid Lindblad in Mini. In 2019, Leonardo Bertini Colla beat David Liwiński and Leonardo Fornaroli in OK, Edoardo Villa was victorious in X30 Senior, Theo Wernersson in OK-J, Émilien Denner in KZ2, and Joel Bergström in Mini.

==== 2020–2023: X30 era ====
The 2020 edition celebrated the thirtieth anniversary of the event, delayed to November amidst the COVID-19 pandemic in Lombardy and temporarily returned to Castelletto. The OK class was removed as a result of the pandemic, leaving X30 Senior as the sole senior competition, where Villa successfully defended his title. Jamaican driver Alex Powell of the Mercedes Junior Team became the first Caribbean victor in OK-J, Clément Outran won in the new X30 Junior category, rising star Senna van Walstijn in KZ2, and René Lammers in Mini, the latter now officially recognised by CIK-FIA. OK-J was notably absent in 2021, which was again delayed due to COVID-19, with René Lammers claiming the X30 Junior title; Cristian Comanducci won in X30 Senior, Van Walstijn successfully defended the KZ2 title, and Emanuele Olivieri led in Mini after polesitter Christian Costoya was condemned to third following an early incident.

In 2022, Danny Carenini was victorious in X30 Senior, Mark Dubnitski in the return of OK-J, Riccardo Cirelli in X30 Junior, and Giuseppe Palomba in KZ2; Dries Van Langendonck held off rival Costoya to claim the Mini crown. Carenini defended the X30 Senior title in 2023, which had been exclusively won by Italians in its seven-year presence at the competition. Oleksandr Legenkyi was victorious in the inaugural running of the Mini U10 class for drivers aged 8–10, the youngest age group in the history of the competition, and Bosco Arias in the ACI Sport–sanctioned Mini Gr.3. The other victors were Romanian driver David Cosma Cristofor (OK-J), Riccardo Ferrari (X30 Junior), and Cristian Bertuca (KZ2).

==== 2024–present: Introduction of OK-N and record entry figures ====
For 2024, the IAME classes were replaced by the low-cost OK-National (OK-N) and OKN-Junior (OKN-J) approved by the FIA World Motor Sport Council in 2022: Italians Federico Albanese and Ludovico Mazzola were the victors in OK-N and OKN-J, respectively, on its debut. Kilian Josseron won in OK-J—where original victor Ilia Berezkin was penalised and Ethan Lennon became the first African driver to finish on the podium—Arthur Poulain in KZ2, Alessandro Truchot in Mini, and nine-year-old Niccolò Perico in Mini U10. Upon the death of Pellegrini later that year, his children—Tiziano, Donatella, and Germano—assumed ownership of the venue, which they had controlled since the early 1990s. To-be World Cup winner Manuel Scognamiglio claimed the 2025 OK-N victory, with Berezkin achieving redemption in OK-J, Vsevolod Osadchyi-Suslovskyi holding off Nicola Stanley in OKN-J, reigning World Cup winner Bertuca winning his second gearbox title, Perico following his under-10 title with victory in the under-12 class, and Jan Ruudi Algre taking the Mini U10 class.

The presence of drivers of this calibre, combined with ever larger and more competitive grids, once again confirms the central role of the Margutti Trophy on the karting calendar, and much of the credit goes to Parma Motorsport, which over the years has preserved the spirit of the event while ensuring high organisational standards. In a landscape increasingly crowded with championships and international events, it is not easy to maintain the prestige of a single race, but the Margutti Trophy continues to succeed.

— Fabio Marangon, "The Margutti is timeless", Vroomkart (12 March 2026)

The 2026 edition saw record entry figures with 156 entrants in OK-N and OKN-J alone, up from 88 in 2025, surpassing the numbers present at the World Cup; reigning OK-N winner Scognamiglio said "it feels just like the 100 cc era of the 90s". The senior class was won by Nicolas Marchesi and the junior class by Gioele Carrer, while KZ2 was dominated by Bertuca in his third triumph—ahead of 51-year-old, 2015 winner Davide Forè—the under-12 class was controlled by Briton Alfie Mair, and under-10 by American prodigy Zayne Burgess.

== Format ==
The Andrea Margutti Trophy holds four-day weekends: free practice sessions on Thursday and Friday morning, time trials on Friday afternoon, qualifying heats on Friday afternoon and Saturday, and pre-finals/finals on Sunday. In 2018, the full-service registration fees were: €460 for OK, OK-J, and KZ2; €325 for 60 Mini; and €260 for the IAME classes. By 2026, the fees increased to €540 for all six planned classes: OK-J, KZ2, OK-N, OKN-J, Mini Gr.3, and Mini U10.

As of 2026, the event is held over a four-day weekend composed of free practice (FP), time trials (TT), qualifying heats (QH), pre-finals (PF), and the finals:

- Thursday: FP;
- Friday: FP (morning), TT + QH (afternoon);
- Saturday: warm-up + QH + repêchages;
- Sunday: warm-up + repêchages + PF (morning), Mini U10, OK-N, Mini Gr.3, OKN-J, and KZ2 final (afternoon).

== Circuits ==
Locations of the Andrea Margutti Trophy since 1990.
2026 venue in bold.

The Andrea Margutti Trophy has been contested at four Italian circuits throughout its history. The inaugural two editions were held at the Pista d'Oro in Rome, host of the first CIK-FIA World Championship in 1964. Under request from the owner of Parma Kartdrome, Umberto Pellegrini, and his family, the event was hosted at the venue from 1992 to 2008. It has been held in Lombardy since 2009: the Circuito Internazionale 7 Laghi Kart in Castelletto di Branduzzo until 2011, and South Garda Karting in Lonato del Garda—host of the South Garda Winter Cup—ever since, barring the rescheduled 2020 edition in Castelletto.

== Live coverage ==
The Andrea Margutti Trophy is broadcast on YouTube—formerly televised via Play TV, Nuvolari, Sportitalia, Rai Sport, Odeon 24, and the competition's official website—with live footage, commentary, and interviews on the finals day. The 2026 edition had a record online viewership of over 10 thousand people, up from five thousand the year prior. LSTiming provides live timing for each event, including free practice and all competitive sessions, via their website.

== Palmarès ==
Key
Drivers
*	Driver has competed in Formula One		
†	Formula One World Drivers' Champion		
‡	FIA World Champion in an auto racing discipline		
Tyres
**B**	Bridgestone	**L**	LeCont
**C**	Carlisle	**M**	Maxxis
**D**	Dunlop	**M**	MG Tires
**G**	Goodyear	**M**	Mojo
**K**	Komet	**V**	Vega

=== Senior classes (1990–present) ===
==== Primary senior class (1990–present) ====
Year	Winner	Chassis	Engine	Tyres	Runner-up	Third place	Class	Stroke
Nazionale
1990	(Province of Parma) Andrea Belicchi	Tony Kart	Vortex	V	(Province of Forlì-Cesena) Alessandro Manetti	(Naples) Gennaro Piccolo	100cc	
1991	(Rome) Giancarlo Fisichella*	PCR	PCR	V	(Rome) Cesare Balistreri	(Rome) Patrick Crinelli	FA	100cc
1992	(Rome) Giancarlo Fisichella* (2)	PCR	PCR	V	(Denmark) Jason Watt	(France) Olivier Fiorucci	ICA	100cc
1993	(Province of Parma) Andrea Belicchi (2)	Tony Kart	Italsistem	B	(Province of Frosinone) Giuseppe Palmieri	(Milan) Gianluca Beggio	FA	100cc
Internazionale
1994	(Italy) Giancarlo Fisichella* (3)	PCR	PCR	B	(Italy) Gianluca Beggio	(Italy) Daniele Dallari	FA	100cc
1995	(Belgium) Sophie Kumpen	CRG	Rotax	B	(Denmark) Gert Munkholm	(Sweden) Johnny Mislijevic	FA	100cc
1996	(Italy) Alessandro Manetti	CRG	CRG	B	(Italy) Massimiliano Orsini	(Netherlands) Lotta Hellberg	FA	100cc
1997	(Spain) Antonio García	Mari Kart	Italsistem	V	(Italy) Giuseppe Palmieri	(Italy) Massimiliano Orsini	FA	100cc
1998	(Italy) Massimiliano Orsini	Swiss Hutless	Italsistem	B	(Sweden) Rickard Kaell	(Australia) Ryan Briscoe	FA	100cc
1999	(Italy) Sauro Cesetti	Kosmic	Vortex	B	(Italy) Cesare Balistreri	(Italy) Gianluca Beggio	FA	100cc
2000	(Finland) Toni Vilander	PCR	PCR	D	(Sweden) Rickard Kaell	(Italy) Marco Ardigò	FA	100cc
2001	(Italy) Sauro Cesetti (2)	Kosmic	Vortex	B	(Netherlands) Ben Jamini	(Belgium) Bruno Vroomen	FA	100cc
2002	(Italy) Davide Gaggianesi	Birel	Parilla	V	(Italy) Sauro Cesetti	(Venezuela) Pastor Maldonado*	FA	100cc
2003	(Netherlands) Carlo van Dam	Tony Kart	Vortex	V	(Italy) Michele Fanetti	(Germany) Michael Ammermüller	FA	100cc
2004	(United Kingdom) Ben Hanley	Maranello	Maxter	B	(Italy) Davide Forè	(United Kingdom) Martin Plowman	FA	100cc
2005	(Switzerland) Edoardo Mortara	Tony Kart	Vortex	V	(Italy) Davide Forè	(Italy) Marco Ardigò	FA	100cc
2006	(Italy) Marco Ardigò	Tony Kart	Vortex	V	(France) Manuel Renaudie	(France) Florian Alfano	FA	100cc
2007	(United Kingdom) Gary Catt	Tony Kart	Vortex	V	(Italy) Marco Ardigò	(United Kingdom) James Calado‡	KF1	125cc
2008	(United Kingdom) Gary Catt (2)	Tony Kart	Vortex	V	(Italy) Alessandro Bressan	(Italy) Marco Ardigò	KF1	125cc
2009	(France) Brandon Maïsano	Intrepid	TM	B	(Italy) Matteo Viganò	(Italy) Antonio Giovinazzi*‡	KF2	125cc
2010	(Denmark) Jacob Nortoft	FA Kart	Vortex	V	(Italy) Stefano Cucco	(United Kingdom) Mitchell Gilbert (Note: Mitchell Gilbert is Australian and Malaysian but competed under a British licence.)	KF2	125cc
2011	(Switzerland) Alain Valente	Swiss Hutless	BMB	V	(Switzerland) Pascal Eberle	(Russia) Ivan Kostyukov	KF2	125cc
2012	(Italy) Felice Tiene	CRG	BMB	V	(United Kingdom) Tom Joyner	(Belgium) Sami Luka	KF2	125cc
2013	(France) Dorian Boccolacci	Energy	TM	V	(Italy) Luca Corberi	(Russia) Egor Stupenkov	KF	125cc
2014	(Italy) Alessio Lorandi	Tony Kart	TM	V	(Singapore) Julien Fong Wei Jie	(Italy) Andrea Moretti	KF	125cc
2015	(Russia) Alexander Vartanyan	Tony Kart	Vortex	V	(Italy) Leonardo Lorandi	(United Kingdom) Max Fewtrell	KF	125cc
2016	(Russia) Alexander Smolyar	Tony Kart	Vortex	V	(Denmark) Emil Dose	(Sweden) Simon Ohlin	OK	125cc
2017	(United Kingdom) Callum Bradshaw	CRG	Parilla	L	(Italy) Lorenzo Travisanutto	(United Kingdom) Finlay Kenneally	OK	125cc
2018	(Italy) Andrea Rosso	CRG	TM	V	(Germany) Marius Zug	(Denmark) Mads E. Hansen	OK	125cc
2019	(Italy) Leonardo Bertini Colla	KR	IAME	V	(Netherlands) David Liwiński	(Italy) Leonardo Fornaroli	OK	125cc
2020	(Italy) Edoardo Villa	TB	IAME	K	(Italy) Valentino Baracco	(Italy) Brando Pozzi	X30-S	125cc
2021	(Italy) Cristian Comanducci	Tony Kart	IAME	K	(Andorra) Alex Machado	(Italy) Leonardo Megna	X30-S	125cc
2022	(Italy) Danny Carenini	KR	IAME	K	(Italy) Andrea Barbieri	(Italy) Sebastiano Pavan	X30-S	125cc
2023	(Italy) Danny Carenini (2)	Energy	IAME	K	(Italy) Giulio Olivieri	(Italy) Brando Pozzi	X30-S	125cc
2024	(Italy) Federico Albanese	Italcorse	TM	M	(Switzerland) Christian Canonica	(Poland) Karol Pasiewicz	OK-N	125cc
2025	(Italy) Manuel Scognamiglio	Tony Kart	IAME	M	(Italy) Daniele Vezzelli	(Italy) Nicolas Marchesi	OK-N	125cc
2026	(Italy) Nicolas Marchesi	KR	TM	M	(Italy) Riccardo Brangero	(Italy) Sebastiano Pavan	OK-N	125cc

==== Secondary senior class (1990–2019) ====
Year	Winner	Chassis	Engine	Tyres	Runner-up	Third place	Class	Stroke
Nazionale
1990	(Rome) Giancarlo Fisichella*	PCR	PCR	V	(Province of Ravenna) Massimiliano Orsini	(Rome) Patrick Crinelli	ICA	100cc
1991	(Calabria) Pietro Saitta	MRC	Atomik	V	(Province of Cuneo) Bruno Balocco	(Province of Piacenza) Nicola Gianniberti	ICA	100cc
1992	No secondary senior class contested							
1993	(Province of Ascoli Piceno) Sauro Cesetti	Birel	Parilla	V	(Province of Brescia) Walter Conforti	(Province of Bergamo) Marco Gamba	ICA	100cc
Internazionale
1994	(Italy) Matteo Boscolo	Mari Kart	Italsistem	V	(Italy) Ennio Gandolfi	(Italy) Gabriele Lancieri	ICA	100cc
1995	(Italy) Massimo Del Col	Tony Kart	Italsistem	B	(Italy) Max Russomando	(Italy) Simone Fumagalli	ICA	100cc
1996	(Greece) Ioannis Antoniadis	Mari Kart	Italsistem	V	(Italy) Vitantonio Liuzzi*	(Italy) Antony Bertocchi	ICA	100cc
1997	(Italy) Steve Molini	Birel	Italsistem	B	(Italy) Matteo Grassotto	(Denmark) Martin Jensen	ICA	100cc
1998	(Italy) Giorgio Evangelisti	Mari Kart	Italsistem	V	(Italy) Ketty D'Ambroso	(Italy) Andrea Tressino	ICA	100cc
1999	(Italy) Michele Rugolo	PCR	PCR	V	(Italy) Alexio Lattanzi	(Italy) Marco Ardigò	ICA	100cc
2000	(Italy) Stefano Proetto	PCR	PCR	D	(Italy) Giacomo Ricci	(Italy) Alessandro Pier Guidi‡	ICA	100cc
2001	(France) Jean-Philippe Guignet	Tony Kart	Vortex	V	(France) Franck Mailleux	(Italy) Salvatore Gatto	ICA	100cc
2002	(France) Jérémy Iglesias	PCR	PCR	V	(Italy) Stefano Albertini	(Switzerland) Hans Remschnig	ICA	100cc
2003	(United Kingdom) Oliver Oakes	Tony Kart	Vortex	V	(Denmark) Nicolaj Bøllingtoft	(Italy) Marco Mapelli	ICA	100cc
2004	(Netherlands) Henkie Waldschmidt	CRG	Maxter	V	(United Kingdom) Jon Lancaster	(Italy) Andrea Todisco	ICA	100cc
2005	(Italy) Andrea Dalè	Van Speed	TM	V	(Austria) Daniel Weber	(Italy) Alessandro Bosca	ICA	100cc
2006	(Germany) Marco Wittmann	Birel	TM	V	(Germany) Burkhard Maring	(Italy) Giovanni Erba	ICA	100cc
2007	(Germany) Burkhard Maring	Birel	IAME	V	(United Kingdom) Will Stevens*	(Czech Republic) Libor Toman	KF2	125cc
2008	(Czech Republic) Zdeněk Groman	Maranello	Parilla	V	(Italy) Giacomo Patrono	(United Kingdom) Tom Grice	KF2	125cc
2009 – 2016	No secondary senior class contested							
2017	(Italy) Vittorio Russo	Tony Kart	IAME	K	(Italy) Andrea Bristot	(Italy) Alessandro Brigatti	X30-S	125cc
2018	(Italy) Marco Moretti	Tony Kart	IAME	K	(Italy) Andrea Moretti	(Italy) Vittorio Russo	X30-S	125cc
2019	(Italy) Edoardo Villa	TB	IAME	K	(Italy) Danny Carenini	(Italy) Vittorio Russo	X30-S	125cc

=== Junior classes (1992–present) ===
==== Primary junior class (1992–present) ====
Year	Winner	Chassis	Engine	Tyres	Runner-up	Third place	Class	Stroke
Nazionale
1992	(Province of Cuneo) Bruno Balocco	Rakama	IAME	V	(Province of Pordenone) Massimo Del Col	(Province of Teramo) Gianluca Carradori	ICA-J	100cc
1993	(Province of Cremona) Ennio Gandolfi	Kalì	Comer	V	(Province of Padua) Giorgio Pantano*	(Milan) Max Russomando	ICA-J	100cc
Internazionale
1994	(United Kingdom) Doug Bell	Top-Kart	Comer	V	(Italy) Giorgio Pantano*	(Netherlands) Wouter van Eeuwijk	ICA-J	100cc
1995	(Germany) André Lotterer*‡	Tony Kart	Italsistem	V	(Spain) Antonio García	(Italy) Alessandro Piccolo	ICA-J	100cc
1996	(Germany) André Lotterer*‡ (2)	Tony Kart	Vortex	V	(Italy) Francesco Basilico	(Australia) Ryan Briscoe	ICA-J	100cc
1997	(Netherlands) Ben Benjamin	CRG	CRG	B	(Italy) Andrea Bonetti	(Australia) Clayton Pyne	ICA-J	100cc
1998	(Italy) Stefano Fabi	Top-Kart	Comer	B	(Italy) Marco Ardigò	(Italy) Alessandro Pier Guidi‡	ICA-J	100cc
1999	(Poland) Robert Kubica*	CRG	CRG	V	(Netherlands) Georgio Garritsen	(Italy) Alessandro Bonetti	ICA-J	100cc
2000	(Italy) Pietro Ricci	Birel	Parilla	V	(France) Jean-Philippe Guignet	(Spain) Adrián Vallés	ICA-J	100cc
2001	(Spain) Miguel Gallego	Tony Kart	Vortex	V	(Netherlands) Nick de Bruijn	(Italy) Francesco Antonucci	ICA-J	100cc
2002	(Italy) Andrea Todisco	Birel	TM	V	(Switzerland) Sébastien Buemi*‡	(United Kingdom) Bradley Ellis	ICA-J	100cc
2003	(Spain) Dani Clos	Birel	Parilla	V	(Spain) Miguel Molina	(France) Jules Bianchi*	ICA-J	100cc
2004	(Monaco) Stefano Coletti	Birel	TM	V	(Italy) Marco Zipoli	(France) Jules Bianchi*	ICA-J	100cc
2005	(France) Charles Pic*	Birel	Parilla	V	(Spain) Roberto Merhi*	(Spain) Aleix Alcaraz	ICA-J	100cc
2006	(United Kingdom) Nigel Moore	BRM	Parilla	V	(Italy) Flavio Camponeschi	(Czech Republic) Libor Toman	ICA-J	100cc
2007	(United Kingdom) Jack Harvey	Maranello	MRC	V	(Italy) Matteo Beretta	(Finland) Petri Suvanto	KF3	125cc
2008	(Italy) Ignazio D'Agosto	Tony Kart	Vortex	D	(Finland) Aaro Vainio	(Italy) Kevin Ceccon	KF3	125cc
2009	(Italy) Daniil Kvyat* (Note: Daniil Kvyat is Russian but competed under an Italian licence.)	Tony Kart	Vortex	D	(Netherlands) Nyck de Vries*‡	(Italy) Raffaele Marciello	KF3	125cc
2010	(Italy) Loris Spinelli	Intrepid	TM	V	(Italy) Esteban Ocon* (Note: Esteban Ocon is French but competed under an Italian licence.)	(Italy) Fabio Filippo Cavallaro	KF3	125cc
2011	(Denmark) Slavko Ivanovic	Tony Kart	Vortex	V	(Sweden) Robin Hansson	(United Kingdom) Harrison Scott	KF3	125cc
2012	(Croatia) Martin Kodrić	FA Kart	Vortex	V	(Canada) Lance Stroll*	(Spain) Álex Palou	KF3	125cc
2013	(United Kingdom) Dan Ticktum	FA Kart	Vortex	V	(Russia) Nikita Sitnikov	(France) Gabriel Aubry	KF-J	125cc
2014	(United Kingdom) Max Fewtrell	FA Kart	Vortex	V	(Russia) Alexander Vartanyan	(Italy) Leonardo Lorandi	KF-J	125cc
2015	(India) Kush Maini	Tony Kart	Vortex	V	(Italy) Lorenzo Colombo	(Spain) David Vidales	KF-J	125cc
2016	(Russia) Ivan Shvetsov	Tony Kart	Vortex	V	(Russia) Pavel Bulantsev	(Russia) Bogdan Fetisov	OK-J	125cc
2017	(Italy) Andrea Rosso	Tony Kart	Vortex	V	(Italy) Mattia Michelotto	(Italy) Leonardo Marseglia	OK-J	125cc
2018	(Italy) Enzo Trulli	CRG	TM	V	(Brazil) Gabriel Bortoleto*	(Denmark) Mikkel Højgaard Petersen	OK-J	125cc
2019	(Sweden) Theo Wernersson	Kosmic	TM	V	(Finland) Samuli Mertsalmi	(Denmark) Mickey Magnussen	OK-J	125cc
2020	(Jamaica) Alex Powell	KR	IAME	V	(China) Yuanpu Cui	(Italy) Giovanni Trentin	OK-J	125cc
2021	(Netherlands) René Lammers	Parolin	IAME	K	(Italy) Giulio Olivieri	(France) Paul Alberto	X30-J	125cc
2022	(Estonia) Mark Dubnitski	KR	TM	V	(Austria) Nando Weixelbaumer	(Czech Republic) Jakub Kameník	OK-J	125cc
2023	(Romania) David Cosma Cristofor	KR	IAME	V	(Germany) Simon Rechenmacher	(Ukraine) Lev Krutogolov	OK-J	125cc
2024	(Switzerland) Kilian Josseron	Righetti Ridolfi	IAME	V	(Japan) Kosei Oguma	(South Africa) Ethan Lennon	OK-J	125cc
2025	Ilia Berezkin	Kalì	TM	V	(Czech Republic) Matyas Vitver	(Norway) Noah Antonsen	OK-J	125cc
2026	(Italy) Gioele Carrer	EKS	Modena	M	(France) Mattis Brageot	(Italy) Victor Gorun (Note: Victor Gorun is Romanian but competed under an Italian licence.)	OKN-J	125cc

==== Secondary junior class (2020–2025) ====
Year	Winner	Chassis	Engine	Tyres	Runner-up	Third place	Class	Stroke
2020	(France) Clément Outran	KR	IAME	**K**	(Ukraine) Oleksandr Bondarev	(Italy) Manuel Scognamiglio	X30-J	125cc
2021	No secondary junior class contested							
2022	(Italy) Riccardo Cirelli	Tony Kart	IAME	**K**	(Italy) Riccardo Ferrari	(Sweden) Vilmer Svahn	X30-J	125cc
2023	(Italy) Riccardo Ferrari	Tony Kart	IAME	**K**	(Italy) Alberto Fulgori Jr.	(Italy) Fabio Reale	X30-J	125cc
2024	(Italy) Ludovico Mazzola	Exprit	Vortex	**M**	(Greece) Nikolaos Karagiannis	(Poland) Wiktor Stalmach	OKN-J	125cc
2025	(Ukraine) Vsevolod Osadchyi-Suslovskyi	Monster	TM	**M**	(United States) Nicola Stanley	(Italy) Cristian Blandino	OKN-J	125cc

=== Gearbox class (2009–present) ===
Year	Winner	Chassis	Engine	Tyres	Runner-up	Third place	Class	Stroke
2009	(United Kingdom) Jack Hawksworth	Energy	TM	V	(France) Anthony Abbasse	(France) Manuel Renaudie	KZ2	125cc
2010	(Germany) Simon Solgat	Birel	TM	V	(United Kingdom) Jack Hawksworth	(Italy) Yuri Lucati	KZ2	125cc
2011	(Czech Republic) Adam Janouš	Intrepid	TM	V	(Italy) Massimo Aceto	(Italy) Alberto Cavalieri	KZ2	125cc
2012	(Italy) Fabian Federer	CRG	Maxter	V	(Italy) Massimo Dante	(Italy) Paolo Bonetti	KZ2	125cc
2013	(Croatia) Kristijan Habulin	CRG	Modena	V	(Italy) Massimo Dante	(Sweden) Douglas Lundberg	KZ2	125cc
2014	(Italy) Marco Zanchetta	Maranello	TM	V	(Italy) Lorenzo Camplese	(Italy) Luca Corberi	KZ2	125cc
2015	(Italy) Davide Forè	CRG	TM	V	(Italy) Massimo Dante	(Germany) Alexander Schmitz	KZ2	125cc
2016	(Italy) Giacomo Pollini	CRG	TM	V	(Germany) Alexander Schmitz	(Italy) Alberto Cavalieri	KZ2	125cc
2017	(Italy) Riccardo Longhi	Birel ART	TM	V	(Italy) Fabian Federer	(Italy) Giacomo Pollini	KZ2	125cc
2018	(Italy) Alessio Lorandi	Parolin	TM	V	(Italy) Fabian Federer	(Sweden) Törnqvist Persson	KZ2	125cc
2019	(France) Émilien Denner	Sodi	TM	V	(Italy) Giuseppe Palomba	(Italy) William Lanzeni	KZ2	125cc
2020	(Netherlands) Senna van Walstijn	Sodi	TM	V	(Italy) Filippo Berto	(Italy) Luca Bosco	KZ2	125cc
2021	(Netherlands) Senna van Walstijn (2)	Sodi	TM	V	(France) Jean Nomblot	(Sweden) Douglas Lundberg	KZ2	125cc
2022	(Italy) Giuseppe Palomba	Birel ART	TM	V	(Italy) Riccardo Longhi	(Italy) Marco Tormen	KZ2	125cc
2023	(Italy) Cristian Bertuca	Birel ART	TM	V	(Romania) Daniel Vasile	(Estonia) Markus Kajak	KZ2	125cc
2024	(France) Arthur Poulain	Sodi	TM	V	(Poland) David Liwiński	(Netherlands) Senna van Walstijn	KZ2	125cc
2025	(Italy) Cristian Bertuca (2)	Birel ART	TM	V	(Italy) Marco Tormen	(Poland) Karol Pasiewicz	KZ2	125cc
2026	(Italy) Cristian Bertuca (3)	Birel ART	IAME	V	(Italy) Davide Forè	(Italy) Marco Tormen	KZ2	125cc

=== Mini classes (2010–present) ===
==== Under-12 class (2010–present) ====
Year	Winner	Chassis	Engine	Tyres	Runner-up	Third place	Class	Stroke
2010	(Italy) Alessio Lorandi	Tony Kart	Vortex	V	(Italy) Alessandro Stura	(Russia) Robert Shwartzman	60M	60cc
2011	(Romania) Marcu Dionisios	Top-Kart	LKE	V	(Russia) Alexander Zhirkov	(Russia) Robert Shwartzman	60M	60cc
2012	(United States) Logan Sargeant*	Tony Kart	LKE	L	(Italy) Christian Cobellini	(Italy) Simone Mazzotti	60M	60cc
2013	(Italy) Domenico Cicognini	Kosmic	LKE	L	(Italy) Lorenzo Colombo	(Ukraine) Makar Mizevych	60M	60cc
2014	(Italy) Antonio Serravalle	Tony Kart	LKE	V	(Bulgaria) Dmitrii Bogdanov	(Italy) Christian Cobellini	60M	60cc
2015	(Italy) Leonardo Marseglia	CRG	TM	V	(Italy) Giuseppe Fusco	(Italy) Marzio Moretti	60M	60cc
2016	(Russia) Ruslan Fomin	Tony Kart	TM	V	(France) Evann Mallet	(Russia) Kirill Smal	60M	60cc
2017	(Italy) Alfio Spina	CRG	TM	V	(Russia) Nikita Bedrin	(Italy) Alessandro Cenedese	60M	60cc
2018	(United Kingdom) Josh Irfan	Parolin	TM	V	(United Kingdom) Arvid Lindblad*	(Sweden) Joel Bergström	60M	60cc
2019	(Sweden) Joel Bergström	Parolin	TM	V	(Belgium) Ean Eyckmans	(United Arab Emirates) Rashid Al Dhaheri	60M	60cc
2020	(Netherlands) René Lammers	Parolin	IAME	V	(Finland) Kimi Tani	(Poland) Maciej Gładysz	60M	60cc
2021	(Italy) Emanuele Olivieri	IPK	TM	V	(Romania) David Cosma Cristofor	(Spain) Christian Costoya	60M	60cc
2022	(Belgium) Dries Van Langendonck	Parolin	TM	V	(Spain) Christian Costoya	(Italy) Iacopo Martinese	60M	60cc
2023	(Spain) Bosco Arias	KR	IAME	V	(Canada) Ilie Tristan Crisan	(Turkey) İskender Zülfikari	Gr.3	60cc
2024	(Italy) Alessandro Truchot (Note: Alessandro Truchot is French and American but competed under an Italian licence.)	Parolin	IAME	M	(Indonesia) Oliveri Sini	(Italy) Julian Frasnelli	Gr.3	60cc
2025	(Italy) Niccolò Perico	KR	IAME	M	(Germany) Tiberius Müller	(United Kingdom) Mason Robertson	Gr.3	60cc
2026	(United Kingdom) Alfie Mair	Tony Kart	Vortex	M	(Spain) Abraham Schelvis	(Italy) Andreas Papageorgiou (Note: Andreas Papageorgiou is Cypriot but competed under an Italian licence.)	Gr.3	60cc

==== Under-10 class (2023–present) ====
Year	Winner	Chassis	Engine	Tyres	Runner-up	Third place	Class	Stroke
2023	(Italy) Oleksandr Legenkyi (Note: Oleksandr Legenkyi is Ukrainian but competed under an Italian licence.)	KR	IAME	**V**	(Switzerland) Albert Tamm	(Italy) Andrii Kruglyk	U10	60cc
2024	(Italy) Niccolò Perico	Energy	TM	**M**	(Estonia) Mark Loomets	(Italy) Lorenzo Di Pietrantonio	U10	60cc
2025	(Estonia) Jan Ruudi Algre	KR	IAME	**M**	(Italy) Andreas Papageorgiou	(United States) Josh Bergman	U10	60cc
2026	(Italy) Zayne Burgess (Note: Zayne Burgess is American and Jamaican but competed under an Italian licence.)	Parolin	LKE	**M**	(Italy) Oliver Weytjens (Note: Oliver Weytjens is Spanish and Belgian but competed under an Italian licence.)	(Estonia) Sten Mihailov	U10	60cc

== Records and statistics ==
=== Most titles by drivers ===
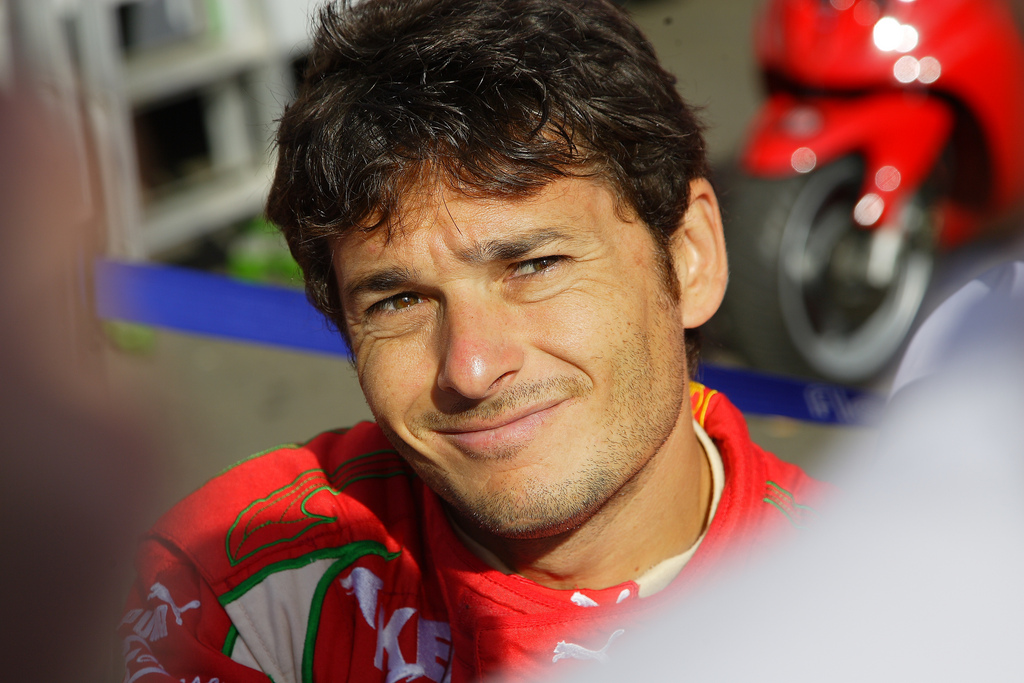
Giancarlo Fisichella, a close friend of Margutti, won a record four titles between 1990 and 1994 in the FA and ICA classes.

#	Driver	Titles	Category	Span	Age
1	(Italy) Giancarlo Fisichella*	4	ICA, FA	1990–1994	17–21
2	(Italy) Sauro Cesetti	3	ICA, FA	1993–2001	17–25
2	(Italy) Alessio Lorandi	3	60M, KF, KZ2	2010–2018	11–19
2	(Italy) Cristian Bertuca	3	KZ2	2023–2026	16–19
4	(Italy) Edoardo Villa	2	X30-S	2019–2020	15–16
4	(Netherlands) Senna van Walstijn	2	KZ2	2020–2021	17–18
4	(Netherlands) René Lammers	2	60M, X30-J	2020–2021	12
4	(Italy) Danny Carenini	2	X30-S	2022–2023	20–21
4	(Italy) Niccolò Perico	2	U10, Gr.3	2024–2025	9–10

=== Most titles by chassis manufacturers ===
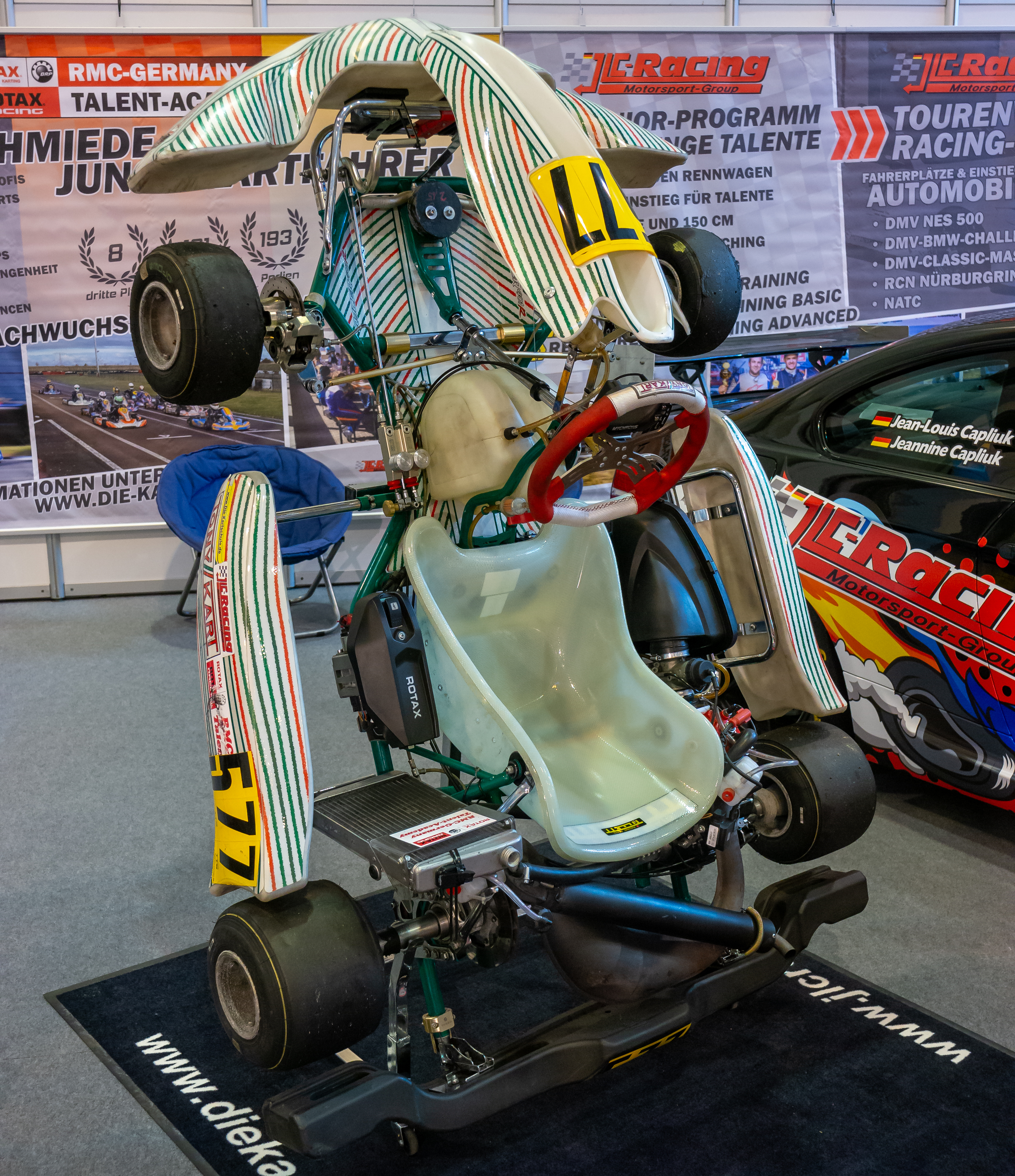
Tony Kart chassis have won a record 33 titles since the inaugural edition in 1990.

#	Chassis	Titles	Span
1	Tony Kart (Note: Brand of OTK Kart Group.)	33	1990–2026
2	Birel / Birel ART (Note: Brand of Korus Group since 2026.)	16	1993–2026
3	CRG (Note: Brand of CRG Srl.)	15	1995–2018
4	Kart Republic	11	2019–2026
5	PCR	8	1990–2002
5	Parolin	8	2018–2026
7	Mari Kart	4	1994–1998
7	Maranello	4	2004–2014
7	FA Kart	4	2010–2014
7	Kosmic	4	1999–2019
7	Energy	4	2009–2024
7	Sodi	4	2019–2024

== See also ==
- Commission Internationale de Karting
- Kart racing
- List of kart racing championships
