= Cristian Bertuca =

Italian racing driver (born 2006)

- Nationality: (Italy) Italian
- Born: 31 August 2006 (age 20) Milan, Italy

Cristian Domenico Bertuca (born 31 August 2006) is an Italian racing driver who last competed for Omnia Motorsport in Porsche Carrera Cup Italy.

== Career ==
=== Karting (2015–present) ===
Bertuca made his karting debut in 2015, finishing tenth in the Italian Easykart Trophy 60cc class standings, and capping off the year with a 15th-place finish in the Easykart International Final. Continuing in mini karts for 2016, Bertuca won the Italian Easykart Trophy title, before joining EvoKart for the 2017 season, in which he primarily competed in international races. In his final season in mini karts, Bertuca finished third in the South Garda Winter Cup after leading much of the final from Kimi Antonelli, as well as finishing fourth in the end-of-year ROK Cup International Final.

In 2019, Bertuca joined Birel ART Racing to make his step-up to junior karts. In his first year with the team, Bertuca finished runner-up in the Italian Karting Championship's X30 standings and ninth in the Karting World Championship. Continuing in the category for 2020, Bertuca most notably finished seventh in the South Garda Winter Cup after starting 21st. Towards the end of the year, Bertuca also made his debut in senior karts, taking 12th at both the Karting World Championship and the WSK Open Cup. Continuing in senior karts full-time for 2021, Bertuca finished fourth in the Italian Karting Championship and the WSK Open Cup.

During lackluster second campaign in OK in 2022, Bertuca found more success in KZ2, finishing fourth in the Karting European Championship and second in the Karting World Cup in his rookie year in the category. Moving to shifter karts full-time for 2023, Bertuca achieved his first successes in KZ2 by winning the WSK Champions Cup, the WSK Super Master Series and the Andrea Margutti Trophy. More success followed in 2024, in which Bertuca won his second Super Master Series title, as well as his maiden titles in the WSK Open Series and Karting World Cup.

In a reduced KZ2 schedule the following year, Bertuca took his second Andrea Margutti Trophy at the beginning of the year, before ending the season with triumphs in the WSK Final Cup and Trofeo Delle Industrie. During 2025, Bertuca also made his debut at the top-level of shifter karts, most notably finishing fourth in the European Championship and seventh in the World Championship. In parallel to his maiden season in cars, Bertuca continued to compete in shifter karts in 2026, as he started off the season by taking his third Andrea Margutti Trophy in KZ2.

=== Debut in cars (2026) ===
In 2026, Bertuca joined Ghinzani Motorsport–run Omnia Motorsport to make his car racing debut in Porsche Carrera Cup Italy. Competing in all but one round, Bertuca took a best result of sixth at Misano to take 13th in overall points. In April, Bertuca was invited by Tatuus to shake down its new Formula Regional car, the Tatuus F3 T-326, at Cremona.

== Karting record ==
=== Karting career summary ===
Season	Series	Team	Position
2015	Trofeo Italiano Easykart — 60cc	Alessandro Bertuca	10th
2015	Easykart International Final — 60cc	Alessandro Bertuca	15th
2016	South Garda Winter Cup — Mini Rok	Alessandro Bertuca	38th
2016	WSK Super Master Series — 60 Mini	Alessandro Bertuca	65th
2016	Trofeo Italiano Easykart — 60cc		1st
2016	WSK Night Edition — 60 Mini		30th
2016	ROK Cup International Final — Mini Rok		19th
2017	WSK Champions Cup — 60 Mini	Birel ART Poland by WTR	19th
2017	South Garda Winter Cup — Mini Rok	WTR	18th
2017	Andrea Margutti Trophy — 60 Mini	Birel ART Poland by WTR	5th
2017	Italian Karting Championship — 60 Mini		18th
2017	Trofeo Italiano Easykart — 60 Mini		3rd
2017	Trofeo Delle Industrie — 60 Mini	Evokart Srl	12th
2017	WSK Final Cup — 60 Mini	Evokart Srl	12th
2017	Trofeo Invernale Ayrton Senna — 60 Mini		4th
2018	WSK Champions Cup — 60 Mini	Evokart Srl	NC
2018	WSK Super Master Series — 60 Mini	Evokart Srl	9th
2018	South Garda Winter Cup — Mini Rok	Evokart Srl	3rd
2018	Andrea Margutti Trophy — 60 Mini	Evokart Srl	8th
2018	Italian Karting Championship — 60 Mini	Evokart Srl	8th
2018	WSK Open Cup — 60 Mini	Evokart Srl	21st
2018	ROK Cup International Final — Mini ROK	AV Racing	4th
2018	WSK Final Cup — 60 Mini	AV Racing	15th
2019	WSK Champions Cup — OK-J	Birel ART Racing	NC
2019	WSK Super Master Series — OK-J	Birel ART Racing	25th
2019	South Garda Winter Cup — OK-J	Birel ART Racing	NC
2019	Coupe de France — OK-J	Birel ART Racing	NC
2019	Karting European Championship — OK-J	Birel ART Racing	55th
2019	WSK Euro Series — OK-J	Birel ART Racing; Alessandro Bertuca (Note: Bertuca competed for Birel ART Racing in round 3 and competed as a Privateer in round 4.)	42nd
2019	Italian Karting Championship — X30 Junior		2nd
2019	IAME Euro Series — X30 Junior	MLG Racing	44th
2019	Karting World Championship — OK-J	Birel ART Racing	9th
2019	WSK Open Cup — OK-J	Birel ART Racing	26th
2019	Trofeo Delle Industrie — OK-J	Birel ART Racing	8th
2019	WSK Final Cup — OK-J	Birel ART Racing	17th
2019	SKUSA SuperNationals — X30 Junior		11th
2020	WSK Champions Cup — OK-J	Birel ART Racing	29th
2020	WSK Super Master Series — OK-J	Birel ART Racing	15th
2020	South Garda Winter Cup — OK-J	Birel ART Racing	7th
2020	WSK Euro Series — OK-J	Birel ART Racing	45th
2020	Champions of the Future — OK-J	Birel ART Racing	27th
2020	Karting European Championship — OK-J	Birel ART Racing	67th
2020	WSK Euro Series — OK	Birel ART Racing	14th
2020	Champions of the Future — OK	Birel ART Racing	29th
2020	Karting World Championship — OK	Birel ART Racing	12th
2020	WSK Open Cup — OK	Birel ART Racing	12th
2021	WSK Champions Cup — OK	Birel ART Racing	15th
2021	WSK Super Master Series — OK	Birel ART Racing	18th
2021	WSK Euro Series — OK	Birel ART Racing	13th
2021	Karting European Championship — OK	Birel ART Racing	30th
2021	Italian Karting Championship — OK	Alessandro Bertuca	4th
2021	Champions of the Future — OK	Birel ART Racing	26th
2021	WSK Open Cup — OK	Birel ART Racing	4th
2021	Karting World Championship — OK	Birel ART Racing	18th
2021	South Garda Winter Cup — OK	Birel ART Racing	11th
2021	SKUSA SuperNationals — X30 Senior	PSL Karting	48th
2022	WSK Super Master Series — OK	Birel ART Racing	17th
2022	Champions of the Future Winter Series — OK	Birel ART Racing	35th
2022	Champions of the Future Euro Series — OK	Birel ART Racing	24th
2022	Karting European Championship — OK	Birel ART Racing	29th
2022	Karting European Championship — KZ2	Birel ART Racing	4th
2022	WSK Euro Series — KZ2	Birel ART Racing	21st
2022	Italian Karting Championship — KZ2		18th
2022	WSK Euro Series — OK	Birel ART Racing	61st
2022	Karting World Cup — KZ2	Birel ART Racing	2nd
2022	Karting World Championship — OK	Birel ART Racing	37th
2022	WSK Open Cup — KZ2	Birel ART Racing	28th
2022	WSK Final Cup — KZ2	Birel ART Racing	8th
2022	SKUSA SuperNationals — Pro Shifter	PSL Karting	8th
2023	South Garda Winter Cup — KZ2	KCS Racing Team	11th
2023	WSK Champions Cup — KZ2	Birel ART Racing	1st
2023	WSK Super Master Series — KZ2	Birel ART Racing	1st
2023	Andrea Margutti Trophy — KZ2	KCS	1st
2023	Italian Karting Championship — KZ2	LG Motorsport	2nd
2023	Karting European Championship — KZ2	Birel ART Racing	4th
2023	WSK Open Series — KZ2	Birel ART Racing	15th
2023	Karting World Cup — KZ2	Birel ART Racing	35th
2023	Trofeo Delle Industrie — KZ2	Birel ART Racing	3rd
2023	Deutsche Kart-Meisterschaft — KZ2	Birel ART Racing	NC
2023	WSK Final Cup — KZ2	Birel ART Racing	3rd
2024	WSK Champions Cup — KZ2	Birel ART Racing	3rd
2024	WSK Super Master Series — KZ2	Birel ART Racing	1st
2024	Andrea Margutti Trophy — KZ2	KCS Racing	34th
2024	WSK Open Series — KZ2	Birel ART Racing	1st
2024	Karting European Championship — KZ2	Birel ART Racing	19th
2024	Champions of the Future Shifters — KZ2	Birel ART Racing	6th
2024	Karting World Cup — KZ2	Birel ART Racing	1st
2024	WSK Final Cup — KZ2	Birel ART Racing	4th
2024	SKUSA SuperNationals — Pro Shifter	PSL Karting	6th
2025	WSK Super Master Series — KZ2	Birel ART Racing	2nd
2025	Andrea Margutti Trophy — KZ2	KCS	1st
2025	Champions of the Future Shifters — KZ	Birel ART Racing	7th
2025	Karting European Championship — KZ	Birel ART Racing	4th
2025	Karting World Championship — KZ	Birel ART Racing	7th
2025	WSK Final Cup — KZ2	Birel ART Racing	1st
2025	SKUSA SuperNationals — Pro Shifter	PSL Karting	6th
2025	Trofeo Delle Industrie — KZ2	KCS Racing	1st
2026	WSK Super Master Series — KZ2	Birel ART Racing	4th
2026	Andrea Margutti Trophy — KZ2	Birel ART Racing	1st
2026	Karting European Championship — KZ	Birel ART Racing	20th*

== Racing record ==
=== Racing career summary ===
Season	Series	Team	Races	Wins	Poles	F/Laps	Podiums	Points	Position
2026	Porsche Carrera Cup Italy	Omnia Motorsport	10	0	0	0	0	39	13th

=== Complete Porsche Carrera Cup Italy results ===
(key) (Races in bold indicate pole position; races in italics indicate fastest lap)

Year	Team	1	2	3	4	5	6	7	8	9	10	11	12	Pos.	Points
2026	Omnia Motorsport	IMO; 1; 8	IMO; 2; 15	MIS1; 1; 16	MIS1; 2; 6	MNZ; 1; 10	MNZ; 2; 26	VAL; 1; 10	VAL; 2; 14	MIS2; 1	MIS2; 2	MUG; 1; 13	MUG; 2; 13	13th	39
