= Italian Karting Championship =

Italian kart racing series

The Italian ACI Karting Championship (Italian: Campionato Italiano ACI Karting) is a kart racing series based in Italy. From 1998 to 2010, it was known as the Italian Open Masters.

== History ==
The Italian Championship was founded by the Automobile Club d'Italia in 1961. The Italian Open Masters was later founded in 1997. In 2011, it was rebranded to the Italian ACI Karting Championship. The fourth round of the 2025 season at Cremona had a record attendance of 312 drivers from 52 nations.

== Champions ==
=== Formula A/KF1 ===
Season	Driver	Constructor
2000	(Italy) Stefano Fabi	Swiss Hultess
2001	(Italy) Stefano Fabi	Top Kart
2002	(France) Jean-Philippe Guignet	Tony Kart
2003	(France) Manuel Renaudie	PCR Motorsport Competition Technology
2004	(Italy) Davide Forè	Tony Kart
2005	(Italy) Marco Ardigò	Tony Kart
2006	(Denmark) Nikolaj Bollingtoft	Tony Kart
2007	(United Kingdom) Gary Catt	Tony Kart
2008	(Italy) Marco Ardigò	Tony Kart

=== Intercontinental A/KF2/OK/OKN ===
Season	Driver	Constructor
2000	(Italy) Alessandro Bonetti	Swiss Hultess
2001	(Italy) Jean-Philippe Guignet	Tony Kart
2002	(Italy) Michele Fanetti	Birel
2003	(Denmark) Nikolai Bollingtoft	Tony Kart
2004	(Netherlands) Henkie Waldschmidt	CRG
2005	(Portugal) Armando Parente	CRG
2006	(Italy) Antonio Piccioni	Tony Kart
2007	(United Kingdom) Will Stevens	Tony Kart
2008	(Italy) Matteo Ghidella	
2009	(Italy) Vittorio Ghirelli	Tony Kart
2010	(Italy) Riccardo Cinti	
2011	(Italy) Alessio Santilli	Intrepid
2012	(Italy) Federico Pezzolla	Kosmic
2013	(France) Julien Darras	Tony Kart
2014	(Italy) Marco Maestranzi	Top Kart
2015	(Italy) Jacopo Gheno	Tony Kart
2020	(Italy) Andrea Kimi Antonelli	Kart Republic
2021	(Italy) Andrea Alfio Spina	Parolin
2022	(Brazil) Gabriel Gomez	CRG
2023	(Czech Republic) Eliška Bábíčková	Exprit
2024	(Italy) Federico Rossi	Tony Kart
2025	(Italy) Manuel Scognamiglio	Kart Republic
2026	(Italy) Manuel Scognamiglio	Kart Republic

=== Intercontinental A Junior/KF3/KFJ/OKJ/OKJN/OKN-Junior ===
Season	Driver	Constructor
2000	(France) Jean-Philippe Guignet	Tony Kart
2001	(Germany) Nico Hülkenberg	CRG Holland
2002	(Germany) Nico Hülkenberg	CRG Holland
2003	(Switzerland) Sébastien Buemi	Intrepid
2004	(Austria) Philipp Eng	Top Kart
2005	(Spain) Albert Costa	Intrepid
2006	(United Kingdom) Scott Jenkins	Intrepid
2007	(United Kingdom) Jack Harvey	Maranello
2008	(Italy) Kevin Ceccon	Gandolfi Ennio Racing
2009	(Italy) Gianmarco Ercoli	Tony Kart
2010	(Italy) Paolo Ippolito	
2011	(Italy) Federico Pezzolla	Intrepid
2012	(Italy) Alessio Lorandi	Tony Kart
2013	(Italy) Alessio Lorandi	Tony Kart
2014	(Italy) Remigo Garofano	Tony Kart
2015	(Italy) Alessandro Giardelli	Tony Kart
2016	(Italy) Marzio Moretti	Exprit
2017	(Russia) Alexey Brizhan	Tony Kart
2018	(Italy) Tommaso Chiappini	Formula K
2019	(Russia) Nikita Bedrin	Tony Kart
2020	(Italy) Andrea Alfio Spina	Tony Kart
2021	(Russia) Kirill Dzitiev	Kart Republic
2022	(Algeria) Leo Robinson	LN Kart
2022	(Austria) Niklas Schaufler	Kart Republic
2023	(Italy) Gino Rocchio	DR-Moderna
2024	(Italy) Cristian Blandino	TM Kart
2025	(Italy) Gioele Girardello	TM Kart
2026	(United States) Josh Bergman	Kart Republic

=== Intercontinental C/KZ2 ===
Season	Driver	Constructor
2000	(Italy) Alessandro	Top Kart
2001	(Italy) Christian Montanari	Birel
2002	(Italy) Alessandro Piccini	Parolin
2003	(Italy) Francesco Laudato	Birel
2004	(Italy) Alessandro Manetti	CRG
2005	(Italy) Francesco Laudato	Birel
2006	(Italy) Alessandro Manetti	Intrepid
2007	(Italy) Marco Ardigò	Tony Kart
2008	(Finland) Simo Puhakka	Renda Motorsport
2009	(Italy) Riccardo Piccoli	CKR
2010	(Italy) Nicola Nolé	
2011	(Italy) Fabian Federer	CRG
2012	(Italy) Alessandro Giulietti	Intrepid
2013	(Italy) Alessandro Giulietti	Intrepid
2014	(Italy) Lorenzo Camplese	Maranello
2015	(Italy) Marco Pastacaldi	CRG
2016	(Italy) Francesco Celenta	Formula k
2017	(Italy) Marco Zanchetta	Maranello
2018	(Italy) Giacomo Pollini	Formula K
2019	(Italy) Simone Cunati	CRG
2020	(Italy) Giuseppe Palomba	
2021	(Italy) Giuseppe Palomba	
2022	(Italy) Danilo Albanese	
2023	Maksim Orlov	Parolin
2024	(Italy) Cristian Bertuca	Birel ART
2025	(Italy) Riccardo Longhi	Birel ART
2026	(Romania) Daniel Vasile	Maranello

=== KZ2 Under 18 ===
Season	Driver	Constructor
2025	(Finland) Kimi Tani	Parolin
2026	(Finland) Kimi Tani	Parolin

=== KZ2 Master 35 ===
Season	Driver	Constructor
2025	(Italy) Angelo Lombardo	TM Kart
2026	(Italy) Davide Forè	

=== Intercontinental 60 Mini ===
Season	Driver	Constructor
2009	(Italy) Pierfrancesco Benedetti	
2010	(Italy) Lorenzo Scatà	
2011	(Italy) Remigio Garofano	
2012	(Italy) Leonardo Lorandi	Tony Kart
2013	(Italy) Nicola Abrusci	Tony Kart
2014	(Italy) Giuseppe Fusco	Lenzo
2015	(Norway) Dennis Hauger	Hero
2016	(Italy) Gabriele Minì	Energy
2017	(Italy) Gabriele Minì	Parolin
2018	(Norway) Martinius Stenshorne	Parolin
2019	(United Kingdom) William Macintyre	Parolin
2020	(Italy) Salvatore Alfio Sardo	Intrepid
2021	(Italy) Gino Rocchio	Kart Republic
2022	(Italy) Edoardo Mario Sulpizio	EKS

=== 60 Baby/Formula 60 ===
Season	Driver	Constructor
2011	(Italy) Cosimo Narciso	Intrepid
2012	(Italy) Salvatore Corso	Henzo
2013	(Italy) Santo Macaluso	Birel
2015	(Italy) Alfio Spina	Tony Kart

=== MINI Gr.3 ===
Season	Driver	Constructor
2020	(Japan) Kean Nakamura-Berta	Kart Republic
2021	(Czech Republic) Jindrich Pesl	Parolin
2022	(Italy) Iacopo Martinese	Parolin
2023	(United Kingdom) Noah Baglin	Kart Republic
2024	(Italy) Julian Frasnelli	Parolin
2025	(Scotland) Mason Robertson	Kart Republic
2026	(United Kingdom) Alfie Mair	Tony Kart

=== MINI U10 ===
Season	Driver	Constructor
2023	(Poland) Leonardo Gorski	Parolin
2024	(Italy) Niccolò Perico	Energy
2025	(Ukraine) Platon Kovtunenko	Kart Republic
2026	(United States) Zayne Burgess	Parolin
