= WSK Euro Series =

International kart racing competition in Italy

- Category: Kart racing
- Region: International
- Affiliations: WSK Promotion; Automobile Club d'Italia; CIK-FIA
- Inaugural season: 2010; 16 years ago
- Classes: OK, OK-J, KZ2, OK-N, OKN-J, Mini Gr.3, Mini U10
- Drivers' champion: (Indonesia) Qarrar Firhand; (OK, Parolin–TM); (Czech Republic) Zdeněk Bábíček; (OK-J, Tony Kart–IAME); Maksim Orlov; (KZ2, Sodi–TM); (Italy) Andrea Giudice; (OK-N, Tony Kart–Vortex); (Sweden) Elton Hedfors; (OKN-J, Parolin–TM); (United Kingdom) Alfie Mair; (Mini Gr.3, Tony Kart–Vortex); (France) Sasha Miras y Muñoz; (Mini U10, Parolin–IAME)
- Most titles: (Netherlands) Max Verstappen (3)
- Official website: wskarting.it

The WSK Euro Series is a kart racing competition organised by WSK Promotion and sanctioned by ACI Sport. Hosted annually since 2010, it is one of 11 competitions on the international kart racing calendar in CIK-FIA classes.

The three-round championship is held across Italy in seven classes: OK, OK-J, KZ2, OK-N, OKN-J, Mini Gr.3, and U10. It was previously contested in KZ, KF, and KF-J.

Notable champions have been Formula One drivers Charles Leclerc, Lando Norris, Kimi Antonelli, and four-time World Drivers' Champion Max Verstappen, as well as four-time IndyCar Series champion Álex Palou.

== KZ1 Champions ==
Year	Champion	Chassis	Engine	Tyre	Second place	Third place	Class
2010	(Belgium) Jonathan Thonon	CRG	Maxter	D	(Netherlands) Bas Lammers	(Belgium) Rick Dreezen	KZ1
2011	(Belgium) Rick Dreezen	Tony Kart	Vortex	D	(Netherlands) Bas Lammers	(Italy) Antonio Piccioni	KZ1
2012	(Netherlands) Jorrit Pex	CRG	TM	B	(Belgium) Rick Dreezen	(France) Arnaud Kozlinski	KZ1
2013	(Netherlands) Max Verstappen	CRG	TM	B	(United Kingdom) Ben Hanley	(Belgium) Jonathan Thonon	KZ1

== KZ2 Champions ==
Year	Champion	Chassis	Engine	Tyre	Second place	Third place	Class	Source
2010	(Italy) Paolo De Conto	Energy	TM	D	(Netherlands) Beitske Visser	(Belgium) Rick Dreezen	KZ2	
2011	(Sweden) Joel Johansson	Energy	TM	V	(Italy) Mirko Torsellini	(Netherlands) Ryan vam de Burgt	KZ2	
2012	(Lithuania) Simas Juodvirsis	Energy	TM	D	(Italy) Riccardo Negro	(Canada) Phillip Orcic	KZ2	
2013	(Italy) Riccardo Negro	DR	TM	B	(Italy) Marco Zanchetta	(Czech Republic) Jan Midria	KZ2	
2019	(Italy) Marco Ardigò	Tony Kart	Vortex	B	(Finland) Simo Puhakka	(Netherlands) Marijn Kremers	KZ2	
2020	(Italy) Riccardo Longhi	Birel ART	TM	V	(Italy) Giuseppe Palomba	(Italy) Alessandro Irlando	KZ2	
2022	(Italy) Riccardo Longhi	Birel ART	TM	V	(Netherlands) Marijn Kremers	(Italy) Giuseppe Palomba	KZ2	

== SKF/KF1 Champions ==
Year	Champion	Chassis	Engine	Tyre	Second place	Third place	Class	Source
2010	(France) Armand Convers	Kosmic	Vortex	V	(Netherlands) Nyck de Vries	(Italy) Marco Ardigo	SKF	
2011	(Netherlands) Nyck de Vries	Zanardi	Parilla	V	(Thailand) Alexander Albon	(Belgium) Sebastien Bailly	KF1	

== KF2/KF/OK Champions ==
Year	Champion	Chassis	Engine	Tyre	Second place	Third place	Class	Source
2010	(Italy) Ignazio D'Agosto	Tony Kart	Vortex	V	(Denmark) Nicolaj Møller Madsen	(Denmark) Jacob Nørtoft	KF2	
2011	(Italy) Stefano Cucco	Birel ART	Parilla	V	(Belgium) Sami Luka	(Russia) Egor Orudzhev	KF2	
2012	(Monaco) Charles Leclerc	Birel ART	Parilla	V	(Italy) Felice Tiene	(Italy) Antonio Fuoco	KF2	
2013	(France) Dorian Boccolacci	Energy	TM	V	(Denmark) Nicklas Nielsen	(United Kingdom) Ben Barnicoat	KF	
2019	(Italy) Lorenzo Travisanutto	Kart Republic	IAME	B	(Sweden) Dino Beganovic	(United Kingdom) Dexter Patterson	OK	
2020	(Italy) Andrea Kimi Antonelli	Kart Republic	IAME	L	(Finland) Juho Valtanen	(United Kingdom) Joe Turney	OK	
2021	(United Kingdom) Arvid Lindblad	Kart Republic	IAME	L	(United States) Ugo Ugochukwu	(Poland) Tymek Kucharczyk	OK	
2022	(Japan) Kean Nakamura-Berta	Kart Republic	IAME	V	(France) Enzo Deligny	(Finland) Tuukka Taponen	OK	
2023	Kirill Kutskov	Kart Republic	IAME	L	Anatoly Khavalkin	Dmitry Matveev	OK	
2024	(Sweden) Scott Lindblom	Kart Republic	IAME	L	(Spain) Christian Costoya	(Sweden) Oliver Kinnmark	OK	
2025	(Spain) Cristian Costoya	Parolin	TM	L	(Italy) Filippo Sala	(Sweden) Oliver Kinnmark	OK	

== OK-N Champions ==
Year	Champion	Chassis	Engine	Tyre	Second place	Third place	Class	Source
2023	(Turkey) Bati Ege Yildirim	Kart Republic	IAME	V	(Italy) Antonio Apicella	(Italy) Federico Lenzo	OK-N	
2024	(Poland) Juliusz Ociepa	Lenzokart	LKE	V	(Turkey) Bati Ege Yildirim	(Italy) Nicolas Marchesi	OK-N	
2025	(Italy) Manuel Scognamiglio	Kart Republic	IAME	V	(Finland) Mike Parhiala	(Italy) Lorenzo d’Amico	OK-N	

== KF3/KF Junior/OK Junior Champions ==
Year	Champion	Chassis	Engine	Tyre	Second place	Third place	Class	Source
2010	(Netherlands) Max Verstappen	CRG	Maxter	D	(Thailand) Alexander Albon	(Netherlands) Peter Hoevenaars	KF3	
2011	(Netherlands) Max Verstappen	CRG	Parilla	V	(France) Esteban Ocon	(Norway) Dennis Olsen	KF3	
2012	(Spain) Álex Palou	CRG	BMB	V	(United Kingdom) Callum Ilott	(Italy) Alessio Lorandi	KF3	
2013	(United Kingdom) Lando Norris	FA Kart	Vortex	V	(Italy) Alessio Lorandi	(Germany) David Beckmann	KFJ	
2019	(Italy) Andrea Kimi Antonelli	Kart Republic	IAME	V	(Netherlands) Thomas ten Brinke	(Russia) Nikita Bedrin	OKJ	
2020	(Italy) Alfio Spina	Tony Kart	Vortex	V	(Italy) Brando Badoer	(Czech Republic) Igor Cepil	OKJ	
2021	(United Kingdom) Harley Keeble	Tony Kart	Vortex	V	(Jamaica) Alex Powell	(United Kingdom) Freddie Slater	OKJ	
2022	(Poland) Jan Przyrowski	Tony Kart	Vortex	V	(Poland) Maciej Gładysz	(Russia) Kirill Kutskov	OKJ	
2023	(Italy) Iacopo Martinese	Kart Republic	IAME	V	(Germany) Taym Saleh	(Austria) Niklas Schaufler	OKJ	
2024	(United States) Jack Iliffe	Exprit	TM	V	(United Kingdom) Roman Kamyab	(United States) Devin Walz	OKJ	
2025	(Turkey) Iskender Zulfikari	Exprit	TM	V	(United Kingdom) Henry Domain	(Monaco) Andrea Manni	OKJ	

== OKN-Junior Champions ==
Year	Champion	Chassis	Engine	Tyre	Second place	Third place	Class	Source
2023	(Netherlands) Dean Hoogendoorn	Kart Republic	IAME	V	(United Kingdom) Jesse Phillips	(Poland) Bruno Gryc	OKN-Junior	
2024	(Netherlands) Billy Jordan van Staveren	Parolin	TM	V	(Australia) Sebastian Eskandari-Mirandi	(Brazil) Antonio Reginal Pizzonia Neto	OKN-Junior	
2025	(China) Huifei Xie	Kart Republic	IAME	V	(Italy) Gioele Girardello	(Switzerland) Albert Tamm	OKN-Junior	

== 60 Mini/Mini Gr3 Champions ==
Year	Champion	Chassis	Engine	Tyre	Second place	Third place	Class	Source
2012	(Italy) Leonardo Lorandi	Tony Kart	LKE	L	(Spain) Eliseo Martinez	(United States) Logan Sargeant	60 Mini	
2013	(Spain) Eliseo Martinez	Hero	LKE	L	(India) Kush Maini	(Greece) Konstantinos	60 Mini	
2019	(United Arab Emirates) Rashid Al Dhaheri	Parolin	TM	V	(United Kingdom) William Macintyre	(Belgium) Douwe Dedecker	60 Mini	
2020	(Netherlands) René Lammers	Parolin	TM	V	(Japan) Kean Nakamura-Berta	(Poland) Jan Przyrowski	60 Mini	
2021	(Spain) Christian Costoya	Parolin	TM	V	(Russia) Vladimir Ivannikov	(Italy) Emanuele Olivieri	60 Mini	
2022	(Italy) Iacopo Martinese	Parolin	IAME	V	(Spain) Christian Costoya	(Russia) Vladimir Ivannikov	60 Mini	
2023	(Romania) Cosma Cristofor Bogdan	Kart Republic	IAME	V	(Australia) William Calleja	(United States) Devin Walz	Mini Gr3	
2024	(Netherlands) Daniel Miron Lorente	Kart Republic	IAME	V	(United States) Alessandro Truchot	(Ukraine) Oleksandr Legenkyi	Mini Gr3	
2025	(Sweden) Elton Hedfors	Parolin	TM	V	(France) Stan Ratajski	(Italy) Achille Rea	Mini Gr3	

== Mini U10 Champions ==
Year	Champion	Chassis	Engine	Tyre	Second place	Third place	Class	Source
2023	(Spain) Daniel Miron Lorente	Kart Republic	IAME	V	(Ukraine) Oleksandr Legenkyi	(Belgium) Antoine Venant	Mini U10	
2024	(Scotland) Mason Robertson	Parolin	IAME	V	(Italy) Niccolò Perico	(Italy) Lorenzo di Pietrantonio	Mini U10	
2025	(Netherlands) Wynn Godschalk	Kart Republic	IAME	V	(Ukraine) Platon Kovtunenko	(Mexico) Mateo Garcia Patino	Mini U10	

== See also ==
- WSK Champions Cup
- WSK Super Master Series
- WSK Final Cup
