= Kumpen =

Kumpen is a surname. Notable people with the surname include:

- Anthony Kumpen (born 1978), Belgian racing driver and team manager
- Sophie Kumpen (born 1975), Belgian racing driver and kart racer
