= 2011 WSK Euro Series =

The 2011 WSK Euro Series in KF3 class was the 2nd season of the WSK Euro Series, an international karting championship. Max Verstappen clinched the title for the second year in a row, despite not participating in one round due to the injuries. Esteban Ocon finished second and Dennis Olsen finished third.

== KF3 Standings ==
Prefinal race points

Points are awarded to the top 12.

Position	1st	2nd	3rd	4th	5th	6th	7th	8th	9th	10th	11th	12th
Points	35	20	10	9	8	7	6	5	4	3	2	1

Final race points

Points are awarded to the top 15.

Position	1st	2nd	3rd	4th	5th	6th	7th	8th	9th	10th	11th	12th	13th	14th	15th
Points	50	30	20	15	12	10	9	8	7	6	5	4	3	2	1

=== Championship top 10 ===
Pos	Driver	SAR (Italy)		POR (Portugal)		LA (Italy)		ZUE (Spain)		Pts
Pos	Driver	PF	F	PF	F	PF	F	PF	F	Pts
1	(Netherlands) Max Verstappen	2	2	1	1	WD	WD	1	5	182
2	(France) Esteban Ocon	8	1	7	27	2	3	7	3	127
3	(Norway) Dennis Olsen	7	11	6	2	5	1	16	DNS	106
4	(Denmark) Nicolai Sylvest	12	16	Ret	3	14	Ret	3	1	81
5	(South Africa) Callan O'Keeffe	1	3	20	11	Ret	13	4	12	76
6	(Denmark) Nicklas Nielsen	17	18	14	5	11	6	2	2	74
7	(United Kingdom) George Russell	4	Ret	DNQ	DNQ	1	9	18	20	51
8	(Italy) Antonio Fuoco	DNQ	DNQ	2	13	3	4			48
9	(Canada) Lance Stroll	Ret	19	5	Ret	7	2	20	21	44
10	(United Kingdom) Harrison Scott	6	5	8	4	Ret	Ret	10	27	42
