= Sophie Kumpen =

Belgian racing driver (born 1975)

- Born: Sophie-Marie Kumpen; 30 October 1975 (age 51); Hasselt, Limburg, Belgium
- Occupations: Racing driver; kart racer; social worker
- Spouse: Jos Verstappen (m. 1996; div. 2008)
- Children: 2, including Max
- Parent: Robert Kumpen (father)
- Relatives: Paul Kumpen (uncle); Anthony Kumpen (cousin)
- Nationality: (Belgium) Belgian

Karting World Championship career
- Years active: 1991–1995
- Teams: Tecno, Tony Kart, CRG
- Starts: 5
- Wins: 0
- Podiums: 0
- Poles: 0
- Fastest laps: 0
- Best finish: 9th in 1991 (FA)

Championship titles
- 1995: Andrea Margutti Trophy

Sophie-Marie Kumpen (Note: Also known as Marie-Sophie Kumpen.) (born 30 October 1975) is a Belgian former racing driver and kart racer. She is the former wife of Dutch Formula One driver Jos Verstappen, and mother to four-time World Drivers' Champion Max Verstappen.

Born and raised in Hasselt, Kumpen is the daughter of Robert Kumpen, former chairman of KRC Genk, and the cousin of racing driver Anthony. Kumpen began her career in kart racing, competing at five Karting World Championships, winning two Belgian Championships, and winning the Andrea Margutti Trophy in 1995, becoming the third woman in history to win an international karting title after Susanna Raganelli and Cathy Muller. She married Jos Verstappen the following year and retired from racing upon the birth of her son Max in September 1997.

Kumpen returned to racing in 2013, competing in the Formido Swift Cup in the Netherlands before suffering a career-ending injury at Zandvoort. Since retiring from motor racing, Kumpen has taken up a career as a social worker at the OCMW in Maaseik.

== Early life ==
Sophie-Marie Kumpen was born on 30 October 1975 in Hasselt, Belgium. She is the daughter of Robert Kumpen, former chairman of association football club KRC Genk. Her uncle, Paul Kumpen, and his son, Anthony, were both rally and racing drivers, respectively. Paul is the former co-owner of Ridley Bikes and founder of PK Carsport, and Anthony is a two-time champion of the NASCAR Whelen Euro Series.

== Racing career ==
=== Karting (1987–1995) ===
Influenced by her family, Kumpen started kart racing at the age 11. She had a successful career in karting, racing in international competition against future Formula One drivers such as Jenson Button, Nick Heidfeld, Jarno Trulli and Giancarlo Fisichella, among others. Described as a "prodigy" by Vroomkart, Kumpen competed in four editions of the Karting World Championship from 1991 to 1994, finishing ninth in the Formula A class in the former. She was acclaimed internationally as a top competitor in karting, known for her smooth driving style and ability to set consistent lap times.

Kumpen achieved her only major victory at the Andrea Margutti Trophy in 1995 with CRG, making her one of five women in history to win a major senior international karting title alongside Susanna Raganelli, (Note: World Championship, 1966) Cathy Muller, (Note: European Championship, 100 cc, 1979) Beitske Visser, (Note: WSK Master Series, KZ2, 2010) and Luna Fluxá. (Note: Champions of the Future, OK-N, 2024) Former McLaren driver David Coulthard and Jordan Grand Prix owner Eddie Jordan both remarked that Kumpen had the potential to make it into Formula One. Red Bull team principal and former racing driver Christian Horner, who raced against Kumpen in the 1989 Junior World Cup, described her as being "very good" and "top 10 in the world", whilst Button described her as "fantastic".

=== Touring car racing (1995–2013) ===
Kumpen progressed to touring car racing in the mid-1990s, but her career was cut short following her marriage to Jos Verstappen in 1996, as well as a crash she suffered whilst racing an Opel Lotus.

In 2013, Kumpen returned for a short time as a driver in the Formido Swift Cup. During the final races at Circuit Zandvoort, home of the Dutch Grand Prix, she crashed and broke a vertebra, ending her racing career aged 37.

== Personal life ==
Kumpen married Formula One driver Jos Verstappen in 1996, retiring from racing that year to focus on raising their children and assisting her husband in his career as a racing driver. Both their children, Max and Victoria, also took up kart racing, with the former eventually joining Kumpen's CRG team and winning a record three FIA Karting Championships in a single season. Max went on to win the Formula One World Drivers' Championship in 2021, becoming the first Dutch driver to win the title.

Kumpen and Verstappen separated in 2008. In December that year, Verstappen appeared in court in Tongeren, charged with assaulting Kumpen. He was found not guilty of assault, but guilty of threatening Kumpen in text messages and of violating a previously issued restraining order. Verstappen was fined and sentenced to three months probation. Throughout their marriage, Kumpen and Verstappen had been close personal friends with Michael Schumacher and Corinna Betsch.

After her sporting career, Kumpen started working as a social worker at the OCMW in Maaseik. She has regularly attended Formula One Grands Prix to watch her son Max, but has admitted his racing career has worried her due to past incidents that ended her career. Kumpen is fluent in five languages: Dutch, German, English, French and Italian, the latter she learned whilst racing for CRG.

== Karting record ==
=== Karting career summary ===
Season	Series	Team	Position
1991	Belgian Championship — ICA	GKS Lemmens Power	1st
1991	CIK-FIA World Championship — FA	GKS Lemmens Power	9th
1992	CIK-FIA World Cup — FK	GKS Lemmens Power	13th
1992	CIK-FIA World Championship — FK	GKS Lemmens Power	26th
1993	CIK-FIA World Cup — FSA	Tony Kart	24th
1993	CIK-FIA World Championship — FSA	Tony Kart	29th
1993	Japan International Kart Grand Prix — FSA	Tony Kart	NC
1994	Andrea Margutti Trophy — FA	CRG	NC
1994	Belgian Championship — FA	CRG	1st
1994	CIK-FIA World Cup — FSA	CRG	30th
1994	CIK-FIA World Championship — FSA	CRG	17th
1994	Japan International Kart Grand Prix — FSA	CRG	2nd
1995	Andrea Margutti Trophy — FA	CRG	1st
1995	CIK-FIA World Championship — FSA	Tecno	32nd
