= List of FIA championships =

This is a list of international motorsport championships, trophies and cups administered and regulated by the Fédération Internationale de l'Automobile (FIA), the international governing body of motorsport. The FIA awards the winners titles and/or trophies to the competitors, while working with other promoters who may arrange the commercial affairs of the series.

The FIA identifies a championship in its International Sporting Code as either a series of competitions or a single competition. The sporting regulations for each championship declares the specific titles to be awarded to participants within, thus differentiating for example, the World Endurance Championship with a specific title World Endurance Championship for GTE Drivers.

== World championships ==
Six current series are sanctioned as World Championships:

Series	Years active	World championship titles	Promoter (Commercial rights holder)
FIA Formula One World Championship	1950–present	Drivers (1950–present); Constructors (1958–present)	Formula One Group
FIA Karting World Championship	1964–present	OK (2016–present); OK-Junior (2016–present); KZ (2013–present)	RGMMC Group
FIA World Rally Championship	1973–present	Manufacturers (1973–present); Drivers (1979–present); Co-drivers (1982–present)	WRC Promoter GmbH
FIA World Rally-Raid Championship	2022–present	Drivers (2022–present); Manufacturers (2022–present)	Amaury Sport Organisation
FIA World Endurance Championship	2012–present	Drivers (2012–); Manufacturers (2012–2017, 2022–present); Hypercar Teams (2023–present); LMGT3 Drivers (2024–present); LMGT3 Teams (2024–present)	Automobile Club de l'Ouest
ABB FIA Formula E World Championship	2020/21–present	Drivers (2020/21–present); Teams (2020/21–present); Manufacturers (2023/24–present)	Formula E Holdings Limited

== Current ==
All information in this section of current FIA competitions is taken directly from the official FIA website.

Circuit
FIA Formula One World Championship
FIA World Endurance Championship
ABB FIA Formula E World Championship
FIA Formula 2 Championship
FIA Formula 3 Championship
FIA Formula Regional European Championship
FIA FR World Cup
FIA F4 World Cup
FIA GT World Cup
Formula Regional Championships Certified By FIA: Americas, Japanese, Indian, Oceania and Middle East
Formula 4 Championships Certified by FIA: French, British, CEZ, Chinese, Italian, Japanese, NACAM, South East Asia, Spanish, UAE, United States, Indian, Brazilian and Saudi Arabia
Goodyear FIA European Truck Racing Championship
FIA Intercontinental Drifting Cup
FIA Central Asia Drifting Cup
FIA European Drag Racing Championship
Kumho FIA TCR World Tour
FIA TCR World Ranking Final

Rallies
FIA World Rally Championship
FIA European Rally Championship
FIA African Rally Championship
FIA Asia-Pacific Rally Championship
FIA Codasur Rally Championship
FIA Middle East Rally Championship
FIA NACAM Rally Championship
FIA EcoRally Cup
FIA European Rally Trophy
FIA Rally Star

Cross-Country
FIA World Rally-Raid Championship
FIA World Baja Cup
FIA European Baja Cup
FIA Middle East Baja Cup

Off-Road
FIA Rallycross World Cup
FIA European Rallycross Championship
FIA European Autocross And Cross Car Championships
FIA Extreme H World Cup

Hill Climb
FIA European Hill Climb Championship
FIA Historic Hill Climb Championship

Historic
FIA European Historic Rally Championship
FIA Historic Hill Climb Championship

Esports
FIA Certified Gran Turismo Championships
Olympic Esports Series
Motorsport Games: Digital Cup
FIA F4 Esports Global Championship
FIA Esports Global Rally Tour
FIA MENA Esports Championship

Karting
Mondokart.com FIA Karting World Championship
Mondokart.com FIA Karting European Championship
FIA Karting World Cup
FIA Karting International Super Cup
FIA Karting Asia-Pacific Championship
FIA Karting South American Championship
FIA Karting Arrive & Drive European Championship
FIA Karting Arrive & Drive Asia-Pacific Championship

Land Speed Records
FIA World Land Speed Records

International Events
FIA Motorsport Games

== Former ==
- FIA World Sportscar Championship
- FIA Sportscar Championship
- FIA International Formula 3000
- FIA Formula Two Championship
- FIA Formula 3 International Trophy
- FIA Formula 3 Intercontinental Cup
- FIA Formula 3 World Cup
- FIA European Formula Three Cup
- FIA GT Championship
- FIA GT1 World Championship
- FIA GT Series
- FIA GT Nations Cup
- FIA Touring Car World Cup
- FIA World Touring Car Championship
- FIA European Touring Car Cup
- GP2 Series
- GP3 Series
- FIA World Touring Car Cup
- FIA Alternative Energies Cup
- FIA Junior World Rally Championship
- FIA Super 2000 World Rally Championship
- FIA Production World Rally Championship
