= Susanna Raganelli =

Italian racing driver (born 1946)

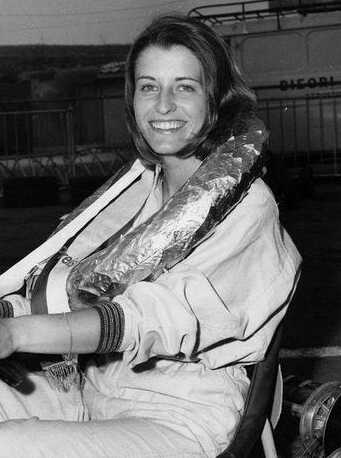
- Raganelli at the 1966 CIK-FIA World Championship
- Born: 21 February 1946 (age 80); Rome, Italy
- Spouse: Giancarlo Naddeo
- Nationality: (Italy) Italian

Karting World Championship career
- Years active: 1965–1967
- Teams: Tecno
- Starts: 3
- Championships: 1 (1966)
- Podiums: 1
- Best finish: 1st in 1966 (100cc)

Susanna "Susy" Raganelli (born 21 February 1946) is an Italian former racing driver and kart racer. Raganelli won the Karting World Championship in 1966 with Tecno, and remains the only woman to have won a four-wheel World Championship.

Raganelli was born on 21 February 1946 in Rome, Italy. Her father, Cesare Raganelli, was a local Alfa Romeo car dealer. From the 1970s until his death in 2021, Raganelli was married to fellow racing driver Giancarlo Naddeo, who won the Italian Formula Three Championship in 1971. She encouraged Naddeo to retire from single-seater racing after an accident saw him suffer a broken leg and fractured skull.

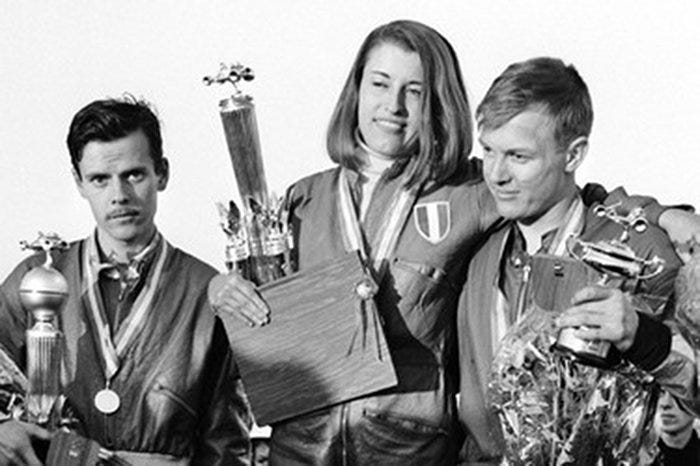
Raganelli (centre) won the CIK-FIA World Championship in 1966 and remains the only woman to win an FIA World Championship.

In 1965, Raganelli won the karting Italian 100cc Super championship, and in 1966 helped her countrymen win the European Nation's Championship. Raganelli won the 100 cc Karting World Championship in 1966 in a Tecno–Parilla, beating Leif Engström and Ronnie Peterson, and remains the only woman to have won a four-wheel World Championship. Tecno co-founder Gianfranco Pederzani later remarked in Autosprint that Raganelli was the only driver who could compete with Peterson, who twice finished runner-up in the Formula One World Drivers' Championship. Raganelli also raced for Alfa Romeo, driving the Alfa Romeo GTA. She was the "first Italian buyer" of the Alfa Romeo 33 Stradale, of which only 12 were produced.

== Awards and honours ==
- Italian National Olympic Committee
  - Gold Medal of Athletic Valour: 1966
  - Silver Medal of Athletic Valour: 1965
