= Luca Corberi =

Italian former karting driver

- Born: August 6, 1997 (age 28) Brescia, Italy

FIA Karting World Championship career
- Years active: 2008–2020

Championship titles
- CIK-FIA Karting World Cup Champion (KF3 class, 2012)

Luca Corberi (born 14 August 1997) is an Italian former kart racing driver. He is best known for winning the 2012 CIK-FIA Karting World Cup in the KF3 class. Corberi received a 15-year ban from all FIA sanctioned motorsport events after he physically assaulted Paolo Ippolito at the 2020 FIA Karting World Championship.

== Racing career ==
Corberi began karting professionally in 2008. In 2012, he won the CIK-FIA Karting World Cup in the KF3 category, in the process beating future Formula One drivers George Russell and Lance Stroll. Corberi competed in various international karting championships, including the European and World Championships.

== 2020 World Championship incident and ban ==
On 4 October 2020, during the FIA Karting KZ World Championship final at the South Garda Karting circuit in Lonato, Italy (a track owned by his family) Corberi was involved in a collision with Paolo Ippolito, which forced Corberi to retire from the race.

After the crash Corberi refused to leave the trackside. He instead threw the detached front bumper of his kart at Ippolito's kart as it drove past. After the race was over, Corberi physically attacked Ippolito, initiating a fight that involved mechanics and Corberi's father.

The incident was condemned widely by many in the motorsport community. Felipe Massa, who was FIA Karting President at the time, stated, "This behaviour is unacceptable in our sport". Jenson Button demanded that Corberi receive a lifetime ban. On 5 October 2020, Corberi issued a public apology on Facebook and stated that he was going to retire from motorsport permanently.

In April 2021, the FIA issued Corberi a 15-year ban from all motorsport activities sanctioned by the FIA or national sporting authorities. The FIA had initially sought a lifetime ban, but the tribunal settled on 15 years. Corberi appealed the decision but the International Court of Appeal upheld the 15-year suspension in July 2021.

== See also ==
- Violence in sports
- Karting World Championship
