= Original Kart =

International kart racing class

OK
- Category: Kart racing
- Region: International
- Affiliations: CIK-FIA
- Inaugural season: 1981; 45 years ago (as Intercontinental A)
- Drivers' champion: (Belgium) Thibaut Ramaekers; (World, 2025); (Spain) Christian Costoya; (European, 2025)
- Teams' champion: (Italy) CRG-IAME; (World, 2024); (Italy) Kart Republic-IAME; (European, 2024)
- Official website: Official website

Original Kart (OK) is a kart racing class for drivers aged 14 and over, sanctioned by the CIK-FIA. OK is the primary direct-drive class in FIA championships.

The class was originally called Intercontinental A (ICA), introduced in 1981 at the European Championship as a secondary direct-drive class to Formula K. The class was first contested at the World Cup in 2006. In 2007—after 26 seasons of racing—ICA was replaced by KF2 and became the primary class in 2010, replacing KF1 at the World Championship. The KF2 class was renamed to KF upon the demise of KF1 in 2013, and was replaced by OK regulations in 2016.

OK is contested as the primary direct-drive class at the Karting World Championship and the Karting European Championship.

== History ==
=== Intercontinental A (1981–2006) ===
In 1981, Intercontinental A (ICA) was introduced alongside Formula K as a secondary direct-drive class for the European Championship.

Stefano Modena completed back-to-back ICA European Championships in 1984, a feat that would not be repeated until Andrea Kimi Antonelli under OK regulations in 2021.

The ICA World Cup was introduced in 2006, the final year of ICA regulations, won by French driver Mike Courquin.

=== KF2/KF (2007–2015) ===
In January 2007, the CIK-FIA decided to replace the 100 cc water-cooled two-stroke ICA engines with 125 cc Touch-and-Go (TaG) water-cooled two-stroke KF2 engines, producing 34–36 hp (25–27 kW). Now the secondary class to KF1—which had replaced Formula A—the KF2 class karts used hand-operated front brakes via a lever. The chassis had to be CIK-approved, with a minimum weight of 160 kg and 158 kg for national and international events, respectively. KF2 karts were equipped with an electric starter and a centrifugal clutch. The engine was limited to 15,000 rpm.

In 2010, karts of the KF2 category were mandated at the Karting World Championship as the primary direct-drive category, alongside the European Championship, replacing KF1 in both. KF1 returned to the World Championship in 2011 and 2012, reverting KF2 back to World Cup status, but met its demise at the end of the 2012 season. With the end of KF1 regulations, KF2 became known as simply KF and returned to the World Championship as the primary class once more.

=== Original Kart (2016–present) ===
In 2016, Original Kart (OK) regulations replaced KF in the direct-drive category, after its perceived failure within the kart racing community and restrictive regulations resulted in reduced entries at international competitions. OK karts had much of the electronics removed, and had to be push-started.

== Specification ==
=== Original Kart (OK) ===
There are eight main technical features of the OK regulations:

- 125 cc direct-coupled, water-cooled two-stroke, mixed-lubrication engine.
- Valve inlet in the piston skirt.
- Screw carburettor with a maximum diameter of 24 mm.
- Maximum speed (limiter) of 16,000 rpm.
- Power valve at the exhaust.
- Single rear brake with hydraulic control.
- Premium tyres, medium gum compound.
- Minimum weight 150 kg, driver included.

Engines, chassis, bodywork, brakes and tyres are subject to the homologation system put in place by the CIK-FIA. Each year, the tyres and the fuel for each category, as well as the KZ and KZ2 carburettor, are chosen after a call for tenders.

== Champions ==
OK has been contested at the European Championship since 1981 and the World Championship/World Cup since 2006, becoming the primary direct-drive class in 2010.

Italian driver Lorenzo Travisanutto is the only driver to win multiple OK World Championships. Notable OK World Champions include 2020–21 Formula E World Champion Nyck de Vries and 2025 Formula One champion driver Lando Norris.

Italian Formula One drivers Stefano Modena and Andrea Kimi Antonelli are the only drivers to win multiple OK European Championships. Notable OK European Champions include Formula One World Drivers' Champions Michael Schumacher and Max Verstappen.

=== By year ===
Key
Drivers
| * | Driver has competed in Formula One | | |
| † | Formula One World Drivers' Champion | | |
| ‡ | FIA World Champion in an auto racing discipline | | |
Tyres
| B | Bridgestone | L | LeCont |
| C | Carlisle | M | Maxxis |
| D | Dunlop | M | MG Tires |
| G | Goodyear | M | Mojo |
| K | Komet | V | Vega |

| Year | World Championship | | | | European Championship | | | | Year |
| Year | World Champion (Note: Italics indicates years contested as a World Cup, not an FIA World Championship: 2006–2009, 2011–2012.) | Chassis | Engine | Tyres | European Champion | Chassis | Engine | Tyres | Year |
|---|---|---|---|---|---|---|---|---|---|
| 1981 | ICA regulations created for the European Championship | | | | | | | | 1981 |
| 1981 | Not held | | | | (Netherlands) Peter De Bruijn | (Italy) Tecno | (Italy) Parilla | | 1981 |
| 1982 | Not held | | | | (Germany) Josef Bertzen | (United Kingdom) Zipkart | (Italy) Parilla | | 1982 |
| 1983 | Not held | | | | (Italy) Stefano Modena* | (Italy) DAP | (Italy) DAP | | 1983 |
| 1984 | Not held | | | | (Italy) Stefano Modena* (2) | (Italy) DAP | (Italy) DAP | | 1984 |
| 1985 | Not held | | | | (Finland) Jukka Virtanen | (Italy) Birel | (Italy) Parilla | | 1985 |
| 1986 | Not held | | | | (Sweden) Linus Lundberg | (Denmark) Dino | (Denmark) Dino | | 1986 |
| 1987 | Not held | | | | (Germany) Michael Schumacher† | (Italy) CRG | (Italy) Parilla | | 1987 |
| 1988 | Not held | | | | (Netherlands) Martijn Koene | (Italy) Tony Kart | (Austria) Rotax | | 1988 |
| 1989 | Not held | | | | (Netherlands) Jos Verstappen* | (Switzerland) Swiss Hutless | (Austria) Rotax | | 1989 |
| 1990 | Not held | | | | (France) Eddy Coubard | (Denmark) Dino | (Austria) Rotax | | 1990 |
| 1991 | Not held | | | | (Italy) Daniele Parrilla | (Italy) Birel | (Austria) Rotax | | 1991 |
| 1992 | Not held | | | | (Italy) Oliver Fiorucci | (Italy) Merlin | (Australia) Atomik | | 1992 |
| 1993 | Not held | | | | (France) Arnaud Sarrazin | (Italy) Tecno | (Austria) Rotax | | 1993 |
| 1994 | Not held | | | | (Belgium) Narcis Callens | (Italy) Biesse | (United States) Fox | | 1994 |
| 1995 | Not held | | | | (France) Arnaud Leconte | (Italy) Tecno | (Austria) Rotax | | 1995 |
| 1996 | Not held | | | | (France) Ludovic Veve | (Italy) Biesse | (Austria) Rotax | | 1996 |
| 1997 | Not held | | | | (Italy) Alessandro Balzan | (Italy) Top-Kart | (Italy) Comer | | 1997 |
| 1998 | Not held | | | | (France) Julien Poncelet | (Italy) CRG | (Italy) CRG | | 1998 |
| 1999 | Not held | | | | (Italy) Stefano Fabi | (Italy) Top-Kart | (Italy) Comer | B | 1999 |
| 2000 | Not held | | | | (France) Julien Menard | (Italy) Tony Kart | (Italy) Vortex | | 2000 |
| 2001 | Not held | | | | (France) Jean-Philippe Guignet | (Italy) Tony Kart | (Italy) Vortex | V | 2001 |
| 2002 | Not held | | | | (Belgium) Jonathan Thonon | (Italy) CRG | (Italy) Maxter | V | 2002 |
| 2003 | Not held | | | | (Italy) Nicola Bocchi | (Italy) CRG | (Italy) Maxter | V | 2003 |
| 2004 | Not held | | | | (France) Kévin Estre‡ | (France) Sodi | (Italy) TM | V | 2004 |
| 2005 | Not held | | | | (United Kingdom) James Calado‡ | (Italy) Tony Kart | (Italy) Vortex | B | 2005 |
| 2006 | ICA mandated at the World Cup | | | | | | | | 2006 |
| 2006 | (France) Mike Courquin | (France) Sodi | (Italy) TM | V | (Italy) Nicola Nolé | (Italy) CRG | (Italy) TM | V | 2006 |
| 2007 | ICA replaced by KF2 | | | | | | | | 2007 |
| 2007 | (United Kingdom) Michael Ryall | (Italy) Birel | (Italy) TM | D | (United Kingdom) Will Stevens* | (Italy) Tony Kart | (Italy) Vortex | D | 2007 |
| 2008 | (United Kingdom) Oliver Rowland | (Italy) Tony Kart | (Italy) Vortex | | (Italy) Flavio Camponeschi | (Italy) Tony Kart | (Italy) Vortex | | 2008 |
| 2009 | (Portugal) David da Luz | (Italy) Zanardi | (Italy) Parilla | | (United Kingdom) Jordan Chamberlain | (Italy) Tony Kart | (Italy) TM | | 2009 |
| 2010 | KF2 becomes the primary direct-drive class and upgraded to World Championship status | | | | | | | | 2010 |
| 2010 | (Netherlands) Nyck de Vries*‡ | (Italy) Zanardi | (Italy) Parilla | B | (Denmark) Nicolaj Møller Madsen | (Italy) Energy Corse | (Italy) TM | B | 2010 |
| 2011 | KF2 replaced by KF1 at the World Championship and downgraded to World Cup status (Note: KF2 remained the primary direct-drive class at the European Championship in 2011 and 2012.) | | | | | | | | 2011 |
| 2011 | (Italy) Loris Spinelli | (Italy) Tony Kart | (Italy) Vortex | V | (Belgium) Sami Luka | (Italy) Intrepid | (Italy) TM | B | 2011 |
| 2012 | (Italy) Felice Tiene | (Italy) CRG | (Italy) BMB | V | (United Kingdom) Ben Barnicoat | (France) ART | (Italy) Parilla | V | 2012 |
| 2013 | KF2 renamed to KF and upgraded to World Championship status | | | | | | | | 2013 |
| 2013 | (United Kingdom) Tom Joyner | (Italy) Zanardi | (Italy) TM | V | (Netherlands) Max Verstappen† | (Italy) CRG | (Italy) TM | V | 2013 |
| 2014 | (United Kingdom) Lando Norris† | (Italy) FA Kart | (Italy) Vortex | D | (United Kingdom) Callum Ilott | (Italy) Zanardi | (Italy) Parilla | B | 2014 |
| 2015 | (Poland) Karol Basz | (Italy) Kosmic | (Italy) Vortex | V | (United Kingdom) Ben Hanley | (Italy) Mad-Croc | (Italy) TM | V | 2015 |
| 2016 | KF replaced by OK | | | | | | | | 2016 |
| 2016 | (Spain) Pedro Hiltbrand | (Italy) CRG | (Italy) Parilla | V | (Spain) Pedro Hiltbrand | (Italy) CRG | (Italy) Parilla | V | 2016 |
| 2017 | (United Kingdom) Danny Keirle | (Italy) Zanardi | (Italy) Parilla | L | (Morocco) Sami Taoufik | (Italy) FA Kart | (Italy) Vortex | L | 2017 |
| 2018 | (Italy) Lorenzo Travisanutto | (Italy) Kart Republic | (Italy) Parilla | B | (Germany) Hannes Janker | (Italy) Kart Republic | (Italy) Parilla | B | 2018 |
| 2019 | (Italy) Lorenzo Travisanutto (2) | (Italy) Kart Republic | (Italy) Parilla | L | (Italy) Lorenzo Travisanutto | (Italy) Kart Republic | (Italy) Parilla | L | 2019 |
| 2020 | (United Kingdom) Callum Bradshaw | (Italy) Tony Kart | (Italy) Vortex | L | (Italy) Andrea Kimi Antonelli* | (Italy) Kart Republic | (Italy) Parilla | L | 2020 |
| 2021 | (Finland) Tuukka Taponen | (Italy) Tony Kart | (Italy) Vortex | M | (Italy) Andrea Kimi Antonelli* (2) | (Italy) Kart Republic | (Italy) IAME | M | 2021 |
| 2022 | (Brazil) Matheus Morgatto | (Italy) Kart Republic | (Italy) Parilla | M | (United Kingdom) Kean Nakamura-Berta | (Italy) Kart Republic | (Italy) IAME | M | 2022 |
| 2023 | Kirill Kutskov | (Italy) Kart Republic | (Italy) IAME | M | (Netherlands) René Lammers | (Italy) Parolin | (Italy) TM | M | 2023 |
| 2024 | (United Kingdom) Ethan Jeff-Hall | (Italy) CRG | (Italy) IAME | M | (United Kingdom) Joe Turney | (Italy) Kart Republic | (Italy) IAME | M | 2024 |
| Year | World Champion | Chassis | Engine | Tyres | European Champion | Chassis | Engine | Tyres | Year |
| Year | World Championship | | | | European Championship | | | | Year |

=== By driver ===
table

== See also ==
- KF1 – the primary direct-drive class from 2003 to 2012
- OK-Junior – the junior direct-drive class
- KZ – the primary gearbox class
- KZ2 – the secondary gearbox class
- Superkart – 250cc kart racing class
- CIK-FIA
- List of kart racing championships
