= OK-Junior =

Automobile racing series

OK-Junior is a kart racing class for top drivers between 12 years old (reaching their 12th birthday during the calendar year) and 14 years of age (reaching their 14th birthday during the calendar year).

This class used to be called Junior Intercontinental A (JICA or ICA-J) and has changed since January 2007 when CIK-FIA decided to replace the 100 cc air-cooled two-stroke engines with 125 cc Touch-and-Go (TaG) water-cooled two-stroke engines (KF type).The engines produce 26–27 hp (19–20 kW). The chassis and engines must be approved by the CIK-FIA. Minimum weight is 145 kg, including kart and driver.

Karts are equipped with an electric starter and clutch. The engine rpm is limited to 14,000 rpm.

It is one of the highest kart classes with national championships (perhaps with different tyre rules).

There is a European championship, a World Cup, as well as Oceania and Asia-Pacific championships. The Junior Monaco Kart Cup is taking place each year in this format.

For 2013 the class was renamed KF-Junior.

In 2016, the karts were completely re-designed by removing much of the electronics. The karts are now push started. The class was subsequently renamed OK-Junior, standing for Original Kart.

== Champions ==
=== World ===
Year	World Cup Winner	Chassis / Engine / Tires
2009	(Italy) Giuliano Niceta	Tony Kart / Vortex / Vega
2010	(Thailand) Alexander Albon	Intrepid / TM / Dunlop
2011	(Monaco) Charles Leclerc	Intrepid / TM / Vega
2012	(Italy) Luca Corberi	Kosmic / Vortex / Vega

Year	World Championship Winner	Chassis / Engine / Tires
2013	(Italy) Alessio Lorandi	Tony Kart / Parilla / LeCont
2014	(United Kingdom) Enaam Ahmed	FA Kart / Vortex / Vega
2015	(United States) Logan Sargeant	FA Kart / Vortex / LeCont
2016	(France) Victor Martins	Kosmic / Parilla / Vega
2017	(United Kingdom) Dexter Patterson	Exprit / TM / LeCont
2018	(France) Victor Bernier	Kosmic / Parilla / Vega
2019	(Netherlands) Thomas ten Brinke	FA Kart / Vortex / LeCont
2020	(United Kingdom) Freddie Slater	Kosmic / Vortex / LeCont
2021	(Japan) Kean Nakamura-Berta	Exprit / TM / MG
2022	(Thailand) Enzo Tarnvanichkul	Tony Kart / Vortex / Vega
2023	(Belgium) Dries Van Langendonck	Exprit / TM / Vega
2024	(United Kingdom) Kenzo Craigie	KR / IAME / Maxxis
2025	(United Kingdom) Noah Baglin	KR / IAME / Maxxis

=== Europe ===
Year	European Champion	Chassis / Engine / Tires
1999	(Austria) Reinhard Kofler	Tony Kart / Vortex
2000	(Germany) Michael Ammermüller	Tony Kart / Vortex
2001	(Germany) Sebastian Vettel	Tony Kart / Vortex / Vega
2002	(Switzerland) Sébastien Buemi	CRG / Maxter / Vega
2003	(Italy) Nicholas Risitano	Birel / TM / Vega
2004	(Monaco) Stefano Coletti	Birel / Parilla / Vega
2005	(Denmark) Michael Christensen	Gillard / Parilla / Bridgestone
2006	(Spain) Miquel Monrás	Maranello / Parilla / Vega
2007	(United Kingdom) Jack Harvey	Maranello / XTR / Dunlop
2008	(Finland) Aaro Vainio	Maranello / Maxter / Dunlop
2009	(Netherlands) Nyck de Vries	Zanardi / Parilla / Vega
2010	(Thailand) Alexander Albon	Intrepid / TM / Dunlop
2011	(United Kingdom) George Russell	Intrepid / TM / Vega
2012	(United Kingdom) George Russell	Tony Kart / Vortex / Vega
2013	(United Kingdom) Lando Norris	FA Kart / Vortex / LeCont
2014	(United Kingdom) Enaam Ahmed	FA Kart / Vortex / Vega
2015	(United Kingdom) Brenden Wyer	Tony Kart / Vortex/ LeCont
2016	(United Kingdom) Fin Kenneally	FA Kart / Vortex / Vega
2017	(United Kingdom) Jonny Edgar	Exprit / TM / LeCont
2018	(Estonia) Paul Aron	FA Kart / Vortex / Vega
2019	(Finland) Marcus Amand	Kosmic / Parilla / LeCont
2020	(United States) Ugo Ugochukwu	Kart Republic / Parilla / LeCont
2021	(United Kingdom) Freddie Slater	Kosmic / Vortex / MG
2022	(Russia) Anatoly Khavalkin	Parolin / TM / Vega
2023	(Ukraine) Oleksandr Bondarev	Kart Republic / IAME / Vega
2024	(Belgium) Dries van Langendonck	Exprit / TM / Maxxis
2025	(Netherlands) Dean Hoogendoorn	KR / IAME / Maxxis

== See also ==
- KF1, the top level of karting
- KF2, another KF1 feeder series besides KF3
- KZ1, the fastest KZ karting racing category
- KZ2, the second fastest KZ karting racing category
- Superkart, road racing with kart sized open-wheel cars
- Karting World Championship
- Karting European Championship
