= CRG (kart manufacturer) =

Italian kart chassis manufacturer

CRG is an Italian kart chassis manufacturer. Notable drivers who competed using their machinery include Max Verstappen and his mother Sophie Kumpen, as well as Alex Zanardi, Vitantonio Liuzzi and Lewis Hamilton.

Founded by three Italian racers (Carlo Vanaria, Roberto Vanaria and Giancarlo Tinini), CRG was originally known as Kalì Kart. In the beginning, the company was viewed as unfavorable, with Zanardi being told by his original team, DAP, that if he didn't stop complaining, they would "send him to Kalì". By the mid-1980s, Kalì had recovered from its inauspicious beginnings and was winning world championships with drivers including Mike Wilson.

Kalì changed its name to CRG in the 1986. They soon competed in more world championships with drivers including Danilo Rossi and Alessandro Manetti. CRG also goes under the name of Tinini Group, which was created in 2017, which is now visible on all sticker kits. CRG has also relations with Dino Chiesa (Chiesa Corse); the notable Italian chassis mechanic assisted multiple world champions as well as many other drivers through CRG.

CRG began building engines in the mid-1990s, but they were never widely used outside of the factory teams. In 2001, they were replaced by the Maxter brand which produces 100 cc and 125 cc gearbox engines. They also have been involved in the Maxter engine range. They were also the main supplier for brands including Maranello, Vanspeed, Zanardi, Dino, and DR Kart. In recent years, the team has partnered with TM racing.

In the past 30 years, CRG has been a successful brand and has been chosen by several current motorsport champions. For this reason, CRG Racing team is considered the “Champions Factory”. Drivers such as Michael Schumacher (for Kali), Max Verstappen, Alex Zanardi, Ralf Schumacher, Giancarlo Fisichella, and others have competed for the brand.

== World Championships & World Cups ==
Year	Category	Driver
2022	KZ2 (WORLD CUP)	(France) Arthur Carbonnel
2022	KZ1	(Sweden) Viktor Gustafsson
2017	KZ	(Italy) Paolo de Conto
2016	KZ	(Italy) Paolo de Conto
2016	KZ2 SUPER CUP	(Spain) Pedro Hiltbrand
2016	OK	(Spain) Pedro Hiltbrand
2015	KZ	(Netherlands) Jorrit Pex
2013	KZ	(Netherlands) Max Verstappen
2013	KF	(United Kingdom) Tom Joyner
2012	KF2 (WORLD CUP)	(Italy) Felice Tiene
2012	KZ2 (WORLD CUP)	(United Kingdom) Jordon Lennox-Lamb
2011	KF1	(Netherlands) Nyck de Vries
2011	KZ1 (WORLD CUP)	(Belgium) Jonathan Thonon
2011	U18	(United Kingdom) Matthew Graham
2010	KF2	(Netherlands) Nyck de Vries
2010	SKF (WORLD CUP)	(United Kingdom) Oliver Rowland
2009	SUPER KF	(France) Arnaud Kozlinski
2009	KF2 (WORLD CUP)	(Portugal) David da Luz
2009	KZ1	(Belgium) Jonathan Thonon
2008	KZ1	(Belgium) Jonathan Thonon
2007	KZ1	(Belgium) Jonathan Thonon
2003	FORMULA A	(New Zealand) Wade Cunningham
2002	FORMULA SUPER A	(Netherlands) Giedo van der Garde
2001	FORMULA SUPER A	(Italy) Vitantonio Liuzzi
2000	FORMULA A (WORLD CUP)	(United Kingdom) Lewis Hamilton
1999	FORMULA SUPER A	(Italy) Danilo Rossi
1999	FORMULA SUPER A (WORLD CUP)	(Italy) Vitantonio Liuzzi
1997	FA	(Italy) Danilo Rossi
1994	FORMULA SUPER A	(Italy) Alessandro Manetti
1994	FORMULA A (WORLD CUP)	(Italy) Luca Casazza
1994	5 CONTINENTS JUNIOR CUP	(Italy) Giorgio Pantano
1993	FORMULA A (WORLD CUP)	(Italy) Paolo Moro
1993	FORMULA C	(Italy) Alessandro Piccini
1993	5 CONTINENTS JUNIOR CUP	(Italy) Ennio Gandolfi
1992	FORMULA C	(Italy) Danilo Rossi
1992	FORMULA K	(Italy) Danilo Rossi
1992	FORMULA K (WORLD CUP)	(Italy) Danilo Rossi
1992	FORMULA A (WORLD CUP)	(Italy) Alberto Pedemonte
1990	FORMULA K	(Denmark) Jan Magnussen
1990	FORMULA A	(Italy) Danilo Rossi
1989	FORMULA K	(United Kingdom) Mike Wilson
1989	FORMULA C	(Italy) Gianluca Giorgi
1988	FORMULA SUPER 100	(France) Emmanuel Collard
1988	SKF	(United Kingdom) Mike Wilson
1985	FORMULA C	(Italy) Piermario Cantoni
1984	FORMULA K	(Denmark) Jörn Haase
1984	FORMULA C	(Italy) Gabriele Tarquini

European Championships

Year	Category	Driver
2018	KZ	(Netherlands) Jorrit Pex
2017	KZ	(Italy) Paolo de Conto
2016	KZ2	(Italy) Fabian Federer
2016	OK	(Spain) Pedro Hiltbrand
2014	KZ2	(Italy) Andrea Dalè
2014	KF	(United Kingdom) Callum Ilott
2014	KZ	(Belgium) Rick Dreezen
2013	KZ	(Netherlands) Max Verstappen
2013	KF	(Netherlands) Max Verstappen
2012	KZ1	(Netherlands) Jorrit Pex
2011	KZ2	(Italy) Fabian Federer
2009	KF3 NORTHERN QUALIF.	(Netherlands) Nyck de Vries
2009	KF3	(Netherlands) Nyck de Vries
2008	KZ1	(Belgium) Jonathan Thonon
2007	KF2 CENTRAL QUALIF.	(Italy) Felice Tiene
2006	100 ICA	(Italy) Nicola Nolé
2003	125 SUPER ICC	(Italy) Alessandro Manetti
2003	100 ICA	(Italy) Nicola Bocchi
2002	100 ICA	(Belgium) Jonathan Thonon
2002	100 ICA JUNIOR	(Switzerland) Sébastien Buemi
2001	125 FC	(Italy) Alessandro Piccini
2000	125 ICC	(Italy) Valerio Sapere
2000	FORMULA A	(United Kingdom) Lewis Hamilton
1998	100 ICA	(France) Julien Poncelet
1998	CADET’S GREEN TROPHY	(Portugal) Álvaro Parente
1998	FORMULA A	(Portugal) César Campaniço
1996	125 ICC	(Germany) Stefan Haak
1996	FORMULA C	(Italy) Alessandro Piccini
1996	FORMULA A	(Italy) Giorgio Pantano
1995	FA	(Italy) Giorgio Pantano
1994	CADET’S GREEN TROPHY	(Germany) Lucas Luhr
1993	CADET’S GREEN TROPHY	(Italy) Giorgio Pantano
1993	125 ICC	(Italy) Stefano Marcolin
1992	125 ICC	(Italy) Stefano Rodano
1992	FORMULA K	(Italy) Gianluca Beggio
1991	100 JUNIOR	(Spain) Jordi Surrales
1989	100 ICA JUNIOR	(Italy) Gianluca Malandrucco
1989	125 ICC	(Italy) Gianluca Paglicci
1988	125 ICC	(Italy) Vincenzo Saitta
1987	FORMULA K	(Italy) Alex Zanardi
1987	125 ICC	(Italy) Paolo Pulliero
1987	INTERCONTINENTAL-A	(Germany) Michael Schumacher
1986	FORMULA K	(France) Yvan Muller
1986	125 ICC	(Italy) Lamberto di Fernando
1985	INTERCONTINENTAL-B	(Germany) Stefan Frietsch
1984	125 ICC	(Italy) Riccardo Franchini
1979	125 ICC	(Sweden) Jan Svaneby
1979	FORMULA C	(Italy) Giancarlo Vanaria
