= Birel =

Kart and bicycle manufacturer

Birel S.p.A. of Lissone (near Milan, Italy) started building karts in the late 1950s after many years as a bicycle manufacturer.

== Legacy ==
They have had numerous world champions over the years including Mike Wilson and Gianluca Beggio.

The book, "Birel: 40 Years of Karting", was published in 2003.

Birel is the manufacturer of the "Easykart" 60 cc Cadet (8–12 years), 100 cc Junior (12–16 years), and 125 cc Light and Heavy class (16+ years). Championships in these classes are held in 26 countries worldwide, including Italy, United Kingdom, the United States, Japan, Russia and many other European and South American countries. Birel stages Easykart "World Finals" each October, and 2011 marked the tenth year of the competitions. In 2011, they also introduced a two-round European Series with a round in Italy followed by a round in Poland, to replace the European Finals which had been held in Poland for the previous three years.
