= 2007 Australian Superkart Championship =

Seasons
- ← 2006 2008 →

The 2007 Australian Superkart Championship was the 19th running of the national championships for Superkarts. It began on 6 May 2007 at Phillip Island Grand Prix Circuit and ended on 15 July at Eastern Creek Raceway after eight races.

It was contested for three engine-based classes, 250 cc International (twin-cylinder engines), 250 cc National (single-cylinder engines) and 125 cc. National championships were awarded to 250 cc International and 125, while 250 National were awarded a national title, but not an Australian Championship as there were insufficient competitors to qualify.

== Teams and drivers ==
The following drivers competed in the 2007 Australian Superkart Championship. The series consisted of two rounds, with four races at each meeting.

Team	Class	Chassis	Engine	No	Driver
RMR Superkarts	250 National	Anderson Maverick	KTM	1	(Australia) Jason McIntyre
RMR Superkarts	250 International	Anderson Maverick	FPE/RCS	6	(New Zealand) Wayne Sprostan
RMR Superkarts	250 International	Anderson Maverick	FPE/RCS	7	(Australia) Colin McIntyre
RMR Superkarts	250 International	Anderson Maverick	FPE/RCS	10	(Australia) Gary Pegoraro
RMR Superkarts	250 International	Anderson Maverick	FPE/RCS	11	(Australia) Evan Fuller
RMR Superkarts	250 National	Anderson Maverick	Kawasaki	21	(Australia) Rick Setterfield
Bittern Garden Supplies	250 National	Anderson Mirage	PVP	3	(Australia) Shannon Barton
Rocket Race Engines	250 International	Anderson Mirage	FPE/RCS	4	(Australia) Rod Prickett
Zip – BDH	250 International	Zip Eagle II	BRC	5	(Australia) Gerard Seibert
Zip – BDH	250 International	Zip Eagle II	BRC	15	(Australia) Peter Knispel
Zip – BDH	250 International	Zip Eagle II	BRC	27	(Australia) Barbara Hepworth
Zip – BDH	250 International	Zip Eagle II	BRC	29	(Australia) Yiani Harpas
Zip – BDH	250 International	Zip Eagle II	BRC	66	(Australia) Todd Johnson
International Entertainment	250 International	PVP	PVP	8	(New Zealand) Anton Stevens
Stockman Superkarts	250 International	Stockman MR2	Honda RS250	9	(Australia) Sam Zavaglia
Stockman Superkarts	250 National	Stockman MR2	Kawasaki	12	(Australia) John Roberts
Stockman Superkarts	250 International	Stockman MR2	Honda RS250	18	(Australia) Warren McIlveen
Stockman Superkarts	125 Gearbox	Stockman MR2	Honda RS125	24	(Australia) Chris Harward
Maddern Oil Pty Ltd	250 International	Zip Eagle II		14	(Australia) Chas Maddern
MJR Bricklaying	250 National	Stockman MR2	Yamaha	16	(Australia) Martin Latta
Rod Conn	125 Gearbox	Arrow	Honda RS125	17	(Australia) Rod Conn
Safe Billet Cases	250 International	Anderson Mirage	SAFE/RCS	19	(Australia) Darren Hossack
Darren Dunn	125 Gearbox	Topkart	Honda RS125	20	(Australia) Darren Dunn
Project Precast	250 National	Stockman MR2	Yamaha	22	(Australia) David Williams
Lombo Concreting	250 International	Anderson Maverick	Honda RS250	25	(Australia) Andrew Lombardo
Lombo Concreting	250 International	Anderson Maverick	Honda RS250	26	(Australia) Eddie Lombardo
Lombo Concreting	250 National	Zapelli	Kawasaki	76	(Australia) Chris Sullings
Ron Ping	125 Gearbox	Stockman MR2	Honda RS125	28	(Australia) Ron Ping
Buildersmile Construction	250 International	PVP	PVP	30	(Australia) Carlo Chermaz
Suburban Accounting	125 Gearbox	Stockman MR2	Honda RS125	33	(Australia) Kristian Stebbing
Suburban Accounting	250 International	Stockman MR2	Honda RS250	77	(Australia) Brad Stebbing
Coach Design	125 Gearbox	Stockman MR2 Laydown	Honda RS125	35	(Australia) Russell Jamieson
Coach Design	125 Gearbox	Stockman MR2 Laydown	Honda RS125	86	(Australia) Chryss Jamieson
NEC Automotive	250 International	Stockman MR2	Honda RS250	40	(Australia) Stephen Castles
Impact Flags & Banners	125 Gearbox	Stockman MR2	Honda RS125	46	(Australia) Colin Moore
James Bakker	125 Gearbox	Bakker	Honda RS125	51	(Australia) James Bakker
IDM Racing	125 Gearbox	Centreline	Honda RS125	55	(Australia) Ian Mash
GR Industries	250 National	Stockman MR2		60	(Australia) Frank Giglio
Giova Design	250 International	Avoig	Honda RS250	62	(Australia) John Pellicano
Giova Design	125 Gearbox	Avoig	Honda RS125	63	(Australia) Luke Brown
JBL Performance	125 Gearbox	Bakker	Honda RS125	65	(Australia) Jarrod Lethborg
	125 Gearbox	Stockman MR2	Honda RS125	70	(Australia) Anthony Lappas
City Mobile Brakes	250 International	Bakker	Honda RS250	72	(Australia) Dean McGinty
Guards Australia	125 Gearbox	Centreline	Honda RS125	74	(Australia) Allan Dodge
Kitten Car Care Products	250 International	Anderson Maverick		88	(Australia) Greg Ruff
Nick Paul	250 International	Stockman MR2	Honda RS250	89	(Australia) Robert Oakley
Modbury Press	125 Gearbox	MDV	Honda RS125	91	(Australia) David Prest
Mark Hanson	250 International	Zip Eagle II	Yamaha TZ250	96	(Australia) Mark Hanson
KC Tools	250 International	Anderson Maverick	Honda RS250	99	(Australia) Daniel Rammerman

== Season review ==
=== Round 1 ===
Sydney based racer Sam Zavaglia stepped back from the brink of a kart destroying crash to win the fourth and final race of the weekend, claiming the opening round of the Australian Superkart Championship held at the Shannons Nationals Motor Racing Championships at Phillip Island.

Zavaglia (Stockman Superkarts Stockman-Honda) started the day well with a pair of second places in the two opening races behind teammate and defending champion Warren McIlveen (Mac's Marine Stockman-Honda). Race Three saw disaster strike when Zavaglia slid off the track at the Southern Loop while leading, plunging off a half metre drop in the infield as he struggled to rejoin the circuit, wrecking his nosecone on his way to salvaging sixth place. The final bonus points race saw Zavaglia climb rapidly into second place where he fought for the place with New Zealander Anton Stevens (International Entertainment PVP-PVP) which became a battle for the lead when McIlveen slowed with tyre failure. Zavaglia cleared away from Stevens for the win.

The tyre failure cost McIlveen the round win who had overcome ignition and clutch problems to claim the three preliminary race wins. Limping home for a 34th placed finish in the final gave the Tamworth-based racer points enough to secure third place for the round, but McIlveen did have the satisfaction of taking home the Phillip Island lap record (1:32.6516), an eight-year-old record held previously by Stockman Superkarts Team Manager, Brian Stockman.

Discovery of the meeting was the Marron Excavations / RMR Superkarts Anderson-FPE/RCS of Gary Pegoraro. Only a month after the Melbourne Superkarter stepped into the 250cc International ranks Pegoraro sits second in the Australian Championship after scoring a second and two thirds in the preliminary races. The former 250cc National racer faded to fourth in the final behind the improving pace of Stevens and Carlo Chermaz (Buildersmile Constructions PVP-PVP) but he now sits just four points behind Zavaglia heading into the next round at Eastern Creek.

Chermaz third-place finish in the final capped off a round above his expectations after a curtailed preparation from a construction site accident forcing the Queenslander to race recovering from a broken elbow and hand. Just four points behind McIlveen and twelve behind Zavaglia there is a four driver showdown beckoning at Eastern Creek in July for the championship decider.

In the 250cc National division, reigning champion Jason McIntyre (Marron Excavations / RMR Superkarts Anderson-KTM) had a perfect weekend, turning pole position into four races wins including a top ten finish in Race Three. McIntyre was however pushed as he has never been pushed in the last two seasons as John Roberts (Stockman Superkarts Stockman-Kawasaki) diced with McIntyre in three of the four races and heads to Eastern Creek closer in the points race than any of McIntyre rivals have managed. Another class newcomer, David Williams (Project Precast Anderson-Yamaha) snapped at the heels of McIntyre and Roberts throughout the weekend to finish third.

A tyre failure in race one saw defending 125cc reigning champion Russell Jamieson (Coach Design Stockman-Honda) finish the weekend in third place as his teammate and father Chryss Jamieson (Coach Design Stockman-Honda) took out the round. The distinctive laydown designed Stockman chassis taking two race victories each with Russell eclipsing Steve Crossland's six-year-old lap record in a dominant Race Four performance. Three thirds and a second in the bonus points Race Four has put Kristian Stebbing (Suburban Accounting Stockman-Honda) between the Jamieson family in the points, while veteran racer Colin Moore (Impact Flags & Banners Stockman-Honda) sits just one point behind Russell Jamieson after a consistent run.

Driver Quotes: Sam Zavaglia (Stockman Superkarts Stockman-Honda) 250cc International First, "I don't know where it come from, but I got a top end misfire under load. It was well down on horsepower. When Anton passed me I used his tow to drag me along behind him. I've been here before and lost with three laps to go, you don't know where it's going to end, but I'm glad it finished that way. I've had some luck. It's been a good weekend and I couldn't have hoped for better. We had problems but we still got there."

Gary Pegoraro (Marron Excavations Anderson-FPE/RCS) 250cc International Second, "I've had a pretty reasonable weekend consider we've only had the kart for a month. I can't complain. We've had a couple of issues but when you're trying to catch some of the best karters in the world you have to do your homework. We've got a little bit more to do. But our RMR Anderson is going really well."

Warren McIlveen (Mac's Marine Stockman-Honda) 250cc International Third, "I had a tyre blowout coming in to the second last lap and managed to scramble home for a point in the final. The kart went mostly fine but we had ignition problems in the fourth and the third race and a clutch slipping problem. Roll on Eastern Creek and hopefully I can win all four races there and maybe win the championship."

Jason McIntyre (Marron Excavations Anderson-KTM) 250cc National First, "The kart was brilliant. The Whizzer engine was brilliant all day. We had some competition for a change where we were pushed all the way but we were able to pull away. To come away from Round 1 with four wins, it's looking good for Eastern Creek."

Chryss Jamieson (Coach Design Stockman-Honda) 125cc First, "The weekend started ordinary but it finished good. We had a very very good day. We were lucky the engine failure happened on Friday but the important days, Saturday and Sunday was really good. Those two young fellas had the wood on me in that last race and congratulations to Russell for breaking the lap record."

=== Round 2 ===
Warren McIlveen was too quick for the competition at Eastern Creek Raceway, taking two wins and a second to secure his sixth Australian Superkart Championship, a tenth consecutive title for the Stockman Superkarts team. Jason McIntyre successfully defended his 250 National division title, while Kristian Stebbing broke through for his first title, winning the 125cc Australian Championship.

McIlveen (Mac's Marine Stockman-Honda) was behind in the points heading into the final round, some eight points behind Stockman Superkarts teammate Sam Zavaglia, and four behind RMR Superkarts racer Gary Pegoraro, but pole position and a dominant Race 1 win put his title firmly back on track. Winning the second race with Zavaglia well down the order with an electrical gremlin meant the pressure was off for the final as all he would need as a finish inside the top eight. What gave the pursuing three drivers hope was continuing cylinder detonation issues with the kart that might bring McIlveen undone. The kart and driver were strong enough to control the race from the front early on in the final race. Zavaglia slipped through to take the final race victory, bringing home a 1–2 finish in the championship for the Stockman Superkarts team.

Proceedings had been complicated by an incident during the third race when a wheel rubbing clash between Zavaglia and the International Entertainment PVP of Anton Stevens sent Stevens into a tumbling accident. While there were initial fears for Stevens health, his injuries were relatively minor and it is expected that the New Zealander will be released from hospital on Monday. Stevens had been very quick and had recovered to be fighting in the top three after a bolt head break in Race 1 had caused a chain reaction that sprayed engine water over the Kiwi in Race 1. An excellent second place behind McIlveen in Race 2 demonstrated what he had been capable of.

The ensuing delay while the paramedics attended Stevens and a brief investigation by the authorities the program was substantially delayed leading to the race being declared at two laps, effectively a non-result with no points awarded.

This left Zavaglia, Carlo Chermaz and Pegoraro separated by just four points heading into the final. However, third and fourth was the best Chermaz and Pegoraro could manage. For Chermaz though second for the round and third for the championship was an excellent result after being forced to race the previous round with a broken elbow and injured arm. Chermaz's tiny team from Queensland performed above expectations against the big multicar teams from Stockman's and RMR.

For Pegoraro, fourth in the championship is perhaps disappointing but it was his first season in 250 International for several years as the RMR Marron Excavations Anderson-Rotax team built up this year to challenge Stockman Superkarts. It took until the second race for Pegoraro to get up to the pace but was just off the pace of top three karts.

Darren Hossack had a consistent run through the weekend, running just on the tail of the pace of Chermaz, Pegoraro and Stevens, picking up points to finish fifth in the championship for the Safe Evolutions team, proving the local ingenuity of the teams self-developed Safe Billet Cases engines. Stephen Castles in the NEC Automotive Stockman improved over the weekend to finish sixth.

In 250 Nationals class, defending Jason McIntyre's title became easier after a reed valve failed on John Roberts' Stockman-Kawasaki. A second DNF in Race 2 wrapped the title up but McIntyre won the third race to make sure, leaving him undefeated for the season. Consistency brought his RMR teammate Rick Setterfield into second position for the championship while a final race finish allowed Roberts to hang on to third in the points.

125cc championship went right down to the wire with just two points separating the Coach Design Stockman-Honda of Chryss Jamieson and the Suburban Accounting Stockman-Honda of Kristian Stebbing. Stebbing had won the two early races to get into position to threaten Jamieson but in the end was gifted the championship when Jamieson retired on the second lap of the final race. Stebbing backed off at that point and the IGA Romeo's Foodland Stockman-Honda of Anthony Lappas won the race, but second was enough for Stebbing to secure the title. A pair of accidents would drop defending champion and lap record holder Russell Jamieson (Coach Design Stockman-Honda) out of contention leaving veteran Colin Moore (Impact Flags and Banners Stockman-Honda) to take third in the championship after a consistent run through the weekend.

Driver Quotes: 1st 250 International Warren McIlveen (Mac's Marine Stockman MR2 Honda): "I'm wrapped, it's just awesome. I got out in front in that last race. I saw Sam behind me, so I let him go, my tyres were pretty well shot anyway. I just kept it on the track to finish the race and win another title. We had some detonation problems, and a few other dramas, the team has been great. This is the tenth year in a row for Stockman Superkarts."

2nd 250 International Sam Zavaglia (Stockman Superkarts Stockman MR2 Honda): "I was chasing Warren down, his tyres were skating. We already had it planned that I wasn't going to pass him but he couldn't handle me being behind him! We work as a team at Stockman Superkarts. I've had a rough, rough weekend so I'm happy I got that finish, but Warren has been the driver of the series by far."

3rd 250 International Carlo Chermaz (Buildersmile Construction PVP): "I think that's about as fast as I could have gone around here. After the first round where I was physically not very well this is the best outcome I could have gotten. Unfortunately in that last race I should have been a bit braver going into turn two on that opening lap, I got swamped under brakes by a few of the guys and I got held up for a few laps and had to pick them off. I couldn't ask for a better weekend."

1st 250 National Jason McIntyre (Marron Excavation Anderson Maverick KTM): "The weekend started not so good, the kart balance wasn't exactly there Over the weekend we got back onto the pace. Eight wins from eight starts for the series, I'm extremely happy with that. In the final in the colder conditions the kart was a lot better and my times were just two tenths over my current lap record. Another title to make three in a row I'm very happy with."

1st 125 Gearbox Kristian Stebbing (Suburban Accounting Stockman Honda): "I'm wrapped. My first Australian title. I worked very hard for it. We spent a lot of time between meetings improving the kart and it all paid off today. It all came down to the last race, I was two points behind Chryss Jamieson, unfortunately for him he seized around turn two. When I saw that I eased off and just tried to get it home."

== Results and standings ==
=== Race calendar ===
The 2007 Australian Superkart Championship season consisted of two rounds. Four races were held at both race meetings.

Rd.	Race title	Circuit	City / state	Date	Winner 250Int	Team	Winner 250Nat	Team	Winner 125	Team	Report
1	(Australia) Phillip Island	Phillip Island Grand Prix Circuit	Phillip Island, Victoria	5–6 May	Sam Zavaglia	Stockman Superkarts	Jason McIntyre	RMR Superkarts	Chryss Jamieson	Coach Design	
2	(Australia) Eastern Creek	Eastern Creek Raceway	Sydney, New South Wales	14–15 July	Warren McIlveen	Stockman Superkarts	Jason McIntyre	RMR Superkarts	Kristian Stebbing	Suburban Accounting	

=== Drivers Championship ===
Points were awarded 20–17–15–13–11–10–9–8–7–6–5–4–3–2–1 based on the top fifteen race positions in first three races of each round. The fourth race of each round, which is longer than the others (eight laps vs five laps) awarded points for the top twenty race positions at 25–22–20–18–16–15-14-13-12-11-10-9-8-7-6-5-4-3-2-1. Race three at Eastern Creek had no points allocated after a red flag declared the race after just two laps.

Pos	Driver	PHI 1	PHI 2	PHI 3	PHI 4	EAS 1	EAS 2	EAS 3	EAS 4	Pts
250 INTERNATIONAL
1	Warren McIlveen	1st	1st	1st	34th	1st	1st		2nd	123
2	Sam Zavaglia	2nd	2nd	6th	1st	2nd	19th		1st	114
3	Carlo Chermaz	4th	5th	4th	3rd	3rd	3rd		3rd	107
4	Gary Pegoraro	3rd	3rd	2nd	4th	6th	6th		4th	103
5	Darren Hossack	Ret	10th	8th	5th	4th	4th		5th	72
6	Stephen Castles	5th	6th	Ret	Ret	5th	5th		6th	58
7	Anton Stevens	Ret	4th	Ret	2nd	Ret	2nd		DNS	52
8	Colin McIntyre	7th	Ret	DNS	DNS	7th	7th		7th	41
9	Wayne Sprostan	9th	7th	7th	6th	Ret	DNS		DNS	56
10	Robert Oakley	6th	Ret	3rd	8th					38
11	Daniel Ramerman	16th	25th	15th	33rd	8th	12th		8th	36
12	Yiani Harpas	Ret	8th	5th	7th					33
13	Brad Stebbing	10th	17th	Ret	9th	Ret	9th		13th	27
14	John Pellicano	8th	Ret	Ret	DNS	21st	8th		Ret	22
14	Andrew Lombardo	19th	Ret	DNS	15th	9th	10th		Ret	22
16	George Koutros					22nd	17th		19th	20
17	Greg Ruff	12th	9th	11th	Ret					18
17	Mark Hanson	15th	11th	Ret	10th					18
17	Dean McGinty	Ret	12th	19th	11th					18
20	Eddie Lombardo	Ret	Ret	DNS	Ret	25th	24th		23rd	16
21	Brett Purdie	11th	22nd	Ret	12th					15
22	Rod Prickett	Ret	DNS	DNS	DNS	Ret	DNS		9th	12
22	Evan Fuller	18th	13th	32nd	17th					12
24	Peter Knispel	27th	27th	18th	26th					10
24	Todd Johnson	26th	26th	20th	20th					10
26	Gerard Siebert	Ret	37th	Ret	16th					8
27	Barbara Hepworth	13th	Ret	DNS	24th					7
250 NATIONAL
1	Jason McIntyre	14th	14th	9th	13th	10th	11th		10th	150
2	Rick Setterfield	25th	19th	16th	25th	17th	14th		16th	97
3	John Roberts	17th	16th	10th	14th	DNS	Ret		11th	93
4	Shannon Barton	20th	18th	29th	22nd	11th	DNS		12th	93
5	Frank Giglio	31st	33rd	31st	32nd	23rd	20th		Ret	67
6	David Williams	21st	15th	12th	18th					65
7	Martin Latta	29th	31st	Ret	DNS	13th	Ret		15th	53
8	Chris Sullings	34th	Ret	DNS	DNS	18th	Ret		17th	34
9	Lee Filliponi	Ret	36th	28th	36th					33
125 GEARBOX
1	Kristian Stebbing	24th	23rd	17th	21st	12th	13th		18th	129
2	Chryss Jamieson	22nd	21st	13th	23rd	14th	16th		Ret	109
3	Colin Moore	23rd	24th	21st	27th	24th	21st		22nd	97
4	Chris Harward	28th	28th	22nd	29th	20th	18th		DNS	73
5	Russell Jamieson	Ret	20th	14th	19th	Ret	22nd		DNS	72
6	Rod Conn	32nd	30th	26th	30th	Ret	DNS		21st	58
7	David Prest	33rd	35th	27th	31st	Ret	26th		25th	55
8	Jarrod Lethborg					16th	15th		20th	50
9	Ron Ping	30th	32nd	23rd	35th					41
9	Allan Dodge	35th	38th	Ret	DNS	27th	27th		24th	41
11	Anthony Lappas					15th	Ret		14th	40
12	Darren Dunn	Ret	29th	25th	28th					34
13	James Bakker	36th	Ret	24th	Ret	26th	23rd		Ret	33
14	Luke Brown	Ret	34th	30th	Ret	19th	25th		Ret	31
15	Ian Mash					28th	28th		26th	24
Pos	Driver	PHI 1	PHI 2	PHI 3	PHI 4	EAS 1	EAS 2	EAS 3	EAS 4	Pts

Colour	Result
Gold	Winner
Silver	Second place
Bronze	Third place
Green	Points classification
Blue	Non-points classification
Blue	Non-classified finish (NC)
Purple	Retired, not classified (Ret)
Red	Did not qualify (DNQ)
Red	Did not pre-qualify (DNPQ)
Black	Disqualified (DSQ)
White	Did not start (DNS)
White	Withdrew (WD)
White	Race cancelled (C)
Blank	Did not practice (DNP)
Blank	Did not arrive (DNA)
Blank	Excluded (EX)
