= 2008 Australian Superkart Championship =

Seasons
- ← 2007 2009 →

The 2008 Australian Superkart Championship covers national level Superkart racing in Australia during 2008.

== Featured events ==
=== Australian Superkart Championship ===
The 2008 Australian Superkart Championship will be the 20th running of the national championships for Superkarts. It will begin on 13 July 2008 at Eastern Creek Raceway (using what is currently known as the Gardner Grand Prix Circuit) and end on 2 November at Mallala Motor Sport Park after eight races.

It will be contested for three engine based classes, 250 cc International (twin cylinder engines), 250 cc National (single-cylinder engines) and 125 cc.

=== Non-Gearbox Superkart Championship ===
The Australian championship for non-gearbox Superkarts will be held at Phillip Island Grand Prix Circuit on 10 August and will be consisted of the Rotax Max family of classes; two weight based classes Light and Heavy and Junior Max for competitors under the age of 17.

=== V8 Supercar ===
Superkarts will compete as a support category for V8 Supercars for the first time at the series second round, to be held at Eastern Creek on 9 March.

== Teams and drivers ==
=== Gearbox ===
The following drivers competed in the 2008 Australian Superkart Championship. The series consisted of two rounds, with four races at each meeting.

Team	Class	Chassis	Engine	No	Driver
RMR Superkarts	250 National	Anderson Maverick	KTM	2	(Victoria (state)) Rick Setterfield
RMR Superkarts	250 International	Anderson Maverick	FPE/RCS	7	(Victoria (state)) Jason McIntyre (Victoria (state)) Matthew Wall
RMR Superkarts	250 International	Anderson Maverick	FPE/RCS	10	(Victoria (state)) Gary Pegoraro
RMR Superkarts	250 International	Anderson Maverick	FPE/RCS	26	(New Zealand) Wayne Sprostan (New Zealand) Karl Wilson
Buildersmile Construction	250 International	PVP	PVP	3	(Queensland) Carlo Chermaz
Rocket Race Engines	250 International	Anderson Mirage	FPE/RCS	4	(Victoria (state)) Rod Prickett
Rocket Race Engines	250 International	Anderson Mirage	FPE/RCS	57	(Victoria (state)) Darren Tyler
Rocket Race Engines	125 Gearbox	Omega	TM	95	(Victoria (state)) Steve Young
Zip - BDH	250 International	Zip Eagle II	BRC	5	(South Australia) Gerard Siebert
Zip - BDH	250 International	Zip Eagle II	BRC	27	(Victoria (state)) Luke May
Zip - BDH	250 International	Zip Eagle II	BRC	66	(South Australia) Todd Johnson
OnGuard Safety Training	125 Gearbox	Stockman MR2	Honda RS125	6	(Queensland) Bruce Lewis
OnGuard Safety Training	125 Gearbox	Centreline	Honda RS125	67	(Queensland) Craig Heufel
MJR Bricklaying	250 National	Stockman MR2	Yamaha YZ250	6	(Victoria (state)) Martin Latta
Electrosil; Art Motorsport; Kelgate	250 International	PVP	PVP	8	(New Zealand) Anton Stevens
Stockman Superkarts	250 International	Stockman MR2	Honda RS250	9	(Victoria (state)) Stephen Castles
Stockman Superkarts	250 International	Stockman MR2	Honda RS250	17	(New South Wales) Gerald Chait
Stockman Superkarts	250 International	Stockman MR2	Honda RS250	18	(New South Wales) Warren McIlveen
Stockman Superkarts	250 International	Stockman MR2	Yamaha TZ250	19	(New South Wales) Sam Zavaglia
Stockman Superkarts	250 International	Stockman MR2	Honda RS250	43	(New South Wales) John Roberts
One Zero Racing	250 International	Anderson Mirage	Rotax 256	11; 12	(Queensland) Brock Nicholas
BCR	250 International	Anderson		12	(Australia) Dean Davies
Suburban Accounting	250 International	Anderson Maverick		13	(Germany) Ralf Rupprecht
Suburban Accounting	250 International	Stockman MR2	Honda RS250	33	(Victoria (state)) Kristian Stebbing
Suburban Accounting	125 Gearbox	Stockman MR2	Honda RS125	77	(Victoria (state)) Brad Stebbing
B Antrobus	125 Gearbox	Gladiator	Yamaha 80	14	(Queensland) Bodine Antrobus
G Milenkovic	125 Gearbox	Stockman MR2	Honda RS125	15	(New South Wales) Goran Milenkovic
Safe Evolutions	250 International	Anderson Mirage	SAFE	16; 19	(Victoria (state)) Darren Hossack
IGA Supermarkets	125 Gearbox	Stockman MR2	Honda RS125	17; 70	(South Australia) Anthony Lappas
Darren Dunn	125 Gearbox	Topkart	Honda RS125	20	(Victoria (state)) Darren Dunn
C Systems Dyno; George Floth Engineering	125 Gearbox	Stockman MR2	Honda RS125	22	(Queensland) Craig Philp
C Systems Dyno; George Floth Engineering	125 Gearbox	Stockman MR2	Honda RS125	23	(Queensland) Tim Philp
Lombo Racing	250 International	Anderson Maverick	Honda RS250	25	(New South Wales) Adrian Lombardo
Lombo Racing	250 International	Centreline	Honda RS250	27	(New South Wales) Rami Viitanen
Internode; Metaplanners; Davtec	250 International	Zip Eagle II	BRC	28	(South Australia) Ilya Harpas
Internode; Metaplanners; Davtec	250 International	Zip Eagle II	BRC	29	(South Australia) Yiani Harpas
Team CRD	125 Gearbox	Worrall	Honda RS125	30	(New South Wales) Clinton Downs
Nick Paul	250 International	Stockman MR2	Honda RS250	32	(South Australia) Robert Oakley
John Roberts	125 Gearbox	Stockman MR2	Honda RS125	34	(New South Wales) John Reed
Coach Design	125 Gearbox	Stockman MR2 Laydown	Honda RS125	35	(Queensland) Russell Jamieson
Coach Design	250 International	Anderson Maverick	Honda RS250	86	(Queensland) Chryss Jamieson
	250 International	PVP	Rotax	39	(Victoria (state)) Jason Maros
NEC Automotive	250 International	Stockman MR2	Honda RS250	40	(Victoria (state)) Greg Bass
Jeff Burford	250 International	Zip Eagle II		41	(South Australia) Jeff Burford
Sodi-Maxjet Racing	125 Gearbox	Sodi	Rotax Max	42	(Queensland) John Hay
Paul Snaith	250 International	Eliminator		44	(New South Wales) Paul Snaith
Impact Flags & Banners	125 Gearbox	Stockman MR2	Honda RS125	46	(Victoria (state)) Colin Moore
Squeeler Racing	250 International	Zip		48	(New South Wales) Jeffrey Squires
Squeeler Racing	250 International	Stockman MR2		49	(New South Wales) Don Wheeler
John Bakker	125 Gearbox	Bakker	Honda RS125	50; 51	(Victoria (state)) John Bakker
Martelco Equipment Hire	250 International	Zip Eagle II	Yamaha TZ250	50; 52	(South Australia) Brett Purdie
MW Racing	250 International	Anderson		51	(New South Wales) Mike Wayne
IDM Racing; ANC Health	125 Gearbox	Centreline	Honda RS125	55	(New South Wales) Ian Mash
Crispy Racing	250 National	Anderson Mirage		58	(Victoria (state)) David Yuill
GR Industries	250 National	Stockman MR2		60	(New South Wales) Frank Giglio
Gas Action Services	250 International	PVP	Honda RS250	61	(New Zealand) Steve Murray
Avoig Racing	125 Gearbox	Avoig	Honda RS125	61	(New South Wales) Sonny Luca
Avoig Racing	125 Gearbox	Avoig	Honda RS125	62	(New South Wales) John Pellicano
Avoig Racing	250 International	Avoig	Honda RS250	62	(New South Wales) John Pellicano
Avoig Racing	250 International	Avoig	Honda RS250	81	(New South Wales) Luke Brown
Advantage Fastener Specialists	250 International	Stockman MR2	Honda RS250	65	(New South Wales) Terry Lancaster
www.trimfix.com.nz	125 Gearbox	Bakker	Honda RS125	65	(Victoria (state)) Jarrod Lethborg
Kylope Hire Cars	125 Gearbox	Stockman MR2	Honda RS125	69	(New South Wales) Mehmet Sinani
Team Kout	250 International	Avoig	Honda RS250	72	(New South Wales) George Koutros
Guards Australia	125 Gearbox	Centreline	Honda RS125	74	(New South Wales) Alan Dodge
R Ping	125 Gearbox	Stockman MR2	Honda RS125	78	(New South Wales) Ron Ping
Taplin Racing	125 Gearbox	Arrow	Rotax Max	82	(Australia) Graeme Taplin
Kitten Car Care Products	250 International	Anderson Maverick	Yamaha TZ250	88	(South Australia) Gerrit Ruff
Nick Paul	250 International	Stockman MR2	Honda RS250	89	(South Australia) Robert Oakley
Oakley; Virtual Magazine	250 International	Zip Eagle II	Rotax 256	94	(Victoria (state)) Michael Treloar
Phoenix Dental Laboratory	250 International	Zip Eagle II	Yamaha TZ250	96	(Western Australia) Mark Hanson
Lagler Racing	125 Gearbox	HyperRacer	Rotax Max	98	(Australia) Patrick Atherton
Fuji Xerox	125 Gearbox	Cougar Evo-1	Honda RS125	98	(Queensland) Jason Smith
KC Tools	250 International	Anderson Maverick	Yamaha TZ250	99	(South Australia) Daniel Rammerman
Endless Belt Racing	125 Gearbox	Arrow	Rotax Max	111	(Australia) Wayne Horswell

=== Non-gearbox ===
The following drivers competed in the 2008 non-gearbox Australian Superkart Championship. The series consisted of a single round, with four races.

Team	Class	Chassis	Engine	No	Driver
Safe Fire Electrical	Rotax Heavy	Viper	Rotax Max	1	(South Australia) Ron Goldfinch
Jones Kart Developments; Viper Superkarts	Rotax Light	Viper	Rotax Max	2	(South Australia) Shaun Jones
Jones Kart Developments; Viper Superkarts	Rotax Light	Viper	Rotax Max	47	(South Australia) Tim Scarman
BF Racing; Marron Excavations	Rotax Heavy	Monaco	Rotax Max	3	(Victoria (state)) Colin McIntyre
BF Racing; Marron Excavations	Rotax Light	Arrow	Rotax Max	7	(Victoria (state)) Jason McIntyre
BF Racing; Marron Excavations	Rotax Heavy	Monaco	Rotax Max	10	(Victoria (state)) Gerad McLeod
BF Racing; Marron Excavations	Rotax Heavy	Monaco	Rotax Max	24	(Victoria (state)) Lee Filliponi
BF Racing; Marron Excavations	Rotax Heavy	Arrow	Rotax Max	48	(Victoria (state)) Matthew Palmer
Ian Williams Tuning	Rotax Heavy	Arrow	Rotax Max	9	(South Australia) Greg Stillwell
Ian Williams Tuning	Rotax Heavy	Arrow	Rotax Max	14	(South Australia) Ian Williams
Ian Williams Tuning	Rotax Junior	Arrow	Rotax Junior Max	25	(South Australia) Rhys Newman
Ian Williams Tuning	Rotax Junior	Arrow	Rotax Junior Max	34	(South Australia) Brandon Stillwell
Ian Williams Tuning	Rotax Heavy	Omega	Rotax Max	61	(South Australia) Ryan Felmingham
Ian Williams Tuning	Rotax Light	Arrow	Rotax Max	71	(South Australia) Michael Rogers
McLaughlin Freight Lines P/L	Rotax Heavy	Hypermax Phoenix	Rotax Max	15	(Victoria (state)) Chris Jewell
Guards Australia	Rotax Heavy	Arrow	Rotax Max	17	(New South Wales) Alan Dodge
TWR; Raceline Seating	Rotax Heavy	Arrow	Rotax Max	27	(Victoria (state)) Rod Clarke
Badboy Power Drink	Rotax Heavy	Hypermax Phoenix	Rotax Max	30	(Victoria (state)) Leigh Cavallin
Suburban Accounting	Rotax Light	Hypermax Phoenix	Rotax Max	33	(Victoria (state)) Kristian Stebbing
Suburban Accounting	Rotax Light	Azzurro	Rotax Max	77	(Victoria (state)) Brad Stebbing
AMG Racing	Rotax Junior	Arrow	Rotax Junior Max	37	(South Australia) Mitchell Abbott
Specialist Doors & Windows	Rotax Light	Arrow	Rotax Max	39	(South Australia) Shaun Pannowitch
Specialist Doors & Windows	Rotax Light	Viper	Rotax Max	82	(South Australia) Matthew Pannowitch
NEC Automotive	Rotax Heavy	Allkart	Rotax Max	40	(Victoria (state)) Greg Bass
Brendan Luneman	Rotax Heavy	CRG	Rotax Max	41	(Victoria (state)) Brendan Luneman
Impact Flags & Banners	Rotax Light	Arrow	Rotax Max	46	(New South Wales) Colin Moore
Byrnbox Home Theatre PCs	Rotax Heavy	Monaco	Rotax Max	56	(Victoria (state)) David Byrne
Rockett Race Engines	Rotax Light	Birel	Rotax Max	57	(Victoria (state)) Darren Tyler
Racecentre	Rotax Junior	Arrow	Rotax Junior Max	66	(Victoria (state)) David Webster
Racecentre	Rotax Light	Arrow	Rotax Max	80	(Victoria (state)) Peter Strangis
www.kartsportnews.com	Rotax Heavy	Hypermax Phoenix	Rotax Max	75	(Victoria (state)) Mark Wicks
Doug Savage	Rotax Light	Arrow	Rotax Max	78	(South Australia) Doug Savage
Race Stickerz; Toyota Material Handling	Rotax Heavy	Techno	Rotax Max	84	(Victoria (state)) Scott Appledore
Wild Digital	Rotax Junior	Hypermax Phoenix	Rotax Junior Max	87	(Australian Capital Territory) Sean Whitfield
John Bartlett	Rotax Heavy	Hypermax Phoenix	Rotax Max	95	(South Australia) John Bartlett

== Results and standings ==
=== Gearbox race calendar ===
The 2008 Australian Superkart Championship season consisted of two rounds. Four races were held at both race meetings.

Rd.	Race title	Circuit	City / state	Date	Winner 250Int	Team	Winner 250Nat	Team	Winner 125	Team
NC	(New South Wales) V8 Supercar Support	Eastern Creek Raceway	Sydney, New South Wales	7–9 Mar	Warren McIlveen	Stockman Superkarts	Rick Setterfield	RMR Superkarts	Tony Lappas	IGA Superkart Racing
1	(New South Wales) Eastern Creek	Eastern Creek Raceway	Sydney, New South Wales	12–13 July	Darren Hossack	Safe Evolutions	Martin Latta	MJR Bricklaying	Brad Stebbing	Suburban Accounting
2	(South Australia) Mallala	Mallala Motor Sport Park	Mallala, South Australia	1–2 Nov	Gary Pegoraro	RMR Superkarts	Martin Latta	MJR Bricklaying	Anthony Lappas	Romeo's IGA Supermarkets

- NC - Non-championship point scoring round.

=== Non-gearbox race calendar ===
Rd.	Race title	Circuit	City / state	Date	Winner Light	Team	Winner Heavy	Team	Winner Junior	Team
NGB	(Victoria (state)) Phillip Island	Phillip Island Grand Prix Circuit	Phillip Island, Victoria	9–10 Aug	Michael Rogers	Ian Williams Tuning	Mark Wicks	kartsportnews.com	Sean Whitfield	Wild Digital

=== Drivers Championship ===
Points were awarded 20-17-15-13-11-10-9-8-7-6-5-4-3-2-1 based on the top fifteen race positions in first three races of each round with one point for each other finisher. The fourth race of each round, which is longer than the others (eight laps vs five laps) awarded points for the top twenty race positions at 25-22-20-18-16-15-14-13-12-11-10-9-8-7-6-5-4-3-2-1 with one point for each other finisher.

Pos	Driver	EAS 1	EAS 2	EAS 3	EAS 4	MAL 1	MAL 2	MAL 3	MAL 4	Pts
250 INTERNATIONAL
1	Darren Hossack	1st	1st	2nd	2nd	2nd	5th	6th	3rd	137
2	Sam Zavaglia	2nd	2nd	15th	1st	3rd	2nd	1st	2nd	134
3	Gary Pegoraro	3rd	10th	4th	3rd	4th	1st	2nd	1st	129
4	Warren McIlveen	Ret	7th	1st	4th	1st	3rd	3rd	Ret	97
5	Carlo Chermaz	4th	3rd	3rd	13th	8th	7th	13th	7th	85
6	Daniel Ramerman	21st	16th	12th	6th	6th	8th	4th	4th	70
7	Matthew Wall	6th	5th	5th	Ret	DNS	6th	7th	Ret	51
8	Ilya Harpas	11th	14th	14th	Ret	5th	4th	26th	5th	49
9	Ralf Rupprecht					7th	11th	5th	6th	40
10	Brett Purdie	19th	19th	21st	9th	9th	14th	8th	17th	39
11	Anton Stevens	8th	4th	8th	11th	Ret	Ret	Ret	DNS	39
11	Yiani Harpas	Ret	8th	7th	5th	Ret	10th	DNS	DNS	39
13	Kristian Stebbing	9th	13th	10th	Ret	10th	13th	Ret	8th	38
14	John Roberts	15th	18th	18th	7th	11th	Ret	DNS	10th	33
15	Jason Maros	14th	17th	11th	10th	Ret	DNS	11th	11th	33
16	Stephen Castles	7th	6th	6th	Ret					29
17	Wayne Sprostan					12th	12th	9th	9th	27
18	Mark Hanson	DNS	Ret	Ret	Ret	13th	9th	10th	13th	24
19	Rod Prickett	16th	21st	17th	8th	14th	15th	12th	Ret	23
20	Luke May	5th	9th	31st	Ret	DNS	DNS	DNS	DNS	19
21	Michael Treloar	27th	27th	25th	17th	20th	23rd	18th	19th	17
22	Steve Murray	12th	11th	9th	Ret					16
23	Gerrit Ruff	18th	20th	19th	12th					12
24	Brock Nicholas	25th	22nd	20th	14th	DNS	DNS	DNS	DNS	10
25	John Pellicano	13th	12th	13th	Ret					10
26	Jeff Burford					16th	Ret	14th	18th	9
27	George Koutros	26th	Ret	29th	24th					7
28	Chryss Jamieson	10th	Ret	Ret	DNS					6
29	Todd Johnson					15th	25th	17th	Ret	3
30	Greg Bass	17th	31st	16th	Ret					3
31	Karl Wilson	20th	15th	Ret	Ret					2
	Robert Oakley	Ret	DNS	DNS	DNS					
	Paul Snaith									
250 NATIONAL
1	Martin Latta	23rd	24th	23rd	16th	17th	16th	15th	15th	167
2	David Yuill	DNS	30th	24th	20th	18th	18th	16th	14th	130
3	Frank Giglio	28th	Ret	26th	21st	28th	Ret	25th	26th	96
4	Rick Setterfield	Ret	Ret	DNS	DNS	25th	17th	22nd	23rd	67
125 GEARBOX
1	Brad Stebbing	22nd	23rd	22nd	18th	21st	20th	23rd	22nd	147
2	Anthony Lappas	24th	25th	Ret	15th	19th	19th	19th	16th	144
3	Jarrod Lethborg	29th	26th	30th	23rd	26th	24th	23rd	27th	105
4	John Bakker	31st	29th	32nd	26th	24th	22nd	21st	25th	101
5	Tim Philp	Ret	28th	28th	22nd	23rd	27th	27th	24th	94
6	Steve Young	32nd	33rd	33rd	25th	30th	28th	28th	29th	80
7	Jason Smith	30th	Ret	27th	19th	27th	26th	Ret	DNS	69
8	John Pellicano					22nd	Ret	20th	20th	54
9	Craig Philp	Ret	32nd	34th	DNS	29th	DNS	DNS	28th	40
10	Jeff Reed	Ret	Ret	Ret	Ret	Ret	21st	Ret	21st	35
	Russell Jamieson	Ret	Ret	DNS	DNS					
	Darren Dunn									
Pos	Driver	EAS 1	EAS 2	EAS 3	EAS 4	MAL 1	MAL 2	MAL 3	MAL 4	Pts

Colour	Result
Gold	Winner
Silver	Second place
Bronze	Third place
Green	Points classification
Blue	Non-points classification
Blue	Non-classified finish (NC)
Purple	Retired, not classified (Ret)
Red	Did not qualify (DNQ)
Red	Did not pre-qualify (DNPQ)
Black	Disqualified (DSQ)
White	Did not start (DNS)
White	Withdrew (WD)
White	Race cancelled (C)
Blank	Did not practice (DNP)
Blank	Did not arrive (DNA)
Blank	Excluded (EX)

Pos	Driver	PHI 1	PHI 2	PHI 3	PHI 4	Pts
ROTAX MAX LIGHT
1	Michael Rogers	1st	1st	1st	1st	85
2	Tim Scarman	2nd	2nd	2nd	2nd	73
3	Shaun Jones	4th	4th	3rd	3rd	61
4	Jason McIntyre	3rd	3rd	4th	8th	56
5	Colin Moore	8th	5th	9th	5th	44
6	Kristian Stebbing	5th	10th	5th	10th	44
7	Doug Savage	16th	11th	6th	7th	41
8	Darren Tyler	18th	14th	7th	18th	34
9	Peter Strangis	Ret	13th	Ret	4th	26
10	Brad Stebbing	Ret	DNS	8th	6th	23
11	Shaun Pannowicth	Ret	30th	31st	31st	21
12	Matthew Pannowitch	11th	Ret	25th	DNS	15
ROTAX MAX HEAVY
1	Mark Wicks	6th	6th	10th	11th	82
2	Ryan Felmingham	7th	7th	11th	13th	69
3	Brendan Luneman	10th	8th	16th	9th	66
4	Rod Clarke	9th	9th	12th	14th	59
5	Colin McIntyre	17th	12th	21st	12th	45
6	Chris Jewell	26th	18th	18th	19th	35
7	Leigh Cavallin	15th	15th	23rd	30th	30
8	Ron Goldfinch	12th	20th	17th	32nd	30
9	Gerad McLeod	29th	22nd	20th	20th	28
10	Ian Williams	14th	14th	19th	Ret	26
11	Alan Dodge	13th	27th	29th	22nd	25
12	Matthew Palmer	25th	21st	26th	24th	23
13	Lee Filliponi	19th	23rd	27th	26th	22
14	Scott Appledore	20th	28th	DNS	25th	16
15	Greg Bass	27th	31st	32nd	23rd	15
16	David Byrne	24th	24th	Ret	27th	14
17	Greg Stillwell	30th	29th	28th	28th	11
18	John Bartlett	23rd	26th	24th	Ret	11
ROTAX MAX JUNIOR
1	Sean Whitfield	28th	16th	13th	15th	80
2	Mitchell Abbott	22nd	17th	14th	16th	73
3	Brandon Stillwell	32nd	25th	22nd	28th	57
4	Rhys Newman	21st	Ret	15th	17th	55
5	David Webster	31st	32nd	30th	29th	53
Pos	Driver	PHI 1	PHI 2	PHI 3	PHI 4	Pts
