= 2009 Australian Superkart Championship =

2009 Australian Superkart

Seasons
- ← 2008 2010 →

The 2009 Australian Superkart season covers national level Superkart racing in Australia during 2009. There were three national level race meetings in 2009 all held on the calendar of the Shannons Nationals Motor Racing Championships, the first two covered the Australian Superkart Championship, which was won by Sam Zavaglia. The third event, the stand-alone Pacific Superkart Challenge, was won by Warren McIlveen.

== Featured events ==
=== Australian Superkart Championship ===
The 2009 Australian Superkart Championship was the 21st running of the national championships for Superkarts. It began on 6 June 2009 at Mallala Motor Sport Park and end on 19 July at Eastern Creek Raceway after eight races. It was contested for two engine capacity based classes, 250 cc International (incorporating 250 National Class) and 125 cc. 125cc champion was Melbourne teenager, Steven Tamasi.

A third national level event was held later in the season at Morgan Park Raceway which was held for the 250 International, 125cc, the recently superseded 85cc class and the Rotax Max non-gearbox category.

=== Non-Gearbox Superkart Championship ===
With insufficient pre-registration, non-Gearbox Rotax Max championship was not contested in 2009.

== Teams and drivers ==
The following drivers competed in the 2009 Australian Superkart Championship. The series consisted of two rounds, with four races at each meeting. With only four competitors appearing from the 250 National class all season, the 250 Nationals were merged into the 250 International class.

Team	Class	Chassis	Engine	No	Driver
Safe Evolutions	250 International	Anderson Maverick	SAFE	1	(Victoria (state)) Darren Hossack
Safe Evolutions	250 International	Anderson Maverick	SAFE	12	(Victoria (state)) Shane Price
Rocket Race Engines	250 International	Anderson Mirage	FPE/RCS	4	(Victoria (state)) Rod Prickett
Top Dog Advertising	250 International	PVP	PVP	6	(Queensland) Vince Livaditis
RMR Superkarts	250 International	Anderson Maverick	FPE	7	(Victoria (state)) Colin McIntyre
RMR Superkarts	250 International	Anderson Maverick	BRC 250FE; FPE	10	(Victoria (state)) Gary Pegoraro
BK Electrical	125 Gearbox	Stockman MR2	Honda RS125	7	(Queensland) Barry Kunowski
Dunlop; Art Motorsport	250 International	PVP	PVP	8	(New Zealand) Anton Stevens
Cystic Fibrosis Queensland	125 Gearbox	Eliminator	Honda RS125	8	(Queensland) Iain McIntosh
Stockman Superkarts	250 International	Stockman MR2	Yamaha TZ250	9	(New South Wales) Sam Zavaglia
Stockman Superkarts	250 International	Stockman MR2	Honda RS250	18	(New South Wales) Warren McIlveen
Stockman Superkarts	250 International	Stockman MR2	Honda RS250	43	(South Australia) Dan Ramerman
Stockman Superkarts	250 International	Stockman MR2	Honda RS250	43	(Victoria (state)) Daniel Tamasi
Rockpress	125 Gearbox	Stockman MR2	Honda RS125	12	(Queensland) Phil Silcock
	125 Gearbox	Top Kart	Yamaha TZ125	13	(Victoria (state)) Mick Chiodo
Maddern Oil P/L	250 International	PVP	PVP	14	(South Australia) Charles Maddern
Coach Design	85 Gearbox	Gladiator	Yamaha YZ80	16	(Queensland) Lindsay Jamieson
Coach Design	85 Gearbox	Gladiator	Yamaha YZ80	26	(Queensland) Stewart Bell
Coach Design	125 Gearbox	Stockman MR2 Laydown	Honda RS125	32	(Queensland) Drene Jamieson
Coach Design	250 International	Stockman MR2	Honda RS250	35	(Queensland) Russell Jamieson
Coach Design	125 Gearbox	Stockman MR2 Laydown	Honda RS125	86	(Queensland) Chryss Jamieson
Arconn Refrigeration	125 Gearbox	Stockman MR2	Honda RS125	17	(Victoria (state)) Rod Conn
Sugarless Confectionery Co.	250 International	Stockman MR2	Yamaha TZ250	17	(Queensland) Phil Webb
Nick Paul	250 International	Stockman MR2	Honda RS250	21	(South Australia) Robert Oakley
Internode; Metaplanners; Davtec	250 International	Zip Eagle	BRC 250FE	28	(South Australia) Ilya Harpas
Internode; Metaplanners; Davtec	250 International	Zip Eagle II	BRC 250FE	29	(South Australia) Yiani Harpas
Suburban Accounting	250 International	Stockman MR2	Honda RS250	33	(Victoria (state)) Kristian Stebbing
Suburban Accounting	125 Gearbox	Stockman MR2	Yamaha TZ125	77	(Victoria (state)) Brad Stebbing
Cycle City	125 Gearbox	Stockman MR2	Honda RS125	34	(New South Wales) Jeff Reed
Top Torque	250 International	Stockman MR2	Honda RS250	40	(Victoria (state)) Stephen Castles
Jeff Burford	250 International	Zip Eagle II		41	(South Australia) Jeff Burford
Paul Snaith	250 International	Eliminator		44	(New South Wales) Paul Snaith
STR Truck Bodies	250 International	Stockman MR2		48	(Victoria (state)) Matthew Palmer
Bakker Superkarts	125 Gearbox	Bakker	Honda RS250	50	(Victoria (state)) Mick Bakker
N&G Motor Repairs; Iguana Signs & Concepts	125 Gearbox	Stockman MR2	Honda RS125	50	(Queensland) Brian Wild
Martelco Equipment Hire	250 International	Zip Eagle II	Yamaha TZ250	54	(South Australia) Brett Purdie
Crispy Racing	250 International	Anderson Maverick		58	(Victoria (state)) David Yuill
RFC Race Team	Rotax Max	Hypermax Phoenix	Rotax 125	60	(Queensland) David McAdam
RFC Race Team	Rotax Max	Hypermax Phoenix	Rotax 125	80	(Queensland) Richard Flanagan
Avoig Racing	125 Gearbox	Avoig Elise	Honda RS125	61; 161	(New South Wales) John Pellicano
Gas Action Services	250 International	PVP	Honda RS250	61	(Queensland) Steven Murray
	Rotax Max	CRG Maximo	Rotax 125	68	(Australian Capital Territory) Todd Gardner
Kylope Hire Cars	125 Gearbox	Benson	Honda RS125	69	(New South Wales) Mehmet Sinani
Darren O'Connor	250 International	Zip Eagle		70	(South Australia) Darren O'Connor
Lofty Coaches	250 International	Stockman MR2	Honda RS250	72	(South Australia) Dean McGinty
1800 Bumper	250 International	Stockman MR2	Honda RS250	74	(New South Wales) Jason Laker
Sundown Security	250 International	Stockman MR2	Honda RS250	88	(South Australia) Michael Davies
Domain Prestige Homes	125 Gearbox	Stockman MR2	Honda RS125	90	(Victoria (state)) Steven Tamasi
J. Shelton & Co	125 Gearbox	Stockman MR2	Honda RS125	93	(New South Wales) Jeremy Shelton
Phoenix Dental Laboratory	250 International	Zip Eagle II	Yamaha TZ250	96	(Western Australia) Mark Hanson
Bel-Ray / Prosport	250 International	PVP	Yamaha TZ250	250	(Queensland) Cameron Hoswell
Douglas Amiss	85 Gearbox	Gladiator	Yamaha YZ80	461	(Queensland) Doug Amiss

== Results and standings ==
=== Gearbox race calendar ===
The 2009 www.artmotorsport.com.au Australian Superkart Championship season consisted of two rounds. Four races were held at both race meetings. Likewise four races were held at the Pacific Superkart Challenge.

Rd.	Circuit	City / state	Date	Winner 250	Team	Winner 125	Team	Winner 85	Team	Winner Rotax	Team
1	(South Australia) Mallala Motor Sport Park	Mallala, South Australia	6–7 June	Sam Zavaglia	Stockman Superkarts	Steven Tamasi	Domain Prestige Homes				
2	(New South Wales) Eastern Creek Raceway	Sydney, New South Wales	18–19 July	Sam Zavaglia	Stockman Superkarts	Jeff Reed	Cycle City				
PSC	(Queensland) Morgan Park Raceway	Warwick, Queensland	8–9 August	Warren McIlveen	Stockman Superkarts	John Pellicano	Giova Design	Stewart Bell	Coach Design	David McAdam	RFC Race Team

=== Drivers Championship ===
Points were awarded 20-17-15-13-11-10-9-8-7-6-5-4-3-2-1 based on the top fifteen race positions in first three races of each round. The fourth race of each round, which is longer than the others (eight laps vs five laps) awarded points for the top twenty race positions at 25-22-20-18-16-15-14-13-12–11-10-9-8-7-6-5-4-3-2-1. Points sourced from in part:

Pos	Driver	MAL 1	MAL 2	MAL 3	MAL 4	EAS 1	EAS 2	EAS 3	EAS 4	Pts
250 INTERNATIONAL
1	Sam Zavaglia	1st	3rd	3rd	1st	1st	1st	1st	1st	160
2	Darren Hossack	3rd	4th	4th	3rd	4th	DNS	2nd	2nd	113
3	Gary Pegoraro	Ret	2nd	2nd	5th	2nd	DNS	Ret	3rd	87
4	Ilya Harpas	4th	5th	5th	4th	Ret	7th	8th	9th	82
5	Robert Oakley	8th	8th	14th	Ret	3rd	2nd	Ret	4th	67
6	Shane Price	Ret	6th	6th	2nd	Ret	3rd	9th	Ret	64
7	Russell Jamieson	10th	Ret	13th	10th	8th	6th	5th	7th	62
8	Yiani Harpas	2nd	1st	1st	Ret	Ret	Ret	DNS	DNS	57
9	Colin McIntyre	Ret	19th	Ret	Ret	6th	4th	3rd	6th	54
10	Stephen Castles	28th	12th	Ret	DNS	5th	5th	7th	5th	51
11	Jason Laker	9th	10th	9th	Ret	9th	22nd	6th	10th	50
12	Kristian Stebbing	27th	9th	7th	8th	Ret	19th	8th	Ret	46
13	Warren McIlveen	6th	7th	15th	6th	Ret	Ret	Ret	Ret	35
14	Brett Purdie	Ret	13th	12th	7th	10th	14th	Ret	Ret	31
15	Anton Stevens	5th	28th	10th	9th	DNS	DNS	DNS	DNS	30
16	Matthew Palmer	26th	26th	25th	17th	16th	11th	19th	16th	30
17	David Yuill	15th	21st	22nd	16th	Ret	13th	15th	11th	28
18	Vince Livaditis					7th	Ret	12th	8th	27
19	Charles Maddern	12th	11th	11th	14th	12th	DNS	DNS	DNS	26
20	Mark Hanson	11th	14th	Ret	Ret	Ret	8th	10th	Ret	21
21	Daniel Ramerman	7th	Ret	8th	Ret					17
22	Dean McGinty	13th	16th	17th	11th					15
23	Rod Prickett	DNS	20th	18th	12th					11
24	Paul Snaith	19th	15th	16th	13th					11
25	Jeff Burford	18th	17th	19th	15th					9
26	Frank Giglio					17th	20th	20th	Ret	8
27	Darren O'Connor	14th	18th	21st	19th					7
28	Michael Davies	Ret	Ret	20th	Ret					1
	Daniel Tamasi					DNS	DNS	DNS	DNS	0
125 GEARBOX
1	Steven Tamasi	17th	22nd	23rd	18th	13th	12th	16th	14th	147
2	Jeff Reed	16th	Ret	24th	21st	11th	9th	11th	12th	142
3	John Pellicano	20th	Ret	26th	20th	19th	21st	14th	13th	107
4	Rod Conn	22nd	24th	27th	22nd	15th	16th	18th	18th	106
5	Drene Jamieson	25th	25th	28th	Ret	18th	17th	17th	15th	82
6	Brad Stebbing	28th	Ret	Ret	Ret	14th	10th	13th	17th	75
7	Michael Chiodo					Ret	18th	22nd	19th	31
8	Mick Bakker					20th	15th	21st	DNS	31
9	Mehmet Sinani	24th	27th	29th	Ret					30
10	Chryss Jamieson	21st	23rd	Ret	DNS					30
Pos	Driver	MAL 1	MAL 2	MAL 3	MAL 4	EAS 1	EAS 2	EAS 3	EAS 4	Pts

Colour	Result
Gold	Winner
Silver	Second place
Bronze	Third place
Green	Points classification
Blue	Non-points classification
Blue	Non-classified finish (NC)
Purple	Retired, not classified (Ret)
Red	Did not qualify (DNQ)
Red	Did not pre-qualify (DNPQ)
Black	Disqualified (DSQ)
White	Did not start (DNS)
White	Withdrew (WD)
White	Race cancelled (C)
Blank	Did not practice (DNP)
Blank	Did not arrive (DNA)
Blank	Excluded (EX)

=== Rockpress Pacific Superkart Challenge ===
Points were awarded 401-300-225-169-127-95-71 based on the top race positions in each classe in each of the four races. There was an additional bonus points structure added, multiplying the points received by the number of karts entered in that competitors class, divided by the total number of entries for the field.

Pos	Driver	Race 1	Race 2	Race 3	Race 4	Bonus	Pts
250 INTERNATIONAL
1	Warren McIlveen	1st	1st	1st	1st	560	2164
2	Vince Livaditis	2nd	2nd	2nd	2nd	420	1620
3	Jason Laker	4th	3rd	4th	4th	259	991
4	Russell Jamieson	14th	5th	3rd	3rd	238	910
5	Steven Murray	3rd	4th	Ret	5th	182	703
6	Cameron Hoswell	7th	8th	7th	7th	154	598
7	Phil Webb	17th	13th	Ret	DNS	49	191
125 GEARBOX
1	John Pellicano	16th	6th	5th	6th	455	1753
2	Brian Wild	5th	9th	8th	8th	406	1557
3	Drene Jamieson	8th	7th	6th	9th	392	1517
4	Phil Silcock	9th	11th	10th	11th	259	991
5	Barry Kunowski	11th	12th	11th	15th	196	746
6	Jeremy Shelton	15th	16th	15th	16th	147	559
7	Iain McIntosh	DNS	19th	DNS	19th	49	191
85 GEARBOX
1	Stewart Bell	6th	10th	9th	10th	240	1844
2	Lindsay Jamieson	13th	17th	13th	12th	180	1380
3	Doug Amiss	Ret	18th	16th	17th	102	777
ROTAX MAX
1	David McAdam	10th	15th	12th	13th	225	1728
2	Todd Gardner	12th	14th	14th	14th	195	1496
3	Richard Flanagan	DNS	20th	17th	18th	102	777
Pos	Driver	Race 1	Race 2	Race 3	Race 4	Bonus	Pts

Colour	Result
Gold	Winner
Silver	Second place
Bronze	Third place
Green	Points classification
Blue	Non-points classification
Blue	Non-classified finish (NC)
Purple	Retired, not classified (Ret)
Red	Did not qualify (DNQ)
Red	Did not pre-qualify (DNPQ)
Black	Disqualified (DSQ)
White	Did not start (DNS)
White	Withdrew (WD)
White	Race cancelled (C)
Blank	Did not practice (DNP)
Blank	Did not arrive (DNA)
Blank	Excluded (EX)
