= Karting European Championship =

European kart racing championship

(Europe) FIA Karting European Championship
- Category: Kart racing
- Region: Europe
- Affiliations: CIK-FIA
- Inaugural season: 1962; 64 years ago
- Classes: OK, OK-J, KZ, KZ2, A&D-S, A&D-J
- Drivers' champion: (United Kingdom) Noah Baglin; (OK, Kart Republic–IAME); (United Kingdom) Will Green; (OK-J, Kart Republic–IAME); (France) Émilien Denner; (KZ, IPK–TM); (Finland) Kimi Tani; (KZ2, Parolin–TM)
- Official website: fiakarting.com

The FIA Karting European Championship, officially known as the Mondokart.com FIA Karting European Championship for sponsorship reasons, is a kart racing competition organised by the CIK-FIA. Alongside the Karting World Championship, it is one of two major karting competitions sanctioned by the FIA.

Seven past European Champions have progressed to win the Formula One World Drivers' Championship: Michael Schumacher (1987, ICA), Jenson Button (1997, FSA), Lewis Hamilton (2000, FA), Sebastian Vettel (2001, ICA-J), Max Verstappen (2013, KF and KZ), Lando Norris (2013, KF-J), and Andrea Kimi Antonelli (2020, 2021, OK). Other previous champions to win FIA World Championships in auto racing include Yvan Muller (1986, FK), Sébastien Buemi (2002, ICA-J), Kévin Estre (2004, ICA), James Calado (2005, ICA), Michael Christensen (2005, ICA-J), and Nyck de Vries (2009, KF3).

In recent years, European Championship has been contested across a season, where the World Championship is hosted as a single event. As of 2024, the European Championship is held across two direct-drive and three gearbox classes. The primary direct-drive class is OK, and the primary gearbox class is KZ.

== History ==
=== Debut as international contest (1962–1969) ===
The European Nations' Cup was the first competition held by the CIK-FIA upon its founding in 1962, won by Great Britain against Belgium, France, Italy, and Germany.

=== Expansion to individual competition (1970–1981) ===
The individual European Championship was first held in 1970, running a 100cc class won by Belgian driver François Goldstein, who retained his title in 1971. In 1979, Cathy Muller became the first woman to win a European title, doing so in the 100cc class. The senior category was contested under 100cc Intercontinental A (ICA) regulations until the introduction of the 135cc Formula K (FK) class in 1982, superseding ICA.

The gearbox category has since been added, first contested in 1974 in the Formula C (FC) class and won by Dutch driver Aad van Daalen. Between 1979 and 1981, a secondary gearbox class (FC-2) was held but did not return until Intercontinental C (ICC) was displaced as the lead gearbox class by FC in 1996. Gianfranco Baroni won four FC European Championships from 1976 to 1981.

=== New Formula regulations (1982–1992) ===
FK ran from 1982 to 1990, and again in 1992, as the primary senior class, until it was replaced by Formula A (FA) and its Super sub-class (FSA). In 1988 and 1989, the Formula Super 100 (S100) class was also contested as a main senior competition.

Michael Schumacher won the 1987 ICA European Championship, going on to become the first European Champion to also win the Formula One World Drivers' Championship in 1994.

In 1989, Jos Verstappen became the first driver to win two European Championships in the same season with his wins in FS100 and ICA, a feat only repeated in 2013 by his son Max.

ICC replaced FC as the primary gearbox class in 1983, having been the secondary class in 1982. Walter van Lent became the first non-Italian ICC European Champion in 1990, and the last in the primary gearbox class until Jonathan Thonon in 2008.

=== The Super era (1993–2006) ===
From 1993 to 2000, FSA became the pre-eminent class in the senior category, being run alongside its secondary FA class, as well as ICA. The 2000 season was notable for marking the start of the fierce rivalry between CRG teammates Lewis Hamilton and Nico Rosberg, who finished first and second in that year's FA European Championship, respectively. FA succeeded FSA as the lead class upon the latter's European demise at the end of the 2000 season.

In the gearbox category, ICC was again replaced by FC as the main class in 1996, becoming the secondary class once more. FC would later be renamed to Super-ICC from 2002 onwards.

The 250cc Superkart category was contested for the first time in 2002, going on to be contested at 18 successive European Championships.

=== Modern KF/OK and KZ era (2007–present) ===
In 2007, the primary senior class became KF1 and the primary gearbox class became KZ1, as the CIK-FIA attempted to re-brand global karting. The secondary divisions KF2 and KZ2 each replaced ICA and ICC; both classes had been contested since the early 1980s.

KF3 also succeeded Junior Intercontinental A (ICA-J) as the junior class, later renaming to KF-J in 2013. In 2009, the entire podium—Nyck de Vries, Carlos Sainz Jr. and Daniil Kvyat—went on to graduate to Formula One, the only time this has happened at the European Championship.

Between 2005 and 2008, Marco Ardigò won four consecutive senior titles with Tony Kart, remaining the only driver to complete a four-peat in the European Championship as of 2024. Ardigò is the only driver to have won five European Championships, adding a fifth title in KZ in 2016.

In 2013, Max Verstappen won both the KF and KZ European Championships with CRG, becoming the first—and to this date, only—driver to have won senior and gearbox titles in the same season.

KF2 became the primary senior category in 2010, replacing KF1—known as Super KF in 2009—and ending 28 seasons of secondary senior classes being held at the European Championship. After nine seasons of KF regulations in the senior category, the CIK-FIA shifted towards Original Kart (OK) regulations from 2016 onwards.

In 2017, Spanish-born Moroccan driver Sami Taoufik became the first non-European champion in a primary class, winning the OK European Championship with FA Kart.

The 2020 Superkart European Championship, originally scheduled to be hosted at Le Mans–Bugatti, was cancelled amidst the COVID-19 pandemic in Europe, ending its 18-year tenure under the CIK-FIA banner.

In 2020 and 2021, aged 14 and 15, Andrea Kimi Antonelli won back-to-back OK European Championships, becoming the youngest driver to win multiple primary senior European titles.

The KZ2-Masters class debuted at the 2024 KZ European Championship as a senior gearbox division, limited to drivers aged 35 and above. Italian driver Riccardo Nalon won its inaugural edition, driving for Parolin.

== Format ==
The senior, junior, and gearbox European Championships are contended on separate dates at various kart circuits across Europe.

=== Direct-drive category format ===
As of 2025, the direct-drive category is run across four separate three-day events, alongside the Senior Academy Trophy. On day one, drivers are sent out for free practice preceding qualifying practice, setting up the next day of Qualifying Heats (QH). These races then set the grids for Super Heats (SH), which in-turn sets up the Final (F), with points awarded in all three rounds.

=== Gearbox category format ===
As of 2025, the gearbox category is run across two separate three-day events, alongside the Junior Academy Trophy. As with the direct-drive category, the championship is contended via QH, SH and F, with points awarded in each.

== Live coverage ==
The championship is currently broadcast live on YouTube by the FIA with live footage, commentary and interviews for all rounds. The opening race of the 2021 direct-drive season at Genk had a record viewership of over 46 thousand people.

The FIA provide live timing for each European Championship round via the FIA Karting website.

== European Champions ==
Key
Drivers
*	Driver has competed in Formula One		
†	Formula One World Drivers' Champion		
‡	FIA World Champion in an auto racing discipline		
Tyres
B	Bridgestone	L	LeCont
C	Carlisle	M	Maxxis
D	Dunlop	M	MG Tires
G	Goodyear	M	Mojo
K	Komet	V	Vega

=== European Nations' Championship (1962–1976) ===
Year	European Champions	Drivers	Runners-up	Third place	Circuits
1962	(United Kingdom) Great Britain		Belgium	France	(France) Paris
1963	France	Jean-Michel Guillard	(United Kingdom) Great Britain	Belgium	4 (Note: The 1963 European Nations' Championship was a four-venue series held at: 1. Bergamo; 2. Vevey; 3. Frankfurt; 4. Paris.)
1964	Italy	Ugo Cancellieri			3 (Note: The 1963 European Nations' Championship was a three-venue series held at: 1. Vevey; 2. Munich; 3. Paris.)
1964	Italy	Oscar Costantini			3
1964	Italy	Guido Sala			3
1965	Italy (2)	Guido Sala			3 (Note: The 1963 European Nations' Championship was a three-venue series held at: 1. Vevey; 2. Leidschendam; 3. Paris.)
1966	Italy (3)	Susanna Raganelli	Netherlands	(United Kingdom) Great Britain	
1966	Italy (3)	Giulio Pernigotti	Netherlands	(United Kingdom) Great Britain	
1966	Italy (3)	Guido Sala	Netherlands	(United Kingdom) Great Britain	
1966	Italy (3)	Oscar Sala	Netherlands	(United Kingdom) Great Britain	
1966	Italy (3)	Duilio Truffo	Netherlands	(United Kingdom) Great Britain	
1967	France (2)	Monique Asselbur			
1968	West Germany	Ute Teichmann			
1969	West Germany (2)	Heli Brandhofer			
1969	West Germany (2)	Hans Heyer*			
1969	West Germany (2)	Carlheinz Peters			
1970	West Germany (3)	Heli Brandhofer			
1970	West Germany (3)	Hans Heyer*			
1970	West Germany (3)	Carlheinz Peters			
1971	West Germany (4)	Heli Brandhofer			
1971	West Germany (4)	Hans Heyer*			
1971	West Germany (4)	Carlheinz Peters			
1972	(United Kingdom) Great Britain (2)	Mickey Allen			
1972	(United Kingdom) Great Britain (2)	Terry Fullerton			
1972	(United Kingdom) Great Britain (2)	Mark Steeds			
1973	Italy (4)	Eddie Cheever*			
1973	Italy (4)	Gabriele Gorini			
1973	Italy (4)	Piero Necchi			
1973	Italy (4)	Riccardo Patrese*			
1974	Italy (5)	Eddie Cheever*			
1974	Italy (5)	Gabriele Gorini			
1974	Italy (5)	Piero Necchi			
1974	Italy (5)	Riccardo Patrese*			
1975	Italy (6)	Beppe Gabbiani*			
1975	Italy (6)	Gabriele Gorini			
1975	Italy (6)	Piero Necchi			
1975	Italy (6)	Felice Rovelli			
1976	Italy (7)	Gianfranco Baroni			(Sweden) Kristianstad

=== Senior classes (1970–present) ===
Senior classes have been contested at the European Championship since its inaugural 1970 edition, when it was won by Belgian driver François Goldstein in the 100cc class.

==== Primary senior class (1970–present) ====
Since 2016, the primary senior class has been Original Kart (OK). The class was previously called KF2, replacing KF1 as the primary class in 2010. KF1 had been called Formula A (FA) and Super 100 (FS100) from 1988 to 2006, which had been run secondary to its Super sub-class (FSA) and Formula K (FK) until 2000. FSA was the premier class from 1993 until its demise, with FK holding this honour from 1982 to 1992.

Marco Ardigò holds the record for most primary senior European Championships, with four consecutive titles from 2005 to 2008 with Tony Kart.

Year	European Champion	Chassis	Engine	Tyres	Runner-up	Third place	Class	Stroke
1970	(Belgium) François Goldstein	Robardie	Parilla				100cc	
1971	(Belgium) François Goldstein (2)	Taifun	Parilla				100cc	
1972	(Italy) Gabriele Gorini						100cc	
1973	(Italy) Gabriele Gorini (2)		Komet				100cc	
1974
1975	(Italy) Gabriele Gorini (3)		Komet				100cc	
1976
1977	(United Kingdom) Terry Fullerton	Zipkart	Parilla				FE	100cc
1978	(Belgium) Jean-Pierre Knops	Birel	Parilla				FE	100cc
1979	(France) Cathy Muller	Hutless	Parilla				FE	100cc
1980	(Austria) Toni Zöserl	Birel	Parilla				FE	100cc
1981	(Netherlands) Peter de Bruijn	Tecno	Parilla				ICA	100cc
1982	(Netherlands) Peter de Bruijn (2)	Tecno	Parilla				FK	135cc
1983	(United Kingdom) Mike Wilson	Birel	Parilla				FK	135cc
1984	(United Kingdom) Mike Wilson (2)	Birel	Parilla				FK	135cc
1985	(West Germany) Stefan Frietsch	Kalì	Komet	D			FK	135cc
1986	(France) Yvan Muller‡	Kalì	Komet				FK	135cc
1987	(Italy) Alessandro Zanardi*	Kalì	Komet				FK	135cc
1988	(Italy) Federico Gemmo	Tecno	Komet				FK	135cc
1989	(Belgium) Marc Goossens	Tecno	Komet				FK	135cc
1990	(Netherlands) Martijn Koene	Hutless	Rotax				FK	100cc
1991	(Italy) Massimiliano Orsini	Tony Kart	Rotax		(Italy) Giancarlo Fisichella*	(Italy) Jarno Trulli*	FK	100cc
1992	(Italy) Gianluca Beggio	Kalì	Rotax	B			FK	100cc
1993	(Italy) Nicola Gianniberti	Haase	Rotax	D			FSA	100cc
1994	(Italy) Jarno Trulli*	Tony Kart	Rotax	B	(Sweden) Johnny Mislijevic	(Italy) Nicola Gianniberti	FSA	100cc
1995	(Italy) Massimiliano Orsini (2)	Hutless	Italsistem	B	(Italy) Alessandro Manetti	(Italy) Jarno Trulli*	FSA	100cc
1996	(Sweden) Johnny Mislijevic	Tony Kart	Vortex	B			FSA	100cc
1997	(United Kingdom) Jenson Button†	Tecno	Rotax	B			FSA	100cc
1998	(Italy) Davide Forè	Tony Kart	Rotax	B			FSA	100cc
1999	(Italy) Giuseppe Palmieri	Hutless	Italsistem	B	(Italy) Sauro Cesetti	(Italy) Vitantonio Liuzzi*	FSA	100cc
2000	(Netherlands) Mario Siegers	Trulli	Vortex	B	(Italy) Davide Forè	(Netherlands) Benjamin van der Wakker	FSA	100cc
2001	(Netherlands) Carlo van Dam	Gillard	Parilla	B	(United Kingdom) Ben Hanley	(Netherlands) Bas Lammers	FA	100cc
2002	(Germany) David Hemkemeyer	Mach1	KZH	B	(Germany) Helmut Sanden	(Brazil) Átila Abreu	FA	100cc
2003	(Netherlands) Bas Lammers	Hutless	Vortex	B	(Italy) Davide Forè	(Finland) Teemu Nyman	FA	100cc
2004	(Netherlands) Nick de Bruijn	Gillard	Parilla	B	(Italy) Sauro Cesetti	(Italy) Davide Forè	FA	100cc
2005	(Italy) Marco Ardigò	Tony Kart	Vortex	B	(Italy) Sauro Cesetti	(United Kingdom) Jon Lancaster	FA	100cc
2006	(Italy) Marco Ardigò (2)	Tony Kart	Vortex	B	(United Kingdom) Riki Christodoulou	(France) Arnaud Kozlinski	FA	100cc
2007	(Italy) Marco Ardigò (3)	Tony Kart	Vortex	B	(United Kingdom) Gary Catt	(Denmark) Michael Christensen‡	KF1	125cc
2008	(Italy) Marco Ardigò (4)	Tony Kart	Vortex	B	(France) Arnaud Kozlinski	(United Kingdom) Gary Catt	KF1	125cc
2009	(Finland) Aaro Vainio	Maranello	Maxter	B	(France) Manuel Renaudie	(United Kingdom) Jason Parrott	SKF	125cc
2010	(Denmark) Nicolaj Møller Madsen	Energy	TM	B	(Belgium) Sebastien Bailly	(Finland) Teemu Suninen	KF2	125cc
2011	(Belgium) Sami Luka	Intrepid	TM	B	(Spain) Carlos Gil Jr.	(Denmark) Andreas Hansen	KF2	125cc
2012	(United Kingdom) Ben Barnicoat	ART	Parilla	V	(Monaco) Charles Leclerc*	(Italy) Felice Tiene	KF2	125cc
2013	(Netherlands) Max Verstappen†	CRG	TM	V	(France) Valentin Moineault	(Denmark) Christian Sørensen	KF	125cc
2014	(United Kingdom) Callum Ilott	Zanardi	Parilla	B	(Denmark) Nicklas Nielsen	(United Kingdom) Lando Norris†	KF	125cc
2015	(United Kingdom) Ben Hanley	Mad-Croc	TM	V	(United Kingdom) Tom Joyner	(Netherlands) Richard Verschoor	KF	125cc
2016	(Spain) Pedro Hiltbrand	CRG	Parilla	V	(United Kingdom) Tom Joyner	(Poland) Karol Basz	OK	125cc
2017	(Morocco) Sami Taoufik	FA Kart	Vortex	L	(Russia) Pavel Bulantsev	(Italy) Lorenzo Travisanutto	OK	125cc
2018	(Germany) Hannes Janker	KR	Parilla	B	(United Kingdom) Harry Thompson	(Spain) Pedro Hiltbrand	OK	125cc
2019	(Italy) Lorenzo Travisanutto	KR	Parilla	L	(Italy) Gabriele Minì	(United Kingdom) Dexter Patterson	OK	125cc
2020	(Italy) Andrea Kimi Antonelli†	KR	Parilla	L	(United Kingdom) Taylor Barnard	(United Kingdom) Joe Turney	OK	125cc
2021	(Italy) Andrea Kimi Antonelli† (2)	KR	IAME	M	(Brazil) Rafael Câmara*	(United Kingdom) Arvid Lindblad*	OK	125cc
2022	(United Kingdom) Kean Nakamura-Berta	KR	IAME	M	(Jamaica) Alex Powell	(United Kingdom) Joe Turney	OK	125cc
2023	(Netherlands) René Lammers	Parolin	TM	M	(Italy) Gabriel Gomez	(Jamaica) Alex Powell	OK	125cc
2024	(United Kingdom) Joe Turney	KR	IAME	M	(Italy) Gabriel Gomez	(Belgium) Thibaut Ramaekers	OK	125cc
2025	(Spain) Christian Costoya	Parolin	TM	M	(Australia) James Anagnostiadis	(United Kingdom) Zac Drummond	OK	125cc
2026	(United Kingdom) Noah Baglin	KR	IAME	M	(United Kingdom) Zac Drummond	(Netherlands) Dean Hoogendoorn	OK	125cc
Year	European Champion	Chassis	Engine	Tyres	Runner-up	Third place	Class	Stroke

==== Secondary senior classes (1982–2009) ====
Intercontinental A (ICA) was the secondary senior class from 1982 to 2006, being replaced by KF2 until its succession as the lead senior class in 2010. Formula A (FA) was also introduced as an alternative class to Formula K (FK)—and, later, Formula Super A (FSA)—running alongside ICA from 1990 to 2000.

Notable European Champions in the secondary senior classes include seven-time Formula One World Drivers' Champions Michael Schumacher and Lewis Hamilton, as well as two FIA World Endurance Champions: Kévin Estre and James Calado.

Year	European Champion	Chassis	Engine	Tyres	Runner-up	Third place	Class	Stroke
1982	(West Germany) Josef Bertzen	Zipkart	Parilla				ICA	100cc
1983	(Italy) Stefano Modena*	DAP	DAP				ICA	100cc
1984	(Italy) Stefano Modena* (2)	DAP	DAP				ICA	100cc
1985	(Finland) Jukka Virtanen	Birel	Parilla				ICA	100cc
1986	(Sweden) Linus Lundberg	Dino	Dino		(West Germany) Ralf Kelleners	(West Germany) Michael Schumacher†	ICA	100cc
1987	(West Germany) Michael Schumacher†	CRG	Parilla		(Italy) Alessandro Zanardi*		ICA	100cc
1988	(Denmark) Gert Munkholm	PCR	PCR				FS100	100cc
1988	(Netherlands) Martijn Koene	Tony Kart	Rotax				ICA	100cc
1989	(Netherlands) Jos Verstappen*	Hutless	Rotax				FS100	100cc
1989	(Netherlands) Jos Verstappen* (2)	Hutless	Rotax		(Netherlands) Mike Hezemans	(Italy) Massimiliano Orsini	ICA	100cc
1990	(Italy) Fabiano Belletti	All Kart	Parilla		(Finland) Jan Erik Löfgren	(Netherlands) Pierre Redeker	FA	100cc
1990	(France) Eddy Coubard	Dino	Rotax				ICA	100cc
1991	(Italy) Alessandro Manetti	Tony Kart	Rotax		(Italy) Gianluca Malandruco	(United Kingdom) Guy Smith	FA	100cc
1991	(Italy) Daniele Parrilla	Birel	Rotax		(Spain) Carlos Gil	(France) Nicolas Minassian	ICA	100cc
1992	(Italy) Daniele Parrilla (2)	Mari Kart	Italsistem		(Belgium) Bas Leinders	(Italy) Pietro Antonelli	FA	100cc
1992	(Italy) Oliver Fiorucci	Merlin	Atomik				ICA	100cc
1993	(Belgium) Guy de Nies	Tecno	Rotax		(France) David Terrien	(France) Olivier Fiorucci	FA	100cc
1993	(France) Arnaud Sarrazin	Tecno	Rotax		(France) Alban Martinet		ICA	100cc
1994	(Italy) Davide Forè	Tony Kart	Rotax		(France) Arnaud Sarrazin	(Italy) Luca Casazza	FA	100cc
1994	(Belgium) Narcis Callens	Biesse	Fox		(Italy) Michele Panigada	(Sweden) Kristian Valtonen	ICA	100cc
1995	(Italy) Giorgio Pantano*	CRG	Rotax		(Brazil) Gastão Fráguas	(France) Cédric Convers	FA	100cc
1995	(France) Arnaud Leconte	Tecno	Rotax		(Belgium) Renaud Kuppens	(France) Nicolas Turquois	ICA	100cc
1996	(Italy) Giorgio Pantano* (2)	CRG	CRG		(United Kingdom) Anthony Davidson*‡	(Italy) Sandro Marra	FA	100cc
1996	(France) Ludovic Veve	Biesse	Rotax		(France) Nicolas Turquois	(United Kingdom) James Hanson	ICA	100cc
1997	(Spain) Antonio García	Mari Kart	Italsistem		(France) Alban Martinet	(Brazil) André Nicastro	FA	100cc
1997	(Italy) Alessandro Balzan	Top-Kart	Comer		(Italy) Alessandro Piccolo	(Italy) Steve Molini	ICA	100cc
1998	(Portugal) César Campaniço	CRG	CRG		(Spain) Fernando Alonso†‡	(Austria) Riko Fürtbauer	FA	100cc
1998	(France) Julien Poncelet	CRG	CRG				ICA	100cc
1999	(France) Julien Poncelet	Hutless	Italsistem				FA	100cc
1999	(Italy) Stefano Fabi	Top-Kart	Comer	B	(France) Guillaume Capietto	(Monaco) Clivio Piccione	ICA	100cc
2000	(United Kingdom) Lewis Hamilton†	CRG	Parilla	B	(Germany) Nico Rosberg†	(Italy) Marco Ardigò	FA	100cc
2000	(France) Julien Menard	Tony Kart	Vortex				ICA	100cc
2001	(France) Jean-Philippe Guignet	Tony Kart	Vortex	V	(Italy) Francesco Antonucci	(Spain) Diégo Puyo	ICA	100cc
2002	(Belgium) Jonathan Thonon	CRG	Maxter	V	(Portugal) Filipe Albuquerque	(United Kingdom) Gary Catt	ICA	100cc
2003	(Italy) Nicola Bocchi	CRG	Maxter	V	(France) Armand Convers	(France) Alban Varutti	ICA	100cc
2004	(France) Kévin Estre‡	Sodi	TM	V	(United Kingdom) Jon Lancaster	(Netherlands) Henkie Waldschmidt	ICA	100cc
2005	(United Kingdom) James Calado‡	Tony Kart	Vortex	B	(France) Jean-Éric Vergne* (Note: Vergne is a two-time Formula E Champion, winning in 2017–18 and 2018–19. Formula E did not become an FIA World Championship until the 2020–21 season.)	(Italy) Alessandro Bressan	ICA	100cc
2006	(Italy) Nicola Nolé	CRG	TM	V	(France) Anthony Abbasse	(Denmark) Johan Jokinen	ICA	100cc
2007	(United Kingdom) Will Stevens*	Tony Kart	Vortex	D	(Spain) Miki Monrás	(Spain) Javier Tarancón	KF2	125cc
2008	(Italy) Flavio Camponeschi	Tony Kart	Vortex	D	(United Kingdom) Robert Foster-Jones	(Netherlands) Robin Frijns	KF2	125cc
2009	(United Kingdom) Jordan Chamberlain	Tony Kart	TM	D	(Italy) Matteo Beretta	(Spain) Jorge Pescador	KF2	125cc
Year	European Champion	Chassis	Engine	Tyres	Runner-up	Third place	Class	Stroke

=== Junior classes (1989–present) ===
==== Primary junior class (1989–present) ====
Since 2016, the junior class has been OK-Junior (OK-J) for drivers aged 12 to 14 in the year. The class was called Junior Intercontinental A (ICA-J) from 1989 to 2006, KF3 from 2007 to 2012, and KF-Junior (KF-J) from 2013 to 2015.

Due to the fast progression of racing drivers, OK-J has traditionally hosted the most Formula One prospects at the European Championship as notable drivers often graduate to junior formulae prior to reaching senior karting divisions such as OK and KZ. Notably, the entire 2009 podium—Nyck de Vries, Carlos Sainz Jr. and Daniil Kvyat—progressed to Formula One. Despite this, Sebastian Vettel and Lando Norris are the only two junior European Champions to also win the Formula One World Drivers' Championship.

George Russell is the only driver to win multiple junior European Championships, winning back-to-back in 2011 and 2012.

Year	European Champion	Chassis	Engine	Tyres	Runner-up	Third place	Class	Stroke
1989	(Italy) Gianluca Malandrucco	CRG	Parilla				ICA-J	100cc
1990	(Belgium) Bas Leinders	Tecno	Rotax				ICA-J	100cc
1991	(Spain) Jordi Surrallés	CRG	Parilla		(France) David Terrien	(France) Jérémie Dufour	ICA-J	100cc
1992	(Italy) Massimo Del Col	Tony Kart	Parilla				ICA-J	100cc
1993	(Italy) Max Russomando	Mike1	Parilla				ICA-J	100cc
1994	(Belgium) Philip Cloostermans	Birel	Parilla				ICA-J	100cc
1995	(Netherlands) Willemjan Keijzer	Haase	Titan				ICA-J	100cc
1996	(Italy) Marino Spinozzi	Tony Kart	Vortex				ICA-J	100cc
1997	(Netherlands) Nelson van der Pol	Tony Kart	Vortex				ICA-J	100cc
1998	(France) Franck Perera	Tony Kart	Vortex				ICA-J	100cc
1999	(Austria) Reinhard Kofler	Tony Kart	Vortex	V	(United Kingdom) Lewis Hamilton†	(Italy) Alessandro Bonetti	ICA-J	100cc
2000	(Germany) Michael Ammermüller	Tony Kart	Vortex		(France) Jean-Philippe Guignet	(Italy) Francesco Antonucci	ICA-J	100cc
2001	(Germany) Sebastian Vettel†	Tony Kart	Vortex	V	(Czech Republic) Michael Vorba	(Germany) Patrick Lumma	ICA-J	100cc
2002	(Switzerland) Sébastien Buemi*‡	CRG	Maxter	V	(Netherlands) Henkie Waldschmidt	(Denmark) Nikolaj Bollingtoft	ICA-J	100cc
2003	(Italy) Nicholas Risitano	Birel	TM	V	(United Kingdom) James Calado‡	(Finland) Atte Mustonen	ICA-J	100cc
2004	(Monaco) Stefano Coletti	Birel	Parilla	V	(France) Jules Bianchi*	(United Kingdom) James Calado‡	ICA-J	100cc
2005	(Denmark) Michael Christensen‡	Gillard	Parilla	B	(Netherlands) Nigel Melker	(France) Charles Pic*	ICA-J	100cc
2006	(Spain) Miki Monrás	Maranello	Parilla	V	(United Kingdom) Scott Jenkins	(Italy) Felice Tiene	ICA-J	100cc
2007	(United Kingdom) Jack Harvey	Maranello	XTR	D	(United Kingdom) Tom Grice	(United Kingdom) James Thorp	KF3	125cc
2008	(Finland) Aaro Vainio	Maranello	Maxter	D	(Finland) Joni Wiman	(Russia) Daniil Kvyat*	KF3	125cc
2009	(Netherlands) Nyck de Vries*‡	Zanardi	Parilla	V	(Spain) Carlos Sainz Jr.*	(Russia) Daniil Kvyat*	KF3	125cc
2010	(United Kingdom) Alexander Albon*	Intrepid	TM	D	(France) Pierre Gasly*	(United Kingdom) Harrison Scott	KF3	125cc
2011	(United Kingdom) George Russell*	Intrepid	TM	V	(Sweden) Robin Hansson	(United Kingdom) Connor Jupp	KF3	125cc
2012	(United Kingdom) George Russell* (2)	Tony Kart	Vortex	V	(Spain) Álex Palou	(France) Dorian Boccolacci	KF3	125cc
2013	(United Kingdom) Lando Norris†	FA Kart	Vortex	L	(United Kingdom) Dan Ticktum	(Netherlands) Martijn van Leeuwen	KF-J	125cc
2014	(United Kingdom) Enaam Ahmed	FA Kart	Vortex	V	(Germany) Mick Schumacher* (Note: Mick Schumacher competed under the pseudonym "Mick Junior" in 2014.)	(Canada) Devlin DeFrancesco	KF-J	125cc
2015	(Denmark) Christian Lundgaard	Tony Kart	Vortex	L	(Indonesia) Presley Martono	(Belgium) Kenny Roosens	KF-J	125cc
2016	(United Kingdom) Finlay Kenneally	FA Kart	Vortex	V	(Denmark) Noah Watt	(France) Victor Martins	OK-J	125cc
2017	(United Kingdom) Jonny Edgar	Exprit	TM	L	(United Kingdom) Harry Thompson	(Australia) Jack Doohan*	OK-J	125cc
2018	(Estonia) Paul Aron	FA Kart	Vortex	V	(Italy) Gabriele Minì	(Brazil) Gabriel Bortoleto*	OK-J	125cc
2019	(France) Marcus Amand	Kosmic	Parilla	L	(Italy) Andrea Kimi Antonelli†	(Netherlands) Thomas ten Brinke	OK-J	125cc
2020	(United States) Ugo Ugochukwu	KR	Parilla	L	(United Kingdom) Arvid Lindblad*	(Finland) Tuukka Taponen	OK-J	125cc
2021	(United Kingdom) Freddie Slater	Kosmic	Vortex	M	(Brazil) Matheus Ferreira	(Belgium) Ean Eyckmans	OK-J	125cc
2022	Anatoly Khavalkin	Parolin	TM	V	(Poland) Jan Przyrowski	(United Kingdom) Nathan Tye	OK-J	125cc
2023	(Ukraine) Oleksandr Bondarev	KR	IAME	V	(Belgium) Thibaut Ramaekers	(Italy) Iacopo Martinese	OK-J	125cc
2024	(Belgium) Dries Van Langendonck	Exprit	TM	M	(Spain) Christian Costoya	(Italy) Iacopo Martinese	OK-J	125cc
2025	(Netherlands) Dean Hoogendoorn	KR	IAME	M	(Australia) William Calleja	(United Kingdom) Noah Baglin	OK-J	125cc
2026	(United Kingdom) Will Green	KR	IAME	M	(Spain) Daniel Miron Lorente	(France) Many Nuvolini	OK-J	125cc
Year	European Champion	Chassis	Engine	Tyres	Runner-up	Third place	Class	Stroke

==== Cadet class (1993–2001) ====
From 1992 to 2001, the Green Helmet Trophy was contested for cadets aged 7 to 13 under 100cc Intercontinental A (ICA) regulations, originally known as the Rainbow Trophy. The Karting Academy Trophy is regarded as its spiritual successor.

Year	Winner	Chassis	Engine	Tyres	Runner-up	Third place	Class	Stroke
1992	(Italy) Ennio Gandolfi	Kalì	Comer	V	(Denmark) Nicolas Kiesa*	(Netherlands) Marco du Pau	Cadet	100cc
1993	(Italy) Giorgio Pantano*	Kalì	Parilla	V	(United Kingdom) Doug Bell	(Italy) Thomas Pichler	Cadet	100cc
1994	(Spain) Antonio García				(Italy) Matteo Grassotto	(Serbia) Miloš Pavlović	Cadet	100cc
1995	(Germany) André Lotterer*‡	Tony Kart	Italsistem	V	(Italy) Matteo Meneghello	(Spain) Fernando Alonso†‡	Cadet	100cc
1996	(Netherlands) Nelson van der Pol	Tony Kart	Vortex	B			Cadet	100cc
1997	(Netherlands) Michael Koel				(United Kingdom) Mike Conway‡	(Germany) Marvin Bylitza	Cadet	100cc
1998	(Portugal) Álvaro Parente	Tony Kart	Vortex	B	(Poland) Robert Kubica*	(Netherlands) Georigi Garittsen	Cadet	100cc
1999	(Switzerland) Cyndie Allemann	Hutless	Italsistem	B	(Germany) Marcel Jeleniowski	(United Kingdom) Paul di Resta*	Cadet	100cc
2000	(Italy) Valentino Sebastiani				(Germany) Marcel Jeleniowski	(Germany) Mario Josten	Cadet	100cc
2001	(Czech Republic) Erik Janiš	Birel	TM	V	(Germany) Nico Hülkenberg*	(Italy) Marco Mapelli	Cadet	100cc
Year	European Champion	Chassis	Engine	Tyres	Runner-up	Third place	Class	Stroke

=== Gearbox classes (1974–present) ===
125cc gearbox classes have been contested at the European Championship since 1974, when it was won by British driver Aad van Daalen in the Formula C class.

==== Primary gearbox class (1974–present) ====
Since 2002, the primary gearbox class in the European Championship has been KZ, previously known as Super-ICC (S-ICC) until 2006 and KZ1 until 2012. KZ superseded Formula C (FC), which had been the primary class since 1974. Intercontinental C (ICC) was contested in place of FC from 1983 to 1995.

Italian drivers have historically dominated the KZ class, winning 39 of the 52 championships altogether, as of 2024. Gianfranco Baroni and Francesco Laudato hold the joint-record for most KZ European Championships, each with four. In 2002, the championship was shared ex-aequo by Laudato and Sauro Cesetti, who both scored 86 points. Max Verstappen is the only driver to win both the KZ European Championship and the Formula One World Drivers' Championship.

Year	European Champion	Chassis	Engine	Tyres	Runner-up	Third place	Class	Stroke
1974	(Netherlands) Aad van Daalen	Landia	Yamaha				FC	125cc
1975	(Netherlands) Ben van Velzen	Mach1	Yamaha				FC	125cc
1976	(Italy) Gianfranco Baroni	All Kart	BMC				FC	125cc
1977	(Italy) Gianfranco Baroni (2)	All Kart	BMC				FC	125cc
1978	(Italy) Gianfranco Baroni (3)	All Kart	BMC				FC	125cc
1979	(Italy) Giancarlo Vanaria	Kalì	Pavesi	B			FC	125cc
1980	(West Germany) Frank Leuze	Mach1	KZH				FC	125cc
1981	(Italy) Gianfranco Baroni (4)	Birel	BMC				FC	125cc
1982	(Italy) Alessandro Piccini	All Kart	Morbidelli				FC	125cc
1983	(Italy) Pier Mario Cantoni	All Kart	Pavesi				ICC	125cc
1984	(Italy) Riccardo Franchini	Kalì	Pavesi	D			ICC	125cc
1985	(Italy) Pietro Sassi	Birel	Pavesi				ICC	125cc
1986	(Italy) Lamberto di Ferdinando	Kalì	Pavesi	B			ICC	125cc
1987	(Italy) Paolo Pulliero	Kalì	Pavesi	B			ICC	125cc
1988	(Italy) Vincenzo Saitta	Kalì	Pavesi	V			ICC	125cc
1989	(Italy) Gianluca Paglicci	Kalì	Kalì	B			ICC	125cc
1990	(Netherlands) Walter van Lent	All Kart	TM				ICC	125cc
1991	(Italy) Roberto Motagnani	Tony Kart	TM				ICC	125cc
1992	(Italy) Stefano Rodano	Kalì	TM	D			ICC	125cc
1993	(Italy) Stefano Marcolin	Kalì	TM	D			ICC	125cc
1994	(Italy) Vincenzo Azzolina	Gold	Pavesi				ICC	125cc
1995	(Italy) Paolo Gagliardini	Birel	TM				ICC	125cc
1996	(Italy) Alessandro Piccini (2)	CRG	Pavesi	B			FC	125cc
1997	(Italy) Gianluca Beggio	Birel	TM	B			FC	125cc
1998	(Italy) Gianluca Beggio (2)	Birel	TM	B			FC	125cc
1999	(Italy) Ronnie Quintarelli	Tony Kart	Vortex	B	(Italy) Francesco Laudato	(Italy) Sauro Cesetti	FC	125cc
2000	(Italy) Francesco Laudato	Birel	TM	B	(Italy) Gianluca Beggio	(Sweden) Milton Ryttarbris	FC	125cc
2001	(Italy) Alessandro Piccini (3)	CRG	TM	B	(Sweden) Milton Ryttarbris	(Italy) Ennio Gandolfi	FC	125cc
2002 (Note: The 2002 championship was shared ex-aequo by Francesco Laudato and Sauro Cesetti, who both scored 86 points. Some sources have Laudato listed as the outright champion.)	(Italy) Francesco Laudato (2) (Italy) Sauro Cesetti	Birel; Kosmic	TM; Vortex	B B	None	(Italy) Alessandro Piccini	S-ICC	125cc
2003	(Italy) Alessandro Manetti	CRG	Pavesi	D	(Italy) Sauro Cesetti	(France) Arnaud Kozlinski	S-ICC	125cc
2004	(Italy) Francesco Laudato (3)	Birel	TM	V	(Italy) Roberto Toninelli	(Italy) Alessandro Manetti	S-ICC	125cc
2005	(Italy) Francesco Laudato (4)	Birel	TM	V	(Italy) Andrea Benedetti	(Italy) Roberto Toninelli	S-ICC	125cc
2006	(Italy) Roberto Toninelli	BRM	TM	V	(Italy) Alessandro Manetti	(Italy) Alessandro Piccini	S-ICC	125cc
2007	(Italy) Alessandro Manetti (2)	Intrepid	TM	D	(Belgium) Jonathan Thonon	(France) Jérémy Iglesias	KZ1	125cc
2008	(Belgium) Jonathan Thonon	CRG	Maxter	D	(Belgium) Rick Dreezen	(Netherlands) Bas Lammers	KZ1	125cc
2009	(Netherlands) Bas Lammers	Intrepid	TM	D	(France) Jérémy Iglesias	(Belgium) Jonathan Thonon	KZ1	125cc
2010	(Netherlands) Bas Lammers (2)	Intrepid	TM	D	(France) Jérémy Iglesias	(France) Thomas Mich	KZ1	125cc
2011	(Italy) Paolo De Conto	Energy	TM	D	(Netherlands) Yannick de Brabander	(France) Armand Convers	KZ1	125cc
2012	(Netherlands) Jorrit Pex	CRG	TM	B	(Italy) Davide Forè	(France) Arnaud Kozlinski	KZ1	125cc
2013	(Netherlands) Max Verstappen†	CRG	TM	B	(Italy) Marco Ardigò	(France) Anthony Abbasse	KZ	125cc
2014	(Belgium) Rick Dreezen	Zanardi	Parilla	B	(Belgium) Jonathan Thonon	(Italy) Marco Ardigò	KZ	125cc
2015	(Italy) Flavio Camponeschi	Tony Kart	Vortex	B	(Italy) Marco Ardigò	(United Kingdom) Ben Hanley	KZ	125cc
2016	(Italy) Marco Ardigò	Tony Kart	TM	V	(Czech Republic) Patrik Hájek	(France) Jérémy Iglesias	KZ	125cc
2017	(Italy) Paolo De Conto (2)	CRG	TM	B	(Czech Republic) Patrik Hájek	(Netherlands) Marijn Kremers	KZ	125cc
2018	(Netherlands) Jorrit Pex (2)	CRG	TM	L	(France) Jérémy Iglesias	(Italy) Fabian Federer	KZ	125cc
2019	(Netherlands) Jorrit Pex (3)	KR	TM	B	(Italy) Lorenzo Camplese	(France) Anthony Abbasse	KZ	125cc
2020	(Netherlands) Marijn Kremers	Ricciardo	TM	V	(Italy) Alessandro Irlando	(Finland) Simo Puhakka	KZ	125cc
2021	(Italy) Riccardo Longhi	Birel ART	TM	M	(Spain) Pedro Hiltbrand	(Italy) Paolo Ippolito	KZ	125cc
2022	(Italy) Paolo Ippolito	KR	IAME	L	(Italy) Matteo Vigano	(Netherlands) Senna van Walstijn	KZ	125cc
2023	(Italy) Danilo Albanese	KR	IAME	L	(France) Jérémy Iglesias	(Netherlands) Senna van Walstijn	KZ	125cc
2024	(Italy) Lorenzo Travisanutto	Parolin	TM	D	(Netherlands) Senna van Walstijn	(Sweden) Viktor Gustavsson	KZ	125cc
2025	(France) Mattéo Spirgel	Sodi	TM	D L	(Spain) Pedro Hiltbrand	(Italy) Giuseppe Palomba	KZ	125cc
2026	(France) Émilien Denner	IPK	TM	L	(Italy) Danilo Albanese	(Sweden) Viktor Gustavsson	KZ	125cc
Year	European Champion	Chassis	Engine	Tyres	Runner-up	Third place	Class	Stroke

==== Secondary gearbox class (1979–present) ====
Since 2007, the secondary gearbox class in the European Championship has been KZ2, replacing Intercontinental C (ICC) in international competition. Formula C-2 (FC-2) was contested from 1979 to 1981.

Italian drivers Valerio Sapere and Fabian Federer are the only drivers to win multiple KZ2 European Championships, achieving their second victories in 2000 and 2016, respectively.

Year	European Champion	Chassis	Engine	Tyres	Runner-up	Third place	Class	Stroke
1979	(Sweden) Jan Svaneby	Kalì	Rotax	B			FC-2	125cc
1980	(Czechoslovakia) Milan Šimák	Šimák	MS				FC-2	125cc
1981	(Italy) Gianfranco Baroni	Birel	Rotax				FC-2	125cc
1982	(Italy) Mario Bertuzzi	All Kart	Rotax				ICC	125cc
1983 – 1995	No secondary gearbox class contested							
1996	(Germany) Stefan Haak	CRG	TM	D			ICC	125cc
1997	(Italy) Filippo Flenghi	Birel	TM				ICC	125cc
1998	(Italy) Valerio Sapere	Birel	TM				ICC	125cc
1999	(France) Claude Monteiro	Birel	TM		(Italy) Alessandro Sferrella	(San Marino) Christian Montanari	ICC	125cc
2000	(Italy) Valerio Sapere (2)	CRG	Pavesi	V	(Italy) Gianluca Antonini	(Czech Republic) Johannes Schmidtler	ICC	125cc
2001	(Italy) Alessandro Sferrella	Top-Kart	Pavesi		(Germany) Peter Elkmann	(Italy) Devid de Luchi	ICC	125cc
2002	(Netherlands) Robert Dirks	Birel	Pavesi	D	(Italy) Gianpaolo Viani	(Italy) Roberto Profico	ICC	125cc
2003	(Italy) Manuel Cozzaglio	Birel	Pavesi	V	(Italy) Massimiliano Colombo	(Netherlands) Danny Bleek	ICC	125cc
2004	(Netherlands) Ricardo van der Ende	Energy	TM	V	(Netherlands) Johan van Dreven	(Netherlands) Toine Marsé	ICC	125cc
2005	(Czech Republic) Erik Janiš	Birel	Pavesi	B	(Netherlands) Danny Bleek	(Italy) Stefano Albertini	ICC	125cc
2006	(Germany) Ernst Behrens	Energy	TM	V	(Switzerland) Ken Allemann	(Italy) Alessandro Giulietti	ICC	125cc
2007	(Netherlands) Thomas Knopper	PCR	TM	D	(Belgium) Rick Dreezen	(Italy) Michele Santolini	KZ2	125cc
2008	(France) Tony Lavanant	Energy	TM	B	(Netherlands) Kevin Jansen	(France) Joffrey Demanse	KZ2	125cc
2009	(Italy) Angelo Lombardo	Tony Kart	Vortex	B	(Czech Republic) Patrik Hájek	(Italy) Riccardo Piccoli	KZ2	125cc
2010	(Italy) Paolo De Conto	Energy	TM	V	(France) Yan Pesce	(Netherlands) Kevin Leijtens	KZ2	125cc
2011	(Italy) Fabian Federer	CRG	TM	B	(Sweden) Joel Johansson	(Italy) Mirko Torsellini	KZ2	125cc
2012	(Lithuania) Simas Juodvirsis	Energy	TM	V	(Germany) Michele Di Martino	(Germany) Marvin Meindorfer	KZ2	125cc
2013	(Norway) Emil Antonsen	DR	TM	B	(Sweden) Joel Johansson	(Italy) Felice Tiene	KZ2	125cc
2014	(Italy) Andrea Dalè	CRG	Maxter	B	(Sweden) Douglas Lundberg	(Lithuania) Simas Juodvirsis	KZ2	125cc
2015	(Sweden) Joel Johansson	Energy	TM	L	(Spain) Pedro Hiltbrand	(Denmark) Andreas Fasberg	KZ2	125cc
2016	(Italy) Fabian Federer (2)	CRG	TM	B	(Netherlands) Stan Pex	(Italy) Matteo Vigano	KZ2	125cc
2017	(Germany) Leon Köhler	Tony Kart	Vortex	V	(Italy) Paolo Ippolito	(Italy) Alessandro Irlando	KZ2	125cc
2018	(France) Adrien Renaudin	Sodi	TM	L	(Italy) Giacomo Pollini	(France) Émilien Denner	KZ2	125cc
2019	(Sweden) Emil Skärås	Energy	TM	B	(France) Émilien Denner	(Italy) Paolo Besancenez	KZ2	125cc
2020	(Sweden) Viktor Gustavsson	Birel ART	TM	V	(Italy) Simone Cunati	(Germany) David Trefilov	KZ2	125cc
2021	(Italy) Giacomo Pollini	CRG	TM	M	(Netherlands) Senna van Walstijn	(Netherlands) Laurens van Hoepen	KZ2	125cc
2022	(France) Tom Leuillet	Birel ART	TM	L	(Germany) David Trefilov	(Italy) Alessio Piccini	KZ2	125cc
2023	(United Kingdom) Freddie Slater	Birel ART	TM	L	(Romania) Daniel Vasile	(Latvia) Tomass Štolcermanis	KZ2	125cc
2024	(France) Mattéo Spirgel	Sodi	TM	D	(Romania) Daniel Vasile	Maksim Orlov	KZ2	125cc
2025	Maksim Orlov	Sodi	TM	D L	(Estonia) Markus Kajak	(Germany) Maximilian Schleimer	KZ2	125cc
2026	(Finland) Kimi Tani	Parolin	TM	L	(Brazil) Matheus Morgatto	(Germany) Maximilian Schleimer	KZ2	125cc
Year	European Champion	Chassis	Engine	Tyres	Runner-up	Third place	Class	Stroke

==== Senior gearbox class (2024–2025) ====
Since 2022, the FIA have sanctioned a Masters sub-class for KZ2 at the World Championship, limited to drivers aged 35 and above. The KZ2-Masters class held its inaugural European Championship season in 2024, won by Italian driver Riccardo Nalon.

Year	European Champion	Chassis	Engine	Tyres	Runner-up	Third place	Class	Stroke
2024	(Italy) Riccardo Nalon	Parolin	TM	D	(France) Anthony Abbasse	(Croatia) Kristijan Habulin	KZ2-M	125cc
2025	(Italy) Antonio Piccioni	TK	TM	D	(Croatia) Kristijan Habulin	(Italy) Fabio Bifulco	KZ2-M	125cc

=== Superkart classes (1976–2019) ===
From 1976 to 1995 and 2002 to 2019, the 250cc superkart category was contested at the European Championship. This category also includes the Superkart-2 (SK-2) division, contested in 2003 and 2004.

==== Primary superkart class (1976–2019) ====
The superkart (SK) class was contested for 18 seasons, predominantly being dominated by British and French drivers. Dave Buttigieg, Martin Hines, and Peter Elkmann each won a joint-record four superkart European Championships.

Year	European Champion	Chassis	Engine	Tyres	Runner-up	Third place	Class	Stroke
1976	(United Kingdom) Dave Buttigieg						FE	250cc
1977	(United Kingdom) Martin Hines						FE	250cc
1978	(United Kingdom) Dave Buttigieg (2)						FE	250cc
1979	(Denmark) Poul Petersen						FE	250cc
1980	(Sweden) Lennart Bohlin						FE	250cc
1981	(United Kingdom) Robert J. Kerkhoven						FE	250cc
1982	(United Kingdom) Dave Buttigieg (3)						FE	250cc
1983	(Norway) Torgjer Kleppe						FE	250cc
1984	(United Kingdom) Reg Gange						FE	250cc
1985	(Denmark) Poul Petersen (2)						FE	250cc
1986	(United Kingdom) Martin Hines (2)						FE	250cc
1987	(Sweden) Lennart Bohlin (2)						FE	250cc
1988	(France) Éric Gassin						FE	250cc
1989	(Sweden) Stefan Rindeström						FE	250cc
1990	(United Kingdom) Ian Shaw						FE	250cc
1991	(United Kingdom) Dave Buttigieg (4)						FE	250cc
1992	(United Kingdom) Stuart Mead						FE	250cc
1993	(United Kingdom) Martin Hines (3)						FE	250cc
1994	(United Kingdom) Adam Wilcox						ICE	250cc
1995	(United Kingdom) Steven Webb						ICE	250cc
1996 – 2001	No superkart class contested							
2002	(United Kingdom) Martin Hines (4)	Zipkart	Rotax		(Norway) Torgjer Kleppe	(Sweden) Bobo Westman	SK	250cc
2003	(France) Damien Payart	PVP	FPE	B	(United Kingdom) Martin Hines	(France) François Vinuales	SK-1	250cc
2004	(France) Damien Payart (2)	PVP	FPE	B	(France) Benjamin Mahé	(France) François Vinuales	SK-1	250cc
2005	(United Kingdom) John Riley	Anderson	Rotax	B	(France) Damien Payart	(Austria) Andreas Mairzedt	SK	250cc
2006	(United Kingdom) Graham Barker	Anderson	Rotax	B	(United Kingdom) John Riley	(France) Damien Payart	SK-1	250cc
2007	(United Kingdom) Gavin Bennett	Anderson	Rotax	B	(United Kingdom) Malcolm Crowe	(Sweden) Michael Wärn	SK	250cc
2008	(Germany) Peter Elkmann	MS	Yamaha	B	(France) Benjamin Mahé	(France) Damien Payart	SK	250cc
2009	(United Kingdom) Gavin Bennett (2)	Anderson	FPE; DEA	D	(France) Damien Payart	(Germany) Peter Elkmann	SK	250cc
2010	(United Kingdom) Gavin Bennett (3)	Anderson	DEA		(France) Damien Payart	(United Kingdom) Trevor Roberts	SK	250cc
2011	(France) Emmanuel Vinuales	Anderson	DEA		(United Kingdom) Gavin Bennett	(Germany) Daniel Hentschel	SK	250cc
2012	(United Kingdom) Lee Harpham	Anderson	FPE		(Netherlands) Marcel Maasmann	(Denmark) Henrik Lilja	SK	250cc
2013	(France) Emmanuel Vinuales (2)	Anderson	DEA	D	(United Kingdom) Gavin Bennett	(Czech Republic) Adam Kout	SK	250cc
2014	(France) Emmanuel Vinuales (3)	Anderson	DEA	D	(Czech Republic) Adam Kout	(Germany) Peter Elkmann	SK	250cc
2015	(Czech Republic) Adam Kout	MS	DEA	D	(Germany) Peter Elkmann	(United Kingdom) Liam Morley	SK	250cc
2016	(Czech Republic) Adam Kout (2)	MS	DEA	D	(Germany) Peter Elkmann	(Belgium) Yannick de Brabander	SK	250cc
2017	(Germany) Peter Elkmann (2)	Anderson	VM	D	(Czech Republic) Adam Kout	(United Kingdom) Liam Morley	SK	250cc
2018	(Germany) Peter Elkmann (3)	Anderson	VM	D	(Czech Republic) Adam Kout	(Belgium) Yannick de Brabander	SK	250cc
2019	(Germany) Peter Elkmann (4)	Anderson	VM	D	(United Kingdom) Liam Morley	(Germany) Andreas Jost	SK	250cc
2020 – 2022	Cancelled due to the COVID-19 pandemic							
Year	European Champion	Chassis	Engine	Tyres	Runner-up	Third place	Class	Stroke

==== Secondary superkart class (1989–2016) ====
A secondary superkart class was contested eight times between 1989 and 2006. A single-cylinder category was re-introduced in 2016.

Year	European Champion	Chassis	Engine	Tyres	Runner-up	Third place	Class	Stroke
1989	(United Kingdom) Derek Rodgers						ICE	250cc
1990	(Finland) Johan Paujla						ICE	250cc
1991	(United Kingdom) Andy Martin						ICE	250cc
1992	(United Kingdom) Andy Martin (2)						ICE	250cc
1993	(United Kingdom) Nigel Puddiphat						ICE	250cc
1994 – 2002	No secondary superkart class contested							
2003	(United Kingdom) Andrew Agnew	Anderson	Rotax	B	(Czech Republic) Michal Bartak	(United Kingdom) Malcolm Crowe	SK-2	250cc
2004	(Germany) Michael Sadurski	PVP	Gas Gas	B	(United Kingdom) Gavin Bennett	(United Kingdom) Nathan Freke	SK-2	250cc
2005	No secondary superkart class contested							
2006	(Germany) Guido Kleinemeyer	PVP	Gas Gas	B	(Germany) Wolfgang Fritz	(Netherlands) Marcel Maasmann	SK-2	250cc
2007 – 2015	No secondary superkart class contested							
2016	(United Kingdom) Gavin Bennett	Anderson	DEA	D	(United Kingdom) Paul Platt	(United Kingdom) Donald Kennedy	SK-SC	250cc

== See also ==
- Karting World Championship
- Commission Internationale de Karting
- Fédération Internationale de l'Automobile
- Kart racing
- List of kart racing championships
- List of FIA championships
