= Australian Superkart Championship =

Australian motor racing series

- Category: Single-seaters
- Country: Australia
- Inaugural season: 1989
- Drivers: 72
- Teams: 33
- Constructors: 7
- Drivers' champion: Russell Jamieson
- Makes' champion: Anderson Racing Karts
- Teams' champion: Coach Design
- Official website: Superkarts Australia

The Australian Superkart Championship is a motor racing series run in Australia under the auspices of Motorsport Australia and AASA under their Superkart regulations. The karts race on full-size Australian circuits and in 2013 the series was raced at Sydney Motorsport Park and Phillip Island Grand Prix Circuit. As of 2007 the series has raced as part of the Shannons Nationals Motor Racing Championships. The series is one of nine that enjoy full CAMS Australian Championship status.

National titles have also been run by other sanctioning organisations over the years as one-off events.

== Classes ==
Presently three different classes of Superkart compete in the Australian championship: 250 International (for two cylinder 250cc engines), 250 National (for single cylinder 250cc engines), 125 Gearbox (for 125cc engines). Rotax max family of classes no longer compete for Australian championship status but have a single event non-gearbox Nationals with three classes: Rotax Light and Rotax Heavy, both weight based categories and Rotax Junior for drivers of the ages 12–16, and they run their Rotax 125cc engines without a power valve, reducing the power output of the class relative to Rotax Light and Rotax Heavy. While all classes compete for a national title, because of regulations in 2008 only the winners of the 250 International class has consistently been able to claim Australian Champion. Prior to the widespread popularity of Rotax Max the non-gearbox classes were 100cc engine capacity. Previously there was also a fourth gearbox class for 80cc engines Superkarts but numbers have dwindled in recent times to the point that 80cc class has been folded into 125cc class at national level and today only survives in limited numbers at state level.

== Champions ==
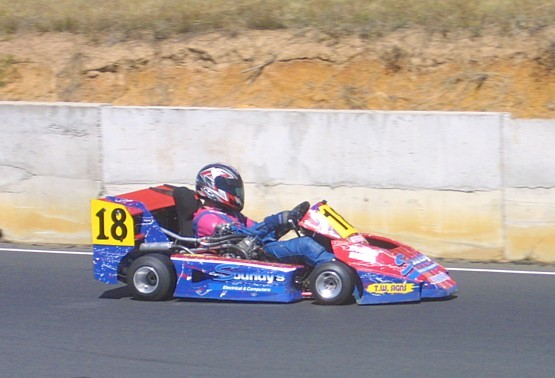
Australia's most decorated Superkart racer, Warren McIlveen

The following is a compilation of Australian Superkart championship and national series winners. Since 1980 superkart motor racing series have been run under AKA & CAMS regulation. Prior to 1989 titles existed run under AKA authority. Run originally as single event championship it blossomed into a multi-event series in the early 2000s.

One of the most successful driver in Superkart racing is Warren McIlveen who has won 7 titles, six of them in the top class, 250 International. The most successful & cross-class driver has been Brian Stockman who has won eight titles across four classes. 2 x 80cc, 1 x 125cc, 2 x 250cc single & 3 x 250cc international. Jason McIntyre, Luke May and Jeff Reed are the only drivers to have won both Gearbox and non-Gearbox titles. Both the non-gearbox classes 100cc and Rotax Max have both used Light, Heavy and Junior classes to further sub-divide their numbers on occasion. They are indicate L: Light, H: Heavy and J: Junior.

Due partially to falling numbers not all have been recognised as Australian Champions, some only as national series winners. For example, in 2009 only the 250 International class was recognised with the status of Australian champion. Numbers have since rebounded.

Attempts to run a Rotax Max title since 2009 had collapsed on multiple occasions but a replacement event no longer considered an Australian Championship was run in 2011.

| Year | 250cc International | | 250cc National | | 125cc Gearbox | | 80cc Gearbox | | 100cc non-Gearbox | | Rotax Max | |
| Year | Driver | Kart-Engine | Driver | Kart-Engine | Driver | Kart-Engine | Driver | Kart-Engine | Driver | Kart-Engine | Driver | Kart-Engine |
|---|---|---|---|---|---|---|---|---|---|---|---|---|
| 1989 | Paul Lawson | Zip | Barry Thomas | Zip | Bruce Jolly | Zip | Gerard Skelly | TonyKart | | | | |
| 1990 | Gerard Siebert | Zip Eagle-Rotax | Rob Lindsay | Anderson-Husqvarna | | | Glen Robertson | Eliminator-Yamaha | | | | |
| 1991 | Les May | Zip Eagle-Rotax | Rob Lindsay | Anderson-Husqvarna | Paul Hillman | Centreline-Honda | Cameron Kerr | Talbot-Yamaha | | | | |
| 1992 | Shane Wilson | Anderson-Rotax | Brian Stockman | Stockman-Kawasaki | Paul Hillman | Centreline-Honda | Chryss Jamieson | Gladiator-Yamaha | Dale Harris | Sprinter-Yamaha | | |
| 1993 | Gerard Siebert | Zip Eagle-Rotax | Brian Stockman | Stockman-Kawasaki | Paul Hillman | Centreline-Honda | Brett Anderson | Minarelli-Yamaha | Jeff Reed | Sprinter-Yamaha | | |
| 1994 | Les May | Anderson-Rotax | John Pellicano | Stockman-Kawasaki | Matthew Campbell | Centreline-Honda | Brett Walsh | Gladiator-Yamaha | Kerryn Brewer | Benson-Yamaha | | |
| 1995 | John Barabasz | Kustom-Rotax | Graeme Williams | Stockman-Yamaha | Peter Worrall | Centreline-Honda | Brett Walsh | Gladiator-Yamaha | Les Prziovski | Speed-Yamaha | | |
| 1996 | Gerard Siebert | Zip Eagle-Rotax | Paul Hillman | Centreline-Yamaha | Warren McIlveen | Stockman-Honda | Troy Byron | Centreline-Yamaha | Les Prziovski | Speed-Yamaha | | |
| 1997 | David Baker | PVP-Rotax | Chris Staff | Stockman-Kawasaki | Peter Worrall | Centreline-Honda | Troy Byron | Centreline-Yamaha | Ian Lennox | Mac-Mineralli | | |
| 1998 | Brian Stockman | Stockman-Yamaha | Michael Crossland | Stockman-Kawasaki | Peter Carter | Centreline-Honda | Ross Hansen | Centreline-Yamaha | L: Ray Collier; H: Ken Knight | Arrow AX5 | | |
| 1999 | Warren McIlveen | Stockman-Honda | Gary Brookes | Centreline-Honda | Brian Stockman | Stockman-Honda | Chryss Jamieson | Gladiator-Yamaha | L: Jason McIntyre; H: Gary Pegoraro; J: Luke May | DAP-Yamaha; CRG-Yamaha; CRG-Yamaha | | |
| 2000 | Brian Stockman | Stockman-Honda | Steven Tapper | Stockman-kawasaki | Roy Francescato | Centreline-Honda | Chryss Jamieson | Gladiator-Yamaha | L: Ray Collier; H: Gary Pegoraro | KCM-Yamaha; Azzurro-Yamaha | | |
| 2001 | Warren McIlveen | Stockman-Honda | Steven Tapper | Stockman-kawasaki | Darren Dunn | Topkart-Honda | Anthony Lappas | Eliminator-Yamaha | L: Michael Rogers; H: Andrew Davison | Arrow-Yamaha; KCM-Yamaha | | |
| 2002 | Sam Zavaglia | Stockman-Honda | Colin McIntyre | Anderson-KTM | Darren Dunn | Topkart-Honda | Ross Hansen | Centreline-Yamaha | Gary Pegoraro | Azzuro-Yamaha | Tracey O'Rourke | |
| 2003 | Warren McIlveen | Stockman MR2-Honda | | | Anthony Zulian | Stockman MR2-Honda | Chryss Jamieson | Gladiator-Honda | Gary Pegoraro | Azzuro-Yamaha | Shane Wright | |
| 2004 | Brian Stockman | Stockman MR2-Honda | | | Sam Zavaglia | Stockman MR2-Honda | | | | | Nathan Bey | Monaco CRG-Rotax |
| 2005 | Warren McIlveen | Stockman MR2-Honda | Jason McIntyre | Anderson-KTM | Sam Zavaglia | Stockman MR2-Honda | Doug Ward | Centreline-Yamaha | | | Darren Tyler | Birel-Rotax |
| 2006 | Warren McIlveen | Stockman MR2-Honda | Jason McIntyre | Anderson-KTM | Russell Jamieson | Stockman Laydown-Honda | Robert Trimmer | Centreline-Yamaha | | | | |
| 2007 | Warren McIlveen | Stockman MR2-Honda | Jason McIntyre* | Anderson-KTM | Kristian Stebbing | Stockman MR2-Honda | | | | | L: Michael Rogers; H: Ron Goldfinch; J: Sean Whitfield | |
| 2008 | Darren Hossack | Anderson-Safe | Martin Latta* | Stockman-Yamaha | Brad Stebbing | Stockman MR2-Honda | | | | | L: Michael Rogers; H: Mark Wicks; J: Sean Whitfield | Arrow-Rotax; Hypermax-Rotax; Hypermax-Rotax |
| 2009 | Sam Zavaglia | Stockman MR2-Yamaha | | | Steven Tamasi* | Stockman MR2-Honda | | | | | | |
| 2010 | Darren Hossack | Anderson-Safe | Martin Latta | Anderson-Honda | Steven Tamasi | Stockman MR2-Honda | | | | | | |
| 2011 | Warren McIlveen | Stockman MR2-Honda | Luke May* | Anderson-Honda | Jeff Reed | Stockman MR2-Honda | | | | | L: Shaun Pannowitch*; H: Steve Milner*; J: Tim Clarke* | |
| 2012 | Jason Smith | Anderson-DEA | Brendan Luneman* | Anderson-Yamaha | Jeff Reed | Stockman MR2-Honda | | | | | | |
| 2013 | Russell Jamieson | Anderson-DEA | Dalton Rowell* | Stockman MR2-Honda | Jeff Reed | Stockman MR2-Honda | | | | | | |
| 2014 | Gary Pegoraro | Anderson-BRC | Dalton Rowell* | Stockman MR2-Honda | Gary Haywood | Bakker X4-Yamaha | | | | | | |
| 2015 | Russell Jamieson | Anderson-DEA | Jordan Ford* | Anderson-Yamaha | Mark Robin | Stockman MR2-Honda | | | | | | |
| 2016 | Russell Jamieson | Anderson-DEA | Jordan Ford | Anderson-DEA | Lee Vella | Avoig | | | | | | |

* Indicates winner of a national series rather than Australian championship.
