= David McAdam =

English footballer

Personal information
- Full name: David Frederick McAdam
- Date of birth: 3 April 1923
- Place of birth: Hereford, England
- Date of death: 18 April 2017 (aged 94)
- Height: 1.76 m (5 ft 9 1/2 in)
- Position: Wing-half

Senior career*
Years	Team	Apps	(Gls)
- Stapenhill Working Men's Club
1948–1950	Leeds United	24	(0)
1950–1951	Wrexham	10	(0)
- Burton Albion
- Matlock Town
- * Club domestic league appearances and goals as of 01:34, 24 March 2018 (UTC)

David Frederick McAdam (3 April 1923 – 18 April 2017) was an English footballer who made appearances in the English Football League for Leeds United and Wrexham.

== Career ==
McAdam played for non-league Stapenhill Working Men's Club after being on the books of Aston Villa as an amateur.

He would be recruited by Leeds United manager Frank Buckley in 1948 as he strove to rebuild the team post-war.

McAdam would start strongly, playing 20 consecutive games for Leeds United before suffering a cartilage injury in a match against Blackburn Rovers on 29 January 1949 which ruled him out of the rest of the 1948–49 season.

However post-injury, he lost his first team place and moved to Wrexham in 1950, where he spent a season and made 10 appearances.

After Wrexham he would spend a total of 14 years in non-league football, spending a decade at Burton Albion and 4 years at Matlock Town.

== Death ==
McAdam died on 18 April 2017 at the age of 94 after years spent in a nursing home.
