= Matthew Wall =

Australian rules footballer

Personal information
- Full name: Matthew Wall
- Born: 5 March 1960 (age 66)
- Original team: Frankston YCW
- Height: 180 cm (5 ft 11 in)
- Weight: 75 kg (165 lb)
- Position: Wing

Playing career^{1}
Years	Club	Games (Goals)
1980–85	Richmond	60 (23)
- ^{1} Playing statistics correct to the end of 1985.

Matthew Wall (born 5 March 1960) is a former Australian rules footballer who played with Richmond in the Victorian Football League (VFL).

Days before his VFL debut in the opening round of the 1980 VFL season, Wall rolled his car, causing it to be a write-off, however was unhurt.
