= Jason MacIntyre =

Scottish cyclist

Personal information
- Full name: Jason MacIntyre
- Born: 20 September 1973 Lochgilphead, Argyll and Bute, Scotland
- Died: 15 January 2008 (aged 34)
- Height: 1.88 m (6 ft 2 in)

Cycling career
- Sport: Cycling
- Discipline: Road
- Role: Rider
- Rider type: Time Trial Specialist

Major wins
- British Circuit Race TT (2006); British 25-mile TT (2006); British 25-mile TT (2007)

Jason MacIntyre (20 September 1973 – 15 January 2008) was a Scottish racing cyclist. He was a triple British and Scottish champion time trial cyclist and broke Graeme Obree's 10-mile (16 km) time trial Scottish record in 2007. He was killed after a collision with a van on the A82 road.

== Early life ==
MacIntyre was born on 20 September 1973 in Lochgilphead, Argyll and Bute, Scotland. His family moved to Fort William when he was ten years old. He attended Lochaber High School, leaving in the sixth year and then he trained as a printer and lithographer.

== Cycling career ==
He started cycling at the relatively late age of 18. At the age of 22, he went to Lanzarote to train over the winter. The following year he won the 1997 Tour of the North in Northern Ireland at the age of 23. He then took a break from competitive cycling when he assumed the role of full-time carer for one of his twin daughters who was born with a kidney condition.

He represented Scotland at the 2002 Commonwealth Games in Manchester and competed in the final of the Men's Road Race although did not finish. He won the British National Time Trial Championships in 2006, the second Scot to achieve this. He won the British 25-mile time trial twice, in 2006 and 2007. Those years he also won the Scottish 25-mile time trial. He won thirteen Scottish titles.

In January 2008 the Braveheart Cycling Fund confirmed they would award him £2,000 towards racing expenses.

== Death ==
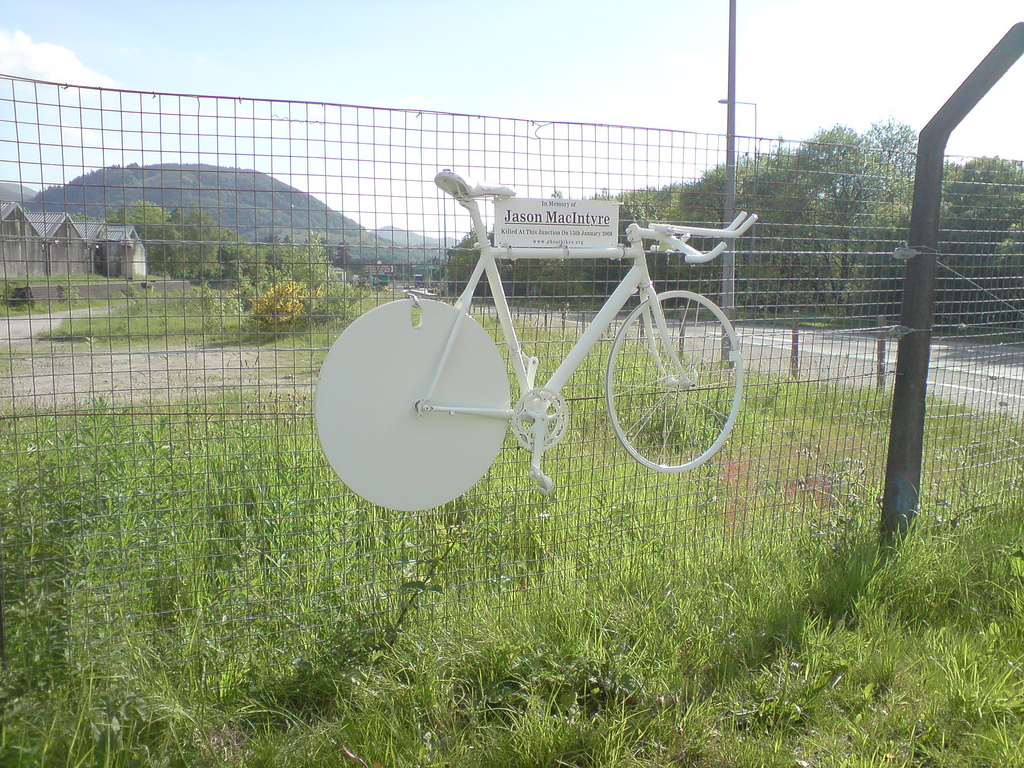
Ghost bike at Carrs Corner

On 15 January 2008, MacIntyre was on a training ride when a van turned across his path and he collided with it at Carrs Corner on the A82 road in Fort William. He was airlifted to hospital, but died of his injuries on the way. His corneas were donated for transplantation. His funeral was held on 23 January in Duncansburgh Parish Church.

MacIntyre was married and had twin daughters, who were eight years old at the time of his death. A memorial fund launched by the Braveheart Cycling Fund to provide assistance to MacIntyre's family raised £28,000 in less than a month. The fund aims to pay for a carer for one of his daughters, who has a serious kidney condition.

In March 2008, Robert MacTaggart, the driver of the council van that killed MacIntyre appeared at Fort William Sherriff court and pled guilty to the charge of careless driving. MacTaggart was fined £500 and had his driving licence suspended for six months.

On the first anniversary of his death, MacIntyre's family placed a ghost bike at Carrs Corner as a permanent memorial.

A fatal accident inquiry was held in March 2010.

== Career highlights ==
1997
1st General Classification P&O Irish Sea Tour of the North (GBR)
2000
1st Scottish G.P. overall (GBR)
1st Glasgow – Dunoon RR (British Premier Calendar) (GBR)
1st Scottish Hill Climb Championships, Bonnyton Moor (GBR)
1st Scottish Olympic ITT (GBR)
1st Scottish G.P. overall (GBR)
2004
1st Scottish Road Race Championship (GBR)
1st Scottish 4000M Pursuit (GBR)
2005
1st Scottish Olympic ITT (GBR)
2006
1st Scottish 10-mile ITT (GBR)
1st C.T.T. British 25-mile ITT (GBR)
1st Scottish Criterium Championship (GBR)
1st Scottish 25-mile ITT (GBR)
1st Scottish Olympic ITT (GBR)
1st British National Time Trial Championships (GBR)
1st Scottish Hill Climb Championships, Bonnyton Moor (GBR)
1st Scottish Road Race Championship (GBR)
2007
2nd British 10-mile ITT (GBR)
1st Scottish 10-mile ITT (GBR)
1st C.T.T. British 25-mile ITT (GBR)
1st Scottish 25-mile ITT (GBR)
1st Ian Wallis Memorial 10-mile ITT – 2007 New Scottish record (18:47) (GBR)
1st Scottish Olympic ITT (Eglinton) (GBR)
1st Tour of the Trossachs (Aberfoyle), New course record (1:04:47) (GBR)
1st Scottish Hill Climb Championships, Bonnyton Moor (GBR)
