= Stephen Castles =

Australian scholar (1944–2022)

Stephen Castles (1944–2022) was a major scholar of migration studies. He studied sociology at Goethe University Frankfurt, and completed postgraduate studies at the University of Sussex. Castles was Professor of Sociology and Director of the Centre for Multicultural Studies, a pioneering institution in its field, at the University of Wollongong between 1986 and 1996. He also headed the Centre of Asia Pacific Social Transformation Studies at the same institution before becoming the Director of the Refugee Studies Centre and subsequently founder of the International Migration Institute at the University of Oxford, where he also served as the Director of the Refugee Studies Centre, between 2001 and 2006. He subsequently taught at the University of Sydney (2009 to 2018). He was elected to the Academy of Social Sciences in Australia in 1997.

Castles' most famous work is the co-authored book The Age of Migration: International Population Movements in the Modern World, which has gone through multiple editions.
