= PVP Karting =

Danish company

PVP Karting is a Danish company which designs and constructs Superkart racing karts and engines, based in Slangerup, Frederikssund Municipality. The company was founded by Poul Vilhelm Petersen and has been building PVP Superkarts for over a decade. In addition to racing kart chassis, PVP also produces a 250cc two cylinder racing kart engine, a tandem cylinder design, similar to those built by Rotax, FPE and BRC. PVP karts have won national titles across Europe, Northern America and Australasia, with Damian Payart winning the European Championship in a FPE engined PVP kart in 2003 and 2004.
