= Superkart =

Racing series that uses karts on long circuits

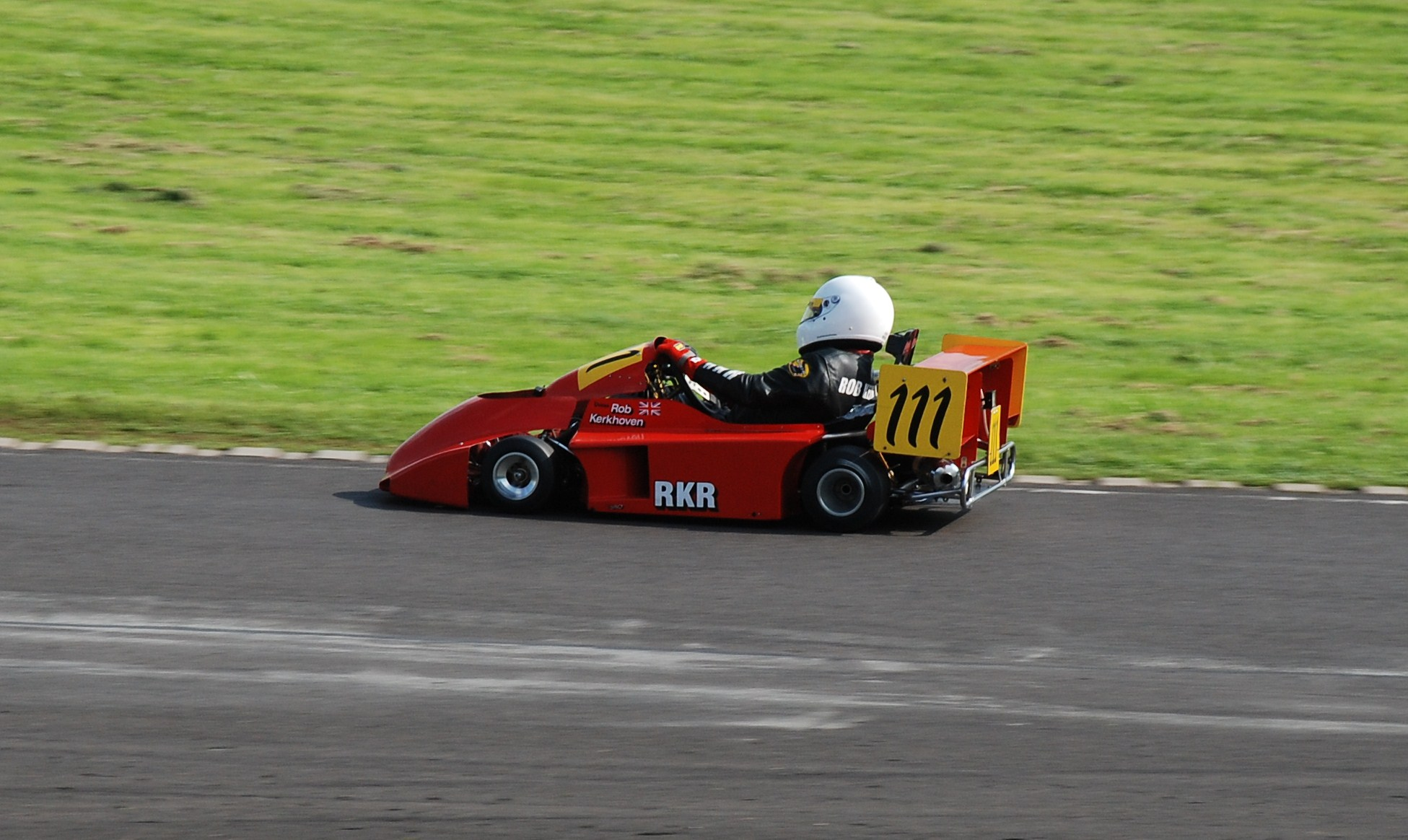
A Formula E/Division 250 cc superkart at Castle Combe, England

Superkart is a form of motorsport road racing that uses go-karts on long circuits. The main difference between a superkart and most other forms of kart racing is that they have full aerodynamic bodykits, as well as having a longer wheelbase than sprint chassis.

Superkarts typically have two-stroke specially-designed kart engines or production motorcycle engines. They are coupled with either five- or six-speed sequential manual gearboxes. The bodywork includes a front fairing, larger sidepods, and a rear wing. They use either 130-or-150-millimetre-diameter (5 or 6 in) tires and wheels.

Ssuperkarts with 250 cc (15 in^{3}) can reach a top speed of 250 km/h (155 mph) and set faster lap times than much more expensive and technically advanced racing machines. Some British and Australian classes also include 125 cc (7.6 in^{3}) gearbox karts.

Because of their superb straight line and cornering speeds, superkarts are generally raced on full-size auto racing circuits over 1,500 m (0.9 mi) in length, such as Silverstone, Laguna Seca and Magny-Cours. In the United Kingdom they also race on "short circuits" such as Kimbolton.

Superkarts are raced worldwide. There is a multi-event CIK-FIA European Superkart Championship (for 250 cc karts only), and there has in the past been a world championship, which was last run in 1995.

== Performance ==
Powered by a two-stroke 250 cc engine producing 75 kW (100 hp) for an overall weight including the driver of 205 kg (452 lb), superkarts have a power-to-weight ratio (including the driver) of approximately 365 W/kg (489 hp/t; 0.222 hp/lb), or closer to 730 W/kg (980 hp/t) without the driver, which is about the equivalent of a midget car, or an open-wheel A1 Grand Prix car. Superkarts can accelerate from 0 to 100 km/h (60 mph) in less than 3 seconds with a top speed of 250 km/h (155 mph). Their low weight and good downforce make for excellent cornering and braking abilities. A superkart is capable of braking from 160 km/h (100 mph) to standstill in around 2 seconds, and taking corners at nearly 3 g (30 m/s^{2} (98 ft/s^{2})).

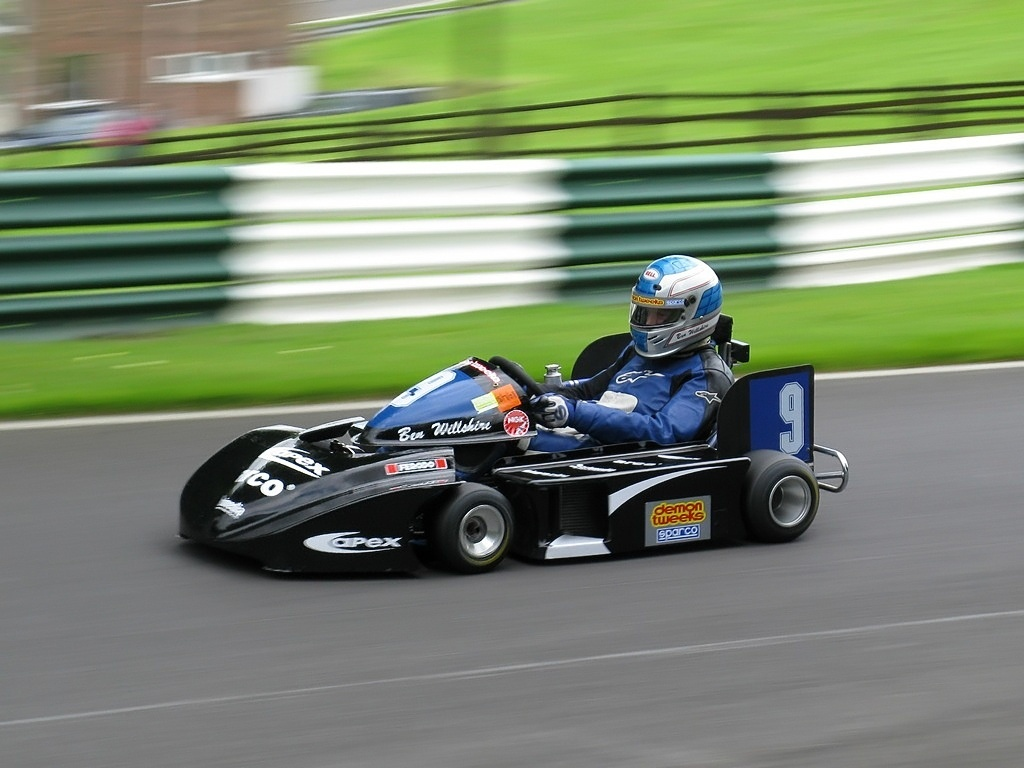
Ben Willshire British 125 Open Class superkart

British superkart divisions :

- Division 1 is open to 250 cc twin cylinder engines with five or six speed gearboxes. Typically the karts produce 71 kW (95 hp) and are capable of 230 km/h (140 mph) - the fastest form of kart. This formula was previously known as Formula E, which was changed to avoid confusion with the Formula E series.
- 250 National is for single cylinder karts with five- and six-speed boxes. Typically these karts produce 48 kW (65 hp) and are capable of 210 km/h (130 mph). However, being lighter than the twin cylinder (Division 1) karts they can be as quick on twisty circuits. This formula was previously known as 250 International.
- 125 Open - Powered by 125 cc (7.6 in^{3}) engines producing 34 kW (45 hp) and featuring six-speed sequential gearboxes, this class uses lighter chassis than the 250s and are the most agile of long circuit superkarts, they are capable of 190 km/h (120 mph).

Australian superkart divisions :

Superkart racing in Australia has, since 1989, referred to any form of racing kart to race on full-size motor racing circuits, usually as sanctioned by the Australian ASN, CAMS.

- 250 cc International - commonly referred to as twins or inters, these karts are powered by twin cylinder engines and usually have six-speed sequential gearboxes. Several European and North American chassis are popular in addition to locally developed designs.
- 250 cc National - single cylinder class, the 250 National class is powered by 250 cc motocross engines and also feature six-speed sequential gearboxes.
- 125 cc Gearbox - most often powered by 125 cc Honda and Yamaha Grand Prix motorcycle engines equipped with six-speed sequential gearboxes, this superkart class uses mostly the same chassis as the 250 classes. They run at lighter weights than the 250 classes, which makes for close racing with mid-field 250 Nationals at some circuits.
- 80 cc Gearbox - also dominated by Honda and Yamaha motor cycle engines, 80 cc Gearbox is no longer a sanctioned class in Australian racing. Some 80 cc (4.9 in^{3}) karts were noticeably smaller than 125/250 cc gearbox karts, with "laydown"-style karts, where the driver lies flat in the kart rather than sitting upright, proliferating. Last contested at the national level in 2005. and state level in 2008, some 80 cc karts survive racing in the 125 cc division at state level, but are uncompetitive as they no longer run at lighter homologated weight levels.
- 125 cc Rotax Max - a cross-over class from Australian short-circuit non-gearbox sprint kart racing to allow easier and cheaper graduation from sprint kart racing to long circuit racing. Three national championships exist for two weight divisions, Heavy, Light, and also sometimes a Junior division for drivers under the age of sixteen which run a version of the Rotax Max engine without a power valve. Rotax Max karts frequently race amongst gearbox-equipped superkarts at the state championship level, while racing for their own titles at the national level.
- 100 cc - another non-gearbox class, 100 cc (6.1 in^{3}) also was split into Heavy, Light and Junior classes, was last contested in 2002 and has since been replaced completely by Rotax Max.

United States superkart classes:

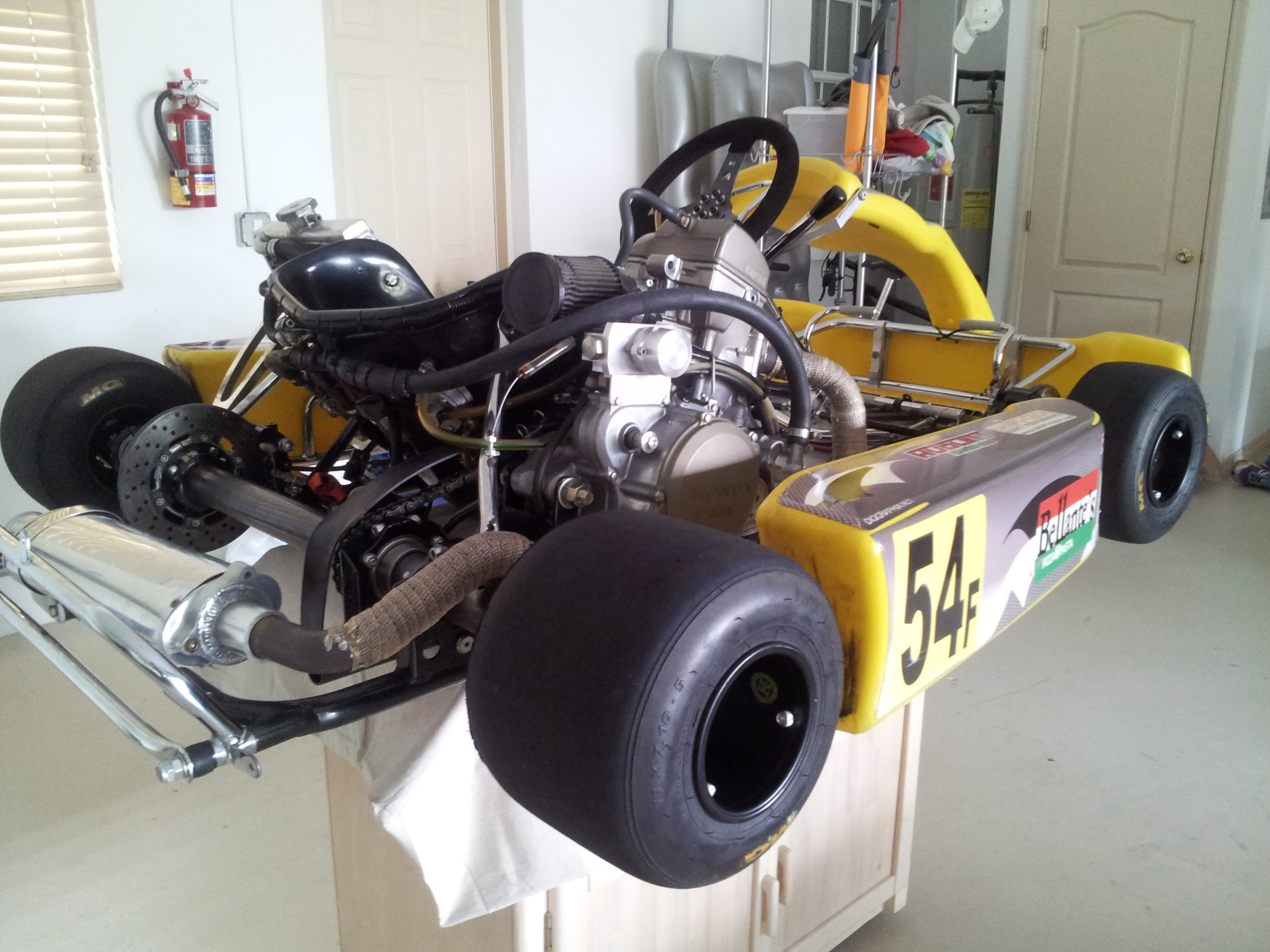
250cc Shifter Kart

- 250 cc Formula/E or F/E - Twin cylinder, six-speed, liquid cooled Grand Prix motorcycle engines such as the Honda RS250, Yamaha TZ250 or made for kart racing engines such as the BRC250.
- 250 cc Inter-Continental E or IC/E - Single cylinder, five- or six-speed, liquid cooled Grand Prix motorcycle engines.

== Spectacle ==
Road & Track reports that superkarts cost between $15,000 to US$20,000 in 2005. Entries of 60 or more are common in Britain. The relatively wide track and small size of the karts allow drivers to overtake more easily, resulting in races that are often closely contested. Race lengths tend to be around 20–25 miles (30–40 km), because the fuel tanks are quite small, so at most meetings that feature superkarts, the karts race is often a brief, spectacular highlight (U.S. superkart races are timed 30-minute races; pre-final on Saturday, final on Sunday).

A global category, superkarts are endorsed by the FIA, and were featured as a support category to the French Formula 1 Grand Prix at Magny-Cours in 2007 where they bettered Porsche Supercup lap times.

== See also ==
- Kart circuits
- KF1, the top level of karting
- KF2, a KF1 feeder series
- KF3, a KF2 and KF1 feeder series
- KZ1, the fastest KZ karting racing category
- KZ2, the second fastest KZ karting racing category
