= List of 2010 motorsport champions =

2010 motorsport champions
Previous: 2009	Next: 2011

This list of 2010 motorsport champions is a list of national or international auto racing series with championships decided by the points or positions earned by a driver from multiple races where the season was completed during the 2010 calendar year.

== Air racing ==
Series	Pilot	refer
Red Bull Air Race World Championship	(United Kingdom) Paul Bonhomme	2010 Red Bull Air Race World Championship

== Dirt oval racing ==
Series	Champion	Refer
Lucas Oil Late Model Dirt Series	(United States) Scott Bloomquist	
World of Outlaws Late Model Series	(United States) Josh Richards	
World of Outlaws Sprint Car Series	(United States) Jason Meyers	
World of Outlaws Sprint Car Series	Teams: (United States) Elite Racing	
Formula 500 Australia	(Australia) Ben McLeod	

== Drag racing ==
Series	Champion	Refer
NHRA Full Throttle Drag Racing Series	Top Fuel: (United States) Larry Dixon	2010 NHRA Full Throttle Drag Racing Series season
NHRA Full Throttle Drag Racing Series	Funny Car: (United States) John Force	2010 NHRA Full Throttle Drag Racing Series season
NHRA Full Throttle Drag Racing Series	Pro Stock: (United States) Greg Anderson	2010 NHRA Full Throttle Drag Racing Series season
NHRA Full Throttle Drag Racing Series	Pro Stock Motorcycle: (United States) L. E. Tonglet	2010 NHRA Full Throttle Drag Racing Series season
European Drag Racing Championship	Top Fuel: (Switzerland) Urs Erbacher	
European Drag Racing Championship	Top Methanol Dragster: (Germany) Timo Habermann	
European Drag Racing Championship	Top Methanol Funny Car: (Denmark) Dan Larsen	
European Drag Racing Championship	Pro Stock Car: (Sweden) Michael Malmgren	
European Drag Racing Championship	Pro Stock Modified: (Sweden) Johan Lindberg	

== Drifting ==
Series	Champion	Refer
British Drift Championship	(United Kingdom) Phil Morrison	2010 British Drift Championship
British Drift Championship	Semi-Pro: (United Kingdom) Ian Phillips	2010 British Drift Championship
D1 Grand Prix	(Japan) Youichi Imamura	2010 D1 Grand Prix series
D1 Grand Prix	D1SL: (Japan) Naoki Nakamura	2010 D1 Grand Prix series
D1NZ	(New Zealand) Gaz Whiter	2009–10 D1NZ season
Drift Allstars	(Republic of Ireland) Luke Fink	2010 Drift Allstars
European Drift Championship	(United Kingdom) Mark Luney	2010 European Drift Championship
Formula D	(United States) Vaughn Gittin Jr.	2010 Formula D season
Formula D Asia	(Malaysia) Tengku Djan Ley	2010 Formula D Asia season

== Karting ==
Series	Driver	refer
KF2
WSK Euro Series	(Italy) Ignazio D'Agosto	
CIK-FIA Karting European Championship	(Denmark) Nicolaj Møller Madsen	
Karting World Championship	(Netherlands) Nyck de Vries	
WSK Super Master Series	(Italy) Antonio Giovinazzi	
KF3
WSK Euro Series	(Netherlands) Max Verstappen	
CIK-FIA Karting European Championship	(Thailand) Alexander Albon	
Karting World Championship	(Thailand) Alexander Albon	
WSK Super Master Series	(Denmark) Nicklas Nielsen	
Superkart
European Superkart Championship	(United Kingdom) Gavin Bennett	
Australian Superkart Championship	250cc International: (Australia) Darren Hossack	2010 Australian Superkart season
Australian Superkart Championship	250cc National: (Australia) Martin Latta	2010 Australian Superkart season
Australian Superkart Championship	125cc Gearbox: (Australia) Steven Tamasi	2010 Australian Superkart season

== Motorcycle racing ==
Series	Rider	refer
MotoGP World Championship	(Spain) Jorge Lorenzo	2010 Grand Prix motorcycle racing season
Moto2 World Championship	(Spain) Toni Elías	2010 Grand Prix motorcycle racing season
125cc World Championship	(Spain) Marc Márquez	2010 Grand Prix motorcycle racing season
Superbike World Championship	(Italy) Max Biaggi	2010 Superbike World Championship season
Superbike World Championship	Manufacturers: (Italy) Aprilia	2010 Superbike World Championship season
Supersport World Championship	(Turkey) Kenan Sofuoğlu	2010 Supersport World Championship season
Supersport World Championship	Manufacturers: (Japan) Honda	2010 Supersport World Championship season
FIM Superstock 1000 Championship	(Italy) Ayrton Badovini	2010 FIM Superstock 1000 Championship season
FIM Superstock 1000 Championship	Manufacturers: (Germany) BMW	2010 FIM Superstock 1000 Championship season
European Superstock 600 Championship	(France) Jeremy Guarnoni	
Sidecar World Championship	(Finland) Pekka Päivärinta (Switzerland) Adolf Hanni	
Australian Superbike Championship	(Australia) Bryan Staring	

=== Speedway ===
Series	Champion	refer
Speedway World Championship	(Poland) Tomasz Gollob	2010 Speedway Grand Prix
Speedway Swedish Individual Championship	(Sweden) Andreas Jonsson	2010 Speedway Swedish Individual Championship
British Speedway Championship	(United Kingdom) Chris Harris	
Individual Speedway Danish Championship	(Denmark) Kenneth Bjerre	
Speedway World Cup	Poland national speedway team	2010 Speedway World Cup
Team Speedway Junior World Championship	Denmark national under-21 speedway team	2010 Team Speedway Junior World Championship
Australian Individual Speedway Championship	(Australia) Chris Holder	
Australian Under 16 Solo Speedway Championship	(Australia) Brady Kurtz	
Australian Under 21 Solo Speedway Championship	(Australia) Darcy Ward	
Australian Sidecar Speedway Championship	(Australia) Jason Aldridge (Australia) Cal Campbell	

== Open wheel racing ==
Series	Champion	refer
FIA Formula One World Championship	(Germany) Sebastian Vettel	2010 Formula One World Championship
FIA Formula One World Championship	Constructors: (Austria) Red Bull-Renault	2010 Formula One World Championship
GP2 Series	(Venezuela) Pastor Maldonado	2010 GP2 Series
GP2 Series	Teams: (Italy) Rapax	2010 GP2 Series
GP2 Asia Series	(Italy) Davide Valsecchi	2009–10 GP2 Asia Series
GP2 Asia Series	Teams: (United Kingdom) iSport International	2009–10 GP2 Asia Series
GP3 Series	(Mexico) Esteban Gutiérrez	2010 GP3 Series
GP3 Series	Teams: (France) ART Grand Prix	2010 GP3 Series
IndyCar Series	(United Kingdom) Dario Franchitti	2010 IndyCar Series season
IndyCar Series	Rookie: (United Kingdom) Alex Lloyd	2010 IndyCar Series season
Superleague Formula	(Belgium) R.S.C. Anderlecht (Davide Rigon)	2010 Superleague Formula season
FIA Formula Two Championship	(United Kingdom) Dean Stoneman	2010 FIA Formula Two Championship season
Firestone Indy Lights	(France) Jean-Karl Vernay	2010 Indy Lights season
Firestone Indy Lights	Teams: (United States) Sam Schmidt Motorsports	2010 Indy Lights season
Auto GP	(France) Romain Grosjean	2010 Auto GP season
Auto GP	Teams: (France) DAMS	2010 Auto GP season
Star Mazda Championship	(United States) Conor Daly	2010 Star Mazda Championship season
Formula Nippon	(Brazil) João Paulo de Oliveira	2010 Formula Nippon season
Formula Nippon	Teams: (Japan) Team Impul	2010 Formula Nippon season
Formula Palmer Audi	(United Kingdom) Nigel Moore	2010 Formula Palmer Audi season
ADAC Formel Masters	(New Zealand) Richie Stanaway	2010 ADAC Formel Masters
ADAC Formel Masters	Teams: (Germany) ma-con Motorsport	2010 ADAC Formel Masters
Formula Abarth	(France) Brandon Maïsano	2010 Formula Abarth season
Formula Abarth	Teams: (Italy) Prema Junior	2010 Formula Abarth season
Formula Abarth	Abarth Day: (Brazil) Nicolas Costa	2010 Formula Abarth season
BOSS GP Series	(Netherlands) Klaas Zwart	2010 BOSS GP Series
BOSS GP Series	Teams: (United Kingdom) Team Ascari	2010 BOSS GP Series
BOSS GP Series	Masters: (Germany) Karl Heinz Becker	2010 BOSS GP Series
EuroBOSS Series	(France) Damien Charveriat	2010 EuroBOSS Series
EuroBOSS Series	Teams: (Austria) Zele Racing	2010 EuroBOSS Series
Historic Formula One Championship	(United Kingdom) Peter Meyrick	2010 Historic Formula One Championship
Formula Challenge Japan	(Japan) Yuichi Nakayama	
Formula Future Fiat	(Brazil) Nicolas Costa	2010 Formula Future Fiat
Formula Volkswagen South Africa Championship	(South Africa) Simon Moss	2010 Formula Volkswagen South Africa Championship
Formula Volkswagen South Africa Championship	Teams: (South Africa) Bravo Racing	2010 Formula Volkswagen South Africa Championship
JAF Japan Formula 4	East: (Japan) Makoto Kanai	2010 JAF Japan Formula 4
JAF Japan Formula 4	West: (Japan) Naoki Nishimoto	2010 JAF Japan Formula 4
Formula Three
Formula 3 Euro Series	(Italy) Edoardo Mortara	2010 Formula 3 Euro Series season
Formula 3 Euro Series	Teams: (France) Signature	2010 Formula 3 Euro Series season
Formula 3 Euro Series	Rookie: (Portugal) António Félix da Costa	2010 Formula 3 Euro Series season
Formula 3 Euro Series	Nation: Italy	2010 Formula 3 Euro Series season
British Formula 3 Championship	(France) Jean-Éric Vergne	2010 British Formula 3 season
British Formula 3 Championship	National: (United Kingdom) Menasheh Idafar	2010 British Formula 3 season
Chilean Formula Three Championship	(Chile) Juan Carlos Carbonell	2010 Chilean Formula Three Championship
German Formula Three Championship	Cup: (France) Tom Dillmann	2010 German Formula Three season
German Formula Three Championship	Trophy: (Germany) Riccardo Brutschin	2010 German Formula Three season
German Formula Three Championship	Rookie: (Denmark) Kevin Magnussen	2010 German Formula Three season
German Formula Three Championship	AvD Speed: (France) Tom Dillmann	2010 German Formula Three season
Italian Formula Three Championship	Cup: (Brazil) César Ramos	2010 Italian Formula Three season
Italian Formula Three Championship	Teams: (Italy) Lucidi Motors	2010 Italian Formula Three season
Italian Formula Three Championship	Rookie: (United States) Gabriel Chaves	2010 Italian Formula Three season
All-Japan Formula Three Championship	(Japan) Yuji Kunimoto	2010 Japanese Formula 3 Championship
All-Japan Formula Three Championship	Teams: (Japan) TOM'S	2010 Japanese Formula 3 Championship
All-Japan Formula Three Championship	National: (Japan) Takashi Kobayashi	2010 Japanese Formula 3 Championship
European F3 Open Championship	Open: (Spain) Marco Barba	2010 European F3 Open season
European F3 Open Championship	Teams: (Lebanon) Cedars Motorsport	2010 European F3 Open season
European F3 Open Championship	Copa: (Lebanon) Noel Jammal	2010 European F3 Open season
Formula 3 Sudamericana	(Brazil) Bruno Andrade	2010 Formula 3 Sudamericana season
Formula 3 Sudamericana	Teams: (Brazil) Bassan Motorsport	2010 Formula 3 Sudamericana season
Formula 3 Sudamericana	Light: (Brazil) Fernando Rezende	2010 Formula 3 Sudamericana season
Australian Drivers' Championship	Gold Star: (United Kingdom) Ben Barker	2010 Australian Drivers' Championship
Australian Drivers' Championship	National: (Australia) Tom Tweedie	2010 Australian Drivers' Championship
Toyota Racing Series	(New Zealand) Mitch Evans	2010 Toyota Racing Series
Austria Formula 3 Cup	(Switzerland) Philippe Chuard	
Nordic F3 Masters	(Finland) Jani Tammi	2009 Nordic F3 Masters
Nordic F3 Masters	Teams: (Finland) Oakra F3	2009 Nordic F3 Masters
Formula Renault
Formula Renault 3.5 Series	(Russia) Mikhail Aleshin	2010 Formula Renault 3.5 Series season
Formula Renault 3.5 Series	Teams: (France) Tech 1 Racing	2010 Formula Renault 3.5 Series season
Eurocup Formula Renault 2.0	(Estonia) Kevin Korjus	2010 Eurocup Formula Renault 2.0 season
Eurocup Formula Renault 2.0	Teams: (France) Tech 1 Racing	2010 Eurocup Formula Renault 2.0 season
Formula Renault UK	C: (United Kingdom) Tom Blomqvist	2010 Formula Renault UK season
Formula Renault UK	Graduate: (United Kingdom) Alex Lynn	2010 Formula Renault UK season
Formula Renault UK	Entrants: (United Kingdom) Manor Competition	2010 Formula Renault UK season
Formula Renault UK	Winter Series: (United Kingdom) Alex Lynn	2010 Formula Renault UK season
Formula Renault BARC	(United Kingdom) Alice Powell	2010 Formula Renault BARC season
Formula Renault BARC	Teams: (United Kingdom) Hillspeed	2010 Formula Renault BARC season
Formula Renault Northern European Cup	(Belgium) Ludwig Ghidi	2010 Formula Renault 2.0 NEC season
Formula Renault Northern European Cup	Teams: (Netherlands) van Amersfoort Racing	2010 Formula Renault 2.0 NEC season
Formula Renault Northern European Cup	FR2000: (Denmark) Dear Schilling	2010 Formula Renault 2.0 NEC season
Formula Renault 2.0 Middle European Championship	(Switzerland) Zoël Amberg	2010 Formula Renault MEC season
Formula Renault 2.0 Middle European Championship	Teams: (Switzerland) Jenzer Motorsport	2010 Formula Renault MEC season
Italian Formula Renault Championship	(Italy) Francesco Frisone	2010 Italian Formula Renault season
Italian Formula Renault Championship	Teams: (Italy) Viola Formula Racing	2010 Italian Formula Renault season
Formula Renault 2.0 NEZ / Sweden	(Sweden) Daniel Roos	2010 Formula Renault 2.0 NEZ / Sweden season
Formula Renault 2.0 NEZ / Sweden	Teams: (Sweden) BS Motorsport	2010 Formula Renault 2.0 NEZ / Sweden season
Formula Renault 2.0 Finland	(Finland) Miika Kunranta	2010 Formula Renault 2.0 Finland season
Formula Renault 2.0 Argentina	(Argentina) Nicolás Trosset	2010 Formula Renault 2.0 Argentina
F4 Eurocup 1.6	(Belgium) Stoffel Vandoorne	2010 F4 Eurocup 1.6 season
V de V Challenge Monoplace	(France) Philippe Haezebrouck	2010 V de V Challenge Monoplace
Formula BMW
Formula BMW Europe	(Netherlands) Robin Frijns	2010 Formula BMW Europe season
Formula BMW Europe	Teams: (Germany) Josef Kaufmann Racing	2010 Formula BMW Europe season
Formula BMW Europe	Rookie: (Spain) Carlos Sainz Jr.	2010 Formula BMW Europe season
Formula BMW Pacific	(Singapore) Richard Bradley	2010 Formula BMW Pacific season
Formula BMW Pacific	Teams: (Philippines) Eurasia Motorsport	2010 Formula BMW Pacific season
Formula BMW Pacific	Rookie: (Singapore) Richard Bradley	2010 Formula BMW Pacific season
Formula Lista Junior	(United States) Michael Lamotte	2010 Formula Lista Junior season
Formula Lista Junior	Teams: (Switzerland) Daltec Racing	2010 Formula Lista Junior season
Formula Ford
British Formula Ford Championship	C: (Australia) Scott Pye	2010 British Formula Ford season
British Formula Ford Championship	S: (United Kingdom) Tristan Mingay	2010 British Formula Ford season
F2000 Championship Series	(Brazil) Victor Carbone	2010 F2000 Championship Series season
U.S. F2000 National Championship	(United States) Sage Karam	2010 U.S. F2000 National Championship
U.S. F2000 National Championship	Teams: (United States) Andretti Autosport	2010 U.S. F2000 National Championship
Australian Formula Ford Championship	(Australia) Chaz Mostert	2010 Australian Formula Ford Championship
Finnish Formula Ford Championship	(Finland) Antti Buri	
Finnish Formula Ford Championship	Zetec: (Finland) Markus Ollila	
Finnish Formula Ford Championship	Rookie: (Finland) Elmeri Ylitalo	
New Zealand Formula Ford Championship	(New Zealand) Martin Short	
Pacific F2000 Championship	(United States) Scott Rarick	2010 Pacific F2000 Championship
Scottish Formula Ford Championship	(United Kingdom) Craig Brunton	
Ontario Formula Ford Championship	(Canada) Dean Baker	2010 Ontario Formula Ford Championship

== Rallying ==
Series	Driver/Co-Driver	refer
World Rally Championship	(France) Sébastien Loeb (Monaco) Daniel Elena	2010 World Rally Championship season
World Rally Championship	Manufacturers: (France) Citroën	2010 World Rally Championship season
Intercontinental Rally Challenge	(Finland) Juho Hänninen (Finland) Mikko Markkula	2010 Intercontinental Rally Challenge season
Intercontinental Rally Challenge	Manufacturers: (Czech Republic) Škoda Auto	2010 Intercontinental Rally Challenge season
African Rally Championship	(Zimbabwe) James Whyte	2010 African Rally Championship
African Rally Championship	Co-Drivers: (Zimbabwe) Philip Archenoul	2010 African Rally Championship
Asia-Pacific Rally Championship	(Japan) Katsuhiko Taguchi (New Zealand) Glenn Macneall	2010 Asia-Pacific Rally Championship season
Asia-Pacific Rally Championship	Manufacturers: (Japan) Mitsubishi Motors	2010 Asia-Pacific Rally Championship season
Asia-Pacific Rally Championship	Asia Cup: (Japan) Yuya Sumiyama; Asia Cup: (Japan) Naoki Kase	2010 Asia-Pacific Rally Championship season
Asia-Pacific Rally Championship	Pacific Cup: (Australia) Brendan Reeves; Pacific Cup: (Australia) Rhianon Smyth	2010 Asia-Pacific Rally Championship season
Canadian Rally Championship	(Canada) Antoine L'Estage	2010 Canadian Rally Championship
Canadian Rally Championship	Co-Drivers: (Canada) Nathalie Richard	2010 Canadian Rally Championship
British Rally Championship	(Republic of Ireland) Keith Cronin (Republic of Ireland) Barry McNulty	2010 British Rally Championship season
Australian Rally Championship	(Australia) Simon Evans (Australia) Sue Evans	2010 Australian Rally Championship
Central European Zone Rally Championship	Class 2: (Poland) Michał Sołowow	2010 Central European Zone Rally Championship
Central European Zone Rally Championship	Production: (Poland) Kajetan Kajetanowicz	2010 Central European Zone Rally Championship
Central European Zone Rally Championship	2WD: (Poland) Michał Bebenek	2010 Central European Zone Rally Championship
Central European Zone Rally Championship	Historic: (Czech Republic) Miroslav Janota	2010 Central European Zone Rally Championship
Codasur South American Rally Championship	(Argentina) Raúl Martínez	
Czech Rally Championship	(Czech Republic) Pavel Valoušek	2010 Czech Rally Championship
Czech Rally Championship	Co-Drivers: (Czech Republic) Zdeněk Hrůza	2010 Czech Rally Championship
Deutsche Rallye Meisterschaft	(Germany) Matthias Kahle	
Estonian Rally Championship	(Estonia) Margus Remmak	2010 Estonian Rally Championship
Estonian Rally Championship	Co-Drivers: (Estonia) Urmas Roosimaa	2010 Estonian Rally Championship
European Rally Championship	(Italy) Luca Rossetti	2010 European Rally Championship
European Rally Championship	Co-Drivers: (Italy) Matteo Chiarcossi	2010 European Rally Championship
French Rally Championship	(France) Bryan Bouffier	
Hungarian Rally Championship	(Hungary) György Aschenbrenner	
Hungarian Rally Championship	Co-Drivers: (Hungary) Zsuzsa Pikó	
Indian National Rally Championship	(India) V. R. Naren Kumar	
Indian National Rally Championship	Co-Drivers: (India) D. Ram Kumar	
Italian Rally Championship	(Italy) Paolo Andreucci	
Italian Rally Championship	Co-Drivers: (Italy) Anna Andreussi	
Italian Rally Championship	Manufacturers: (France) Peugeot	
Middle East Rally Championship	(Qatar) Misfer Al Marri	
NACAM Rally Championship	(Peru) Nicolás Fuchs	
New Zealand Rally Championship	(New Zealand) Dean Sumner	2010 New Zealand Rally Championship
New Zealand Rally Championship	Co-Drivers: (New Zealand) Paul Fallon	2010 New Zealand Rally Championship
Polish Rally Championship	(Poland) Kajetan Kajetanowicz	
Rally America	(Canada) Antoine L'Estage	2010 Rally America season
Rally America	Co-Drivers: (Canada) Nathalie Richard	2010 Rally America season
Romanian Rally Championship	(Hungary) Gergő Szabó	
Scottish Rally Championship	(United Kingdom) David Bogie	2010 Scottish Rally Championship
Scottish Rally Championship	Co-Drivers: (United Kingdom) Kevin Rae	2010 Scottish Rally Championship
Slovak Rally Championship	(Slovakia) Jozef Béreš Jr.	
Slovak Rally Championship	Co-Drivers: (Slovakia) Róbert Müller	
South African National Rally Championship	(South Africa) Enzo Kuun	
South African National Rally Championship	Co-Drivers: (South Africa) Guy Hodgson	
South African National Rally Championship	Manufacturers: (Japan) Toyota	
Spanish Rally Championship	(Spain) Alberto Hevia	
Spanish Rally Championship	Co-Drivers: (Spain) Alberto Iglesias Pin	

=== Rallycross ===
Series	Driver	Season article
FIA European Rallycross Championship	Div 1: (Norway) Sverre Isachsen	
FIA European Rallycross Championship	Div 1A: (Russia) Timur Timerzyanov	
FIA European Rallycross Championship	Div 2: (Republic of Ireland) Derek Tohill	
British Rallycross Championship	(United Kingdom) Pat Doran	

== Sports car and GT ==
Series	Driver	refer
FIA GT1 World Championship	(Germany) Michael Bartels (Italy) Andrea Bertolini	2010 FIA GT1 World Championship season
FIA GT1 World Championship	Teams: (Germany) Vitaphone Racing	2010 FIA GT1 World Championship season
FIA GT3 European Championship	(Germany) Daniel Keilwitz (Germany) Christian Hohenadel	2010 FIA GT3 European Championship season
FIA GT3 European Championship	Teams: (Belgium) Prospeed Competition	2010 FIA GT3 European Championship season
American Le Mans Series	LMP: (Australia) David Brabham; LMP: (France) Simon Pagenaud	2010 American Le Mans Series season
American Le Mans Series	LMPC: (United States) Scott Tucker	2010 American Le Mans Series season
American Le Mans Series	GT: (Germany) Jörg Bergmeister; GT: (United States) Patrick Long	2010 American Le Mans Series season
American Le Mans Series	GTC: (Netherlands) Jeroen Bleekemolen; GTC: (United States) Tim Pappas	2010 American Le Mans Series season
Rolex Sports Car Series	DP: (United States) Scott Pruett; DP: (Mexico) Memo Rojas	2010 Rolex Sports Car Series season
Rolex Sports Car Series	GT: (United States) Emil Assentato; GT: (United States) Jeff Segal	2010 Rolex Sports Car Series season
Trans-Am Series	(United States) Tony Ave	
ADAC GT Masters	(Netherlands) Peter Kox (Germany) Albert von Thurn und Taxis	2010 ADAC GT Masters season
ADAC GT Masters	Teams: (Germany) Abt Sportsline	2010 ADAC GT Masters season
ADAC GT Masters	Amateurs: (Switzerland) Toni Seiler	2010 ADAC GT Masters season
Australian GT Championship	Championship: (Australia) David Wall	2010 Australian GT Championship season
Australian GT Championship	Challenge: (Australia) Shane Smollen	2010 Australian GT Championship season
Australian GT Championship	Production: (Australia) Paul Freestone	2010 Australian GT Championship season
British GT Championship	GT3: (United Kingdom) David Ashburn	2010 British GT Championship
British GT Championship	GT4: (United Kingdom) Christian Dick; GT4: (United Kingdom) Jamie Stanley	2010 British GT Championship
GT Brasil	GT3: (Brazil) Valdeno Brito; GT3: (Brazil) Matheus Stumpf	2010 GT Brasil season
GT Brasil	GT4: (Brazil) Valter Rossete	2010 GT Brasil season
Porsches
Porsche Supercup	(Germany) René Rast	2010 Porsche Supercup season
Porsche Supercup	Teams: (Austria) Al Faisal Lechner Racing	2010 Porsche Supercup season
Porsche Carrera Cup Germany	(France) Nicolas Armindo	
Porsche Carrera Cup Germany	Teams: (Germany) Hermes Attempto Racing	
Porsche Carrera Cup Great Britain	(United Kingdom) Tim Harvey	2010 Porsche Carrera Cup Great Britain
Porsche Carrera Cup Great Britain	Teams: (United Kingdom) Redline Racing	2010 Porsche Carrera Cup Great Britain
Porsche Carrera Cup France	(France) Frédéric Makowiecki	
Porsche Carrera Cup France	Teams: (France) Team Sofrev ASP	
Porsche Carrera Cup Scandinavia	(Sweden) Robin Rudholm	
Porsche Carrera Cup Scandinavia	Teams: (Sweden) IPS Motorsport	
Porsche Carrera Cup Japan	(Japan) Yasuhiro Shimizu	
Porsche Carrera Cup Asia	(Germany) Christian Menzel	
Porsche Carrera Cup Asia	Class B: (Singapore) Mok Weng Sun	
Australian Porsche GT3 Challenge	(Australia) Roger Lago	
Porsche GT3 Cup New Zealand	(New Zealand) Craig Baird	

== Stock car racing ==
Series	Driver	refer
NASCAR Sprint Cup Series	(United States) Jimmie Johnson	2010 NASCAR Sprint Cup Series
NASCAR Sprint Cup Series	Manufacturers: (United States) Chevrolet	2010 NASCAR Sprint Cup Series
NASCAR Nationwide Series	(United States) Brad Keselowski	2010 NASCAR Nationwide Series
NASCAR Nationwide Series	Manufacturers: (Japan) Toyota	2010 NASCAR Nationwide Series
NASCAR Camping World Truck Series	(United States) Todd Bodine	2010 NASCAR Camping World Truck Series
NASCAR Camping World Truck Series	Manufacturers: (Japan) Toyota	2010 NASCAR Camping World Truck Series
NASCAR Canadian Tire Series	(Canada) D. J. Kennington	2010 NASCAR Canadian Tire Series
NASCAR Canadian Tire Series	Manufacturers: (United States) Dodge	2010 NASCAR Canadian Tire Series
NASCAR K&N Pro Series East	(United States) Ryan Truex	2010 NASCAR K&N Pro Series East
NASCAR K&N Pro Series West	(United States) Eric Holmes	2010 NASCAR K&N Pro Series West
NASCAR Corona Series	(Mexico) Germán Quiroga	2010 NASCAR Corona Series
ARCA Racing Series	(United States) Patrick Sheltra	2010 ARCA Racing Series
Turismo Carretera	(Argentina) Agustín Canapino	2010 Turismo Carretera

== Touring car racing ==
Series	Driver	refer
World Touring Car Championship	(France) Yvan Muller	2010 World Touring Car Championship
World Touring Car Championship	Manufactures: (United States) Chevrolet	2010 World Touring Car Championship
World Touring Car Championship	Independent: (Spain) Sergio Hernández	2010 World Touring Car Championship
World Touring Car Championship	Independents Teams: (Italy) Scuderia Proteam Motorsport	2010 World Touring Car Championship
World Touring Car Championship	Rookie: (Hungary) Norbert Michelisz	2010 World Touring Car Championship
Deutsche Tourenwagen Masters	(United Kingdom) Paul di Resta	2010 Deutsche Tourenwagen Masters
Deutsche Tourenwagen Masters	Teams: (Germany) HWA Team I	2010 Deutsche Tourenwagen Masters
V8 Supercar Championship Series	(Australia) James Courtney	2010 V8 Supercar Championship Series
V8 Supercar Championship Series	Teams: (Australia) Triple Eight Race Engineering	2010 V8 Supercar Championship Series
V8 Supercar Championship Series	Manufacturers: (Australia) Holden	2010 V8 Supercar Championship Series
Fujitsu V8 Supercar Series	(Australia) Steve Owen	2010 Fujitsu V8 Supercar Series
British Touring Car Championship	(United Kingdom) Jason Plato	2010 British Touring Car Championship season
British Touring Car Championship	Independents: (United Kingdom) Tom Chilton	2010 British Touring Car Championship season
British Touring Car Championship	Manufacturers: (Japan) Honda	2010 British Touring Car Championship season
British Touring Car Championship	Teams: (United Kingdom) Honda Racing Team	2010 British Touring Car Championship season
British Touring Car Championship	Independents Teams: (United Kingdom) Arena Motorsport	2010 British Touring Car Championship season
New Zealand V8s	(New Zealand) Craig Baird	2009–10 New Zealand V8 season
ADAC Procar Series	D1: (Germany) Roland Hertner	2010 ADAC Procar Series season
ADAC Procar Series	D2: (Germany) Guido Thierfelder	2010 ADAC Procar Series season
ADAC Procar Series	D3: (Germany) Andreas Kast	2010 ADAC Procar Series season
Asian Touring Car Series	(Hong Kong) Charles Ng	2010 Asian Touring Car Series
Asian Touring Car Series	Teams: (Hong Kong) G.Harry Racing Team	2010 Asian Touring Car Series
Belgian Touring Car Series	(Belgium) Frédéric Bouvy	2010 Belgian Touring Car Series
Chevrolet Supercars Middle East Championship	SC09: (Bahrain) Fahad Al Musalam	2009–10 Chevrolet Supercars Middle East Championship
Chevrolet Supercars Middle East Championship	SC06: (Bahrain) Faisal Raffii	2009–10 Chevrolet Supercars Middle East Championship
Continental Tire Sports Car Challenge	GS: (United States) Charles Espenlaub; GS: (United States) Charles Putman	2010 Continental Tire Sports Car Challenge season
Continental Tire Sports Car Challenge	ST: (United States) Lawson Aschenbach; ST: (United States) David Thilenius	2010 Continental Tire Sports Car Challenge season
Danish Touringcar Championship	(Denmark) Casper Elgaard	2010 Danish Touringcar Championship
Danish Touringcar Championship	Teams: (Denmark) Team Telesikring	2010 Danish Touringcar Championship
SCCA Pro Racing World Challenge	GT: (United States) Randy Pobst	2010 SCCA Pro Racing World Challenge season
SCCA Pro Racing World Challenge	GTS: (United States) Peter Cunningham	2010 SCCA Pro Racing World Challenge season
SCCA Pro Racing World Challenge	TC: (United States) Robert Stout	2010 SCCA Pro Racing World Challenge season
Stock Car Brasil	(Brazil) Max Wilson	2010 Stock Car Brasil season
Stock Car Brasil	Teams: Eurofarma RC	2010 Stock Car Brasil season
TC2000 Championship	(Argentina) Norberto Fontana	2010 TC 2000 Championship
Eurocup Mégane Trophy	(Netherlands) Nick Catsburg	2010 Eurocup Mégane Trophy season
Eurocup Mégane Trophy	Teams: (France) TDS Racing	2010 Eurocup Mégane Trophy season
Volkswagen Scirocco R-Cup	(Germany) Kris Heidorn	2010 Volkswagen Scirocco R-Cup season
V8 Utes	(Australia) Grant Johnson	
Australian Sports Sedan Series	(Australia) James Sera	2010 Australian Sports Sedan season
Australian Production Car Championship	(Australia) Stuart Kostera	2010 Australian Manufacturers' Championship
Australian Saloon Car Series	(Australia) Tim Rowse	
Commodore Cup	(Australia) Adam Beechey	2010 Commodore Cup National Series
Mini Challenge
Mini Challenge Australia	(Australia) Chris Alajajian	
Mini Challenge New Zealand	(New Zealand) Matthew Hamilton	
Suzukis
Suzuki Swift Sport Cup New Zealand	(New Zealand) Will Bamber	
Fiat Linea
Trofeo Línea	(Brazil) Cacá Bueno	2010 Trofeo Linea Brasil season
SEAT León Supercopa
SEAT León Eurocup	(Hungary) Gábor Wéber	2010 SEAT León Eurocup season

== Truck racing ==
Series	Driver	Season article
European Truck Racing Championship	(Spain) Antonio Albacete	2010 European Truck Racing Championship
European Truck Racing Championship	Teams: (Germany) MKR Technology	2010 European Truck Racing Championship
Fórmula Truck	(Brazil) Roberval Andrade	2010 Fórmula Truck season
Fórmula Truck	Teams: (Brazil) RVR Corinthians Motorsport	2010 Fórmula Truck season
Fórmula Truck	Manufacturers: (Germany) Volkswagen	2010 Fórmula Truck season
V8 Ute Racing Series	(Australia) Grant Johnson	2010 Australian V8 Ute Racing Series

== See also ==
- List of motorsport championships
