= 2012 Kerrick Sports Sedan Series =

Australian motor racing series

The 2012 Kerrick Sports Sedan Series was an Australian motor racing competition for Group 3D Sports Sedans. The series commenced on 14 April at Mallala Motor Sport Park and concluded on 14 October at Wakefield Park after fifteen races. 2012 was the 28th year in which a national championship or national series for Sports Sedans had been contested in Australia.

Kerry Baily claimed his sixth Sports Sedan title after winning the first five races of the series and consistently finishing on the podium. Former champions Tony Ricciardello and Darren Hossack overcame a difficult first round, which saw both of them borrow another competitor's car, to finish second and third in the series.

== Teams and drivers ==
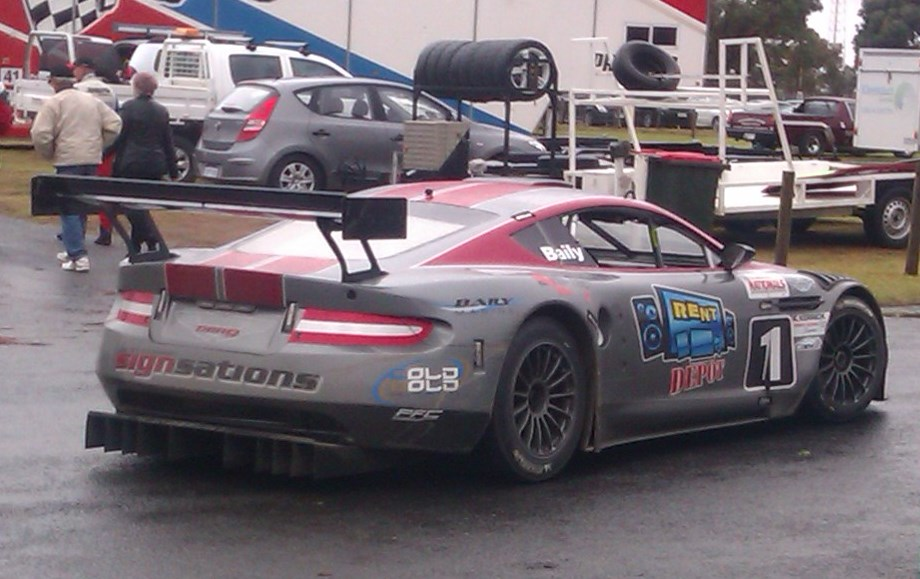
Kerry Baily won the 2012 Kerrick Sports Sedan Series in an Aston Martin DBR9 (pictured in 2013)

The following drivers competed in the 2012 Kerrick Sports Sedan Series.

| Driver | No | Entrant | Car |
|---|---|---|---|
| Tony Ricciardello | 1 | B&M Ricciardello Motors | Alfa Romeo Alfetta GTV |
| Darren Hossack | 4 | Auto Union Deutsche | Audi A4 |
| Robert Gill | 5 | Robert Gill | Ford BF Falcon |
| Jeff Barnes | 6 | Barnes High Performance | Pontiac Firebird |
| Ron Moller | 7 | Ron Moller | Chevrolet Camaro |
| Darren Hossack | 8 | Pfitzner Performance Gearbox | Ford EL Falcon |
| David Cameron | 8 | Subway | Holden Gemini |
| Daniel Tamasi | 9 | Domain Prestige Homes | Opel Calibra |
| Simon Copping | 11 | Industrie Clothing | Holden VZ Commodore |
| Chas Talbot | 12 | Pakenham Tyrepower | Chevrolet Corvette |
| Stuart Inwood | 12 | Blatch's Quality Smash Repairs | Ford AU Falcon |
| Anthony Cox | 14 | Rosemount Smash Repairs | Saab 9-3 Aero |
| Shane Ryding | 15 | Shane Ryding | Mazda RX-7 |
| Leigh Moran | 18 | Image Racing | Ford EL Falcon |
| Damien Johnson | 19 | Damien Johnson | Holden LJ Torana |
| Graeme Gilliland | 21 | P&L Mechanical | Mazda RX-7 |
| Phil Crompton | 21 | Datafin | Ford Mustang |
| Geoff Whittaker | 23 | Reds Racing Services | Holden VL Commodore |
| Scott Reed | 25 | Procut Racing | Ford Mustang |
| Birol Cetin | 27 | Billy's Automotive Services | Chevrolet Camaro |
| Michael Robinson | 32 | Bell Real Estate | Holden Monaro |
| Steven Lacey | 35 | Primo Smallgoods | Holden VK Commodore |
| Des Wall | 38 | Wall Contracting | Chevrolet Corvette GTS |
| Chris Donnelly | 43 | Aston Air Conditioning | Ford EB Falcon |
| Colin Smith | 44 | MR Automotive | Holden Monaro |
| Daniel Jameson | 45 | Campbelltown Frames & Trusses | Jaguar XKR |
| Dave McGinniss | 46 | Coaststeer Automotive | Opel Calibra |
| Mark Bowen | 46 | Interstate Finance & Leasing | Holden VK Commodore |
| Chris Jackson | 50 | Kumho Race Tyres | Holden Calibra |
| Geoff Russell | 50 | Aussie Wide Builders | Toyota Corolla |
| Tony Ricciardello | 51 | Marinelli's Mechanical | Holden VS Commodore |
| Bob McLoughlin | 51 | Marinelli's Mechanical | Holden VS Commodore |
| Bruce Banks | 56 | BJ Banks Electrical | Mazda RX-7 |
| Kerry Baily | 58 | Signstations/Baily Marine | Aston Martin DBR9 |
| Dean Camm | 66 | Fivestar Fencing & Gates | Chevrolet Corvette GTS |
| Andrew Leithhead | 67 | GTA Motorsport | Alfa Romeo Alfetta GTV6 |
| Shane Bradford | 68 | Aston Air Conditioning | Chevrolet Camaro |
| Scott Tutton | 71 | Tutton Plumbing | Mitsubishi Lancer RS Evo II |
| Alfred Axisa | 80 | Austrack Motorsport | Holden VZ Commodore |
| Charlie Senese | 81 | Charlie Senese | Chevrolet Corvette GTS |
| Anthony Macready | 97 | AGM Engineering | Nissan 300ZX |
| Jeff Brown | 98 | Wildridge Fabrications | Ford EF Falcon |

== Automobile eligibility ==
Each automobile competing in the series was required to comply with the provisions of one of the following classes:

- Class SS: Sports Sedans complying with the Group 3D Sports Sedans regulations as published in the CAMS Manual of Motor Sport
- Class TA: Trans-am cars complying with 2012 SCCA (Sports Car Club of America) Pro Racing Regulations

== Race calendar ==
The 2012 Kerrick Sports Sedan Series was contested over five rounds, each of which was held at Shannons Nationals Motor Racing Championships rounds.

| Rd. | Circuit | City / state | Date | Winner |
|---|---|---|---|---|
| 1 | (South Australia) Mallala Motor Sport Park | Adelaide, South Australia | 13–15 April | Kerry Baily |
| 2 | (Victoria (state)) Phillip Island Grand Prix Circuit | Phillip Island, Victoria | 25–27 May | Kerry Baily |
| 3 | (New South Wales) Sydney Motorsport Park | Sydney, New South Wales | 13–15 July | Tony Ricciardello |
| 4 | Queensland Raceway | Ipswich, Queensland | 10–12 August | Darren Hossack |
| 5 | (New South Wales) Wakefield Park | Goulburn, New South Wales | 12–14 October | Tony Ricciardello |

== Points system ==
The point score system was given a major overhaul in 2012. The emphasis on the three races which made up each round was changed, placing a sliding scale on race length and points value with the third race worth twice as many points as the first race with the second race splitting the difference.

| Position | 1st | 2nd | 3rd | 4th | 5th | 6th | 7th | 8th | 9th | 10th | 11th | 12th | 13th | 14th | 15th & below |
|---|---|---|---|---|---|---|---|---|---|---|---|---|---|---|---|
| Race 1 | 30 | 28 | 26 | 24 | 22 | 20 | 18 | 16 | 14 | 12 | 10 | 8 | 6 | 4 | 2 |
| Race 2 | 45 | 42 | 39 | 36 | 33 | 30 | 27 | 24 | 21 | 18 | 15 | 12 | 9 | 6 | 3 |
| Race 3 | 60 | 56 | 52 | 48 | 44 | 40 | 36 | 32 | 28 | 24 | 20 | 16 | 12 | 8 | 4 |

== Series standings ==
| Pos | Driver | Car | Round 1 – Mal | | | Round 2 – Phi | | | Round 3 – Eas | | | Round 4 – Que | | | Round 5 – Wak | | | Pts |
| Pos | Driver | Car | Race 1 | Race 2 | Race 3 | Race 1 | Race 2 | Race 3 | Race 1 | Race 2 | Race 3 | Race 1 | Race 2 | Race 3 | Race 1 | Race 2 | Race 3 | Pts |
|---|---|---|---|---|---|---|---|---|---|---|---|---|---|---|---|---|---|---|
| 1 | Kerry Baily | Aston Martin DBR9 | 1st | 1st | 1st | 1st | 1st | 2nd | 2nd | 3rd | 4th | Ret | 3rd | 3rd | 2nd | 3rd | 3rd | 591 |
| 2 | Tony Ricciardello | Holden Commodore; Alfa Romeo GTV | 4th | 3rd | Ret | 2nd | 2nd | 8th | 1st | 1st | 1st | 2nd | 2nd | 2nd | 1st | 1st | 1st | 561 |
| 3 | Darren Hossack | Ford Falcon EL; Audi A4 | 7th | 5th | 4th | Ret | 5th | 1st | 14th | 2nd | 2nd | 1st | 1st | 1st | Ret | 2nd | 2nd | 527 |
| 4 | Shane Bradford | Chevrolet Camaro | 3rd | Ret | 3rd | 4th | 3rd | 3rd | Ret | 6th | 5th | 3rd | 4th | 4th | 8th | 4th | 4th | 477 |
| 5 | Des Wall | Chevrolet Corvette GTS | 2nd | 2nd | 2nd | 3rd | Ret | 4th | 3rd | 4th | 3rd | | | | | | | 314 |
| 6 | Michael Robinson | Holden Monaro | 5th | 4th | 5th | 8th | 4th | 5th | 13th | 9th | 10th | 12th | 9th | 7th | | | | 314 |
| 7 | Dameon Jameson | Jaguar XKR | Ret | DNS | DNS | 7th | 7th | Ret | 4th | 7th | 7th | | | | 3rd | 5th | 5th | 235 |
| 8 | Bruce Banks | Mazda RX-7 | Ret | Ret | Ret | 9th | 6th | 6th | 18th | Ret | DNS | 9th | Ret | 11th | 4th | 6th | 6th | 214 |
| 9 | Colin Smith | Holden Monaro | 8th | Ret | Ret | 13th | 11th | 10th | Ret | 15th | 13th | 11th | 10th | 10th | 5th | 7th | 7th | 213 |
| 10 | Damian Johnson | Holden Torana | | | | 11th | 10th | 11th | | | | | | | 7th | 8th | 8th | 122 |
| 11 | Phil Crompton | Ford Mustang | | | | | | | | | | 4th | 5th | 5th | 6th | Ret | DNS | 121 |
| 12 | Daniel Tamasi | Holden Calibra | | | | 5th | DNS | Ret | Ret | 5th | 6th | | | | | | | 95 |
| 13 | Dean Camm | Chevrolet Corvette | Ret | DNS | DNS | 6th | 9th | 7th | 12th | 13th | Ret | | | | | | | 94 |
| 14 | Bob McLoughlin | Holden Commodore | DNS | DNS | DNS | | | | | | | 8th | 7th | 8th | | | | 75 |
| 15 | Mark Bowen | Holden Commodore VK | | | | | | | | | | 6th | 8th | 9th | | | | 72 |
| 16 | Geoffory Whittaker | Holden Commodore VL | | | | | | | 7th | 8th | 9th | | | | | | | 70 |
| 17 | Graham Gilliland | Mazda RX-7 | | | | 10th | 8th | 9th | | | | | | | | | | 64 |
| 18 | Jeff Barnes | Pontiac | DNS | DNS | DNS | | | | Ret | DNS | DNS | 5th | Ret | 6th | | | | 62 |
| 19 | Anthony Macready | Nissan 300ZX | | | | | | | 9th | 14th | 8th | | | | | | | 52 |
| 20 | Charlie Senese | Chevrolet Corvette | 6th | 6th | DNS | | | | | | | | | | | | | 50 |
| 21 | Anthony Cox | Saab | | | | | | | | | | 7th | 6th | DNS | Ret | DNS | DNS | 48 |
| 22 | Simon Copping | Holden Commodore | | | | | | | 11th | 10th | 14th | | | | | | | 36 |
| 23 | David McGinniss | Holden Calibra | | | | | | | Ret | 12th | 11th | | | | | | | 32 |
| 24 | Birol Cetin | Chevrolet Camaro | | | | | | | 5th | Ret | DNS | | | | | | | 22 |
| 25 | Geoff Russell | Toyota Corolla | | | | | | | | | | 13th | 11th | DNS | | | | 21 |
| 26 | Leigh Moran | Ford Falcon EL | | | | 12th | 12th | Ret | | | | | | | | | | 20 |
| 27 | Shane Ryding | Mazda RX-7 | | | | 14th | Ret | 12th | | | | | | | | | | 20 |
| 28 | Scott Reed | Ford Mustang | | | | | | | 8th | Ret | DNS | | | | | | | 16 |
| 29 | Chris Donnelly | Ford Falcon EB | | | | | | | 15th | Ret | Ret | 10th | Ret | DNS | | | | 14 |
| 30 | Chas Talbot | Chevrolet Corvette C5 | | | | Ret | 13th | Ret | | | | | | | | | | 9 |
| 31 | Ron Moller | Chevrolet Camaro | | | | | | | 16th | 16th | 15th | | | | | | | 9 |
| 32 | Steven Lacey | Holden Commodore VK | | | | | | | 17th | 18th | 16th | | | | | | | 9 |
| 33 | David Cameron | Holden Gemini | | | | | | | 19th | 19th | 17th | | | | | | | 9 |
| 34 | Jeff Brown | Ford Falcon | | | | | | | Ret | 17th | Ret | | | | | | | 3 |
| | Alfred Axisa | Holden Commodore VZ | | | | | | | Ret | Ret | DNS | | | | | | | 0 |
| | Bob Gill | Ford Falcon BF | | | | Ret | DNS | DNS | | | | | | | | | | 0 |
| | Scott Tutton | Mitsubishi Lancer Evo 2 | | | | | | | Ret | DNS | DNS | | | | | | | 0 |
Guest drivers
| | Chris Jackson | Holden Calibra | | | | | | | 6th | Ret | DNS | | | | | | | 0 |
| | Stuart Inwood | Ford Falcon AU | | | | | | | 10th | 11th | 12th | | | | | | | 0 |
| | Andrew Leithhead | Alfa Romeo Alfetta GT | | | | | | | Ret | DNS | DNS | | | | | | | 0 |

| Colour | Result |
|---|---|
| Gold | Winner |
| Silver | Second place |
| Bronze | Third place |
| Green | Points classification |
| Blue | Non-points classification |
| Blue | Non-classified finish (NC) |
| Purple | Retired, not classified (Ret) |
| Red | Did not qualify (DNQ) |
| Red | Did not pre-qualify (DNPQ) |
| Black | Disqualified (DSQ) |
| White | Did not start (DNS) |
| White | Withdrew (WD) |
| White | Race cancelled (C) |
| Blank | Did not practice (DNP) |
| Blank | Did not arrive (DNA) |
| Blank | Excluded (EX) |
