= 2008 Australian Sports Sedan Series =

Motor racing competition

The 2008 Kerrick Sports Sedan series was the 18th running of a national series for Sports Sedans in Australia. It began on 17 May 2008 at Mallala Motor Sport Park and ended on 30 November at Sandown Raceway after fifteen races.

The series was won by Darren Hossack. The battle between Hossack, driving the John Gourlay owned and still under development new Audi A4 and Tony Ricciardello and his family run team with their well sorted and multiple-championship winning Alfa Romeo GTV would go down to the final race of the series, with Hossack winning the race and the title. For Hossack it was the rare achievement of winning two Australian motor racing series in the same calendar year having previously won the 2008 Australian Superkart Championship.

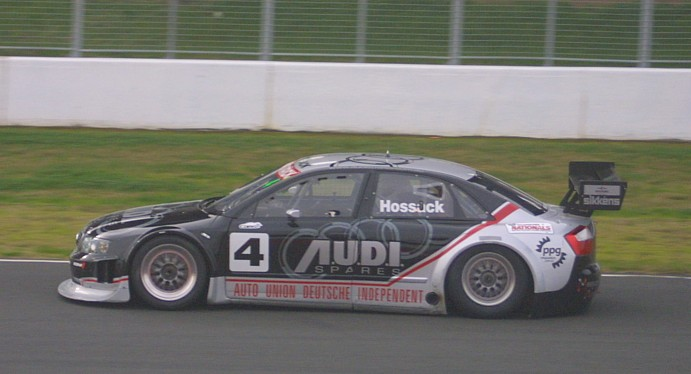
Series winner, Darren Hossack (Audi A4-Chevrolet)

== Eligible automobiles ==
The following automobiles were eligible to compete in the series:

- Sports Sedans complying with CAMS Group 3D regulations
- Transam Cars complying with ASSC regulations for North American Transam competition
- TraNZam cars complying with TRG of New Zealand regulations

== Teams and drivers ==
The following drivers competed in the 2008 Kerrick Sports Sedan Series.

Team	Car	No	Driver
B&M Ricciardello	Alfa Romeo GTV	1	Tony Ricciardello
Audi Spares	Audi A4	4	Darren Hossack
Flamecrusher	Jaguar XKR	5	Bernie Gillon
Prahrans Fastest Plumber	Ford BF Falcon	5	Bob Gill
Barnes High Performance	Pontiac Firebird Trans Am	6	Jeff Barnes
Simon Longhurst Racing	Mazda RX-7	7	Simon Longhurst
Domain Prestige Homes	Holden Calibra	9	Daniel Tamasi
Alvee Products	Saab 9-3 Aero	14	Mark Nelson
Alvee Products	Saab 9-3 Aero	14	Shane Price
QLD Commercial Constructions	Honda Prelude	15	Charlie Senese
Rockley Contracting	Opel Calibra	16	Graham Smith
Kings Fibreglass/Harrop Engineering	Holden LJ Torana	19	Damian Johnson
Lifetime Financial	Ford Mustang	21	Phil Crompton
Menai Blinds/Steves Toy Shop	Chevrolet Camaro	26	Scott Butler
Airey Industrial	Nissan 300ZX	28	Kerry Baily
NMR Motorsport	Chevrolet Camaro	30	Geoff Munday
Sonata Lounge Furniture	Ford Mustang	31	Luke Youlden
Bell Real Estate	Holden Monaro	32	Michael Robinson
Mt Aqua Spring Water	Chevrolet Corvette GTS	38	Des Wall
Harmony	Ford AU Falcon	39	Chris Smerdon
RK&T Young Plumbing	Mazda RX-7	41	Trent Young
Aston Air Conditioning	Ford EB Falcon	43	Shane Bradford
MR Automotive	Rover Vitesse	44	Colin Smith
Campbelltown Frames & Trusses	Jaguar XKR	45	Daniel Jameson
Coaststeer Auto Services	Holden Calibra	46	David McGinniss
Fuel 2 Race/Steves Toy Shop	Holden Calibra	50	Chris Jackson
Marinelli's Mechanical & Performance	Holden VS Commodore	51	Bob McLoughlin
BJ Banks Electrical	Mazda RX-7	56	Bruce Banks
Quality Concreting	Mazda RX-7	59	Bobby Irvin
Fivestar Fencing/Darred Panels	Chevrolet Corvette GTS	66	Dean Camm
Simons Builders Gypsum Australia	Ford Cortina	77	Glen Hastings
Austrack Motorsport	Holden VX Commodore	80	Fred Axisa
Esjay Commercial Plastering	Holden VS Commodore	88c	Ian Rice
Bohler Uddeholm Australia	Nissan 300ZX	97	Anthony Macready
Wildridge Fabrications	Ford EF Falcon	98	Jeff Brown
Steve Ingwersen Painting	Holden VS Commodore	115	Steve Ingwersen
JCV Automotive Katoomba	Ford AU Falcon	261	John Vergotis

== Race calendar ==
The 2008 Kerrick Sports Sedan Series was contested over five rounds in three different Australian states with each round contested over three races.

Rd.	Circuit	Location / state	Date	Winner
1	Mallala Motor Sport Park	Mallala, South Australia	17–18 May	Luke Youlden
2	Phillip Island Grand Prix Circuit	Phillip Island, Victoria	14–15 Jun	Darren Hossack
3	Eastern Creek Raceway	Sydney, New South Wales	12–13 Jul	Darren Hossack
4	Oran Park Raceway	Sydney, New South Wales	30–31 Aug	Tony Ricciardello
5	Sandown Raceway	Melbourne, Victoria	29–30 Nov	Tony Ricciardello

== Points system ==
Points were awarded 20–17–15–13–12–11–10–9–8–7–6–5–4–3–2 based on the top fifteen positions in each race with all other classified finishers awarded 1 point. There were two bonus points allocated for first position in Qualifying at each round.

To be eligible to score points, competitors were required to register with the series manager.

== Series standings ==
Pos	Driver	Round 1 – Mal			Round 2 – Phi			Round 3 – Eas			Round 4 – Ora			Round 5 – San			Pts
Pos	Driver	Race 1	Race 2	Race 3	Race 1	Race 2	Race 3	Race 1	Race 2	Race 3	Race 1	Race 2	Race 3	Race 1	Race 2	Race 3	Pts
1	Darren Hossack	DNS	2nd	2nd	**1st**	4th	1st	**1st**	1st	1st	**2nd**	1st	Ret	2nd	2nd	1st	244
2	Tony Ricciardello	DNS	Ret	1st	2nd	1st	2nd	2nd	2nd	2nd	1st	2nd	1st	**1st**	1st	4th	237
3	Kerry Baily	**2nd**	3rd	4th	11th	Ret	DNS	4th	6th	5th	DNS	4th	2nd	4th	4th	3rd	160
4	Trent Young	4th	4th	6th	5th	Ret	DNS	7th	5th	4th	4th	Ret	4th	6th	6th	6th	146
5	Luke Youlden	1st	1st	3rd	3rd	2nd	3rd										102
6	Dean Camm				6th	Ret	9th	11th	Ret	8th	7th	13th	9th	7th	7th	7th	90
7	Charlie Senese	5th	7th	Ret	10th	5th	5th	13th	DNS	13th	DNS	12th	Ret				68
8	Daniel Tamasi	DNS	6th	5th	DNS	DNS	DNS	5th	4th	Ret	Ret	8th	7th	Ret	DNS	DNS	67
9	Phil Crompton	3rd	5th	7th	Ret	3rd	4th	Ret	Ret	Ret	DNS	DNS	DNS				65
9	Scott Butler							8th	7th	10th	6th	3rd	5th				65
11	Mark Nelson				7th	8th	8th	Ret	10th	9th	8th	7th	Ret				63
12	David McGinniss				Ret	6th	6th	9th	Ret	Ret	DNS	10th	6th				48
13	Bruce Banks	6th	Ret	9th	9th	Ret	Ret							8th	8th	Ret	47
13	Shane Price													3rd	3rd	2nd	47
15	Ian Rice				4th	7th	7th										33
15	Bob McLoughlin	Ret	8th	8th							9th	11th	8th				33
17	Chris Jackson							6th	8th	6th	Ret	DNS	DNS				31
18	Colin Smith							14th	11th	11th	10th	14th	DNS				27
18	Daniel Jameson							Ret	DNS	Ret	3rd	5th	Ret				27
18	Damian Johnson													9th	9th	9th	27
21	Jeff Barnes										DNS	6th	3rd				26
22	Anthony Macready							10th	9th	12th				DNS	DNS	DNS	21
23	Bobby Irvin							DNS	DNS	DNS	5th	9th	Ret				20
24	Geoff Munday				8th	DNS	DNS							Ret	DNS	8th	19
25	Michael Robinson										DNS	16th	10th				8
25	Jeff Brown										11th	15th	DNS				8
27	Bob Gill										DNS	17th	DNS				1
	Bernie Gillon							3rd	3rd	3rd							
	Simon Longhurst	Ret	Ret	Ret													
	Fred Axisa										DNS	Ret	Ret				
	Des Wall	DNS	DNS	DNS													
	Shane Bradford							DNS	DNS	DNS							
	Graham Smith										DNS	DNS	DNS				
	Glen Hastings													DNS	DNS	DNS	

Colour	Result
Gold	Winner
Silver	Second place
Bronze	Third place
Green	Points classification
Blue	Non-points classification
Blue	Non-classified finish (NC)
Purple	Retired, not classified (Ret)
Red	Did not qualify (DNQ)
Red	Did not pre-qualify (DNPQ)
Black	Disqualified (DSQ)
White	Did not start (DNS)
White	Withdrew (WD)
White	Race cancelled (C)
Blank	Did not practice (DNP)
Blank	Did not arrive (DNA)
Blank	Excluded (EX)

Note: First position in Qualifying at each round is shown in bold in the above table.
