= 2009 Kerrick Sports Sedan Series =

Motor racing competition

The 2009 Kerrick Sports Sedan Series was an Australian motor sport competition which began on 25 April 2009 at Wakefield Park and ended on 22 November at Phillip Island Grand Prix Circuit after five rounds and fifteen races. The series was open to Group 3D Sports Sedans, Tran-Am automobiles and New Zealand TraNZam automobiles. It marked the 19th running of a national series for Sports Sedans in Australia.

Chevrolet Corvette driver Des Wall won the series after a fierce contest between the top three competitors. Winners of the previous two series, Tony Ricciardello (Alfa Romeo Alfetta) and Darren Hossack (Audi A4), competed initially for the race wins, but mechanical unreliability and on-track confrontations, usually with each other, allowed Wall to close the gap. Wall only won three races (compared to Ricciardello's six and Hossack's five) but was only out of the top five race positions once all season with an eighth-placed finish at Oran Park. Ricciardello and Hossack each failed to finish two races during the series. Wall, who has been a Sports Sedan front runner since 1989, claimed his first series win with a twelve-point victory over Ricciardello. Hossack was third, nine points behind Ricciardello.

The only other driver to score a race win was Opel Calibra driver Chris Jackson at Oran Park and he finished fifth in the points chase behind series veteran Kerry Baily (Nissan 300ZX).

== Teams and drivers ==
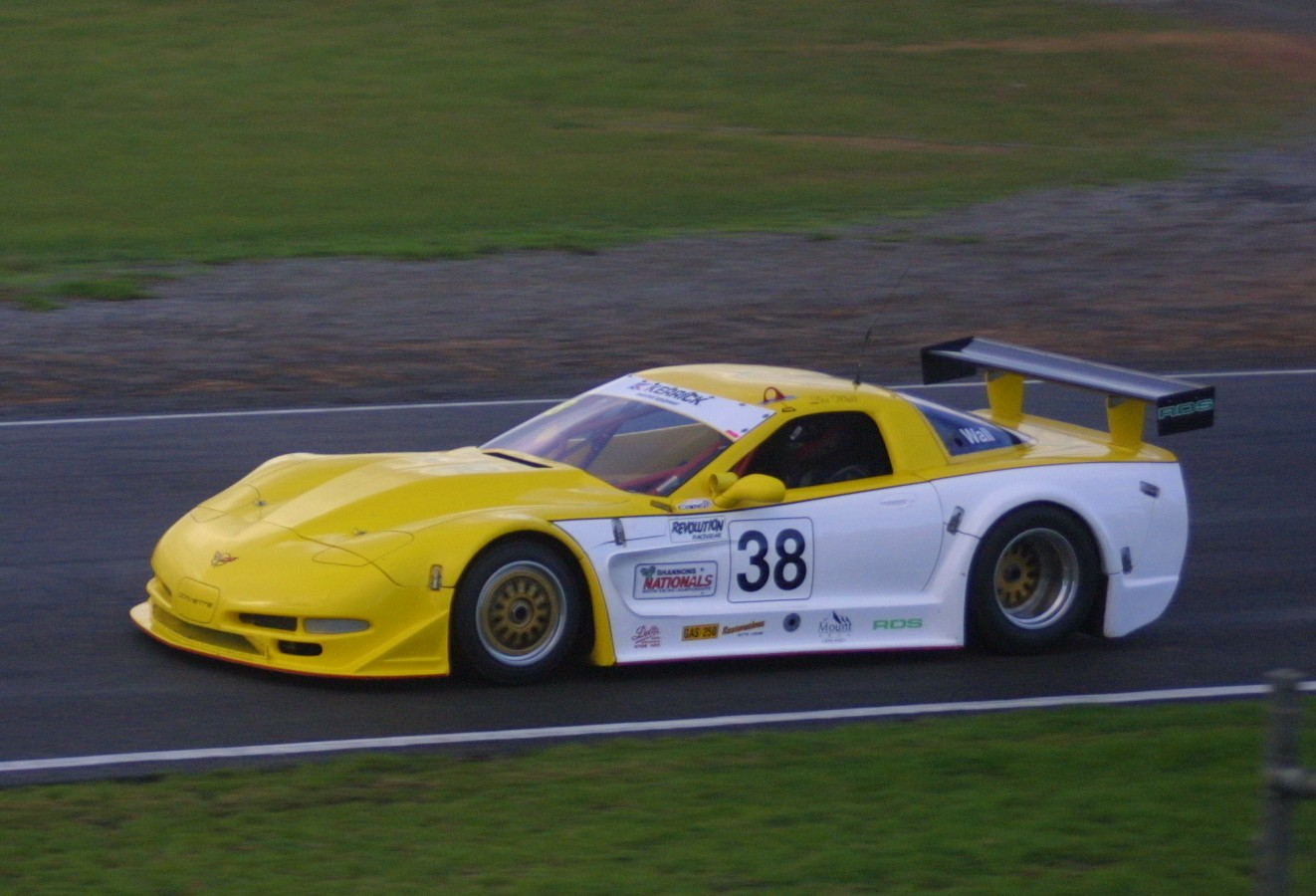
2009 Kerrick Sports Sedan Series winner, Des Wall (Chevrolet Corvette)

The following drivers competed in the 2009 Kerrick Sports Sedan Series. The series consisted of fifteen races, at five race meetings, held in three states.

Entrant	Car	No	Driver
Audi Spares	Audi A4	1	Darren Hossack
Independent Motorsports	Toyota Corolla	3	Nicholas Cambridge
B&M Ricciardello	Alfa Romeo Alfetta GTV	5	Tony Ricciardello
Barnes High Performance	Pontiac Firebird	6	Jeff Barnes
Robin O'Hare	Holden LX Torana	7	Robin O'Hare
Wayne Purdon	Holden LH Torana	7	Wayne Purdon
Pfitzner Performance Cars	Ford EF Falcon	8	Ian Wilson
Domain Prestige Homes	Holden Calibra	9	Daniel Tamasi
Centreline Suspension	Ford Escort MkI	10	Ken House
Fuel 2 Race/Steve's Toy Shop	Holden Calibra	11	Chris Jackson
repcoservice.com	Mazda RX-7	11	Laurie Williams
Pakenham Tyrepower	Holden VN Commodore	12	Chas Talbot
Alvee Products	Saab 9-3 Aero	14	Mark Nelson
Steven's Security Group	Mazda RX-7	15	Garry Stevens
Rocklea Contracting	Holden Calibra	16	Graham Smith
Coxys Motorsport Spares	Ford XA Falcon	17	Paddy Matchet
P&L Mechanical	Mazda RX-7	18	Graeme Gilliland
Decoglaze	Ford XD Falcon	18	Kerry Millar
Harrop/Kings Fibreglass	Holden LJ Torana	19	Damian Johnson
Tony Long Fibreglass/VG Auto Paint	Fiat 124 Coupe	19	Joe Said
P&L Mechanical	Mazda RX-7	21	Graeme Gilliland
Lifetime Financial	Ford Mustang	21	Phil Crompton
Glenn Pro	Ford Escort RS2000	21	Glenn Pro
Swimart Baulkham Hills	Ford Escort	22	Darren Steeden
Norm Stokes Transport	Mazda RX-7	24	Norm Stokes
Jocaro Motors	Holden Calibra	25	Neil Bryson
Brandster Serv Motorsport	Nissan Skyline GT-R R32	25	Dave Loftus
Steve's Toy Shop/Menai Blinds	Chevrolet Camaro	26	Scott Butler
Airey Industrial	Nissan 300ZX	28	Kerry Baily
NMR Motorsport	Chevrolet Camaro	30	Terry Wyhoon
Michael Graham	Holden VS Commodore	31	Michael Graham
Bell Real Estate	Holden Monaro	32	Michael Robinson
RMCP	Holden VK Commodore	35	Simon Copping
Shannons/Mount Aqua	Chevrolet Corvette GTS	38	Des Wall
RK&T Young Plumbing	Mazda RX-7	41	Trent Young
Aston Air Conditioning	Ford EB Falcon	43	Chris Donnelly
MR Automotive	Rover Vitesse	44	Colin Smith
Campbelltown Frames & Trusses	Jaguar XKR	45	Daniel Jameson
Coaststeer Auto Services	Holden Calibra	46	David McGinniss
Pallet Handling Systems	Alfa Romeo GTV6	47	Mark Papadopoulos
Executive Heating & Cooling	Mazda RX-7	48	Luke Chambers
Marinelli's Mechanical & Performance	Holden VS Commodore	51	Bob McLoughlin
Jamison & Craig Consultants	Holden Gemini	51	Stephen Craig
Panorama Smash	Holden VK Commodore	53	Steve Kilic
BJ Banks Electrical	Mazda RX-7	56	Bruce Banks
Sullivan Motorsport	Nissan Bluebird	57	Sean Sullivan
Quality Concreting	Mazda RX-7	59	Lester Ervin
Quality Concreting	Mazda RX-7	59	Bobby Ervin
Fivestar Fencing & Gates	Chevrolet Corvette GTS	66	Dean Camm
GTA Motorsport	Alfa Romeo GTV6	67	Andrew Leithhead
Aston Air Conditioning	Chevrolet Camaro	68	Shane Bradford
Ramsdale Wreckers/Blush Photography	Holden LC Torana	73	Garry Roberts
Dance Expression	Fiat 131	76	Nick Smith
Steven Shipway	Toyota Crown	77	Steven Shipway
R&L Uhlhorn	Mazda RX-7	83	Lee Uhlhorn
Esjay Commercial Plastering	Holden VS Commodore	88	Ian Rice
Hornet Press	Ford Mustang	89	Graham Bell
Kerrick	Saab 9-3 Aero	93	Dean Randle
Bohler Uddeholm Australia	Nissan 300ZX	97	Anthony Macready
Wildridge Fabrications	Ford EF Falcon	98	Jeff Brown

== Results and standings ==
=== Race calendar ===
The 2009 Kerrick Sports Sedan Series consisted of five rounds, three of which were held at Shannons Nationals Motor Racing Championships meetings and two at other meetings.

Rd.	Race title	Circuit	Location / state	Date	Winner
1	(New South Wales) Shannons Nationals R2	Wakefield Park	Goulburn, New South Wales	25–26 Apr	Tony Ricciardello
2	(South Australia) Clem Smith Cup	Mallala Motor Sport Park	Mallala, South Australia	6–7 Jun	Des Wall
3	(New South Wales) Shannons Nationals R8	Oran Park Raceway	Sydney, New South Wales	29–30 Aug	Darren Hossack
4	(New South Wales) Oran Park	Oran Park Raceway	Sydney, New South Wales	31 Oct – 1 Nov	Kerry Baily
5	(Victoria (state)) 50k Plate	Phillip Island Grand Prix Circuit	Phillip Island, Victoria	21–22 Nov	Tony Ricciardello

Note: The Clem Smith Cup was awarded to the winner of Race 2 at the Mallala round.

=== Drivers' points ===
Points were awarded 20-17-15-13-12-11-10-9-8-7-6-5-4-3-2-1 based on the top sixteen race positions in each race. There were two bonus points allocated for pole position. Pole position is indicated in bold text.

Pos	Driver	Round 1 – Wak			Round 2 – Mal			Round 3 – Or1			Round 4 – Or2			Round 5 – Phi			Pts
Pos	Driver	Race 1	Race 2	Race 3	Race 1	Race 2	Race 3	Race 1	Race 2	Race 3	Race 1	Race 2	Race 3	Race 1	Race 2	Race 3	Pts
1	Des Wall	3rd	3rd	5th	1st	3rd	1st	3rd	3rd	5th	8th	3rd	1st	**2nd**	2nd	5th	231
2	Tony Ricciardello	2nd	1st	1st	2nd	1st	9th	Ret	5th	2nd	1st	4th	Ret	3rd	1st	1st	219
3	Darren Hossack	**1st**	2nd	7th	**10th**	2nd	2nd	**1st**	1st	1st	**2nd**	Ret	DNS	1st	Ret	2nd	210
4	Kerry Baily	4th	4th	2nd				2nd	2nd	3rd	3rd	2nd	2nd				141
5	Chris Jackson	7th	6th	4th				14th	4th	4th	5th	1st	4th				109
6	Scott Butler	6th	5th	3rd				7th	Ret	8th	6th	5th	11th	15th	10th	4th	108
7	David McGinniss	10th	Ret	6th				8th	Ret	DNS	12th	Ret	7th	9th	5th	8th	71
8	Bob McLoughlin				4th	6th	4th	13th	8th	11th	11th	12th	DNS				70
9	Bruce Banks				7th	7th	5th	15th	10th	11th	16th	14th	12th	13th	DNS	Ret	60
10	Daniel Tamasi							5th	Ret	Ret	9th	6th	Ret	4th	4th	Ret	57
11	Dean Camm							Ret	8th	9th	7th	Ret	3rd	6th	18th	Ret	53
12	Trent Young	5th	7th	DNS				6th	12th	7th							48
13	Graeme Gilliland				9th	9th	7th	17th	Ret	14th				18th	7th	14th	42
14	Jeff Barnes				3rd	4th	Ret	4th	Ret	Ret							41
15	Shane Bradford							10th	Ret	12th				8th	16th	3rd	37
16	Damien Jameson							14th	9th	Ret	13th	8th	5th				36
17	Damien Johnson				Ret	8th	Ret	18th	11th	15th				19th	10th	7th	33
18	Michael Robinson				6th	5th	8th										32
19	Phil Crompton							9th	6th	6th							30
19	Anthony Macready	8th	DNS	DNS				Ret	DNS	DNS	4th	9th	Ret				30
21	Mark Nelson				5th	Ret	3rd										27
22	Dean Randle													7th	3rd	Ret	25
23	Colin Smith							16th	13th	Ret	14th	10th	8th				24
24	Ian Rice													12th	6th	10th	23
25	Ian Wilson				8th	Ret	6th										20
26	Dave Loftus										15th	11th	6th				19
27	Laurie Williams													14th	8th	11th	18
28	Lester Ervin	9th	8th	DNS													17
28	Graham Smith	Ret	DNS	DNS							10th	7th	Ret				17
30	Neil Bryson				Ret	Ret	DNS	19th	Ret	DNS				11th	9th	Ret	14
31	Chris Donnelly							11th	Ret	Ret				10th	Ret	Ret	13
32	Lee Uhlhorn													20th	15th	6th	18
33	Nick Smith							Ret	Ret	13th	Ret	16th	10th				12
33	Jeff Brown										17th	13th	9th				12
33	Terry Wyhoon													5th	DNS	DNS	12
33	Ken House													25th	13th	9th	12
37	Luke Chambers													16th	12th	12th	11
38	Garry Stevens										18th	15th	13th	22nd	Ret	**DSQ**	6
39	Nicholas Cambridge													24th	17th	13th	4
40	Darren Steeden										21st	17th	14th				3
40	Chas Talbot													17th	14th	Ret	3
42	Andrew Leithhead										20th	Ret	15th				2
43	Norman Stokes							DNS	DNS	DNS	26th	19th	16th				1
	Glenn Pro										DNS	Ret	17th				
	Kerry Millar										25th	20th	18th				
	Sean Sullivan										22nd	18th	21st				
	Simon Copping										19th	DNS	20th				
	Steve Kilic										29th	22nd	19th				
	Mark Papadopoulos										23rd	21st	Ret				
	Michael Graham													21st	DNS	DNS	
	Steve Shipway										28th	23rd	Ret				
	Wayne Purdon													23rd	DNS	DNS	
	Paddy Matchett										Ret	24th	Ret				
	Joe Said										24th	Ret	Ret				
	Graham Bell													26th	DNS	DNS	
	Robin O'Hare										27th	DNS	DNS				
	Garry Roberts													Ret	DNS	DNS	
	Bobby Ervin							**DSQ**	Ret	DNS							

Colour	Result
Gold	Winner
Silver	Second place
Bronze	Third place
Green	Points classification
Blue	Non-points classification
Blue	Non-classified finish (NC)
Purple	Retired, not classified (Ret)
Red	Did not qualify (DNQ)
Red	Did not pre-qualify (DNPQ)
Black	Disqualified (DSQ)
White	Did not start (DNS)
White	Withdrew (WD)
White	Race cancelled (C)
Blank	Did not practice (DNP)
Blank	Did not arrive (DNA)
Blank	Excluded (EX)
