= 2004 Tranzam Sports Sedan Series =

Motor racing competition

The 2004 Tranzam Sports Sedan Series was an Australian motor racing competition open to Sports Sedans and Trans Am type cars. The series was administered by the National Australian Sports Sedan Association and was sanctioned by CAMS as a National Series. Held as the first Tranzam Sports Sedan Series following the discontinuation of the Australian Sports Sedan Championship at the end of 2003, it was won by Darren Hossack driving a Saab 9-3.

== Calendar ==
The series was contested over five rounds with three races per round.

Round	Circuit	Date
1	Mallala Motor Sport Park	9 May
2	Winton Motor Raceway	6 June
3	Oran Park Raceway - South Circuit	27 June
4	Eastern Creek International Raceway	1 August
5	Oran Park Grand Prix Circuit	13 November

== Eligible cars ==
The following cars were eligible to compete in the series:

- Class SS: Space framed Sports Sedans complying with CAMS Group 3D Sports Sedan regulations
- Class TS: Transam cars complying with regulations for North American Transam competition
- Class TZ: TraNZam cars complying with the relevant New Zealand regulations
- Class TA: Australian TA cars complying with National Australian Sports Sedan Association Class TA regulations

== Points system ==
Series points were awarded in each race according to the following criteria:

Position	1st	2nd	3rd	4th	5th	6th	7th	8th	9th	10th	11th	12th	13th	14th	15th	Other finishers
Points	20	18	15	136	12	11	10	9	8	7	6	5	4	3	2	1

In addition, 2 points were awarded for first place in qualifying.

== Series standings ==
Position	Driver	No.	Car	Entrant
1	Darren Hossack	4	Saab 9-3 Aero Chevrolet	Audi Spares
2	Tony Ricciardello	5	Alfa Romeo Alfetta GTV Chevrolet	B&M Ricciardello Motors
3	Bernard Gillon	3	Ford Mustang Cobra	Powerbuilt Tools

The above table lists only the top three placegetters.
