= Darren Hossack =

Australian racing driver

- Nationality: Australian
- Born: 1 April 1970 (age 56)

Australian Sports Sedan Series career
- Years active: 2002–12
- Teams: John Gourlay
- Best finish: 1st in 2004 & 2008 Australian Sports Sedan Series

Previous series
- 1992 1997–2003 2007–2012: Victorian Formula Ford; V8 Supercar; Australian Superkart Champ.

Championship titles
- 1992 2004 2008 2008 2010: Victorian Formula Ford Champ. Australian Sports Sedan; Australian Sports Sedan; Australian Superkart Champ. Australian Superkart Champ.

Darren Hossack (born 1 April 1970) is a multiple-championship winning Australian race car driver.

== Early career ==
A long time kart racing driver, working professionally in the industry for Drew Price Engineering, Hossack stepped into circuit racing in 1992 in state level Formula Ford, and won the Victorian championship in his debut season, a first title for emerging Formula Ford constructor, Spectrum. Without the funding to progress his career stalled at this point, taking him back to kart racing, picking up the Australian Reed Light Championship in 1994, and also into dirt-track Speedway, running Super Sedans.

== Touring Cars ==
An opportunity opened in 1997 for Hossack, driving the Wynns backed Holden Commodore in the 1997 Australian Touring Car Championship, and impressed in the midfield, snatching several top ten results during the season. For the final round he moved into a Gibson Motorsport run Commodore, which continued into the endurance season where on his Bathurst debut, he and co-driver Steven Ellery finished in sixth position, the highest placed finish for any rookie in the race.

1998 saw a full-time drive in the Gibson Motor Sport team along with Wynns backed teammate Darren Pate, and Ellery also as teammate in a Holden Young Lions liveried Commodore. Hampered by Yokohama tyres, which were no match for Bridgestone and Dunlop shod teams, it was not a happy season and Hossack was replaced after the Barbagallo Raceway round by experienced veteran Tomas Mezera as the team struggled for pace. Hossack returned to the team for the endurance races and paired with Pate, took eighth place at the Sandown 500 and seventh at Bathurst.

While a full-time V8 Supercar drive did not return, Hossack was a valued endurance co-driver for the next several seasons, driving for Romano Racing in 1999 and returning to Gibson Motorsport in 2000 with a highlight of ninth position for GMS with David 'Truckie' Parsons at Bathurst in 2000. After a few seasons away from V8 Supercars, Hossack returned in 2003, driving a third Ford Performance Racing Falcon with Adam Macrow.

== Australian Champion ==
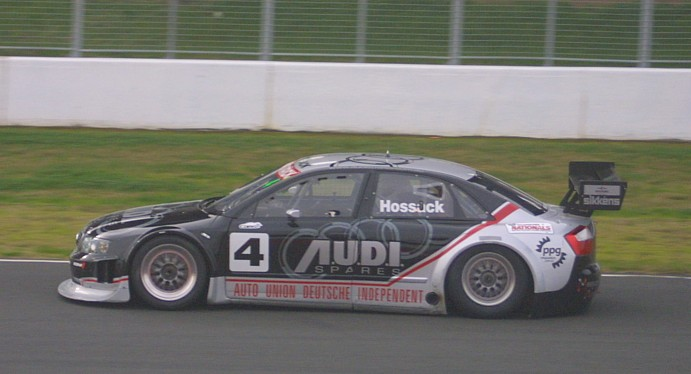
John Gourlay owned Audi A4 Sports Sedan

Hossack became involved in John Gourlay's Sports Sedan team, driving a Chevrolet V8 powered Saab 900. He finished runner up to Tony Ricciardello in the 2002 Australian Sports Sedan Championship, and fourth in 2003 behind Kerry Baily, Dean Randle and Ricciardello, before claiming a hard-fought win in the 2004 Tranzam Sports Sedan Series. After placing third in the 2005 series the team scaled down their efforts over the next few years having come to the end of the Saab's racing career (it was sold during the 2006 season to Mark Nelson) and construction began on a new race car. Again Chevrolet V8 powered, the Audi A4 made its debut in 2007, and quickly became a race winning car. In an epic finale to the 2008 season, with the pointscore tied heading into the final race Hossack beat 2007 series winner Ricciardello to win the race and the series by three points.

The 2007 season saw Hossack begin racing Superkarts as well, racing the Anderson Maverick owned by Scott Ellis' Safe Evolutions team, which Ellis was using to prove his own engine design, the Safe Racing Engine, which was a modern re-interpretation of the 20-year-old Rotax 256 design. Promising results in the first season lead to his first race wins, first at state level in Victoria, then in front of a national field on the support program of the 2008 Eastern Creek round of the V8 Supercar Championship.

Two race wins at the opening round of the Australian Superkart Championship also held at Eastern Creek Raceway set up a points buffer which was whittled away as the final round at Mallala Motor Sport Park progressed. With a slender points lead to protect, and title rivals Sam Zavaglia and Gary Pegoraro winning races almost lost the title. After almost stalling on the final race, Hossack raced back through the field, overtaking 25 karts over the eight lap finale to climb into third place on the final lap. With Zavaglia finishing second, it gave the title to Hossack by just three points.

Hossack lost both titles in 2009, his rivalry with Tony Ricciardello saw category veteran Des Wall win the Sports Sedan series with a consistent run, and Sam Zavaglia took the Superkart title with a career best season. Hossack was third in Sports Sedans and second in Superkarts. 2010 saw a return to the title claiming his second Australian Championship in Superkarts after win in the final race of the series broke a tie with Warren McIlveen whose previously points leading Superkart limped to the line in third position.

== Career results ==
Season	Series	Position	Car	Team
1992	Victorian Formula Ford Championship	1st	Spectrum - Ford	Borland Racing
1994	Australian Reed Light Championship	1st	Demon XP2	Arrow Racing Team
1996	Australian Clubman Light Championship	1st	Arrow AX6	Arrow Racing Team
1997	Australian Touring Car Championship	17th	Holden VR Commodore; Holden VS Commodore	Wynns Racing; Gibson Motorsport
1998	Australian Touring Car Championship	20th	Holden VS Commodore	Gibson Motorsport
1999	V8 Supercar Championship Series	52nd	Holden VS Commodore	Romano Racing
2000	V8 Supercar Championship Series	31st	Holden VT Commodore	Gibson Motorsport
2002	Australian Sports Sedan Championship	2nd	Saab 900 - Chevrolet	John Gourlay
2003	V8 Supercar Championship Series	53rd	Ford BA Falcon	Ford Performance Racing
2003	Australian Sports Sedan Championship	4th	Saab 900 - Chevrolet	John Gourlay
2004	Tranzam Sports Sedan Series	1st	Saab 9-3 - Chevrolet	John Gourlay
2005	Tranzam Sports Sedan Series	3rd	Saab 900 - Chevrolet	John Gourlay
2006	Kerrick Sports Sedan Series	11th	Saab 900 - Chevrolet	John Gourlay
2007	Kerrick Sports Sedan Series	19th	Audi A4 - Chevrolet	John Gourlay
2007	Australian Superkart Championship	5th	Anderson Maverick - SAFE	Safe Evolutions
2008	Kerrick Sports Sedan Series	1st	Audi A4 - Chevrolet	John Gourlay
2008	Australian Superkart Championship	1st	Anderson Maverick - SAFE	Safe Evolutions
2009	Kerrick Sports Sedan Series	3rd	Audi A4 - Chevrolet	John Gourlay
2009	Australian Superkart Championship	2nd	Anderson Maverick - SAFE	Safe Evolutions
2010	Australian Superkart Championship	1st	Anderson Maverick - SAFE	Safe Evolutions
2010	Kerrick Sports Sedan Series	2nd	Audi A4 - Chevrolet	Auto Union Deutsche
2011	Australian Superkart Championship	4th	Anderson Maverick - SAFE	Safe Evolutions
2011	Kerrick Sports Sedan Series	4th	Audi A4 - Chevrolet	John Gourlay
2012	Australian Superkart Championship	2nd	Anderson Maverick - SAFE	Safe Evolutions
2012	Kerrick Sports Sedan Series	3rd	Audi A4 - Chevrolet	John Gourlay
2013	Kerrick Sports Sedan Series	7th	Audi A4 - Chevrolet	John Gourlay
2014	Kerrick Sports Sedan Series	3rd	Audi A4	Auto Union Deutsche
2015	Kerrick Sports Sedan Series	18th	Audi A4	Auto Union Deutsche
