= 2010 Australian Superkart Championship =

2010 Australian Superkart

Seasons
- ← 2009 2011 →

The 2010 Australian Superkart season covers national level Superkart racing in Australia during 2010. There were just two national level race meetings in 2010, both held on the calendar of the Shannons Nationals Motor Racing Championships, making up the 2010 Dunlop Australian Superkart Championship.

Darren Hossack, Martin Latta and Steven Tamasi won the Australian championships.

== Australian Superkart Championship ==
The 2010 Dunlop Australian Superkart Championship was the 22nd running of the national championships for Superkarts. It began on 1 May 2010 at Phillip Island Grand Prix Circuit and will end on 15 August at Morgan Park Raceway after eight races. It was contested for three engine configuration based classes, 250 cc International, 250 National and 125 cc.

A third national level event was scheduled for 29–30 May at Mallala Motor Sport Park for the non-gearbox Rotax Max family of classes, but did not go ahead due to poor competitor support. The event was later rescheduled for 29 October at Wakefield Park to be held as the 2010 Australian Rotax Superkart Nationals.

== Teams and drivers ==
The following drivers competed in the 2010 Australian Superkart Championship. The series consisted of two rounds, with four races at each meeting.

Team	Class	Chassis	Engine	No	Driver
Sam Zavaglia Racing	250 International	Stockman MR2	Honda RS250	1	(New South Wales) Sam Zavaglia
Sam Zavaglia Racing	250 International	Stockman MR2	Yamaha TZ250	9	(United Kingdom) Trevor Roberts
Sam Zavaglia Racing	125 Gearbox	Gold Viper	Honda RS125R	19	(New South Wales) Stephen Castles (New South Wales) Dalton Rowell
Rocket Race Engines	250 International	Anderson Mirage	SAFE	4	(Victoria (state)) Rod Prickett
Maddern Oil P/L	250 International	PVP	PVP	5	(South Australia) Charles Maddern
Viper Racing UK; MJR Bricklaying	250 National	Anderson Maverick	Honda CR250R	6	(Victoria (state)) Martin Latta
IGA Supermarkets; Romeo's Foodland	125 Gearbox	Stockman MR2	Honda RS125R	7	(South Australia) Anthony Lappas
Dunlop; Art Motorsport	250 International	PVP	FPE	8	(New Zealand) Anton Stevens
RMR Superkarts	250 International	Anderson Maverick	BRC 250FE	10	(Victoria (state)) Gary Pegoraro
RMR Superkarts	250 National	Anderson Maverick	Yamaha YZ250	15	(Victoria (state)) Luke May
RMR Superkarts	250 National	Stockman MR2	Yamaha YZ250	20	(Victoria (state)) Luke May
RMR Superkarts	250 National	Anderson Maverick		26	(New Zealand) Wayne Sprostan
Precision Contracting	250 International	Stockman MR2		11	(Victoria (state)) Darren Kitchen
Rockpress	125 Gearbox	Stockman MR2	Honda RS125R	12	(Queensland) Phil Silcock
Smash Solutions	250 International	PVP	PVP	13	(Denmark) Poul V. Petersen
Top Torque	125 Gearbox	Stockman MR2	Honda RS125R	14	(Victoria (state)) Matt Bass
Top Torque	250 International	Stockman MR2	Honda RS250	40	(Victoria (state)) Greg Bass
Safe Evolutions	250 International	Anderson Maverick	SAFE	16	(Victoria (state)) Darren Hossack
Sugarless Confectionary Co.	250 International	Stockman MR2	Yamaha TZ250	17	(Queensland) Phil Webb
Stockman Superkarts	250 International	Stockman MR2	Honda RS250	18	(New South Wales) Warren McIlveen
Buildersmile Constructions	250 International	PVP	PVP	20	(Queensland) Carlo Chermaz
Nick Paul	250 International	Stockman MR2	Honda RS250	21	(South Australia) Robert Oakley
Broadbent Compressor Services	125 Gearbox	Topkart	Honda RS125R	22	(Victoria (state)) Darren Dunn
Floth Sustainable Building Consultants	125 Gearbox	Avoig Elise	Honda RS125R	23	(Queensland) Tim Philp
Internode; Davtec	250 International	Zip Eagle	BRC 250FE	28	(South Australia) Ilya Harpas
Internode; Davtec	250 International	Zip Eagle II	BRC 250FE	29	(South Australia) Yiani Harpas
Fuji Xerox	250 International	Anderson Maverick	FPE 250	30	(Queensland) Jason Smith
All Site Asbestos	250 International	Stockman MR2	Honda RS250	31	(Queensland) Nathan Shearman
Coach Design; Linra Property Group	125 Gearbox	Stockman MR2 Laydown	Honda RS125R	32	(Queensland) Drene Jamieson
Coach Design; Linra Property Group	250 International	Stockman MR2	Honda RS250	35	(Queensland) Russell Jamieson
Coach Design; Linra Property Group	125 Gearbox	Stockman MR2 Laydown	Honda RS125R	75	(Queensland) Lindsay Jamieson
Coach Design; Linra Property Group	250 International	Anderson Maverick	Honda RS250	86	(Queensland) Chryss Jamieson
Suburban Accounting	250 International	Stockman MR2	Yamaha TZ250; Honda RS250	33; 43	(Victoria (state)) Kristian Stebbing
Suburban Accounting	125 Gearbox	Stockman MR2	Yamaha TZ125	77	(Victoria (state)) Brad Stebbing
Cycle City	125 Gearbox	Stockman MR2	Honda RS125R	34	(New South Wales) Jeff Reed
Seaford Truck Refinishers	250 National	Anderson Mirage	Yamaha YZ250	41	(Victoria (state)) Brendan Ludeman
Seaford Truck Refinishers	250 National	Anderson Mirage	Yamaha YZ250	48	(Victoria (state)) Brendan Ludeman
Seaford Truck Refinishers	250 National	Anderson Mirage	Yamaha YZ250	48	(Victoria (state)) Matthew Palmer
Seaford Truck Refinishers	250 National	Stockman MR2	Kawasaki KX250	67	(Victoria (state)) Matthew Palmer
	250 National	Eliminator		44	(Queensland) Paul Snaith
Polystyrene Solutions	250 National	PVP Raider	Honda CR250R	46	(Queensland) Bob Fullerton
Bluff Racing	125 Gearbox	Gladiator	Yamaha TZ125	47	(Queensland) Doug Amiss
Ciscos Race Tunning	250 International	Anderson Maverick		49	(Victoria (state)) Steven Haywood
N&G Motor Repairs; Iguana Signs & Concepts	125 Gearbox	Stockman MR2	Honda RS125R	50	(Queensland) Brian Wild
Speedy Gonzales Team	125 Gearbox	Avoig Elise	Honda RS125R	52	(New South Wales) Anthony Cristallo
Crispy Racing	250 National	Anderson Maverick	Yamaha YZ250	58	(Victoria (state)) David Yuill
RFC Race Team	250 International	Anderson Maverick	Honda RS250	60	(Queensland) David McAdam
Gas Action Services	250 International	PVP	Honda RS250	61	(Queensland) Steven Murray
Avoig Racing	125 Gearbox	Avoig Elise	Honda RS125R	63	(New South Wales) John Pellicano
GR Industries	250 National	Stockman MR2		66	(Victoria (state)) Frank Giglio
BK Electrical	250 National	Formula 1	Honda CR250R	71	(Queensland) Barry Kunowski
Stockman Superkarts/Top Torque	250 International	Stockman MR2	Honda RS250	74	(Queensland) Jason Laker
JND Constructions	250 International	Anderson Mirage	Honda RS250	78	(Queensland) Joshua Barnett
Betta Calibrations	250 National	Stockman MR2		82	(Victoria (state)) Brett Campbell
Domain Prestige Homes	125 Gearbox	Stockman MR2	Honda RS125R	91	(Victoria (state)) Steven Tamasi
J. Shelton & Co	125 Gearbox	Avoig Elise	Honda RS125R	93	(New South Wales) Jeremy Shelton
Phoenix Dental Laboratory	250 International	Zip Eagle II	Yamaha TZ250	96	(Western Australia) Mark Hanson

== Season review ==
Former 100 cc non-gearbox Superkart Champion Gary Pegoraro finally broke through to claim a round win of the Australian Superkart Championship after coming close on many occasions in the last four years. Pegoraro won the wet second race as well as the bonus point fourth race at Phillip Island and finished third in the other two races in a consistent and fast weekend. 2008 champion Darren Hossack capitalised on a mistake by Trevor Roberts on the second last corner to win race 3 and combined that with second places in races two and four to be just five points behind Pegoraro as Anderson Karts dominated the opening round. Visiting Northern Ireland racer Trevor Roberts finished third for the round on his first visit to Australia with second places in races one and three and a third in the fourth race. Race one winner Warren McIlveen sat fourth in the points, slowed by a disappointing result in race three.

Best of the rest was Anton Stevens, whose PVP claimed a third and a fourth over the weekend and was consistently fast near the front runners. Defending champion Sam Zavaglia had a lot of work to do to come from 40 points down and sat ninth behind Ilya Harpas and Chryss Jamieson.

Luke May and Martin Latta fought over the 250 National class all weekend, trading firsts and seconds. A third-place finish in race 2 for Latta made the difference and May led the series by two points. David Yuill led the rest of the resurgent class, competing for Australian championship status for the first time since 2006. Yuill was fast in the very wet second race on Sunday morning, finishing just behind May, well up in the top ten overall. Consistency put perennial 250 National race Frank Giglio fourth in the points, ahead of STR's Matthew Palmer, the de facto defending class champion.

Twice former 125 cc champion Darren Dunn made a blitzing return to the class, winning the final race of the weekend to pull ten points clear of defending champion Steven Tamasi. Tamasi won the first race of the weekend on Saturday afternoon but Sunday saw the teenager plagued with power issues which saw him last across the line in race four. The weekend saw each race claimed by a different racer; veteran Jeff Reed won race two to be third in the points behind Tamasi while race-three winner Anothony Lappas languished seventh after a pair of retirements slowed his weekend. Brad Stebbing and John Pellicano sat fourth and fifth.

== Results and standings ==
=== Gearbox race calendar ===
The 2010 Dunlop Australian Superkart Championship season consisted of two rounds. Four races were held at both race meetings.

Rd.	Circuit	City / state	Date	Winner 250 International	Team	Winner 250 National	Team	Winner 125 Gearbox	Team
1	(Victoria (state)) Phillip Island Grand Prix Circuit	Phillip Island, Victoria	1–2 May	Gary Pegoraro	RMR Superkarts	Luke May	Velocity Management	Darren Dunn	Broadbent Compressor Services
2	(Queensland) Morgan Park Raceway	Warwick, Queensland	14–15 August	Warren McIlveen	Stockman Superkarts	Martin Latta	Viper Racing UK	Steven Tamasi	Domain Prestige Homes

Rd	Circuit	City / state	Date	Winner Rotax Light	Team	Winner Rotax Heavy	Team
Rotax	(New South Wales) Wakefield Park	Goulburn, New South Wales	29 October				

=== Drivers Championship ===
Points were awarded 20-17-15-13-11-10-9-8-7-6-5-4-3-2-1 based on the top fifteen race positions in first three races of each round. The fourth race of each round, which is longer than the others (eight laps vs five laps) awarded points for the top twenty race positions at 25-22-20-18-16-15-14-13-12–11-10-9-8-7-6-5-4-3-2-1. Points sourced from in part:

Pos	Driver	PHI 1	PHI 2	PHI 3	PHI 4	MOR 1	MOR 2	MOR 3	MOR 4	Pts
250 INTERNATIONAL
1	Darren Hossack	5th	2nd	1st	2nd	3rd	3rd	3rd	1st	140
2	Warren McIlveen	1st	4th	7th	4th	1st	1st	1st	3rd	140
3	Gary Pegoraro	3rd	1st	3rd	1st	2nd	4th	Ret	DNS	105
4	Sam Zavaglia	Ret	12th	4th	5th	6th	2nd	2nd	4th	97
5	Ilya Harpas	9th	5th	5th	9th	5th	5th	6th	8th	86
6	Jason Smith	6th	Ret	10th	7th	4th	Ret	Ret	2nd	65
7	Trevor Roberts	2nd	6th	2nd	3rd					64
8	Chryss Jamieson	8th	9th	9th	6th	Ret	Ret	9th	7th	62
9	Jason Laker					7th	6th	4th	5th	48
10	Mark Hanson	Ret	11th	15th	12th	26th	12th	15th	12th	48
11	Anton Stevens	4th	3rd	8th	11th	DNS	DNS	DNS	DNS	46
12	Steven Murray	DNS	Ret	35th	29th	9th	25th	5th	6th	41
13	Kristian Stebbing	11th	25th	6th	Ret	8th	7th	Ret	DNS	33
14	Rod Prickett	10th	DSQ	DNS	8th	10th	8th	Ret	Ret	33
15	Greg Bass	DNS	10th	13th	19th					18
16	Nathan Shearman					17th	16th	16th	Ret	16
17	Joshua Barnett					Ret	10th	10th	Ret	15
18	Robert Oakley	12th	Ret	Ret	10th					15
19	Steven Haywood	19th	17th	18th	17th					15
20	Poul V. Petersen	14th	23rd	21st	18th					11
21	Yiani Harpas	7th	Ret	Ret	Ret					9
22	David McAdam	Ret	24th	Ret	DNS	22nd	18th	Ret	DNS	9
23	Darren Kitchen	16th	DNS	DNS	16th					9
24	Phil Webb	35th	30th	30th	Ret	DNS	DNS	28th	Ret	8
25	Charles Maddern	13th	18th	Ret	Ret	Ret	DNS	DNS	DNS	7
26	Russell Jamieson	Ret	20th	16th	Ret	Ret	Ret	DNS	DNS	6
	Carlo Chermaz	DNS	DNS	DNS	DNS					
250 NATIONAL
1	Martin Latta	15th	21st	11th	14th	11th	DNS	7th	10th	142
2	Luke May	17th	7th	12th	13th	12th	9th	8th	Ret	133
3	Brendan Ludeman	24th	Ret	23rd	20th	16th	15th	14th	14th	105
4	Frank Giglio	26th	28th	28th	24th	21st	20th	DNS	15th	90
5	Wayne Sprostan	18th	22nd	14th	Ret	19th	DNS	19th	17th	83
6	David Yuill	20th	8th	17th	15th					63
7	Matthew Palmer	31st	33rd	26th	25th	DNS	DNS	DNS	DNS	44
8	Barry Kunowski	37th	34th	33rd	Ret	30th	Ret	DNS	DNS	34
9	Bob Fullerton	34th	Ret	Ret	Ret	Ret	Ret	27th	24th	33
10	Anton Stevens					Ret	Ret	Ret	11th	22
11	Paul Snaith					Ret	Ret	13th	Ret	15
	Brett Campbell	DNS	DNS	DNS	DNS					0
125 GEARBOX
1	Steven Tamasi	21st	19th	20th	32nd	13th	11th	11th	9th	145
2	Darren Dunn	22nd	15th	24th	21st	14th	13th	12th	13th	143
3	Jeff Reed	23rd	Ret	22nd	22nd	15th	14th	17th	18th	115
4	Tim Philp	28th	32nd	25th	Ret	18th	17th	18th	16th	86
5	John Pellicano	29th	14th	36th	28th	27th	22nd	23rd	Ret	71
6	Brad Stebbing	27th	13th	Ret	23rd	20th	24th	DNS	Ret	69
7	Jeremy Shelton	32nd	29th	29th	30th	23rd	19th	21st	Ret	69
8	Phil Silcock	36th	31st	34th	31st	29th	23rd	25th	22nd	65
9	Brian Wild	30th	Ret	32nd	26th	25th	Ret	22nd	Ret	50
10	Drene Jamieson	33rd	26th	27th	Ret	DNS	DNS	DNS	21st	40
11	Dalton Rowell					28th	21st	24th	20th	39
12	Lindsay Jamieson					24th	Ret	20th	19th	36
13	Anthony Lappas	25th	Ret	19th	Ret					33
14	Matt Bass	Ret	16th	Ret	27th					29
15	Stephen Castles	38th	27th	31st	Ret					21
16	Doug Amiss					Ret	Ret	26th	23rd	17
Pos	Driver	PHI 1	PHI 2	PHI 3	PHI 4	MOR 1	MOR 2	MOR 3	MOR 4	Pts

Colour	Result
Gold	Winner
Silver	Second place
Bronze	Third place
Green	Points classification
Blue	Non-points classification
Blue	Non-classified finish (NC)
Purple	Retired, not classified (Ret)
Red	Did not qualify (DNQ)
Red	Did not pre-qualify (DNPQ)
Black	Disqualified (DSQ)
White	Did not start (DNS)
White	Withdrew (WD)
White	Race cancelled (C)
Blank	Did not practice (DNP)
Blank	Did not arrive (DNA)
Blank	Excluded (EX)
