= 2010 Australian Sports Sedan season =

Motor racing competition

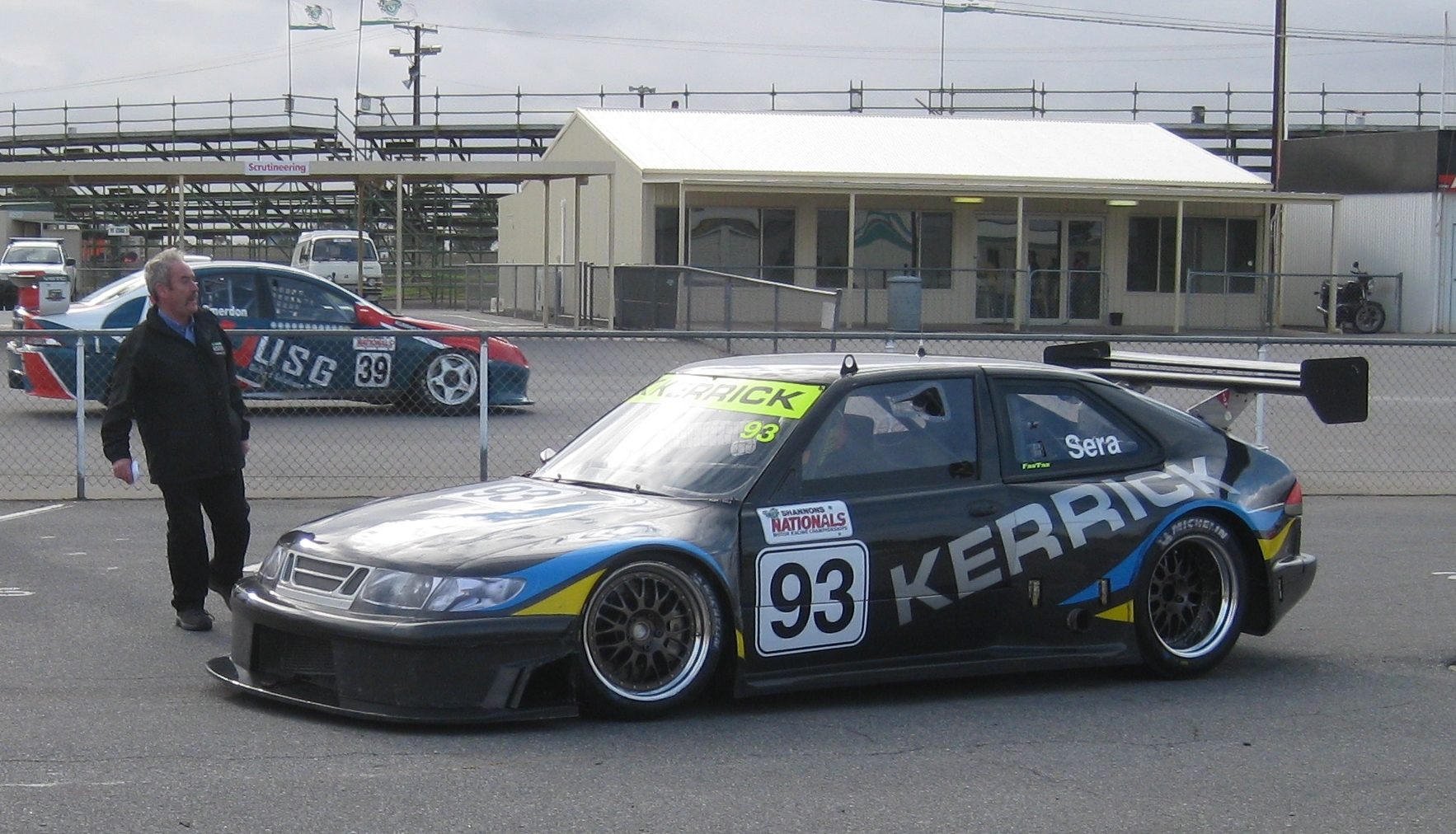
2010 Kerrick Sports Sedan Series winner, James Sera (Saab 9-3 Aero)

The 2010 Kerrick Sports Sedan Series was an Australian motor racing competition for Group 3D Sports Sedans, Trans-Am automobiles and New Zealand TraNZam automobiles. The series, which began on 6 March 2010 at Wakefield Park and ended on 24 October at Sandown Raceway after fifteen races, was televised on SBS program SBS Speedweek. 2010 was the 26th year in which an Australian Sports Sedan Championship or national series had been contested.

The series was won by kart racer James Sera, contesting his first national circuit racing series in the Saab 9-3 of 2006 Kerrick Sports Sedan Series winner Dean Randle. Despite missing the opening round of the series Sera claimed the title by 17 points over 2008 champion Darren Hossack (Audi A4). Sera took six wins and six seconds from his twelve starts in a near perfect season. Hossack took six wins but took no points away from the Morgan Park round after an engine failure. Hossack finished almost 80 points clear of third in the points, multiple series champion Kerry Baily. Baily, driving a Nissan 300ZX, was one of three drivers to take a single race win, all at the season's opening round at Wakefield Park. The other two drivers were outgoing champion Des Wall (Chevrolet Corvette) and Mazda RX-7 driver Trent Young.

== Vehicle eligibility ==
The series was open to the following automobiles:

- Sports Sedans complying with the Group 3D Sports Sedan Regulations as per the 2010 CAMS Manual of Motorsport
- Trans-am automobiles complying with A.S.S.C. regulations for North American Trans-am competition
- TraNZam automobiles complying with TRG of New Zealand regulations

== Teams and drivers ==
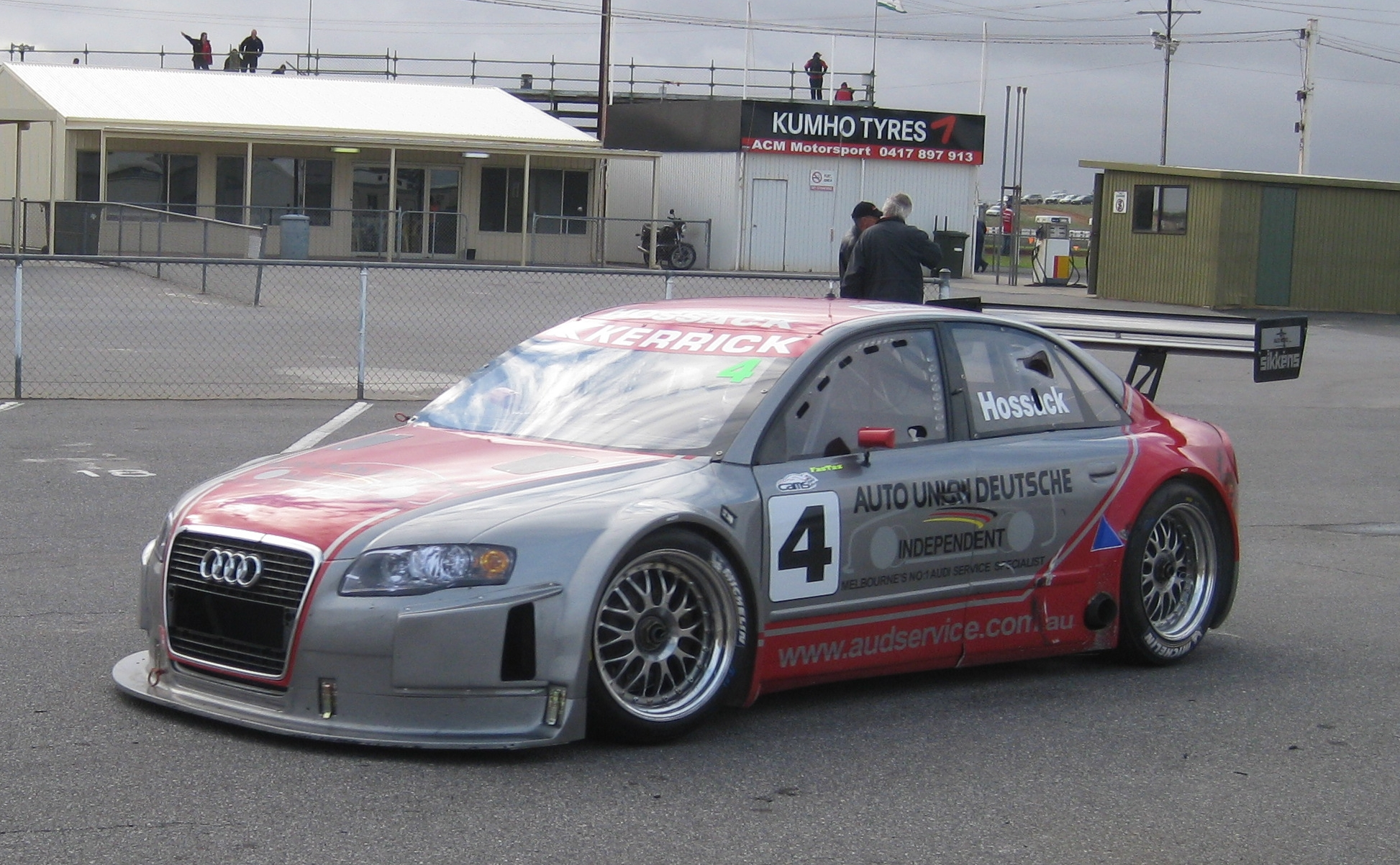
Darren Hossack placed second driving an Audi A4

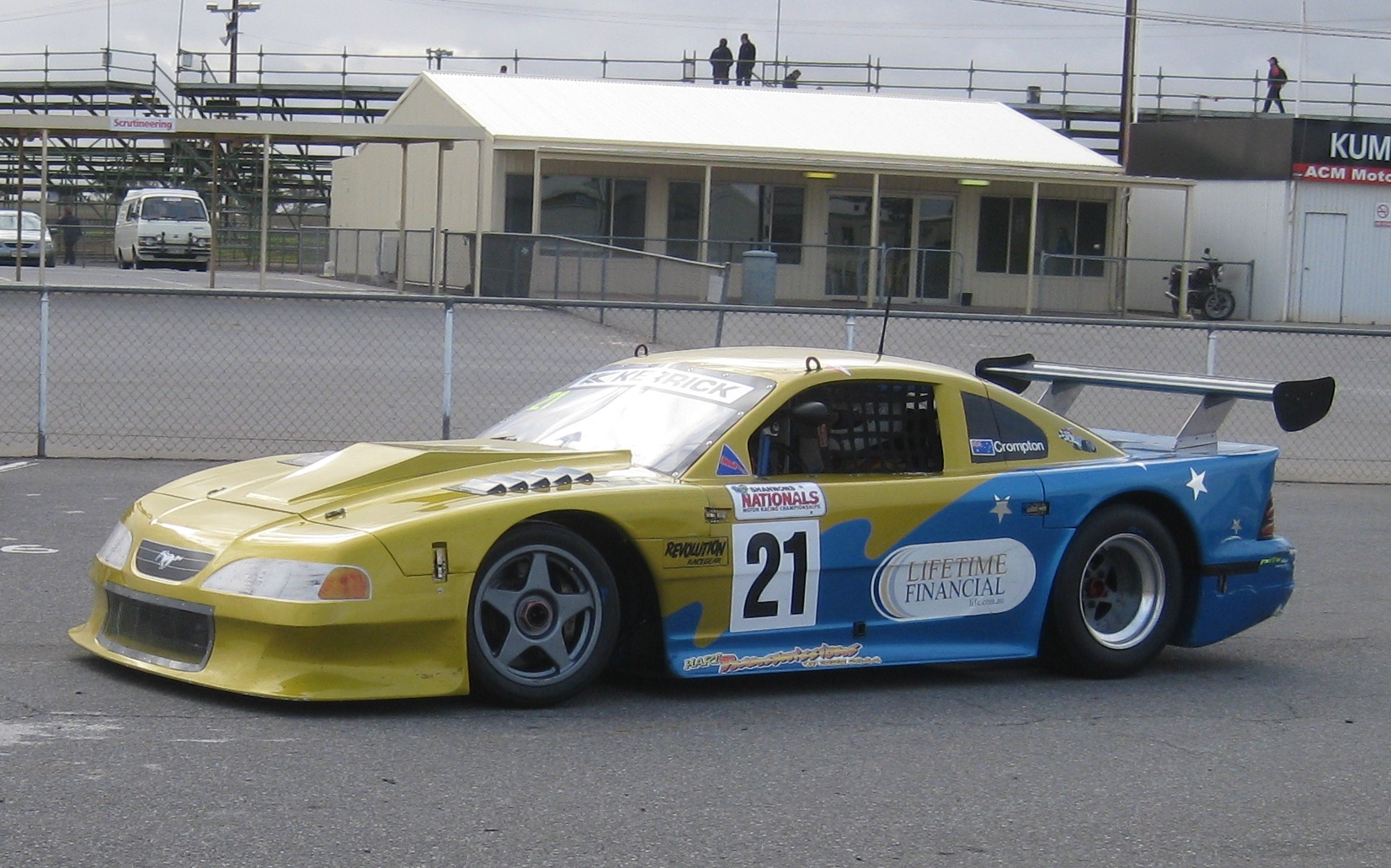
Phil Crompton placed fourth driving a Ford Mustang

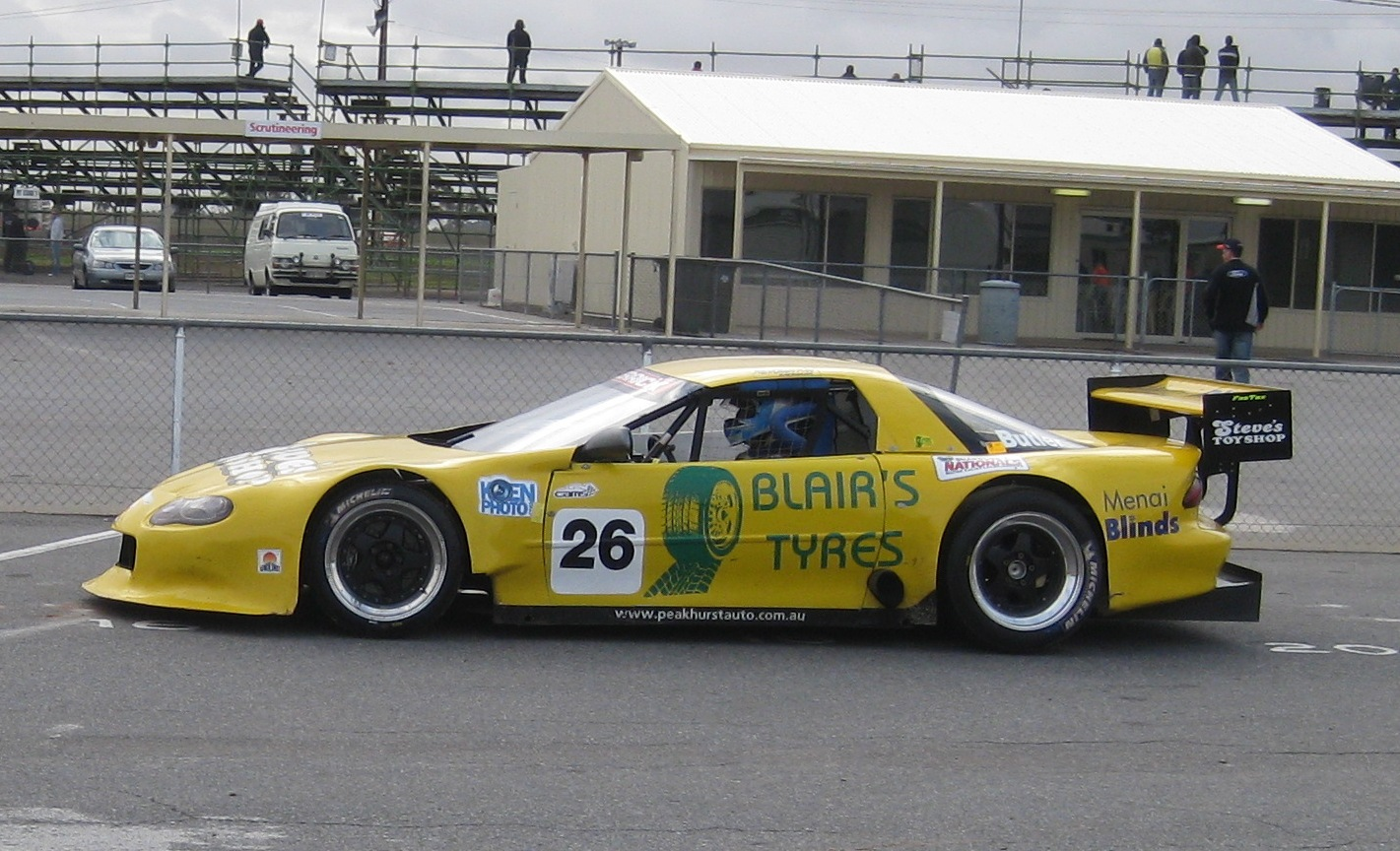
Scott Butler placed sixth driving a Chevrolet Camaro

The following drivers competed in the 2010 Kerrick Sports Sedan Series.

| Team | Model | No | Driver |
|---|---|---|---|
| Shannon's Mt Aqua Spring Water | Chevrolet Corvette GTS | 1 | Des Wall |
| Auto Union Deutsche | Audi A4 | 4 | Darren Hossack |
| Steven's Security | Mazda RX-7 | 5 | Garry Stevens |
| State Tennis Carline Exhausts | Mazda RX-7 | 7 | Simon Longhurst |
| PPG | Ford EF Falcon | 8 | Simon Pfitzner |
| Domain Prestige Homes | Opel Calibra | 9 | Daniel Tamasi |
| Centreline Suspension | Mazda RX-7 | 9 | Chris Muscat |
| Fuel 2 Race | Opel Calibra | 11 | Chris Jackson |
| Pakenham Tyrepower | Holden VN Commodore | 12 | Chas Talbot |
| Queensland Constructions | Honda Prelude | 15 | Charlie Senese |
| P&L Mechanical | Mazda RX-7 | 18 | Graeme Gilliland |
| Melbourne Performance Centre | Holden LJ Torana GTR XU-1 | 19 | Damien Johnson |
| Melbourne East Autosmart | Datsun 1200 | 20 | Clive Ablitt |
| Lifetime Financial | Ford Mustang | 21 | Phil Crompton |
| Aussie Smoke Alarms | Datsun 1000 | 22 | Paul Hibberd |
| Darren Steeden | Ford Escort MkI | 22 | Darren Steeden |
| Jocaro Motors | Opel Calibra | 25 | Neil Bryson |
| Steve's Toy Shop Blairs Tyres | Chevrolet Camaro | 26 | Scott Butler |
| Airey Industrial | Nissan 300ZX | 28 | Kerry Baily |
| Bell Real Estate | Holden Monaro | 32 | Michael Robinson |
| Elite Fleet | Mitsubishi Magna | 33 | Daniel Natoli |
| RK&T Young Plumbing | Mazda RX-7 | 41 | Trent Young |
| Mirror Stone | Mazda RX-4 | 42 | Brad Duckworth |
| Aston Air Conditioning | Ford EB Falcon | 43 | Chris Donnelly |
| MR Automotive | Rover Vitesse | 44 | Colin Smith |
| Coaststeer Automotive | Opel Calibra | 46 | Dave McGinniss |
| Interstate Finance & Leasing | Holden VK Commodore | 46 | Mark Bowen |
| Executive Heating & Cooling | Mazda RX-7 | 48 | Luke Chambers |
| Marinelli's Mechanical & Performance | Holden VS Commodore | 51 | Bob McLoughlin |
| 55 By Sportique | Mazda RX-7 | 55 | Sam Silvestro |
| BJ Banks Electrical | Mazda RX-7 | 56 | Bruce Banks |
| FM Pumps | Mazda RX-7 | 57 | Frank Mascadri |
| Quality Concreting | Mazda RX-7 | 59 | Bobby Ervin |
| Fivestar Fencing | Chevrolet Corvette GTS | 66 | Dean Camm |
| Aston Air Conditioning | Chevrolet Camaro | 68 | Shane Bradford |
| Austrack Motorsport | Holden VZ Commodore | 80 | Alfred Axisa |
| R&L Uhlhorn | Mazda RX-7 | 83 | Lee Uhlhorn |
| Esjay Commercial Plastering | Holden VS Commodore | 88 | Ian Rice |
| Swedish Prestige | Saab 9-3 Aero | 93 | Dean Randle |
| Swedish Prestige | Saab 9-3 Aero | 93 | James Sera |
| Rosemount Smash Repairs | Isuzu Gemini | 95 | Anthony Cox |
| AGM Engineering | Nissan 300ZX | 97 | Anthony Macready |

== Series calendar ==
The 2010 Kerrick Sports Sedan Series was contested over five rounds, each of which was held at Shannons Nationals Motor Racing Championships rounds.

| Rd. | Circuit | Location / state | Date | Format | Winner | Car |
|---|---|---|---|---|---|---|
| 1 | (New South Wales) Wakefield Park | Goulburn, New South Wales | 6–7 March | Three races | Kerry Baily | Nissan 300ZX |
| 2 | (South Australia) Mallala Motor Sport Park | Mallala, South Australia | 29–30 May | Three races | Darren Hossack | Audi A4 |
| 3 | (Queensland) Morgan Park Raceway | Warwick, Queensland | 14–15 August | Three races | James Sera | Saab 9-3 Aero |
| 4 | (New South Wales) Eastern Creek Raceway | Sydney, New South Wales | 11–12 September | Three races | James Sera | Saab 9-3 Aero |
| 5 | (Victoria (state)) Sandown Raceway | Melbourne, Victoria | 23–24 October | Three races | Darren Hossack | Audi A4 |

== Points system ==
Points were awarded on a 20-17-15-13-12-11-10-9-8-7-6-5-4-3-2 basis for the top fifteen positions in each race, with each other finisher receiving 1 point. There were two bonus points allocated to the driver gaining pole position at each round.

== Series results ==
| Pos | Driver | Round 1 - Wak. | | | Round 2 - Mal. | | | Round 3 - Mor. | | | Round 4 - Eas. | | | Round 5 - San. | | | Pts |
| Pos | Driver | Race 1 | Race 2 | Race 3 | Race 1 | Race 2 | Race 3 | Race 1 | Race 2 | Race 3 | Race 1 | Race 2 | Race 3 | Race 1 | Race 2 | Race 3 | Pts |
|---|---|---|---|---|---|---|---|---|---|---|---|---|---|---|---|---|---|
| 1 | James Sera | | | | 2nd | 2nd | 2nd | 1st | 1st | 1st | **1st** | 1st | 1st | 2nd | 2nd | 2nd | 224 |
| 2 | Darren Hossack | 3rd | 3rd | 2nd | **1st** | 1st | 1st | **Ret** | DNS | DNS | 2nd | 2nd | Ret | **1st** | 1st | 1st | 207 |
| 3 | Kerry Baily | **1st** | 2nd | 3rd | Ret | DNS | DNS | 2nd | 2nd | 2nd | 7th | Ret | 4th | | | | 128 |
| 4 | Phil Crompton | 4th | Ret | DNS | 9th | 4th | 3rd | 5th | 4th | 3rd | | | | 5th | 6th | 7th | 122 |
| 5 | Dean Camm | | | | 10th | 5th | Ret | 8th | 6th | 7th | 6th | 4th | 5th | 6th | 10th | 4th | 116 |
| 6 | Scott Butler | 6th | Ret | 18th | Ret | Ret | Ret | 6th | 3rd | 5th | 4th | **DSQ** | 3rd | 4th | 4th | Ret | 104 |
| 7 | Des Wall | 2nd | 1st | 4th | | | | | | | | | | 3rd | 5th | 3rd | 92 |
| 8 | Damien Johnson | 16th | 10th | 6th | 8th | 9th | 6th | 14th | 10th | 11th | 12th | 9th | 10th | 15th | 15th | 14th | 91 |
| 9 | Bob McLoughlin | 13th | 9th | 7th | 5th | 6th | 5th | 3rd | Ret | 4th | | | | | | | 85 |
| 10 | Bruce Banks | Ret | Ret | 11th | | | | Ret | 8th | 8th | 9th | 5th | 7th | 8th | 7th | 6th | 84 |
| 11 | Trent Young | 8th | 6th | 1st | 3rd | 3rd | 4th | Ret | DNS | DNS | | | | | | | 83 |
| 12 | Colin Smith | 14th | 12th | 16th | 7th | 7th | DNS | 7th | 5th | 6th | Ret | DNS | DNS | 11th | 12th | 10th | 80 |
| 13 | Chris Jackson | 11th | 5th | 9th | | | | | | | 3rd | 3rd | 2nd | | | | 73 |
| 14 | Graeme Gilliland | | | | 6th | 8th | 7th | 11th | 9th | 10th | | | | 13th | 13th | 12th | 64 |
| 15 | Michael Robinson | 12th | 8th | 19th | | | | | | | Ret | 6th | 8th | Ret | 8th | 5th | 56 |
| 16 | Charlie Senese | 9th | 7th | 12th | 4th | Ret | DNS | 9th | Ret | DNS | | | | | | | 44 |
| 17 | Dean Randle | 5th | 4th | 5th | | | | | | | | | | | | | 37 |
| 18 | Anthony Macready | 7th | Ret | 13th | | | | | | | 8th | 7th | Ret | | | | 33 |
| 19 | Daniel Natoli | 17th | 11th | 10th | | | | 12th | 14th | 13th | | | | | | | 26 |
| 20 | Chris Muscat | | | | | | | | | | | | | 7th | 3rd | Ret | 25 |
| 20 | Tony Cox | | | | | | | 10th | 7th | 9th | | | | | | | 25 |
| 22 | Darren Steeden | | | | | | | | | | 10th | 8th | 9th | | | | 24 |
| 22 | Ian Rice | | | | | | | | | | | | | 10th | 9th | 8th | 24 |
| 24 | Fred Axisa | | | | | | | | | | 5th | Ret | 6th | | | | 23 |
| 25 | Chris Donnelly | | | | | | | 4th | 11th | Ret | | | | | | | 19 |
| 25 | Luke Chambers | | | | | | | | | | | | | 12th | 11th | 9th | 19 |
| 27 | Chas Talbot | | | | | | | | | | | | | 9th | 16th | 11th | 15 |
| 28 | Frank Mascadri | | | | | | | Ret | 12th | 12th | | | | | | | 10 |
| 28 | Brad Duckworth | | | | | | | 14th | 13th | 14th | | | | | | | 10 |
| 28 | Lee Uhlhorn | | | | | | | | | | | | | 14th | 14th | 13th | 10 |
| 31 | Daniel Tamasi | Ret | DNS | 8th | | | | | | | | | | | | | 9 |
| 31 | Shane Bradford | 10th | Ret | 15th | | | | | | | | | | | | | 9 |
| 33 | Simon Pfitzner | | | | 11th | Ret | DNS | | | | | | | | | | 6 |
| 33 | Garry Stevens | | | | | | | | | | 11th | Ret | DNS | | | | 6 |
| 33 | Paul Hibberd | 18th | 13th | 17th | | | | | | | | | | | | | 6 |
| 36 | Sam Silvestro | DNS | DNS | DNS | | | | | | | 13th | Ret | DNS | | | | 4 |
| 37 | David McGinniss | Ret | DNS | 14th | | | | | | | | | | | | | 3 |
| 38 | Neil Bryson | 15th | Ret | Ret | | | | | | | | | | | | | 2 |
| | Bobby Ervin | Ret | Ret | DNS | | | | Ret | DNS | DNS | | | | | | | 0 |
| | Simon Longhurst | | | | Ret | Ret | Ret | | | | | | | | | | 0 |
| | Mark Bowen | | | | | | | Ret | DNS | DNS | | | | | | | 0 |
| | Clive Ablitt | | | | | | | | | | | | | Ret | Ret | Ret | 0 |

| Colour | Result |
|---|---|
| Gold | Winner |
| Silver | Second place |
| Bronze | Third place |
| Green | Points classification |
| Blue | Non-points classification |
| Blue | Non-classified finish (NC) |
| Purple | Retired, not classified (Ret) |
| Red | Did not qualify (DNQ) |
| Red | Did not pre-qualify (DNPQ) |
| Black | Disqualified (DSQ) |
| White | Did not start (DNS) |
| White | Withdrew (WD) |
| White | Race cancelled (C) |
| Blank | Did not practice (DNP) |
| Blank | Did not arrive (DNA) |
| Blank | Excluded (EX) |

Note: The driver gaining pole position at each round is indicated in bold text
