= 2026 in international kart racing =

65th season of international kart racing

2026 is the 65th season of international kart racing since the founding of the Commission Internationale de Karting (CIK-FIA) in 1962. The season is scheduled to see drivers and manufacturers contest 37 international championships in 11 CIK-FIA classes, (Note: The 2026 calendar has featured 37 international championships from 14 competitions in 11 CIK-FIA classes: CIK-FIA World Championship; CIK-FIA World Cup; CIK-FIA International Super Cup; CIK-FIA European Championship; CIK-FIA Asia-Pacific Championship; CIK-FIA South American Championship; CIK-FIA Academy Trophy; WSK Final Cup; WSK Euro Series; WSK Super Master Series; Champions of the Future Euro Series; Champions of the Future Academy Program; Andrea Margutti Trophy; and; Trofeo delle Industrie.) as well as 18 in the Rotax Max Challenge (RMC) and four in the IAME Series, across 54 events in 18 countries. The CIK-FIA World Championship is set to be held in three classes: OK, OK-J, and KZ.

The season is set to see the return of the CIK-FIA Asia-Pacific Championship and the CIK-FIA South American Championship in the arrive-and-drive classes, as well as the creation of a new CIK-FIA European Championship. The CIK-FIA season opened with the WSK Super Master Series on 21 January and is due to conclude with the final round of the Champions of the Future Academy Program in OK-N and OKN-J on 2 December.

The CIK-FIA European Champions were Émilien Denner (KZ) and Kimi Tani (KZ2). In the CIK-FIA classes, Maksim Orlov has won two titles in KZ2, while Lev Krutogolov (OK), Qarrar Firhand (OK), Antônio Pizzonia Neto (OK-J), Zdeněk Bábíček (OK-J), and Émilien Denner (KZ) have each won one title in their respective categories. In the RMC, Antoine Barbaroux (DD2), Macauley Bishop (Senior Max), and Bábíček (Junior Max) have each won titles; in the IAME Series, Aaron García (X30-S) and Ivan González (X30-J) have been victorious.

== Background ==
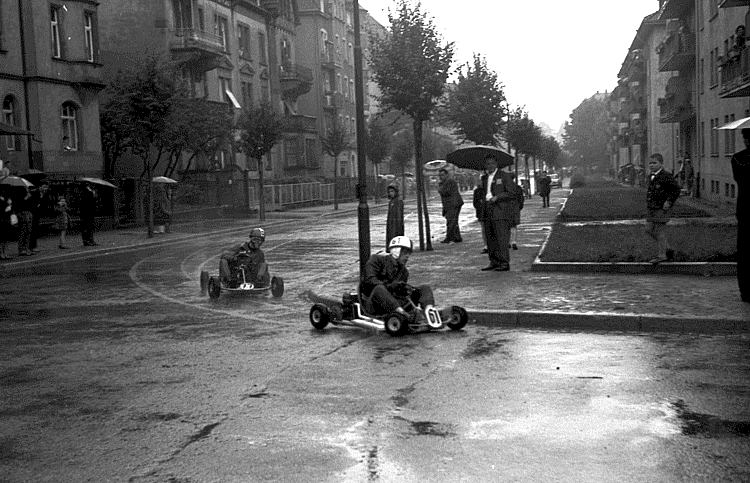
International kart racing was established in the early 1960s, with the creation of the Commission Internationale de Karting.

Kart racing originated on the streets of California, United States, in 1956. The Commission Internationale de Karting (CIK-FIA) was founded in 1962 to govern international kart racing. It soon founded the World Championship (1964), the European Championship (1970), and the Asian Open Championship (1976)—later known as the Asia-Pacific Championship—before establishing distinct engine classes in 1981. The CIK-FIA Academy Trophy was set up as a low-cost junior series in 2010. The World Championship was expanded to a three-class system in 2013, with separate titles for senior, junior, and gearbox classes. It is traditionally held as a single event, following the multi-round European Championship.

Parma Motorsport was founded in 1961 and has since established two international competitions: the Trofeo delle Industrie (1971) and the Andrea Margutti Trophy (1990). WSK Promotion was founded in 2006, later founding the Super Master Series, the Euro Series, and the Final Cup, all in 2010. The RGMMC Group created Champions of the Future in 2020, which since expanded to three distinct competitions: the Euro Series (2020), the Academy Program (2023), and Shifters (2024). The Rotax Max Challenge (RMC; 2000) and the IAME Series (2007) gained prominence as single-design disciplines in the early-21st century, prompting the CIK-FIA to establish arrive-and-drive categories in 2025.

=== Calendar changes ===
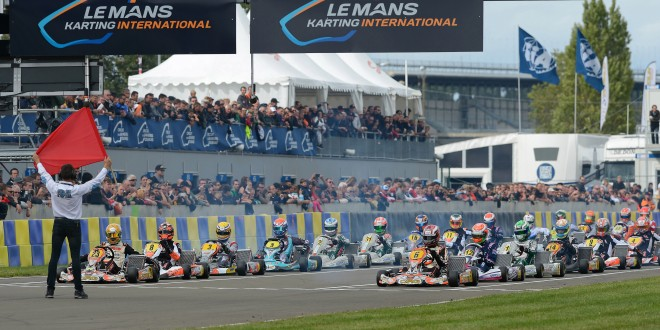
The KZ World Championship is due to return to Le Mans, pictured at the 2015 edition, for the third time.

After a decade-long absence, the CIK-FIA Asia-Pacific Championship was initially set to return in an arrive-and-drive format at three events in Macau, China, and India, alongside the CIK-FIA South American Championship in Brazil, which had not appeared since 2009. The Asia-Pacific Championship was later reduced to a single round in Macau. The CIK-FIA World Championship in OK and OK-J are set to return to Sakhir for the first time since 2016, while Le Mans is due to host the KZ World Championship for the third time. There are four circuits set to debut in international competition: Thessaloniki, Słomczyn, Imperatriz, and Muscat.

The Deutsche Kart-Meisterschaft (DKM) was removed from the international calendar, following the decision by ADAC to use the new national classes—OK-N and OKN-J—rather than the international OK and OK-J classes. The senior KZ2-Masters (KZ2-M) class was dropped from the European Championship, while Champions of the Future Shifters (COTFS) for all three gearbox classes was not held.

=== Manufacturer changes ===
Chinese technology firm Lenovo began a technical partnership with Kalì Kart, upgrading their facilities and starting a driver development programme, with their factory-backed outfit becoming the "Lenovo Kalì Kart Team".

=== Regulation changes ===
For 2026, the CIK-FIA mandated an "anti-launch" system, with the aim of mitigating the effects of wheel-to-wheel contact and overall safety, following its trial at the arrive-and-drive events in 2025. Initial tests showed that the system increases the dissipation of kinetic energy by over 60% relative to the previous rear bumper design, decreasing the risk of rollover collisions. The geometry of side bodywork was altered to accommodate the shields. Impact data recorders were mandated in CIK-FIA competitions ahead of their full debut in 2027, while the regulations regarding the geometry of front fairings were tightened to reduce water and gravel retention. A new safety seat insert was approved to protect drivers with physical disabilities, featuring a roll hoop.

As part of the FIA's broader commitment to net-zero emissions, fully-sustainable fuels were mandated across all FIA championships, including all CIK-FIA classes. Biofuel had been approved in CIK-FIA competition from 2023 onwards under Akbar Ebrahim. The CIK-FIA launched tenders for a fuel supplier in June 2025 and a biomass option by ETS Racing Fuels was selected by the FIA for each World Championship until 2028. In the June meeting of the World Motor Sport Council (WMSC), the regulations surrounding wet tyres were updated for "sporting fairness", requiring drivers to use a new set for races declared to be wet due to differing levels of degradation. Helmet regulations were revised to include options for drivers with a head circumference greater than 60 cm (24 in), as well as the rules surrounding tube inserts in rear axles.

== CIK-FIA classes ==
=== Calendar, CIK-FIA classes ===
As of 16 November 2026, the international calendar in CIK-FIA classes includes 35 events from 13 competitions with 34 titles on offer:

2026 CIK-FIA classes international calendar
| Championship | Circuit | Dates | Class | Winner |
January
| WSK Super Master Series (1/5) | (Italy) La Conca | 21–25 January | OK | (Ukraine) Lev Krutogolov |
| WSK Super Master Series (1/5) | (Italy) La Conca | 21–25 January | OK-J | (Brazil) Antônio Pizzonia Neto |
| WSK Super Master Series (1/5) | (Italy) La Conca | 21–25 January | KZ2 | Maksim Orlov |
February
| WSK Super Master Series (2/5) | (Italy) Sarno | 4–8 February | OK | (Netherlands) Dean Hoogendoorn |
| WSK Super Master Series (2/5) | (Italy) Sarno | 4–8 February | OK-J | (Czech Republic) Zdeněk Bábíček |
| WSK Super Master Series (2/5) | (Italy) Sarno | 4–8 February | KZ2 | (Netherlands) Senna van Walstijn |
| WSK Euro Series (1/3) | (Italy) Viterbo | 11–14 February | OK | (Indonesia) Qarrar Firhand |
| WSK Euro Series (1/3) | (Italy) Viterbo | 11–14 February | OK-J | (Italy) Michele Orlando |
| WSK Euro Series (1/3) | (Italy) Viterbo | 11–14 February | KZ2 | (Netherlands) Dion van Werven |
| WSK Super Master Series (3/5) | (Italy) Viterbo | 18–22 February | OK | (Ukraine) Lev Krutogolov |
| WSK Super Master Series (3/5) | (Italy) Viterbo | 18–22 February | OK-J | (Brazil) Antônio Pizzonia Neto |
| WSK Super Master Series (3/5) | (Italy) Viterbo | 18–22 February | KZ2 | (Netherlands) Senna van Walstijn |
March
| Champions of the Future Academy Program (1/5) | (Spain) Valencia | 26 February – 1 March | OK-N | (Spain) Angelina Simons |
| Champions of the Future Academy Program (1/5) | (Spain) Valencia | 26 February – 1 March | OK-N | (Poland) Kacper Rajpold |
| Champions of the Future Academy Program (1/5) | (Spain) Valencia | 26 February – 1 March | OKN-J | (Spain) Hernán Rodriguez |
| Champions of the Future Academy Program (1/5) | (Spain) Valencia | 26 February – 1 March | OKN-J | (Switzerland) Zoltan Coigny |
| WSK Super Master Series (4/5) | (Italy) Lonato | 4–8 March | OK | (Spain) Benjamin Mañach |
| WSK Super Master Series (4/5) | (Italy) Lonato | 4–8 March | OK-J | (Netherlands) Daniel Mirón |
| WSK Super Master Series (4/5) | (Italy) Lonato | 4–8 March | KZ2 | Maksim Orlov |
| Andrea Margutti Trophy | (Italy) Lonato | 12–15 March | KZ2 | (Italy) Cristian Bertuca |
| WSK Super Master Series (5/5) | (Italy) Franciacorta | 19–22 March | OK | (Germany) Luke Kornder |
| WSK Super Master Series (5/5) | (Italy) Franciacorta | 19–22 March | OK-J | (Italy) Lorenzo Di Pietrantonio |
| WSK Super Master Series (5/5) | (Italy) Franciacorta | 19–22 March | KZ2 | (Netherlands) Senna van Walstijn |
April
| Champions of the Future Euro Series (1/5) | (Italy) La Conca | 1–4 April | OK | (Netherlands) Dean Hoogendoorn |
| Champions of the Future Euro Series (1/5) | (Italy) La Conca | 1–4 April | OK-J | (Italy) Julian Frasnelli |
| CIK-FIA European Championship (1/4) | (Italy) La Conca | 9–12 April | OK | (United Kingdom) Noah Baglin |
| CIK-FIA European Championship (1/4) | (Italy) La Conca | 9–12 April | OK-J | (United Kingdom) Will Green |
| WSK Euro Series (2/3) | (Italy) Lonato | 15–18 April | OK | (Turkey) İskender Zülfikari |
| WSK Euro Series (2/3) | (Italy) Lonato | 15–18 April | OK-J | (Czech Republic) Zdeněk Bábíček |
| WSK Euro Series (2/3) | (Italy) Lonato | 15–18 April | KZ2 | Maksim Orlov |
May
| Champions of the Future Euro Series (2/5) | (Spain) Valencia | 29 April – 2 May | OK | (United Kingdom) Noah Baglin |
| Champions of the Future Euro Series (2/5) | (Spain) Valencia | 29 April – 2 May | OK-J | (United Kingdom) Will Green |
| CIK-FIA European Championship (2/4) | (Spain) Valencia | 7–10 May | OK | (United Kingdom) Noah Baglin |
| CIK-FIA European Championship (2/4) | (Spain) Valencia | 7–10 May | OK-J | (Spain) Daniel Mirón |
| CIK-FIA Academy Trophy (1/3) | (Spain) Valencia | 7–10 May | Academy-S | (Switzerland) Alexis Genolet |
| CIK-FIA European Championship (1/2) | (Belgium) Genk | 21–24 May | KZ | (Spain) Adrián Malheiro |
| CIK-FIA European Championship (1/2) | (Belgium) Genk | 21–24 May | KZ2 | (Belgium) Elie Goldstein |
| CIK-FIA Academy Trophy (1/3) | (Belgium) Genk | 21–24 May | Academy-J | (Switzerland) Zoltan Coigny |
| Champions of the Future Academy Program (2/5) | (Greece) Thessaloniki | 28–31 May | OK-N | (United Arab Emirates) Veer Chopra |
| Champions of the Future Academy Program (2/5) | (Greece) Thessaloniki | 28–31 May | OK-N | (United Arab Emirates) Veer Chopra |
| Champions of the Future Academy Program (2/5) | (Greece) Thessaloniki | 28–31 May | OKN-J | (Kosovo) Diar Islami |
| Champions of the Future Academy Program (2/5) | (Greece) Thessaloniki | 28–31 May | OKN-J | (India) Atiqa Mir |
June
| Champions of the Future Euro Series (3/5) | (Germany) Mülsen | 3–6 June | OK | (United Kingdom) Noah Baglin |
| Champions of the Future Euro Series (3/5) | (Germany) Mülsen | 3–6 June | OK-J | (Poland) Leo Górski |
| CIK-FIA European Championship (3/4) | (Germany) Mülsen | 11–14 June | OK | (United Kingdom) Zac Drummond |
| CIK-FIA European Championship (3/4) | (Germany) Mülsen | 11–14 June | OK-J | (United Kingdom) Will Green |
| CIK-FIA Academy Trophy (2/3) | (Germany) Mülsen | 11–14 June | Academy-S | (Czech Republic) Filip Planeta |
July
| CIK-FIA European Championship (2/2) | (Italy) Sarno | 2–5 July | KZ | (France) Émilien Denner |
| CIK-FIA European Championship (2/2) | (Italy) Sarno | 2–5 July | KZ2 | (Finland) Kimi Tani |
| CIK-FIA Academy Trophy (2/3) | (Italy) Sarno | 2–5 July | Academy-J | (Hong Kong) John Han |
| WSK Euro Series (3/3) | (Italy) Cremona | 8–11 July | OK | (United Kingdom) Henry Domain |
| WSK Euro Series (3/3) | (Italy) Cremona | 8–11 July | OK-J | Matvei Dergunov |
| WSK Euro Series (3/3) | (Italy) Cremona | 8–11 July | KZ2 | Maksim Orlov |
| Champions of the Future Academy Program (3/5) | (Italy) Viterbo | 9–12 July | OK-N | (India) Jagrat Detroja |
| Champions of the Future Academy Program (3/5) | (Italy) Viterbo | 9–12 July | OK-N | (Poland) Michał Zając |
| Champions of the Future Academy Program (3/5) | (Italy) Viterbo | 9–12 July | OKN-J | (Italy) Niccolò Perico |
| Champions of the Future Academy Program (3/5) | (Italy) Viterbo | 9–12 July | OKN-J | (Italy) Niccolò Perico |
| CIK-FIA European Championship | (Poland) Słomczyn | 17–19 July | A&D-S | (Poland) Kacper Turoboyski |
| CIK-FIA European Championship | (Poland) Słomczyn | 17–19 July | A&D-J | (Poland) Maksymilian Piątek |
| Champions of the Future Euro Series (4/5) | (Sweden) Kristianstad | 22–25 July | OK | (United Kingdom) Noah Baglin |
| Champions of the Future Euro Series (4/5) | (Sweden) Kristianstad | 22–25 July | OK-J | (Netherlands) Daniel Mirón |
August
| CIK-FIA European Championship (4/4) | (Sweden) Kristianstad | 30 July – 2 August | OK | (Australia) William Calleja |
| CIK-FIA European Championship (4/4) | (Sweden) Kristianstad | 30 July – 2 August | OK-J | (United Kingdom) Emerson MacAndrew-Uren |
| CIK-FIA Academy Trophy (3/3) | (Sweden) Kristianstad | 30 July – 2 August | Academy-S | (United Kingdom) Albert Lapper |
| WSK Final Cup (1/3) | (Italy) Franciacorta | 26–30 August | OK | (Ukraine) Lev Krutogolov |
| WSK Final Cup (1/3) | (Italy) Franciacorta | 26–30 August | OK-J | (Italy) Niccolò Perico |
September
| Champions of the Future Academy Program (4/5) | (Spain) Aspar | 4–6 September | OK-N | (United Arab Emirates) Veer Chopra |
| Champions of the Future Academy Program (4/5) | (Spain) Aspar | 4–6 September | OK-N | (Spain) Sebastian Verger |
| Champions of the Future Academy Program (4/5) | (Spain) Aspar | 4–6 September | OKN-J | (United Arab Emirates) Mitansh Jain |
| Champions of the Future Academy Program (4/5) | (Spain) Aspar | 4–6 September | OKN-J | (Philippines) Axel Nocom |
| Champions of the Future Euro Series (5/5) | (Italy) Sarno | 9–12 September | OK | (United Kingdom) Noah Baglin |
| Champions of the Future Euro Series (5/5) | (Italy) Sarno | 9–12 September | OK-J | (Netherlands) Daniel Mirón |
| CIK-FIA Asia-Pacific Championship | (Macau) Coloane | 11–13 September | A&D-S | (Denmark) Signe Pejs Ørnbøll |
| CIK-FIA Asia-Pacific Championship | (Macau) Coloane | 11–13 September | A&D-J | (Hong Kong) John Han |
| CIK-FIA World Championship | (France) Le Mans | 17–20 September | KZ | (Sweden) Viktor Gustavsson |
| CIK-FIA World Cup | (France) Le Mans | 17–20 September | KZ2 | (Estonia) Markus Kajak |
| CIK-FIA International Super Cup | (France) Le Mans | 17–20 September | KZ2-M | (France) Anthony Abbasse |
October
| CIK-FIA World Cup | (Italy) Viterbo | 8–11 October | OK-N | (Brazil) Yuri Morelli |
| CIK-FIA World Cup | (Italy) Viterbo | 8–11 October | OKN-J | (Italy) Niccolò Perico |
| CIK-FIA Academy Trophy (3/3) | (Italy) Viterbo | 8–11 October | Academy-J | (Finland) Max Sulin |
November
| CIK-FIA World Championship | (Italy) La Conca | 5–8 November | OK | (Netherlands) Dean Hoogendoorn |
| CIK-FIA World Championship | (Italy) La Conca | 5–8 November | OK-J | (Belgium) Antoine Sylva Venant |
| Trofeo delle Industrie | (Italy) Lonato | 12–15 November | KZ2 | (Italy) Cristian Bertuca |
| Champions of the Future Academy Program (5/5) | (Italy) Franciacorta | 13–15 November | OK-N | (Poland) Michał Zając |
| Champions of the Future Academy Program (5/5) | (Italy) Franciacorta | 13–15 November | OK-N | (United Arab Emirates) Veer Chopra |
| Champions of the Future Academy Program (5/5) | (Italy) Franciacorta | 13–15 November | OKN-J | (Switzerland) Jamie Ehrat |
| Champions of the Future Academy Program (5/5) | (Italy) Franciacorta | 13–15 November | OKN-J | (Germany) Devin Titz |
| CIK-FIA World Cup | (Malaysia) LYL International | 19–22 November | A&D-S | (Poland) Łukasz Jezierski |
| CIK-FIA World Cup | (Malaysia) LYL International | 19–22 November | A&D-J | (China) Liu Bowen |
| WSK Final Cup (2/3) | (Italy) Lonato | 19–22 November | OK | (Austria) Niklas Schaufler |
| WSK Final Cup (2/3) | (Italy) Lonato | 19–22 November | OK-J | (United Kingdom) Emerson MacAndrew-Uren |
| WSK Final Cup (1/2) | (Italy) Lonato | 19–22 November | KZ2 | (United Kingdom) Jenson Graham |
| WSK Final Cup (3/3) | (Italy) Viterbo | 25–29 November | OK | To be determined |
| WSK Final Cup (3/3) | (Italy) Viterbo | 25–29 November | OK-J | To be determined |
| WSK Final Cup (2/2) | (Italy) Viterbo | 25–29 November | KZ2 | To be determined |

=== OK ===
2026 is the 11th season of Original Kart (OK) regulations since they replaced KF in 2016 and the 46th season of senior engine regulations since the Formula K (FK) and Intercontinental A (ICA) classes were established in 1981, developed from the original 100 cc category from 1962. It is scheduled to be held across 21 events in six competitions.

==== Palmarès, OK ====
The OK class is set to award six international titles in 2026:

- WSK Super Master Series: (Ukraine) Lev Krutogolov (Energy–IAME)
- WSK Euro Series: (Indonesia) Qarrar Firhand (Parolin–TM)
- CIK-FIA European Championship: (United Kingdom) Noah Baglin (KR–IAME)
- Champions of the Future Euro Series: (United Kingdom) Noah Baglin (KR–IAME)
- CIK-FIA World Championship: (Netherlands) Dean Hoogendoorn (Parolin–TM)
- WSK Final Cup: To be determined

=== OK-Junior ===
2026 is the 11th season of OK-Junior (OK-J) regulations since they replaced KF-Junior (KF-J) in 2016 and the 46th season of junior engine regulations since the Junior Intercontinental A (ICA-J) class was established in 1981, developed from the original 100 cc category from 1968. It is scheduled to be held across 21 events in six competitions.

==== Palmarès, OK-Junior ====
The OK-J class is set to award six international titles in 2026:

- WSK Super Master Series: (Brazil) Antônio Pizzonia Neto (Parolin–TM)
- WSK Euro Series: (Czech Republic) Zdeněk Bábíček (Tony Kart–IAME)
- CIK-FIA European Championship: (United Kingdom) Will Green (KR–IAME)
- Champions of the Future Euro Series: (Netherlands) Daniel Mirón (KR–IAME)
- CIK-FIA World Championship: (Belgium) Antoine Sylva Venant (KR–IAME)
- WSK Final Cup: To be determined

=== KZ ===
2026 was the 20th season of KZ regulations since they replaced Formula C (FC) in 2007 and the 53rd season of gearbox regulations since the FC class was established in 1974. It was held across three events in two competitions.

==== Palmarès, KZ ====
The KZ class awarded two international titles in 2026:

- CIK-FIA European Championship: (France) Émilien Denner (IPK–TM)
- CIK-FIA World Championship: (Sweden) Viktor Gustavsson (CRG–TM)

=== KZ2 ===
2026 is the 20th season of KZ2 regulations since they replaced Intercontinental C (ICC) in 2007 and the 45th season of secondary gearbox regulations since the ICC class was established in 1982. It is scheduled to be held across 15 events in seven competitions.

==== Palmarès, KZ2 ====
The KZ2 class is set to award seven international titles in 2026:

- Andrea Margutti Trophy: (Italy) Cristian Bertuca (Birel ART–IAME)
- WSK Super Master Series: Maksim Orlov (Sodi–TM)
- CIK-FIA European Championship: (Finland) Kimi Tani (Parolin–TM)
- WSK Euro Series: Maksim Orlov (Sodi–TM)
- CIK-FIA World Cup: (Estonia) Markus Kajak (IPK–TM)
- Trofeo delle Industrie: (Italy) Cristian Bertuca (Tony Kart–TM)
- WSK Final Cup: To be determined

=== KZ2-Masters ===
2026 was the fifth season of KZ2-Masters (KZ2-M) since it was introduced as the gearbox class for drivers aged 35 and over at the CIK-FIA World Cup in 2022. It was held at one event.

==== Palmarès, KZ2-Masters ====
The KZ2-M class awarded one international title in 2026:

- CIK-FIA International Super Cup: (France) Anthony Abbasse (Sodi–TM)

=== OK-National ===
2026 was the fourth season of OK-National (OK-N) since it was introduced as a secondary senior class in 2023. It was held across six events in two competitions.

==== Palmarès, OK-National ====
The OK-N class awarded two international titles in 2026:

- CIK-FIA World Cup: (Brazil) Yuri Morelli (CRG–TM)
- Champions of the Future Academy Program: (Poland) Michał Zając (KR–IAME)

=== OKN-Junior ===
2026 was the fourth season of OKN-Junior (OKN-J) since it was introduced as a secondary junior class in 2023. It was held across six events in two competitions.

==== Palmarès, OKN-Junior ====
The OKN-J class awarded two international titles in 2026:

- CIK-FIA World Cup: (Italy) Niccolò Perico (KR–IAME)
- Champions of the Future Academy Program: (Switzerland) Zoltan Coigny (KR–IAME)

=== Arrive-and-drive ===
2026 was the second season of arrive-and-drive (A&D) regulations since they were created for the CIK-FIA World Cup in 2025. The Senior (A&D-S) and Junior (A&D-J) classes were held across three events in three competitions.

==== Palmarès, Arrive-and-drive ====
The A&D classes awarded six international titles in 2026:

- CIK-FIA European Championship: (Poland) Kacper Turoboyski (A&D-S) / (Poland) Maksymilian Piątek (A&D-J)
- CIK-FIA Asia-Pacific Championship: (Denmark) Signe Pejs Ørnbøll (A&D-S) / (Hong Kong) John Han (A&D-J)
- CIK-FIA World Cup: (Poland) Łukasz Jezierski (A&D-S) / (China) Liu Bowen (A&D-J)

== CIK-FIA World Championship ==
The 2026 Mondokart.com FIA Karting World Championship was the 63rd edition of the CIK-FIA World Championship, a kart racing competition organised and sanctioned by the Commission Internationale de Karting (CIK-FIA). The World Championship was held in three open classes—OK, OK-J, and KZ—with a World Cup in KZ2, OK-N, and OKN-J, as well as an International Super Cup in KZ2-M. The World Cup was also held in two arrive-and-drive classes: Senior (A&D-S) and Junior (A&D-J).

=== CIK-FIA World Champions ===
The CIK-FIA awarded three World Championships in 2026:

- OK: (Netherlands) Dean Hoogendoorn (Parolin–TM)
- OK-J: (Belgium) Antoine Sylva Venant (KR–IAME)
- KZ: (Sweden) Viktor Gustavsson (CRG–TM)

=== Palmarès, CIK-FIA World Cup ===
The CIK-FIA awarded five World Cups in 2026:

- KZ2: (Estonia) Markus Kajak (IPK–TM)
- OK-N: (Brazil) Yuri Morelli (CRG–TM)
- OKN-J: (Italy) Niccolò Perico (KR–IAME)
- A&D-S: (Poland) Łukasz Jezierski (Kosmic–Vortex)
- A&D-J: (China) Liu Bowen (Kosmic–Vortex)

=== Palmarès, CIK-FIA International Super Cup ===
The CIK-FIA awarded one International Super Cup in 2026:

- KZ2-M: (France) Anthony Abbasse (Sodi–TM)

== CIK-FIA European Championship ==
The 2026 Mondokart.com FIA Karting European Championship was the 57th edition of the CIK-FIA European Championship, a kart racing competition organised and sanctioned by the Commission Internationale de Karting (CIK-FIA). The European Championship was held in four open classes—OK, OK-J, KZ, and KZ2—as well as two arrive-and-drive classes: Senior (A&D-S) and Junior (A&D-J).

OK and OK-J were held across four rounds between 9 April and 2 August at La Conca, Italy; Valencia, Spain; Mülsen, Germany; and Kristianstad, Sweden. KZ and KZ2 were held across two rounds between 21 May and 5 July at Genk, Belgium; and Sarno, Italy. The inaugural arrive-and-drive European Championship was held in A&D-S and A&D-J on 17–19 July at Słomczyn, Poland—the international debut for the circuit.

=== CIK-FIA European Champions ===
The CIK-FIA awarded six European Championships in 2026:

- OK: (United Kingdom) Noah Baglin (KR–IAME)
- OK-J: (United Kingdom) Will Green (KR–IAME)
- KZ: (France) Émilien Denner (IPK–TM)
- KZ2: (Finland) Kimi Tani (Parolin–TM)
- A&D-S: (Poland) Kacper Turoboyski (Kosmic–Vortex)
- A&D-J: (Poland) Maksymilian Piątek (Kosmic–Vortex)

== Results key ==
| Colour | Result |
|---|---|
| Gold | Winner |
| Silver | Second place |
| Bronze | Third place |
| Green | Top-10 points finish |
| Sky blue | Other points finish |
| Blue | Non-points finish |
| Blue | Non-classified finish (NC) |
| Purple | Retired (Ret) |
| Red | Did not qualify (DNQ) |
| Red | Did not pre-qualify (DNPQ) |
| Black | Disqualified (DSQ) |
| White | Did not start (DNS) |
| White | Withdrew (WD) |
| White | Race cancelled (C) |
| Blank | Did not practice (DNP) |
| Blank | Did not arrive (DNA) |
| Blank | Excluded (EX) |

| Symbol | Meaning |
|---|---|
| P | Pole position |
| F | Fastest lap |
| † | Did not finish, but was classified. |

== Andrea Margutti Trophy ==
The 2026 Andrea Margutti Trophy (Italian: 37° Trofeo Andrea Margutti) was the 37th edition of the Andrea Margutti Trophy, a kart racing competition organised by Parma Motorsport and sanctioned by ACI Sport. The event was held on 12–15 March at Lonato, Italy, in five classes: KZ2, OK-N, OKN-J, Mini Gr.3, and Mini U10. The OK-J class was cancelled for the first time since 2021.

The entry list included 282 drivers from 37 nationalities. Initially a dry weekend, rain began to fall during the OK-N final, further affecting the KZ2 showpiece. Cristian Bertuca (Birel ART–IAME) won his third Andrea Margutti Trophy in KZ2, ahead of 51-year-old, four-time World Champion Davide Forè. The non-international winners were Nicolas Marchesi (OK-N), Gioele Carrer (OKN-J), Alfie Mair (Mini Gr.3), and Zayne Burgess (Mini U10).

=== International results, Andrea Margutti Trophy ===
The top-10 results of each international class held at the Andrea Margutti Trophy:

2026 Andrea Margutti Trophy KZ2 final
| Pos | # | Driver | Chassis | Engine | Tyres | Laps | Time/Retired | Grid |
|---|---|---|---|---|---|---|---|---|
| 1 | 101 | (Italy) Cristian Bertuca | Birel ART | IAME | V | 20 | 21:04.324^{1} | 1 |
| 2 | 117 | (Italy) Davide Forè | IPK | TM | V | 20 | +6.348 | 8 |
| 3 | 124 | (Italy) Marco Tormen | Pantano | TM | V | 20 | +8.354 | 4 |
| 4 | 149 | (Germany) Daniel Stell | Birel ART | TM | V | 20 | +20.498 | 22 |
| 5 | 145 | (Italy) Alex Maragliano | Birel ART | TM | V | 20 | +23.938 | 2 |
| 6 | 136 | (Italy) Alessio Piccini | Parolin | TM | V | 20 | +25.103 | 12 |
| 7 | 144 | (Italy) Andrea Dalè | CRG | TM | V | 20 | +25.579 | 5 |
| 8 | 114 | (Belgium) Elie Goldstein | TB | TM | V | 20 | +31.887 | 3 |
| 9 | 161 | (Netherlands) Jens Treur | Croc | TM | V | 20 | +32.433 | 7 |
| 10 | 122 | (Switzerland) Ethan Frigomosca | Sodi | TM | V | 20 | +37.996^{2} | 9 |

Tyres key
| B | Bridgestone | L | LeCont |
| C | Carlisle | M | Maxxis |
| D | Dunlop | M | MG Tires |
| G | Goodyear | M | Mojo |
| K | Komet | V | Vega |

Notes
- Fastest lap: (Italy) Cristian Bertuca (Birel ART–IAME) – 1:01.971 (lap 6)
- ^1 – Cristian Bertuca received a five-second time penalty for a start-procedure infringement, which did not affect his finishing position.
- ^2 – Ethan Frigomosca received a five-second time penalty for front fairing irregularities, which did not affect his finishing position.

=== Palmarès, Andrea Margutti Trophy ===
The Andrea Margutti Trophy awarded five titles in 2026, one of which was recognised as international by the CIK-FIA:

- KZ2: (Italy) Cristian Bertuca (Birel ART–IAME)
- OK-N: (Italy) Nicolas Marchesi† (KR–TM)
- OKN-J: (Italy) Gioele Carrer† (EKS–Modena)
- Mini Gr.3: (United Kingdom) Alfie Mair† (Tony Kart–Vortex)
- Mini U10: (Italy) Zayne Burgess (Note: Zayne Burgess is American and Jamaican but competed under an Italian licence.)† (Parolin–LKE)

^{†} Non-international title.

== WSK Super Master Series ==
The 2026 WSK Super Master Series was the 17th edition of the WSK Super Master Series, a kart racing competition organised by WSK Promotion and sanctioned by ACI Sport. The series was held across five rounds between 21 January and 22 March at five Italian circuits—La Conca, Sarno, Viterbo, Franciacorta, and Lonato—in six classes: OK, OK-J, KZ2, OKN-J, Mini Gr.3, and Mini U10. The La Conca round served as the season-opening event in CIK-FIA classes.

The series was contested by 550 drivers from 60 nationalities, with a single-round peak of 375 at Lonato. The pre-season test at La Conca was attended by Formula One driver and 2019 OK-J champion Andrea Kimi Antonelli, who was third-fastest in KZ2. Ukrainian driver Lev Krutogolov won his maiden international title in OK by 74 points over Zac Drummond. Antônio Pizzonia Neto of Brazil—the son of former Formula One driver Antônio Pizzonia—scored his second title in OK-J, having won the Trofeo delle Industrie in 2025, after dominating the La Conca and Viterbo weekends. Reigning World Cup winner and European Champion Maksim Orlov held off a late charge from KZ World Champion Senna van Walstijn to clinch his sixth international title in KZ2 since 2024.

Non-international champions included Italian prodigy Niccolò Perico (OKN-J), Maltese talent Zane Pace (Mini Gr.3), and American prospect Zayne Burgess (Mini U10).

=== International results, WSK Super Master Series ===
The top-10 results of each international class held at the WSK Super Master Series:

2026 WSK Super Master Series standings
| Pos | Driver | LAC (Italy) | | | | SAR (Italy) | | | | VIT (Italy) | | | | FRN (Italy) | | | | LON (Italy) | | | | Points |
| Pos | Driver | QH | PA | PB | F | QH | PA | PB | F | QH | PA | PB | F | QH | PA | PB | F | QH | PA | PB | F | Points |
OK
| 1 | (Ukraine) Lev Krutogolov | 5 | 1 | | 1 | 15 | 3^{F} | | 5 | 1 | 1^{P}^{F} | | 1^{P}^{F} | 4 | | 32† | 3 | 8 | | 1^{F} | 4 | 419 |
| 2 | (United Kingdom) Zac Drummond | 3^{P} | 2 | | 2 | 1 | 1^{P} | | 14^{P} | 4 | | 2 | 2 | 33 | 4 | | 7 | 10 | | 2 | 6 | 345 |
| 3 | (Spain) Benjamin Mañach | 15 | 33† | | 32 | 12 | | 4 | 8 | 6 | | 3 | 7 | 6 | | 1 | 1 | 5 | 2 | | 7 | 308 |
| 4 | (Germany) Luke Kornder | 51 | 14 | | DNQ | 2 | | 3^{P} | 7 | 2 | | 1^{P} | 8 | 5 | 30† | | 20 | 1 | 1^{P} | | 1^{P} | 276 |
| 5 | (Czech Republic) Jindřich Pešl | 4 | | 1 | 3^{P} | 4^{P} | | 1 | 3 | 25 | 11 | | 16 | 3 | 2 | | 4 | 21 | 5 | | 21 | 264 |
| 6 | (Netherlands) Dean Hoogendoorn | 6 | | 3^{F} | 7 | 6 | | 2 | 1 | 11 | 3 | | 5 | 23 | 31† | | 19 | 11^{P} | 15 | | 5 | 219 |
| 7 | (Australia) William Calleja | 8 | | 30† | 9 | 26 | | 6 | 35† | 10 | | 4^{F} | 3 | 1 | 1^{P}^{F} | | 33†^{P}^{F} | 19 | 7^{F} | | 13^{F} | 172 |
| 8 | (Indonesia) Qarrar Firhand | 9 | 7 | | 17 | 24 | | 12 | 34† | 22 | | 9 | 11 | 18 | | 4 | 10 | 3 | 4 | | 2 | 168 |
| 9 | (United States) Devin Walz | 75 | DNQ | | DNPQ | 35 | 10 | | 19 | 5 | 2 | | 14 | 8^{P} | | 2^{F} | 32† | 18 | | 4 | 12 | 152 |
| 10 | (Monaco) Andréa Manni | 7 | 32† | | 11 | 9 | 5 | | 9 | 12 | | 7 | 12 | 7 | 5 | | 5 | 12 | | 5 | 8 | 150 |
OK-J
| 1 | (Brazil) Antônio Pizzonia Neto | 1 | 1^{P}^{F} | | 1^{P}^{F} | 40 | | 17 | 17 | 1^{P} | 1^{P} | | 1^{P} | 14 | | 1^{F} | 9 | 4 | | 8 | 27 | 317 |
| 2 | (United Kingdom) Will Green | 3 | 6 | | 3 | 3^{P} | 3 | | 9 | 4 | | 4 | 6 | 6 | | 2 | 10 | 21 | 5 | | 2^{F} | 271 |
| 3 | (Netherlands) Daniel Mirón | 17 | 34† | | 15 | 1 | 5^{P} | | 3^{P} | 2 | | 1^{P} | 3 | 1^{P} | 19^{P}^{F} | | 1 | 8 | | 27† | 28† | 251 |
| 4 | (United Kingdom) Jarlath Sayer | 26 | | 34† | DNQ | 7 | 4 | | 4 | 6 | | 2 | 2 | 8 | | 5 | 28† | 16 | | 3 | 6 | 229 |
| 5 | (Italy) Lorenzo Di Pietrantonio | 13^{P} | 13 | | 20 | 34 | | 30 | DNQ | 58 | | 34 | DNQ | 10 | | 3 | 6 | 2^{P} | | 2^{P} | 1^{P} | 217 |
| 6 | (Italy) Gioele Girardello | 18 | | 3 | 13 | 8 | | 6 | 5^{F} | 18 | | 31† | 19 | 4 | | 4 | 3 | 3 | 3 | | 20 | 182 |
| 7 | (Czech Republic) Zdeněk Bábíček | 42 | | 35† | DNQ | 2 | | 2^{P} | 1 | 20 | | 7 | 10 | 12 | | 12 | 5 | 24 | | 14 | 16 | 169 |
| 8 | Matvei Dergunov | | | | | | | | | | | | | 3 | 10 | | 2^{F} | 11 | 1 | | 8 | 161 |
| 9 | (Belgium) Henri-Constant Kumpen | 20 | | 8 | 30 | 12 | | 5 | 12 | 26 | | 8 | 21 | 2 | | 9^{P} | 4^{P} | 28 | | 5 | 5 | 142 |
| 10 | (United States) Alessandro Truchot | 11 | 2 | | 5 | 32 | | 21 | 24 | 13 | 8 | | 33 | 13 | 2 | | 7 | 12 | | 7 | 17 | 133 |
KZ2
| 1 | Maksim Orlov | 1 | 1^{P}^{F} | | 1^{P} | 12 | | 1 | 5 | 3^{P} | 2^{F} | | 2^{F} | 2 | | 1^{P}^{F} | 1^{F} | 12^{P} | | 1^{F} | 4 | 499 |
| 2 | (Netherlands) Senna van Walstijn | | | | | 1 | 28†^{P} | | 1 | 5 | 1 | | 1 | 1^{P} | 1^{P}^{F} | | 7^{P} | 2 | | 2^{P} | 1^{F} | 439 |
| 3 | (Czech Republic) Marek Skřivan | | | | | 8 | | 2^{F} | 2 | | | | | 4 | | 4 | 3 | 7 | 5 | | 7 | 216 |
| 4 | (Italy) Cristian Bertuca | | | | | 10 | | 7 | 35† | 1 | 5^{P} | | 3^{P} | 7 | 28† | | 18 | 1 | 1^{P} | | 5^{P} | 194 |
| 5 | (France) Émilien Denner | | | | | 33 | 6 | | 28† | | | | | 14 | | 3 | 5 | 4 | | 3 | 2 | 193 |
| 6 | (Italy) Danilo Albanese | | | | | 19 | 1 | | 15 | | | | | 3 | 2 | | 2 | 14 | | 5 | 13 | 191 |
| 7 | (Sweden) Viktor Gustavsson | | | | | 7 | 7 | | 34† | | | | | 6 | | 7 | 4 | 5 | 2 | | 11 | 139 |
| 8 | (Netherlands) Jayden Thien | 2 | 2 | | 2 | 23 | 3 | | 8 | 12 | 19† | | 6 | 23 | 13 | | 33† | 11 | 6 | | 19 | 133 |
| 9 | (Netherlands) Dion van Werven | 3^{P} | 3 | | 3 | 3 | 2 | | 10^{P} | 6 | 22† | | 5 | 25 | 11 | | 31† | 20 | | 7 | 31† | 132 |
| 10 | (Spain) Petro Hiltbrand | | | | | 9 | 5^{F} | | 6 | 11 | 3 | | 24† | 27 | 5 | | 20 | 9 | 4 | | 9 | 127 |

=== Palmarès, WSK Super Master Series ===
The WSK Super Master Series awarded six titles in 2026, three of which were recognised as international by the CIK-FIA:

- OK: (Ukraine) Lev Krutogolov (Energy–IAME)
- OK-J: (Brazil) Antônio Pizzonia Neto (Parolin–TM)
- KZ2: Maksim Orlov (Sodi–TM)
- OKN-J: (Italy) Niccolò Perico† (KR–IAME)
- Mini Gr.3: (Malta) Zane Pace† (Tony Kart–Vortex)
- Mini U10: (United States) Zayne Burgess† (Parolin–TM)

^{†} Non-international title.

== WSK Euro Series ==
The 2026 WSK Euro Series was the 17th and final edition of the WSK Euro Series, a kart racing competition organised by WSK Promotion and sanctioned by ACI Sport. The series was held across three rounds between 11 February and 11 July at three Italian circuits—Viterbo, Lonato, and Cremona—in seven classes: OK, OK-J, KZ2, OK-N, OKN-J, Mini Gr.3, and Mini U10.

The series was contested by an average of 260 drivers from 50 nationalities, down from 550 in the WSK Super Master Series. Qarrar Firhand won his maiden international title as the only driver to contest all rounds in the struggling OK class, becoming the first Indonesian international champion since Presley Martono in 2014. Zdeněk Bábíček dominated the OK-J division with a 124-point margin over Vsevolod Osadchyi-Suslovskyi. Maksim Orlov continued his dominance in KZ2, his seventh international title in the category and his second of the year.

Non-international champions included Andrea Giudice (OK-N), Elton Hedfors (OKN-J), Alfie Mair (Mini Gr.3), and Sasha Miras y Muñoz (Mini U10).

=== International results, WSK Euro Series ===
The top-10 results of each international class held at the WSK Euro Series:

2026 WSK Euro Series standings
| Pos | Driver | VIT (Italy) | | | | LON (Italy) | | | | CRE (Italy) | | | Points |
| Pos | Driver | QH | PA | PB | F | QH | PA | PB | F | QH | PF | F | Points |
OK
| 1 | (Indonesia) Qarrar Firhand | 1 | 1^{P} | | 1^{P}^{F} | 2 | 2 | | 2 | 1^{P} | 1^{P}^{F} | 2^{P}^{F} | 345 |
| 2 | (United Kingdom) Henry Domain | | | | | | | | | 2 | 2 | 1 | 142 |
| 3 | (Turkey) İskender Zülfikari | | | | | 3 | 1^{F} | | 1^{F} | | | | 130 |
| 4 | (Spain) Bosco Arias | 4 | 5 | | 3 | 1^{P} | 3^{P} | | 3^{P} | | | | 129 |
| 5 | (Germany) Luke Kornder | 2^{P} | 2 | | 5 | 4 | 5 | | 4 | | | | 109 |
| 6 | (Spain) Benjamin Mañach | 6 | 8 | | 2 | 6 | 4 | | 5 | | | | 104 |
| 7 | (Czech Republic) Martina Rumlenová | 8 | 4^{F} | | 9 | | | | | 3 | 3 | 6 | 103 |
| 8 | (Brazil) Francisco Rocha | | | | | | | | | 5 | 4 | 3 | 89 |
| 9 | (United States) Nicola Stanley | 9 | 6 | | 4 | 5 | 6 | | 6 | | | | 69 |
| 10 | (Poland) Ksawery Dudkowski | | | | | | | | | 6 | 5 | 5 | 63 |
OK-J
| 1 | (Czech Republic) Zdeněk Bábíček | 4 | | 2 | 7 | 1^{P} | 1^{P} | | 1^{P} | 7 | 2 | 2 | 297 |
| 2 | (Ukraine) Vsevolod Osadchyi-Suslovskyi | 9 | 2 | | 3 | 4 | 3 | | 15^{F} | 2 | 6 | 4 | 173 |
| 3 | (Poland) Leo Górski | 1 | 1^{P}^{F} | | 32†^{P} | 2 | 4 | | 2 | 9 | 20 | 5 | 172 |
| 4 | Matvei Dergunov | | | | | | | | | 1 | 1^{P} | 1^{P}^{F} | 153 |
| 5 | (Brazil) Antônio Pizzonia Neto | 16 | | 5 | 6 | 3 | 2 | | 3 | 11 | 8^{F} | 7 | 148 |
| 6 | (Slovakia) Alex Molota | 2 | | 1^{P}^{F} | 2 | 5 | 9 | | 6 | 13 | 12 | 11 | 141 |
| 7 | (Poland) Remigiusz Samczyk | 5 | 6 | | 33† | 10 | 8 | | 4 | 4 | 3 | 6 | 136 |
| 8 | (Italy) Michele Orlando | 6^{P} | | 3 | 1^{F} | 21 | 14 | | 21 | 20 | 15 | 19 | 92 |
| 9 | (United Kingdom) Austin Newstead | 19 | 8 | | 12 | 9 | 13 | | 5 | 10 | 4 | Ret | 77 |
| 10 | (France) Téo Pelfrene | 11 | 14 | | 17 | | | | | 14 | 7 | 3 | 61 |
KZ2
| 1 | Maksim Orlov | 1^{P} | 5^{P}^{F} | | 3^{P} | 6^{P} | | 1^{F} | 1^{F} | 1^{P} | 1^{P} | 1^{P} | 330 |
| 2 | (Netherlands) Dion van Werven | 2 | 2 | | 1^{F} | 29 | 3 | | 12 | 2 | 2 | 3 | 249 |
| 3 | (United Kingdom) Jenson Graham | 3 | 1 | | 2 | 15 | 10 | | 15 | 5 | 3^{F} | 4 | 188 |
| 4 | (China) Houzai Jiang | 4 | 4 | | 6 | 26 | | 9 | 22 | 6 | 7 | 2 | 115 |
| 5 | (Germany) Maximilian Schleimer | | | | | 3 | 1 | | 3 | | | | 100 |
| 6 | (Grenada) Mark Zvarich | 8 | 9 | | 7 | 20 | | 11 | 23 | 4 | 4 | 5 | 99 |
| 7 | (Italy) Matteo Viganò | | | | | 9 | 2 | | 5 | | | | 69 |
| 8 | (Netherlands) Senna van Walstijn | | | | | 1 | 14†^{P} | | 2 | | | | 64 |
| 9 | (Italy) Riccardo Longhi | | | | | 4 | | 5 | 4 | | | | 54 |
| 10 | (Italy) Luca Spagni | | | | | | | | | 3 | 6 | 7 | 51 |

=== Palmarès, WSK Euro Series ===
The WSK Euro Series awarded seven titles in 2026, three of which were recognised as international by the CIK-FIA:

- OK: (Indonesia) Qarrar Firhand (Parolin–TM)
- OK-J: (Czech Republic) Zdeněk Bábíček (Tony Kart–IAME)
- KZ2: Maksim Orlov (Sodi–TM)
- OK-N: (Italy) Andrea Giudice† (Tony Kart–Vortex)
- OKN-J: (Sweden) Elton Hedfors† (Parolin–TM)
- Mini Gr.3: (United Kingdom) Alfie Mair† (Tony Kart–Vortex)
- Mini U10: (France) Sasha Miras y Muñoz† (Parolin–IAME)

^{†} Non-international title.

== Champions of the Future Euro Series ==
The 2026 Champions of the Future Euro Series was the seventh edition of the Champions of the Future Euro Series, a kart racing competition organised by the RGMMC Group and sanctioned by the Commission Internationale de Karting (CIK-FIA). The series was held across five rounds between 1 April and 12 September at five European circuits—La Conca, Valencia, Mülsen, Kristianstad, and Sarno—in two classes: OK and OK-J. The opening four rounds took place the week before CIK-FIA European Championship events at the same venue.

The eventual European Champion, Noah Baglin, reaffirmed his dominance in the OK class by winning four consecutive finals, finishing his campaign 83 points ahead of Benjamin Mañach and 117 ahead of Zac Drummond. Daniel Mirón won the final round of OK-J to clinch his first international title, ahead of rival Will Green and Priam Bruno.

=== Results, Champions of the Future Euro Series ===
The top-10 results of each class held at the Champions of the Future Euro Series:

2026 Champions of the Future Euro Series standings
| Pos | Driver | LAC (Italy) | | | | VAL (Spain) | | | | MÜL (Germany) | | | | KRI (Sweden) | | | | SAR (Italy) | | | | Points |
| Pos | Driver | QH | SA | SB | F | QH | SA | SB | F | QH | SA | SB | F | QH | SA | SB | F | QH | SA | SB | F | Points |
OK
| 1 | (United Kingdom) Noah Baglin | 23 | (12) | | 31† | 8 | | 2^{F} | 1 | 3 | 5 | | 1^{F} | 6 | | 1 | 1 | 2^{P} | | 1^{P}^{F} | 1 | 351 |
| 2 | (Spain) Benjamin Mañach | 65 | (10) | | DNQ | 7 | 8 | | 4 | 2 | | 1^{P} | 2 | 1^{P} | 1^{P} | | 7^{P} | 5 | 2 | | 9 | 268 |
| 3 | (United Kingdom) Zac Drummond | 8 | | 2 | 8 | 3 | 2 | | 10 | 7 | 4 | | 4 | 10 | | 2 | 2 | 19 | (15) | | 16 | 234 |
| 4 | (Ukraine) Lev Krutogolov | 9 | 4 | | 3 | 10 | | 3 | 6 | 9 | 8 | | 5 | 19 | 16 | | (10) | 8 | | 3 | 2 | 231 |
| 5 | (Australia) James Anagnostiadis | 2 | | 1^{P}^{F} | 2 | 25 | 6 | | 8 | 1 | 3^{P} | | 3^{P} | 25 | 7 | | 9 | | | | | 229 |
| 6 | (United Kingdom) Henry Domain | (15) | 5 | | 33† | 14 | | (7) | 15 | 5 | 1 | | 6 | 2 | | 4^{P} | 3 | 4 | | 2 | 7 | 222 |
| 7 | (Netherlands) Dean Hoogendoorn | 3 | 2 | | 1 | 11 | 3 | | 7 | 11 | 6 | | 13 | 27 | (9) | | (14) | 10 | | 4 | 4 | 216 |
| 8 | (Italy) Filippo Sala | 25 | 6^{F} | | 7^{F} | 9 | 4 | | 9 | 27 | (12) | | (10) | 3 | 2 | | 6 | 7 | 3 | | 3 | 209 |
| 9 | (Australia) William Calleja | 40 | | 17 | 22 | 2 | | 1^{P} | 20 | 17 | 2 | | 16 | 12 | | 3 | 4 | 16 | | 12 | 13 | 134 |
| 10 | (Austria) Niklas Schaufler | 61 | 22 | | DNQ | 6 | | 4 | 2^{F} | 13 | 9 | | 14 | 24 | | 10 | 16 | 3 | 6 | | 11 | 133 |
OK-J
| 1 | (Netherlands) Daniel Mirón | 9 | 2 | | 3 | 47 | Ret | | DNQ | 1^{P} | 1^{P} | | 5^{P} | 4^{P} | | 6 | 1 | 1 | 2^{P} | | 1^{P} | 324 |
| 2 | (United Kingdom) Will Green | 4 | | 33† | (8) | 22 | | 1^{F} | 1^{F} | 3 | 2^{F} | | 4 | 9 | 6^{F} | | 5 | 8 | | 1 | 2 | 296 |
| 3 | (Belgium) Priam Bruno | 2 | | 2^{P} | 2 | 5^{P} | 2 | | 2 | 7 | 4 | | 26† | 10 | | 4 | 3 | 16 | | (8) | 9 | 272 |
| 4 | (Italy) Julian Frasnelli | 1 | 1^{P} | | 1^{P} | 14 | | 2 | 7 | 21 | DSQ | | 3 | 22 | | 16 | 32† | 15 | 7 | | 3 | 234 |
| 5 | (Poland) Leo Górski | 7 | 5 | | 4 | 20 | | 12 | 9 | 8 | | 5 | 1 | 1 | Ret^{P} | | 6 | 12^{P} | | 4 | 32† | 224 |
| 6 | (Italy) Antônio Pizzonia Neto | 26 | | (8) | 18 | 10 | | 6 | 5 | 6 | | 2 | 12 | 5 | 2 | | 2 | 3 | 5 | | 25† | 205 |
| 7 | (Italy) Niccolò Perico | 20 | | (15) | 32† | 4 | | 4 | 4 | 5 | 6 | | 10 | 16 | | 7 | 4 | 2 | | 2^{P} | 30† | 195 |
| 8 | (Italy) Gioele Girardello | 6 | | | 6 | 38 | | | DNQ | 11 | 10 | | Ret | 7 | Ret | | 7 | 5 | 3 | | 10 | 152 |
| 9 | (Czech Republic) Zdeněk Bábíček | 30 | | 6 | 11 | | | | | 2 | | 1^{P} | 2 | 54 | | 14 | DNQ | | | | | 114 |
| 10 | (Finland) Oskari Walle | 16 | | 10 | 12 | 1 | 5^{P} | | 3^{P} | 14 | | 6 | 29† | 12 | | 19 | 30† | 40 | | 16 | 14 | 111 |

=== Palmarès, Champions of the Future Euro Series ===
The Champions of the Future Euro Series awarded two international titles in 2026:

- OK: (United Kingdom) Noah Baglin (KR–IAME)
- OK-J: (Netherlands) Daniel Mirón (KR–IAME)

== CIK-FIA Asia-Pacific Championship ==
The 2026 FIA Karting Asia-Pacific Championship was the 41st edition of the CIK-FIA Asia-Pacific Championship, a kart racing competition organised and sanctioned by the Commission Internationale de Karting (CIK-FIA). The Asia-Pacific Championship was held on 11–13 September at Coloane, Macau, in both arrive-and-drive classes: Senior (A&D-S) and Junior (A&D-J).

The 2026 edition marked the first Asia-Pacific Championship in 10 years. It was initially set to be a three-round series at Coloane, Zhuzhou, and Madras, but was reduced to a single round due to the economic impact of the Iran War. Amelia Phillips—aiming to become the first female Asia-Pacific Champion—was denied the Senior title by a front-fairing penalty, handing the victory to Signe Pejs Ørnbøll. In the Junior division, John Han held off Knox Black to become the first international champion from Hong Kong in history.

=== Results, CIK-FIA Asia-Pacific Championship ===
The top-10 results of each class held at the CIK-FIA Asia-Pacific Championship:

2026 CIK-FIA Asia-Pacific Championship top-10 results
| Pos | # | Driver | Chassis | Engine | Tyres | Laps | Time/Retired | Grid |
Senior
| 1 | 4 | (Denmark) Signe Pejs Ørnbøll | Kosmic | Vortex | V | 21 | 19:41.706 | 2 |
| 2 | 17 | (Singapore) Conrad Garrow | Kosmic | Vortex | V | 21 | +2.889 | 13 |
| 3 | 23 | (New Zealand) Amelia Phillips | Kosmic | Vortex | V | 21 | +3.835^{1} | 6 |
| 4 | 8 | (Italy) Andrea Galimberti | Kosmic | Vortex | V | 21 | +7.675 | 1 |
| 5 | 2 | (Japan) Seira Kojima | Kosmic | Vortex | V | 21 | +7.815 | 5 |
| 6 | 24 | (Australia) Hugo Garraway | Kosmic | Vortex | V | 21 | +12.497^{2} | 4 |
| 7 | 16 | (Thailand) Nadol Imjitpanya | Kosmic | Vortex | V | 21 | +13.486 | 10 |
| 8 | 11 | (Macau) Vernice Lao | Kosmic | Vortex | V | 21 | +17.875 | 3 |
| 9 | 19 | (Bahrain) Vedant Menon | Kosmic | Vortex | V | 21 | +18.374 | 15 |
| 10 | 7 | (China) Jingyi Ouyang | Kosmic | Vortex | V | 21 | +21.516^{3} | 21 |
Junior
| 1 | 111 | (Hong Kong) John Han | Kosmic | Vortex | V | 17 | 13:38.020 | 1 |
| 2 | 105 | (Australia) Knox Black | Kosmic | Vortex | V | 17 | +0.719 | 3 |
| 3 | 112 | (China) Liu Bowen | Kosmic | Vortex | V | 17 | +2.241 | 7 |
| 4 | 118 | (India) Rivaan Dev Preetham | Kosmic | Vortex | V | 17 | +5.130 | 5 |
| 5 | 114 | (Hong Kong) Ka Hei Chong | Kosmic | Vortex | V | 17 | +8.691 | 9 |
| 6 | 113 | (China) Hanzhi Fu | Kosmic | Vortex | V | 17 | +9.707 | 20 |
| 7 | 106 | (Jamaica) Brandon Shor | Kosmic | Vortex | V | 17 | +10.275 | 17 |
| 8 | 120 | (Australia) Scarlett Pittam | Kosmic | Vortex | V | 17 | +11.810 | 6 |
| 9 | 107 | (China) Minghe Yu | Kosmic | Vortex | V | 17 | +13.669 | 16 |
| 10 | 108 | (Hong Kong) Mason Kwong | Kosmic | Vortex | V | 17 | +14.380^{4} | 4 |

Tyres key
| B | Bridgestone | L | LeCont |
| C | Carlisle | M | Maxxis |
| D | Dunlop | M | MG Tires |
| G | Goodyear | M | Mojo |
| K | Komet | V | Vega |

Notes
- Senior fastest lap: (New Zealand) Amelia Phillips (Kosmic–Vortex) – 53.341 (lap 19)
- Junior fastest lap: (Australia) Knox Black (Kosmic–Vortex) – 47.544 (lap 14)
- ^1 – Amelia Phillips finished first, but received a five-second time penalty for front fairing irregularities.
- ^2 – Hugo Garraway finished fourth, but received a five-second time penalty for front fairing irregularities.
- ^3 – Jingyi Ouyang received a five-second time penalty for front fairing irregularities.
- ^4 – Mason Kwong finished sixth, but received a five-second time penalty for causing a collision.

=== CIK-FIA Asia-Pacific Champions ===
The CIK-FIA awarded two Asia-Pacific Championships in 2026:

- A&D-S: (Denmark) Signe Pejs Ørnbøll (Kosmic–Vortex)
- A&D-J: (Hong Kong) John Han (Kosmic–Vortex)

== CIK-FIA Academy Trophy ==
The 2026 FIA Karting Academy Trophy was the 17th edition of the CIK-FIA Academy Trophy, a kart racing competition organised and sanctioned by the Commission Internationale de Karting (CIK-FIA). The series was held in both Academy classes: Academy-Senior and Academy-Junior.

Academy-Senior was held as support races to the OK and OK-J European Championships; it took place between 7 May and 2 August at Valencia, Spain; Mülsen, Germany; and Kristianstad, Sweden. Academy-Junior was held as support races to the European Championship, as well as the OK-N and OKN-J World Cups; it took place between 21 May and 11 October at Genk, Belgium; Sarno, Italy; and Viterbo, Italy.

Albert Lapper took podiums in every round to take the senior title by 77 points over Alexis Genolet and 87 over Filip Planeta. John Han followed his victory at the Asia-Pacific Championship with dominance in the junior class, not finishing lower than second as he took the title by 51 points over Domenico Coco and 99 over Takeru Shimbashi.

=== Results, Academy-Senior ===
The top-10 results of Academy-Senior at the Academy Trophy:

2026 CIK-FIA Academy Trophy Senior standings
| Pos | Driver | VAL (Spain) | | MÜL (Germany) | | KRI (Sweden) | | Points |
| Pos | Driver | QH | F | QH | F | QH | F | Points |
|---|---|---|---|---|---|---|---|---|
| 1 | (United Kingdom) Albert Lapper | 2 | 3 | 1 | 2^{P} | 3 | 1 | 198 |
| 2 | (Switzerland) Alexis Genolet | 1^{P} | 1^{P}^{F} | 5 | 11 | 2 | DSQ | 121 |
| 3 | (Czech Republic) Filip Planeta | 14 | 7 | 2 | 1 | 5 | 32† | 111 |
| 4 | (Italy) Alex Desario | 4 | 4 | 3 | 8 | 21 | 7^{F} | 111 |
| 5 | (Australia) Liam Carr | 8 | 5 | 6 | DSQ | 9 | 2 | 103 |
| 6 | (Poland) Michał Zając | 7 | 6 | 7 | 9^{F} | 1^{P} | 33†^{P} | 88 |
| 7 | (Argentina) José Bautista Delich | 31 | 15 | 9 | 4 | 8 | 6 | 77 |
| 8 | (Romania) Ioan Tudor Jercan | 9 | 22 | 4 | 34† | 4 | 4 | 75 |
| 9 | (Estonia) Oliver Kurg | 3 | 2 | 13 | 30† | 16 | 15 | 67 |
| 10 | (Lithuania) Vanesa Šilkūnaitė | 19 | 8 | 10 | 3 | 12 | 19 | 66 |

=== Results, Academy-Junior ===
The top-10 results of Academy-Junior at the Academy Trophy:

2026 CIK-FIA Academy Trophy Senior standings
| Pos | Driver | GEN (Belgium) | | SAR (Italy) | | VIT (Italy) | | Points |
| Pos | Driver | QH | F | QH | F | QH | F | Points |
|---|---|---|---|---|---|---|---|---|
| 1 | (Hong Kong) John Han | 2 | 2^{F} | 1^{P} | 1^{P} | 2 | 2 | 208 |
| 2 | (Italy) Domenico Coco | 5 | 6 | 3 | 2 | 3 | 4 | 157 |
| 3 | (Japan) Takeru Shimbashi | 6 | 5 | 6 | 21 | 5 | 3 | 109 |
| 4 | (Argentina) Joaquín Gorlero Pizarro | 18 | 9 | 11 | 7 | 1^{P} | 6^{P} | 92 |
| 5 | (Switzerland) Zoltan Coigny | 1^{P} | 1^{P} | 20 | 33† | 6 | 28† | 88 |
| 6 | (Finland) Max Sulin | 17 | 11 | 18 | 11 | 4 | 1 | 83 |
| 7 | (Sweden) Kevin Pentell | 8 | 3 | 29 | 12^{F} | 14 | 7 | 78 |
| 8 | (Czech Republic) Jindřich Svoboda | 14 | 18 | 10 | 3 | 9 | 8 | 71 |
| 9 | (Paraguay) Sebastián Galeano Griñó | 15 | 20 | 4 | 4 | 7 | 24† | 63 |
| 10 | (Greece) Georgios Psaroudakis | 3 | 4 | 19 | 19 | 23 | 19 | 53 |

=== Palmarès, CIK-FIA Academy Trophy ===
The CIK-FIA awarded two Academy Trophies in 2026:

- Academy-Senior: (United Kingdom) Albert Lapper (Exprit–Vortex)
- Academy-Junior: (Hong Kong) John Han (Exprit–Vortex)

== Champions of the Future Academy Program ==
The 2026 Champions of the Future Academy Program was the fourth edition of the Champions of the Future Academy Program (COTFA), a kart racing competition organised by the RGMMC Group and sanctioned by the Commission Internationale de Karting (CIK-FIA) with support from F1 Academy. The series was held across six rounds between 26 February and 15 November at five European circuits—Valencia, Thessaloniki, Viterbo, Aspar, and Franciacorta—in three classes: OK-N, OKN-J, and 60 Mini.

Thessaloniki made its international debut. Muscat was set to make its debut prior to its cancellation—alongside rounds at Al Ain and Al Forsan—amidst the Iran War. Michał Zając withstood Veer Chopra and Jagrat Detroja to clinch the OK-N title by six points. Zoltan Coigny emerged victorious in a three-way junior title battle with Axel Nocom and Mitansh Jain. Mayson Hibbert won the non-international 60 Mini class.

=== International results, Champions of the Future Academy Program ===
The top-10 results of each international class held at the Champions of the Future Academy Program:

2026 Champions of the Future Academy Program standings
| Pos | Driver | VAL (Spain) | | | | THE (Greece) | | | | VIT (Italy) | | | | ASP (Spain) | | | | FRN (Italy) | | | | Points |
| Pos | Driver | I1 | F1 | I2 | F2 | I1 | F1 | I2 | F2 | I1 | F1 | I2 | F2 | I1 | F1 | I2 | F2 | I1 | F1 | I2 | F2 | Points |
OK-N
| 1 | (Poland) Michał Zając | (9) | (8) | 1 | 3^{P} | 5 | 6 | 3 | 21† | 3 | 2 | 1^{P} | 1^{P} | (8) | 7 | 5 | 2 | 1^{P} | 1^{P} | 4 | 4^{F} | 469 |
| 2 | (United Arab Emirates) Veer Chopra | 7 | 4 | 10 | 4 | 2 | 1 | 2 | 1^{F} | (11) | 6 | 2 | 2 | 4 | 1 | 6 | (10) | 19 | (10) | 7 | 1 | 463 |
| 3 | (India) Jagrat Detroja | 6 | 3 | 7 | 8 | 1 | 2^{P} | 1^{P} | 3^{P} | 1^{P} | 1^{P} | 7 | 7 | 6 | 4 | (10) | 6 | 28 | (14) | 8 | 26† | 402 |
| 4 | (Spain) Angelina Simons | 1 | 1^{P} | 19 | 9^{F} | 12 | 19 | 27 | 14 | 6 | 9 | 12 | 4 | 1^{P} | Ret^{P} | 8 | 4 | 3 | 3 | 23 | 13 | 290 |
| 5 | (Norway) Ina Rostad | 33 | Ret | DSQ^{P} | DSQ | 19 | Ret | 6 | 22† | 4 | 11 | 16 | Ret | 2 | 2 | 3 | 3 | 2 | 2 | 11 | 2 | 276 |
| 6 | (Switzerland) Elias Lehmann | 13 | Ret | (15) | Ret | 6 | 5 | 9 | 7 | 5 | 7 | 5 | 5 | 3 | Ret | 4 | 5 | (14) | 11 | 10 | 5 | 267 |
| 7 | (Lithuania) Vanesa Šilkūnaitė | 22 | Ret | 3 | 2 | 10 | 9 | 8 | 2 | 17 | 8 | 11 | 14 | 11 | 12 | 11 | 9 | 13 | 29† | 6 | 8 | 225 |
| 8 | (Poland) Kacper Rajpold | 3 | 9 | 5 | 1 | | | | | 2 | 3 | 4 | 6 | | | | | | | | | 201 |
| 9 | (Greece) Emmanouil Lioudakis | 4 | 2 | 2 | 7 | 3^{P} | 3^{F} | 4 | DSQ | 19 | 16 | 19 | 9 | | | | | | | | | 194 |
| 10 | (Poland) Marcel Matyjewicz | 20 | DSQ | 23 | 22 | 15 | 11 | 7 | 4 | 10 | 10 | 18 | (15) | 7 | 5 | 2^{P} | 13 | 10 | 6 | 5 | DSQ | 184 |
OKN-J
| 1 | (Switzerland) Zoltan Coigny | 1^{P} | 2^{P} | 1^{P} | 1^{P} | 6 | DSQ | 16 | 5 | 5 | 2 | 8 | 3 | 4 | (22†)^{F} | 2 | 3^{F} | 3 | 22† | 24 | 11 | 398 |
| 2 | (Philippines) Axel Nocom | 5 | 4 | 6 | 2 | 1^{P} | DSQ^{P} | 3 | 8 | (6) | (9) | 2 | 2 | 1^{P} | DSQ^{P} | 1^{P} | 1^{P} | 19 | (13) | 4 | 4 | 385 |
| 3 | (United Arab Emirates) Mitansh Jain | 6 | 5 | 8 | (6) | 13 | 2 | 4 | 3 | 14 | 5 | 4 | 5 | 2 | 1 | 6 | 5 | (15) | 4 | 23 | (8) | 382 |
| 4 | (Poland) Julia Angelard | (15) | 14 | 13 | 21 | 4 | 14†^{F} | 2 | 4 | 4 | 4 | 7 | 4 | 3 | 2 | 10 | 20 | 4 | 2 | (15) | 5 | 337 |
| 5 | (India) Atiqa Mir | 3 | 3^{F} | 15 | 20 | 2 | DSQ | 1^{P} | 1^{P} | 2^{P} | 6 | 18 | 28† | 9 | 16 | 5 | 11 | 18 | 15 | 6 | 3^{F} | 287 |
| 6 | (Kosovo) Diar Islami | 11 | 9 | 3 | 4 | 3 | 1 | 7 | 2^{F} | 8 | 8 | 19 | 13 | 19 | 25† | 4 | 6 | | | | | 271 |
| 7 | (Switzerland) Jamie Ehrat | 21 | 10 | 5 | 10 | 24 | DSQ | 8 | 9 | 20 | 17 | 24 | 12 | 12 | 5 | 9 | 4 | 8 | 1 | 11 | 9 | 207 |
| 8 | (Venezuela) Alessandro González | 22 | 11 | 21 | (13) | 8 | 6 | 14 | 7 | 11 | DSQ | 27 | 23 | 10 | 3 | 8 | 12 | 17 | 6 | 7 | 6 | 194 |
| 9 | (Dominican Republic) Alonso González | 17 | 16 | 11 | 7 | | | | | 3 | 7 | 12 | 11 | 16 | 9 | 7 | 27† | 6 | 8 | 3 | 7 | 177 |
| 10 | (United Kingdom) Andie Stewart | 7 | 25† | 9 | 3^{F} | 12 | 5 | 15 | 17 | 31 | 19 | 11 | 8 | 18 | 7 | 17 | 16 | 12 | 24†^{F} | 1 | 25†^{P} | 167 |

=== Palmarès, Champions of the Future Academy Program ===
The Champions of the Future Academy Program awarded three titles in 2026, two of which were recognised as international by the CIK-FIA:

- OK-N: (Poland) Michał Zając (KR–IAME)
- OKN-J: (Switzerland) Zoltan Coigny (KR–IAME)
- 60 Mini: (United Kingdom) Mayson Hibbert† (Parolin–TM)

^{†} Non-international title.

== Trofeo delle Industrie ==
The 2026 Trofeo delle Industrie (Italian: 54° Trofeo delle Industrie) was the 54th edition of the Trofeo delle Industrie, a kart racing competition organised by Parma Motorsport and sanctioned by ACI Sport. The event was held on 12–15 November at Lonato, Italy, in six classes: OK-J, KZ2, OK-N, OKN-J, Mini Gr.3, and Mini U10.

The entry list included a record 335 drivers from 50 nationalities. With dry conditions since qualifying, rain arrived prior to the finals, which were contested in drying conditions. Christian Bertuca (Tony Kart–TM) took his third consecutive victory in KZ2, winning the Trofeo Assoluto. The non-international winners were Nicolas Marchesi (OK-N), Vsevolod Osadchyi-Suslovskyi (OKN-J), Theo Steindal (Mini Gr.3), and Johan Berger (Mini U10).

=== International results, Trofeo delle Industrie ===
The top-10 results of each international class held at the Trofeo delle Industrie:

2026 Trofeo delle Industrie KZ2 final
| Pos | # | Driver | Chassis | Engine | Tyres | Laps | Time/Retired | Grid |
|---|---|---|---|---|---|---|---|---|
| 1 | 131 | (Italy) Cristian Bertuca | Tony Kart | TM | V | 20 | 15:37.925 | 1 |
| 2 | 137 | (Italy) Matteo Zanchi | Birel ART | TM | V | 20 | +0.449 | 3 |
| 3 | 159 | (France) Aloïs Girardet | CRG | TM | V | 20 | +0.646 | 9 |
| 4 | 154 | (Italy) Alex Maragliano | Birel ART | TM | V | 20 | +1.601 | 10 |
| 5 | 164 | (Italy) Marco Tormen | Pantano | TM | V | 20 | +2.553 | 7 |
| 6 | 141 | (Italy) Riccardo Rigodanza | IPK | TM | V | 20 | +2.626 | 5 |
| 7 | 138 | (Italy) Christian Gaffuri | TB | TM | V | 20 | +3.674 | 8 |
| 8 | 103 | (Italy) William Lanzeni | Birel ART | TM | V | 20 | +3.850 | 2 |
| 9 | 119 | (Italy) Andrea Di Brigida | Birel ART | TM | V | 20 | +5.549 | 17 |
| 10 | 127 | (Italy) Mattia Limena | Best | TM | V | 20 | +6.169^{1} | 12 |

Tyres key
| B | Bridgestone | L | LeCont |
| C | Carlisle | M | Maxxis |
| D | Dunlop | M | MG Tires |
| G | Goodyear | M | Mojo |
| K | Komet | V | Vega |

Notes
- Fastest lap: (Romania) Daniel Vasile (Maranello–TM) – 45.857 (lap 7)
- ^1 – Mattia Limena finished fourth, but received a five-second time penalty for front fairing irregularities.

=== Palmarès, Trofeo delle Industrie ===
The Trofeo delle Industrie awarded five titles in 2026, one of which was recognised as international by the CIK-FIA:

- KZ2: (Italy) Cristian Bertuca (Tony Kart–TM)
- OK-N: (Italy) Nicolas Marchesi† (KR–IAME)
- OKN-J: (Ukraine) Vsevolod Osadchyi-Suslovskyi† (Energy–IAME)
- Mini Gr.3: (Norway) Theo Steindal† (Henza–TM)
- Mini U10: (Austria) Johan Berger† (Parolin–IAME)

^{†} Non-international title.

== WSK Final Cup ==
The 2026 WSK Final Cup is the 17th edition of the WSK Final Cup, a kart racing competition organised by WSK Promotion and sanctioned by ACI Sport. The series is set to be held across three rounds between 26 August and 29 November at three Italian circuits—Franciacorta, Lonato, and Viterbo—in seven classes: OK, OK-J, KZ2, OK-N, OKN-J, Mini Gr.3, and Mini U10.

=== International results, WSK Final Cup ===
The top-10 results of each international class held at the WSK Final Cup:

2026 WSK Final Cup standings
| Pos | Driver | FRN (Italy) | | | | LON (Italy) | | | | VIT (Italy) | | | | Points |
| Pos | Driver | QH | PA | PB | F | QH | PA | PB | F | QH | PA | PB | F | Points |
OK
| 1 | (Canada) Ilie Tristan Crisan | 5^{P} | 2 | | 2 | 14 | | 2^{F} | 2 | | | | | 167 |
| 2 | (Ukraine) Lev Krutogolov | 1 | 1^{P}^{F} | | 1^{P}^{F} | 5 | 2 | | 27†^{F} | | | | | 159 |
| 3 | (Austria) Niklas Schaufler | | | | | 1^{P} | 1^{P}^{F} | | 1^{P} | | | | | 132 |
| 4 | (Italy) Valeria Viapiana | 4 | 7 | | 4 | 3 | 4 | | 3 | | | | | 105 |
| 5 | (United Kingdom) Henry Domain | | | | | 10 | | 1 | 4 | | | | | 83 |
| 6 | (Switzerland) Alexis Genolet | | | | | 4 | | 3 | 5 | | | | | 64 |
| 7 | (Spain) Benjamin Mañach | 3 | 3 | | 3 | | | | | | | | | 59 |
| 8 | (Czech Republic) Martina Rumlenová | 21 | 20 | | 33† | 6 | | 4 | 6 | | | | | 47 |
| 9 | (Italy) Lamberto Ferrari | 2 | 4 | | 5 | 13 | 13 | | 13 | | | | | 44 |
| 10 | (Slovakia) Alex Molota | | | | | 7 | 3 | | 33† | | | | | 36 |
OK-J
| 1 | (Spain) Daniel Mirón | 9 | 1 | | 2 | 3 | 3 | | 2 | | | | | 173 |
| 2 | (United Kingdom) Emerson MacAndrew-Uren | 14 | | 6 | 7 | 4 | | 2 | 1^{F} | | | | | 137 |
| 3 | (Italy) Niccolò Perico | 5^{P} | 2 | | 1 | 27 | 9 | | 12 | | | | | 111 |
| 4 | (Italy) Antônio Pizzonia Neto | 8 | | 2 | 6 | 13 | 2 | | 5 | | | | | 111 |
| 5 | (Poland) Leo Górski | 18 | | 7 | 29† | 1^{P} | 1^{P}^{F} | | 3^{P} | | | | | 109 |
| 6 | (Czech Republic) Zdeněk Bábíček | 11 | 3^{F} | | 5 | 6 | | 3 | 6 | | | | | 93 |
| 7 | (Italy) Michele Orlando | | | | | 8 | | 1^{F} | 4 | | | | | 85 |
| 8 | (United Kingdom) Jarlath Sayer | 1 | 5^{P} | | 3^{P} | 7 | 24† | | 33† | | | | | 56 |
| 9 | (Italy) Julian Frasnelli | 2 | | 1^{P} | 19^{F} | | | | | | | | | 50 |
| 10 | (Georgia (country)) Leon Chelidze | 6 | | 8 | 10 | 9 | 4 | | Ret | | | | | 43 |
KZ2
| 1 | (United Kingdom) Jenson Graham | C | C | | C | 4 | | 1^{F} | 1^{P}^{F} | | | | | 129 |
| 2 | (Netherlands) Senna van Walstijn | C | C | | C | 15 | 1^{F} | | 2 | | | | | 100 |
| 3 | (Italy) Cristian Bertuca | C | C | | C | 7^{P} | 2 | | 3 | | | | | 86 |
| 4 | (Italy) Marco Tormen | C | C | | C | 2 | | 3^{P} | 4 | | | | | 71 |
| 5 | (Ukraine) Mark Brovko | C | C | | C | 18 | | 2 | 15 | | | | | 44 |
| 6 | (Sweden) Viktor Gustavsson | C | C | | C | 3 | 10 | | 5 | | | | | 41 |
| 7 | (Switzerland) Jean Luyet | C | C | | C | 12 | | 4 | 6 | | | | | 41 |
| 8 | (France) Émilien Denner | C | C | | C | 5 | 3 | | 35† | | | | | 38 |
| 9 | (Spain) Genís Cívico | C | C | | C | 1 | 9^{P} | | 7 | | | | | 34 |
| 10 | (Italy) Michael Ider | C | C | | C | 13 | 4 | | 13 | | | | | 26 |

== Rotax Max Challenge ==
The 2026 Rotax Max Challenge was the 27th edition of the Rotax Max Challenge (RMC), a series of kart racing competitions organised by BRP-Rotax and sanctioned by the Commission Internationale de Karting (CIK-FIA). Featured on the international calendar were five competitions—the RMC Winter Cup, the five-round RMC Central Europe, the four-round RMC Euro Trophy, the RMC International Trophy, and the RMC Grand Finals—in four classes: DD2, DD2M, Senior Max, Junior Max.

The pre-season Winter Cup at Campillos was won by Antoine Barbaroux (DD2), Macauley Bishop (Senior Max), and Zdeněk Bábíček (Junior Max).

=== International calendar, Rotax Max Challenge ===
The international RMC calendar included 12 events from five competitions with 18 titles on offer:

2026 Rotax Max Challenge international calendar
| Event | Championship | Circuit | Dates | Class | Winner |
|---|---|---|---|---|---|
| 1 | RMC Winter Cup | (Spain) Campillos | 8–10 January | DD2 | (France) Antoine Barbaroux |
| 1 | RMC Winter Cup | (Spain) Campillos | 8–10 January | Senior Max | (United Kingdom) Macauley Bishop |
| 1 | RMC Winter Cup | (Spain) Campillos | 8–10 January | Junior Max | (Czech Republic) Zdeněk Bábíček |
| 2 | RMC Central Europe (1/5) | (Italy) Jesolo | 27 February – 1 March | DD2 | (Austria) Leon Mandl |
| 2 | RMC Central Europe (1/5) | (Italy) Jesolo | 27 February – 1 March | DD2M | (Lithuania) Martynas Tankevičius |
| 2 | RMC Central Europe (1/5) | (Italy) Jesolo | 27 February – 1 March | Senior Max | (Switzerland) Tino Sidler |
| 2 | RMC Central Europe (1/5) | (Italy) Jesolo | 27 February – 1 March | Junior Max | (Slovakia) Martin Šoltys |
| 3 | RMC Euro Trophy (1/4) | (Italy) Cremona | 11–15 March | DD2 | (Italy) Michael Rosina |
| 3 | RMC Euro Trophy (1/4) | (Italy) Cremona | 11–15 March | DD2M | (France) Nicolas Picot |
| 3 | RMC Euro Trophy (1/4) | (Italy) Cremona | 11–15 March | Senior Max | (Slovenia) Nik Trobec |
| 3 | RMC Euro Trophy (1/4) | (Italy) Cremona | 11–15 March | Junior Max | (Czech Republic) Zdeněk Bábíček |
| 4 | RMC Euro Trophy (2/4) | (Germany) Wackersdorf | 29 April – 3 May | DD2 | (Czech Republic) Jakub Běžel |
| 4 | RMC Euro Trophy (2/4) | (Germany) Wackersdorf | 29 April – 3 May | DD2M | (France) Nicolas Picot |
| 4 | RMC Euro Trophy (2/4) | (Germany) Wackersdorf | 29 April – 3 May | Senior Max | (Spain) Jeremy Reuvers |
| 4 | RMC Euro Trophy (2/4) | (Germany) Wackersdorf | 29 April – 3 May | Junior Max | (Czech Republic) Zdeněk Bábíček |
| 5 | RMC Central Europe (2/5) | (Czech Republic) Třinec | 22–24 May | DD2 | (Austria) Manuel Tenschert |
| 5 | RMC Central Europe (2/5) | (Czech Republic) Třinec | 22–24 May | DD2M | (Lithuania) Martynas Tankevičius |
| 5 | RMC Central Europe (2/5) | (Czech Republic) Třinec | 22–24 May | Senior Max | (Slovakia) Martin Lichner |
| 5 | RMC Central Europe (2/5) | (Czech Republic) Třinec | 22–24 May | Junior Max | (Slovakia) Martin Šoltys |
| 6 | RMC Euro Trophy (3/4) | (Belgium) Genk | 24–28 June | DD2 | (Czech Republic) Jakub Běžel |
| 6 | RMC Euro Trophy (3/4) | (Belgium) Genk | 24–28 June | DD2M | (Switzerland) Dimo Notarfrancesco |
| 6 | RMC Euro Trophy (3/4) | (Belgium) Genk | 24–28 June | Senior Max | (United Kingdom) Freddie Lloyd |
| 6 | RMC Euro Trophy (3/4) | (Belgium) Genk | 24–28 June | Junior Max | (United Kingdom) Finlay Lines |
| 7 | RMC International Trophy | (France) Le Mans | 14–18 July | DD2 | (United Kingdom) Mark Kimber |
| 7 | RMC International Trophy | (France) Le Mans | 14–18 July | DD2M | (United Kingdom) Jack Dex |
| 7 | RMC International Trophy | (France) Le Mans | 14–18 July | Senior Max | (United Kingdom) Sean Butcher |
| 7 | RMC International Trophy | (France) Le Mans | 14–18 July | Junior Max | (United Kingdom) Albert Friend |
| 8 | RMC Central Europe (3/5) | (Austria) Pachfurth | 31 July – 2 August | DD2 | (Austria) Leon Mandl |
| 8 | RMC Central Europe (3/5) | (Austria) Pachfurth | 31 July – 2 August | DD2M | (Lithuania) Martynas Tankevičius |
| 8 | RMC Central Europe (3/5) | (Austria) Pachfurth | 31 July – 2 August | Senior Max | (Israel) Yam Pinto |
| 8 | RMC Central Europe (3/5) | (Austria) Pachfurth | 31 July – 2 August | Junior Max | (Czech Republic) Kryštof Kyllar |
| 9 | RMC Euro Trophy (4/4) | (Czech Republic) Třinec | 9–13 September | DD2 | (Czech Republic) Jakub Běžel |
| 9 | RMC Euro Trophy (4/4) | (Czech Republic) Třinec | 9–13 September | DD2M | (France) Nicolas Picot |
| 9 | RMC Euro Trophy (4/4) | (Czech Republic) Třinec | 9–13 September | Senior Max | (United Kingdom) Cian Geraghty |
| 9 | RMC Euro Trophy (4/4) | (Czech Republic) Třinec | 9–13 September | Junior Max | (Czech Republic) Zdeněk Bábíček |
| 10 | RMC Central Europe (4/5) | (Hungary) Kecskemét | 2–4 October | DD2 | (Austria) Manuel Tenschert |
| 10 | RMC Central Europe (4/5) | (Hungary) Kecskemét | 2–4 October | DD2M | (Lithuania) Martynas Tankevičius |
| 10 | RMC Central Europe (4/5) | (Hungary) Kecskemét | 2–4 October | Senior Max | (Hungary) Martin Varga |
| 10 | RMC Central Europe (4/5) | (Hungary) Kecskemét | 2–4 October | Junior Max | (Hungary) Marcell Mezei |
| 11 | RMC Central Europe (5/5) | (Italy) Jesolo | 16–18 October | DD2 | (Austria) Leon Mandl |
| 11 | RMC Central Europe (5/5) | (Italy) Jesolo | 16–18 October | DD2M | (Poland) Michał Kozerski |
| 11 | RMC Central Europe (5/5) | (Italy) Jesolo | 16–18 October | Senior Max | (Austria) Bastian Ottensammer |
| 11 | RMC Central Europe (5/5) | (Italy) Jesolo | 16–18 October | Junior Max | (Slovakia) Martin Šoltys |
| 12 | RMC Grand Finals | (Portugal) Portimão | 7–14 November | DD2 | (Sweden) Hannes Morin |
| 12 | RMC Grand Finals | (Portugal) Portimão | 7–14 November | Senior Max | (United Kingdom) Lewis Gilbert |
| 12 | RMC Grand Finals | (Portugal) Portimão | 7–14 November | Junior Max | (Czech Republic) Zdeněk Bábíček |

=== International results, Rotax Max Challenge ===
==== RMC Winter Cup ====
The top-five results of each international class held at the RMC Winter Cup:

2026 RMC Winter Cup DD2 final
| Pos | # | Driver | Chassis | Tyres | Laps | Time/Retired | Grid |
|---|---|---|---|---|---|---|---|
| 1 | 406 | (France) Antoine Barbaroux | LN | M | 14 | 14:40.572 | 1 |
| 2 | 517 | (France) Nicolas Picot | Sodi | M | 14 | +2.388 | 6 |
| 3 | 417 | (Belgium) Lenn Nijs | KR | M | 14 | +3.019 | 4 |
| 4 | 407 | (Spain) Vicente Márquez | KR | M | 14 | +4.490 | 3 |
| 5 | 405 | (Czech Republic) Jakub Běžel | LN | M | 14 | +4.749 | 7 |

Tyres key
| B | Bridgestone | L | LeCont |
| C | Carlisle | M | Maxxis |
| D | Dunlop | M | MG Tires |
| G | Goodyear | M | Mojo |
| K | Komet | V | Vega |

Notes
- Fastest lap: (France) Antoine Barbaroux (LN) – 1:02.452 (lap 7)

2026 RMC Winter Cup Senior Max final
| Pos | # | Driver | Chassis | Tyres | Laps | Time/Retired | Grid |
|---|---|---|---|---|---|---|---|
| 1 | 368 | (United Kingdom) Macauley Bishop | LN | M | 14 | 14:50.185 | 1 |
| 2 | 333 | (United Kingdom) Scott Marsh | Tony Kart | M | 14 | +6.333 | 3 |
| 3 | 396 | (Belgium) Bran Vanderveken | Tony Kart | M | 14 | +6.759 | 5 |
| 4 | 321 | (Spain) Jeremy Reuvers | LN | M | 14 | +6.854 | 2 |
| 5 | 313 | (Switzerland) Tino Sidler | Kosmic | M | 14 | +7.007 | 6 |

Tyres key
| B | Bridgestone | L | LeCont |
| C | Carlisle | M | Maxxis |
| D | Dunlop | M | MG Tires |
| G | Goodyear | M | Mojo |
| K | Komet | V | Vega |

Notes
- Fastest lap: (Spain) Jeremy Reuvers (LN) – 1:02.987 (lap 4)

2026 RMC Winter Cup Junior Max final
| Pos | # | Driver | Chassis | Tyres | Laps | Time/Retired | Grid |
|---|---|---|---|---|---|---|---|
| 1 | 271 | (Czech Republic) Zdeněk Bábíček | LN | M | 11 | 11:51.808 | 1 |
| 2 | 218 | (United Kingdom) Jenson Chalk | Kosmic | M | 11 | +0.612 | 2 |
| 3 | 208 | (Lithuania) Majus Mazinas | Kosmic | M | 11 | +1.506 | 3 |
| 4 | 225 | (Switzerland) Luan Seidl | Kosmic | M | 11 | +2.755 | 9 |
| 5 | 222 | (United Kingdom) Riley Murro | KR | M | 11 | +3.248 | 14 |

Tyres key
| B | Bridgestone | L | LeCont |
| C | Carlisle | M | Maxxis |
| D | Dunlop | M | MG Tires |
| G | Goodyear | M | Mojo |
| K | Komet | V | Vega |

Notes
- Fastest lap: (Switzerland) Luan Seidl (Kosmic) – 1:03.941 (lap 5)

==== RMC International Trophy ====
The top-five results of each international class held at the RMC International Trophy:

2026 RMC International Trophy DD2 final
| Pos | # | Driver | Chassis | Tyres | Laps | Time/Retired | Grid |
|---|---|---|---|---|---|---|---|
| 1 | 536 | (United Kingdom) Mark Kimber | LN | M | 16 | 14:22.238 | 1 |
| 2 | 571 | (Czech Republic) Jakub Běžel | Tony Kart | M | 16 | +1.461 | 3 |
| 3 | 532 | (Netherlands) Enzo Bol | KR | M | 16 | +1.999 | 5 |
| 4 | 559 | (Austria) Leon Mandl | Birel ART | M | 16 | +6.198 | 10 |
| 5 | 554 | (Latvia) Emīls Akmens | Tony Kart | M | 16 | +6.623 | 4 |

Tyres key
| B | Bridgestone | L | LeCont |
| C | Carlisle | M | Maxxis |
| D | Dunlop | M | MG Tires |
| G | Goodyear | M | Mojo |
| K | Komet | V | Vega |

Notes
- Fastest lap: (Netherlands) Sem Knopjes (Birel ART) – 52.935 (lap 13)

2026 RMC International Trophy DD2M final
| Pos | # | Driver | Chassis | Tyres | Laps | Time/Retired | Grid |
|---|---|---|---|---|---|---|---|
| 1 | 645 | (United Kingdom) Jack Dex | MS | M | 16 | 14:47.389 | 1 |
| 2 | 633 | (France) Vivien Cussac-Picot | Tony Kart | M | 16 | +0.155 | 8 |
| 3 | 625 | (Peru) Gustavo Michelsen | Birel ART | M | 16 | +0.273 | 9 |
| 4 | 603 | (France) Maxime Gravouille | Kosmic | M | 16 | +0.641 | 3 |
| 5 | 619 | (Peru) Harold Watson | Sodi | M | 16 | +1.056 | 17 |

Tyres key
| B | Bridgestone | L | LeCont |
| C | Carlisle | M | Maxxis |
| D | Dunlop | M | MG Tires |
| G | Goodyear | M | Mojo |
| K | Komet | V | Vega |

Notes
- Fastest lap: (Germany) Alex Fielenbach (CS55) – 53.687 (lap 16)

2026 RMC International Trophy Senior Max final
| Pos | # | Driver | Chassis | Tyres | Laps | Time/Retired | Grid |
|---|---|---|---|---|---|---|---|
| 1 | 384 | (United Kingdom) Sean Butcher | Kosmic | M | 16 | 14:26.085 | 2 |
| 2 | 355 | (France) Tom Langlois | Sodi | M | 16 | +1.039 | 1 |
| 3 | 383 | (United Kingdom) Leon Hastie | CS55 | M | 16 | +2.302 | 4 |
| 4 | 301 | (Netherlands) Max Sadurski | KR | M | 16 | +2.638 | 5 |
| 5 | 309 | (France) Matéo Rivals | EOS | M | 16 | +4.293 | 7 |

Tyres key
| B | Bridgestone | L | LeCont |
| C | Carlisle | M | Maxxis |
| D | Dunlop | M | MG Tires |
| G | Goodyear | M | Mojo |
| K | Komet | V | Vega |

Notes
- Fastest lap: (Belgium) Bran Vanderveken (Tony Kart) – 53.340 (lap 12)

2026 RMC International Trophy Junior Max final
| Pos | # | Driver | Chassis | Tyres | Laps | Time/Retired | Grid |
|---|---|---|---|---|---|---|---|
| 1 | 259 | (United Kingdom) Albert Friend | LN | M | 15 | 14:10.180 | 3 |
| 2 | 235 | (Switzerland) Rareș Pascu | LN | M | 15 | +0.622 | 11 |
| 3 | 251 | (Lithuania) Majus Mazinas | Kosmic | M | 15 | +0.739 | 9 |
| 4 | 257 | (United Kingdom) Sebastian Clark | Kosmic | M | 15 | +1.436 | 8 |
| 5 | 281 | (United Kingdom) Finlay Lines | Kosmic | M | 15 | +1.593 | 1 |

Tyres key
| B | Bridgestone | L | LeCont |
| C | Carlisle | M | Maxxis |
| D | Dunlop | M | MG Tires |
| G | Goodyear | M | Mojo |
| K | Komet | V | Vega |

Notes
- Fastest lap: (Lithuania) Majus Mazinas (Kosmic) – 54.421 (lap 13)

==== RMC Euro Trophy ====
The top-five results of each international class held at the RMC Euro Trophy:

2026 RMC Euro Trophy standings
| Pos | Driver | CRE (Italy) | | | | WAC (Germany) | | | | GEN (Belgium) | | | | TŘI (Czech Republic) | | | | Points |
| Pos | Driver | QH | PA | PB | F | QH | PA | PB | F | QH | PA | PB | F | QH | PA | PB | F | Points |
DD2
| 1 | (Czech Republic) Jakub Běžel | 2 | 2 | | 3 | 1 | 5^{P} | | 1^{P} | 2 | 1 | | 1^{P} | | | | | 481 |
| 2 | (Italy) Leonardo Baccaglini | 3 | 6 | | 2^{F} | 4 | 4 | | 4 | 5 | 2^{F} | | 5 | | | | | 444 |
| 3 | (Poland) Patryk Donica | 10 | 4^{F} | | 5 | 3 | 1 | | 3 | 1^{P} | Ret^{P} | | 2 | | | | | 425 |
| 4 | (Estonia) Ragnar Veerus | 9 | 5 | | 10 | 2^{P} | 11 | | 10 | 12 | 13 | | 10 | | | | | 417 |
| 5 | (Italy) Michael Rosina | 1 | 1^{P} | | 1^{P} | 13 | 15 | | 14 | 13 | 25† | | 15 | | | | | 394 |
DD2M
| 1 | (France) Nicolas Picot | 1 | 1 | | 1 | 1 | 1 | | 1^{F} | 1 | 1 | | 4 | | | | | 489 |
| 2 | (Switzerland) Dimo Notarfrancesco | 3 | 3 | | 2 | 4 | 3 | | 2 | 2 | 3 | | 1 | | | | | 460 |
| 3 | (Switzerland) Martin Pasandin | 5 | 5 | | 5 | 5 | 4 | | 5 | | | | | | | | | 289 |
| 4 | (Switzerland) Mirco Gervasoni | | | | | 2 | 6 | | DSQ | 4 | 2 | | 3 | | | | | 250 |
| 5 | (Belgium) Steve Vermeulen | | | | | | | | | 3 | 4† | | 2 | | | | | 151 |
Senior Max
| 1 | (Spain) Jeremy Reuvers | 18 | | 9 | 22 | 1^{P} | 1^{P} | | 1^{P} | 1 | 2^{P} | | 2 | | | | | 434 |
| 2 | (United Kingdom) Freddie Lloyd | 22 | | 3 | 5 | 14 | | 3 | 7 | 3 | 4 | | 1 | | | | | 418 |
| 3 | (United Kingdom) Lewis Gilbert | 2 | | 1^{P} | DSQ | 6 | | 1 | 8 | 7 | 1 | | 5 | | | | | 403 |
| 4 | (Belgium) Bran Vanderveken | 4 | | 6^{F} | 6 | 12 | | 36† | 11 | 4 | | 3 | 7 | | | | | 388 |
| 5 | (United Kingdom) Macauley Bishop | 7^{P} | 1 | | DSQ | 8 | | 34† | 4 | 2 | | 1^{P} | 3 | | | | | 371 |
Junior Max
| 1 | (Czech Republic) Zdeněk Bábíček | 7 | 2 | | 1 | 1 | 3^{P} | | 1^{P} | 3 | 3 | | 3 | | | | | 463 |
| 2 | (Switzerland) Rareș Pascu | 9 | 1 | | 3 | 3 | 2 | | 4 | 4 | | 21 | 8 | | | | | 426 |
| 3 | (Slovakia) Martin Šoltys | 15 | 10 | | 10 | 2^{P} | | 1^{P} | 2^{F} | 9 | 5 | | 13 | | | | | 415 |
| 4 | (United Kingdom) Sebastian Clark | 10 | | 3 | 4 | 9 | 10 | | 15 | 6 | | 5 | 11 | | | | | 404 |
| 5 | (United Kingdom) Albert Friend | 6 | | 1 | 5 | 5 | DSQ | | 12 | 1 | 1^{P}^{F} | | 2^{P} | | | | | 401 |

=== Palmarès, Rotax Max Challenge ===
The RMC is set to award 29 titles in 2026, 18 of which would be recognised as international by the CIK-FIA:

- RMC Winter Cup: (France) Antoine Barbaroux (DD2) / (United Kingdom) Macauley Bishop (Senior Max) / (Czech Republic) Zdeněk Bábíček (Junior Max) / (France) Nicolas Picot† (DD2M) / (United Kingdom) Logan Rolfe† (Mini Max)
- RMC International Trophy: (United Kingdom) Mark Kimber (DD2) / (United Kingdom) Jack Dex (DD2M) / (United Kingdom) Sean Butcher (Senior Max) / (United Kingdom) Albert Friend (Junior Max) / (United Kingdom) Austin Oman† (Mini Max) / (United Kingdom) Jayan Prakash† (Micro Max)
- RMC Euro Trophy: To be determined (DD2) / To be determined (DD2M) / To be determined (Senior Max) / To be determined (Junior Max) / To be determined† (Mini Max)
- RMC Central Europe: To be determined (DD2) / To be determined (DD2M) / To be determined (Senior Max) / To be determined (Junior Max) / To be determined† (Mini Max) / To be determined† (Micro Max)
- RMC Grand Finals: To be determined (DD2) / To be determined (Senior Max) / To be determined (Junior Max) / To be determined† (DD2M) / To be determined† (Mini Max) / To be determined† (Micro Max) / To be determined† (E10 Mini)

^{†} Non-international title.

== IAME Series ==
The 2026 IAME Series was the 20th edition of the IAME Series, a series of kart racing competitions organised by Italian American Motor Engineering (IAME) and sanctioned by the Commission Internationale de Karting (CIK-FIA). Featured on the international calendar were two competitions—the IAME Winter Cup and the four-round IAME Euro Series—in two classes: X30 Senior (X30-S) and X30 Junior (X30-J).

The pre-season Winter Cup at Valencia was won by Spaniards Aaron García (X30-S) and Ivan González (X30-J), with results taken from the intermediate classifications after the finals were cancelled due to 100–140 km/h (62–87 mph) winds prompting a red weather warning by the Generalitat Valenciana.

=== International calendar, IAME Series ===
The international IAME calendar included five events from two competitions with four titles on offer:

2026 IAME Series international calendar
| Event | Championship | Circuit | Dates | Class | Winner |
|---|---|---|---|---|---|
| 1 | IAME Winter Cup | (Spain) Valencia | 11–14 February | X30-S | (Spain) Aaron García (Note: Due to poor weather conditions at Valencia, the finals of the IAME Winter Cup were cancelled and the intermediate classification was promoted to the final standings.) |
| 1 | IAME Winter Cup | (Spain) Valencia | 11–14 February | X30-J | (Spain) Ivan González |
| 2 | IAME Euro Series (1/4) | (Spain) Zuera | 11–14 March | X30-S | (Italy) Danny Carenini |
| 2 | IAME Euro Series (1/4) | (Spain) Zuera | 11–14 March | X30-J | (Spain) Ivan González |
| 3 | IAME Euro Series (2/4) | (Italy) Franciacorta | 15–18 April | X30-S | (United Kingdom) Freddie Lloyd |
| 3 | IAME Euro Series (2/4) | (Italy) Franciacorta | 15–18 April | X30-J | (United Kingdom) Max Endacott |
| 4 | IAME Euro Series (3/4) | (Germany) Wackersdorf | 24–27 June | X30-S | (Italy) Danny Carenini |
| 4 | IAME Euro Series (3/4) | (Germany) Wackersdorf | 24–27 June | X30-J | (Spain) Daniel Mirón |
| 5 | IAME Euro Series (4/4) | (Belgium) Genk | 26–29 August | X30-S | (Netherlands) Aron Weeda |
| 5 | IAME Euro Series (4/4) | (Belgium) Genk | 26–29 August | X30-J | (Belgium) Priam Bruno |

=== International results, IAME Series ===
==== IAME Winter Cup ====
The top-five results of each international class held at the IAME Winter Cup, which were based on intermediate classifications:

2026 IAME Winter Cup X30-S classification
| Pos | # | Driver | Chassis | Tyres |
|---|---|---|---|---|
| 1 | 201 | (Spain) Aaron García | KR | M |
| 2 | 211 | (Republic of Ireland) Morgan Moore | KR | M |
| 3 | 258 | (Spain) Daniel Maciá | Kalì | M |
| 4 | 294 | (Andorra) Alex Machado | Parolin | M |
| 5 | 237 | (United Kingdom) Sebastian Minns | KR | M |

Tyres key
| B | Bridgestone | L | LeCont |
| C | Carlisle | M | Maxxis |
| D | Dunlop | M | MG Tires |
| G | Goodyear | M | Mojo |
| K | Komet | V | Vega |

2026 IAME Winter Cup X30-J classification
| Pos | # | Driver | Chassis | Tyres |
|---|---|---|---|---|
| 1 | 61 | (Spain) Ivan González | Birel ART | M |
| 2 | 38 | (United Kingdom) Freddie Wood | KR | M |
| 3 | 47 | (Belgium) Antoine Sylva Venant | KR | M |
| 4 | 27 | (Germany) Bruno Greiling | KR | M |
| 5 | 18 | (Switzerland) Aurelio Longhitano | LN | M |

Tyres key
| B | Bridgestone | L | LeCont |
| C | Carlisle | M | Maxxis |
| D | Dunlop | M | MG Tires |
| G | Goodyear | M | Mojo |
| K | Komet | V | Vega |

==== IAME Euro Series ====
The top-five results of each international class held at the IAME Euro Series:

2026 IAME Euro Series standings
| Pos | Driver | ZUE (Spain) | | | FRN (Italy) | | | WAC (Germany) | | | GEN (Belgium) | | | Points |
| Pos | Driver | QH | SH | F | QH | SH | F | QH | SH | F | QH | SH | F | Points |
X30-S
| 1 | (Spain) Aaron García | (4) | 7 | 5 | 2 | 1 | (7)^{P} | 2 | 2 | 5 | 3 | (8) | 4 | 215 |
| 2 | (Italy) Danny Carenini | 9 | 4 | 1 | (9) | 3 | 17 | 5 | (4) | 1 | 1 | 2^{P} | 15 | 206 |
| 3 | (Finland) Otto Pyykönen | 3 | 5 | 33† | 26 | 33 | 16 | 3 | 5 | 4 | 5 | 3 | 3 | 174 |
| 4 | (Switzerland) Dan Allemann | 1^{P} | 2^{P} | 3 | 6 | (11) | 34† | 1^{P} | 1^{P} | 34†^{P} | (7) | 6 | 30 | 161 |
| 5 | (Spain) Rubén Moya | 6 | 3 | 2 | 16 | 22 | 6 | 47 | 29 | (12) | 4 | 4 | 8 | 154 |
X30-J
| 1 | (Spain) Ivan González | 1 | 1^{P} | 1^{P} | (10) | (8) | (5) | 7 | 5 | 4^{F} | 4 | 5 | 3 | 231 |
| 2 | (United Kingdom) Max Endacott | 2 | 2 | 5 | 4 | 3 | 1 | 3 | 11 | 6 | 16 | (12) | 18 | 210 |
| 3 | (France) Téo Policand | 6 | 5 | 7 | 1 | 1^{P} | 31†^{P} | (10) | 3 | 2 | 7 | 24 | 5 | 204 |
| 4 | (United Kingdom) Sukhmani Khera | 4 | 3 | 2 | 17 | 10 | 4 | 18 | (14) | 9 | 5 | 13 | (28)^{F} | 152 |
| 5 | (United Kingdom) George Clarke | 3 | 8 | 6 | 3 | 4 | 2 | 24 | 22 | 14 | 33 | 26 | 31† | 136 |

=== Palmarès, IAME Series ===
The IAME Series awarded six calendar titles in 2026, four of which were recognised as international by the CIK-FIA:

- IAME Winter Cup: (Spain) Aaron García (X30-S) / (Spain) Ivan González (X30-J) / (France) Aaron Bordanova† (X30-Mi)
- IAME Euro Series: (Spain) Aaron García (X30-S) / (Spain) Ivan González (X30-J) / (United Kingdom) Ilyas Sami† (X30-Mi)

^{†} Non-international title.

The IAME Series is set to award five global titles and eight continental titles in series not recognised by the CIK-FIA:

- IAME Warrior Final: To be determined (X30-S) / To be determined (X30-J) / To be determined (X30-Ma) / To be determined (S125) / To be determined (X30-Mi)
- IAME Series Asia: To be determined (X30-S) / To be determined (X30-J) / To be determined (X30-Ma) / To be determined (WS)
- IAME Asia Final: To be determined (X30-S) / To be determined (X30-J) / To be determined (X30-Ma) / To be determined (WS)

== International Karting Ranking ==
2026 is the fourth season of the International Karting Ranking (IKR), a points system by the CIK-FIA that ranks all kart racers registered to national governing bodies recognised by the FIA.

== See also ==
- Commission Internationale de Karting
- List of kart racing championships
- List of international kart racing champions
