= Atiqa Mir =

Indian kart racing driver (born 2014)

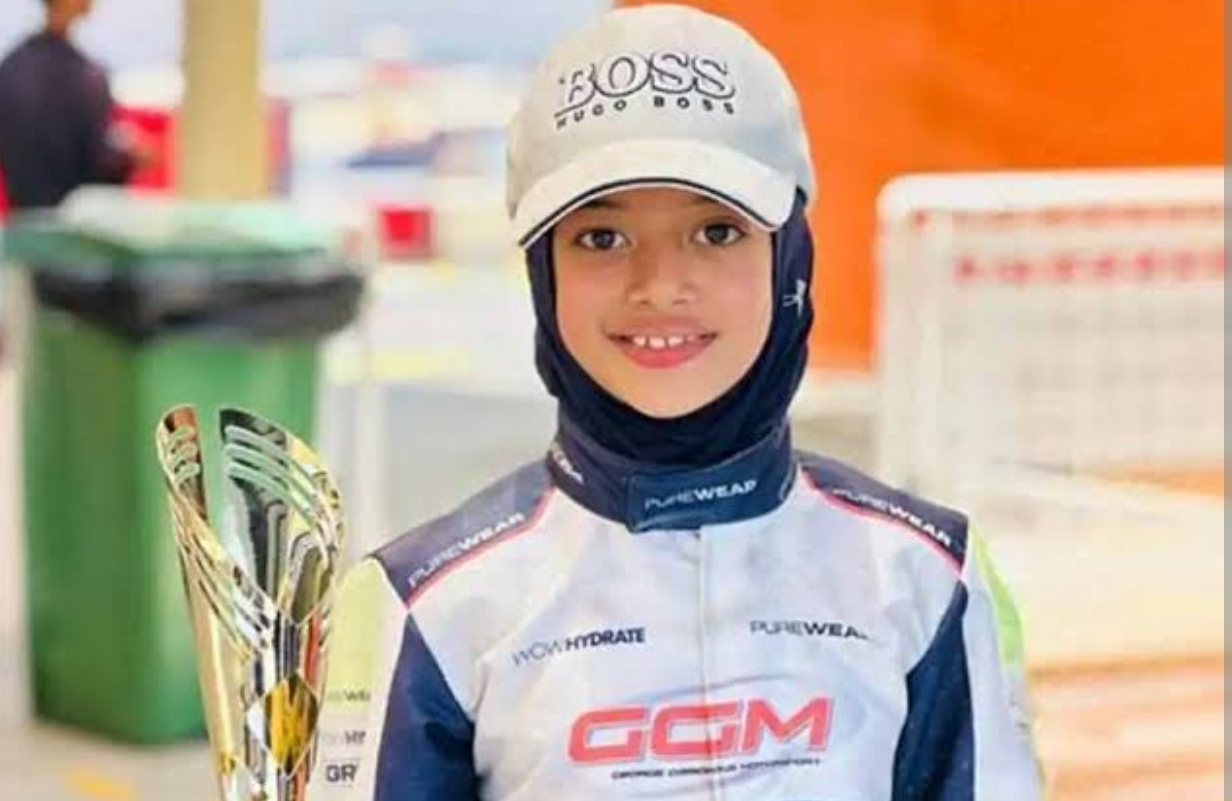
- Nationality: Indian
- Born: Srinagar, Jammu and Kashmir, India

Atiqa Mir (born 2014) is an Indian kart racing driver from Srinagar, Jammu and Kashmir. She is known for being the first Indian and Asian female racer selected for the Formula 1 Academy's "Discover Your Drive" development programme.

== Early life ==
Mir was born in Srinagar, Jammu and Kashmir, India, and moved to Dubai at an early age. She began racing electric karts recreationally before transitioning to professional karting. Her father, Asif Nazir Mir, is a former national karting champion in India and has supported her racing career.

== Career ==
=== Karting in the UAE ===
Mir began competitive karting in the UAE at age six. In the 2022–23 season, she was vice-champion in the UAE IAME National Karting Championship in the Mini R category.

In February 2025, she secured a podium finish at the IAME Summer Cup held at Yas Marina Circuit in Abu Dhabi.

=== International races ===
Mir became the first Indian female driver to qualify for the finals of the Rotax Euro Trophy in South Garda, Italy in 2024.

Later that year, she won a race in the Micro Max category at the Rotax Max Challenge International Trophy (RMCIT) held in Le Mans, France, becoming the first female racer to win a race in the series.

In January 2025, she joined the Babyrace Driver Academy in Italy to compete in the WSK Karting Series.

She also became the only Asian driver selected for the Iron Dames Young Talent programme in 2024.

=== F1 Academy development programme ===
In 2025, Mir was selected for the Formula 1 Academy's "Discover Your Drive" programme, which aims to develop young female talent in motorsport. She was the only Asian and one of the youngest selected.

Shortly after, she was signed by AKCEL GP, a UAE-based karting team affiliated with the F1 Academy.

In November 2026, Atiqa made her debut at the FIA Karting World Championship in La Conca, Italy. She finished sixth in Race 1 after gaining 16 positions from her qualifying position of 83rd. She finished 40th overall among 87 competitors.
