= Aspar Circuit =

Motorsport circuit in Algemesí, Spain

- Main Circuit (2017–present)
- Location: Algemesí-Guadassuar, Valencian Community, Spain
- Coordinates: 39°13′35″N 0°28′0″W
- FIA Grade: 6A (Autocross)
- Owner: Jorge Martínez Aspar & Juan Roig (2022–present)
- Operator: Aspar Team (2022–present)
- Broke ground: 2016
- Opened: 8 July 2017; 8 years ago Re-opened: May 2024; 1 year ago
- Closed: July 2021; 4 years ago
- Former names: Circuit de la Ribera (2017–2021)
- Major events: FIA Motorsport Games - Karting (2024)

Main Circuit (2017–present)
- Surface: Asphalt
- Length: 2.200 km (1.367 mi)
- Turns: 20

The Aspar Circuit (formerly Circuit de la Ribera) is a 2.200 km (1.367 mi) motorsport complex located between the municipalities of Guadassuar and Algemesí, in the province of Valencia, in the Valencian Community, Spain. After being inaugurated in 2017 and with various problems that kept it closed for a long time, in 2022 it passed into the hands of Jorge Martínez Aspar together with Juan Roig, opening its doors again in May 2024 as a circuit and base for the Aspar Team.

== History ==
The Circuit de la Ribera project began to be carried out in mid-2015. At the end of 2016 the project obtained the environmental license and requested the works permit to begin the construction of the main building. Months later it was almost finished and was waiting to meet all the requirements for the opening which took place on 8 July 2017, with an opening party held on 22 July.

In 2019, the PSOE government of Guadassuar began to put obstacles to the circuit alleging that it did not comply with the Law of Shows and closed it. After endorsing the legality of the circuit by the Superior Court of Justice of the Valencian Community in 2020, it remained closed due to the COVID-19 pandemic and because the municipal council continued to demand actions on it. Finally and after the situation did not improve, in the summer of 2021, the circuit's closure was formally announced.

The following year, Jorge Martínez Aspar and Juan Roig bought the facilities, with the aim of reopening the circuit, resuming its activities and establishing the headquarters of the Aspar Team there.

== Layout ==
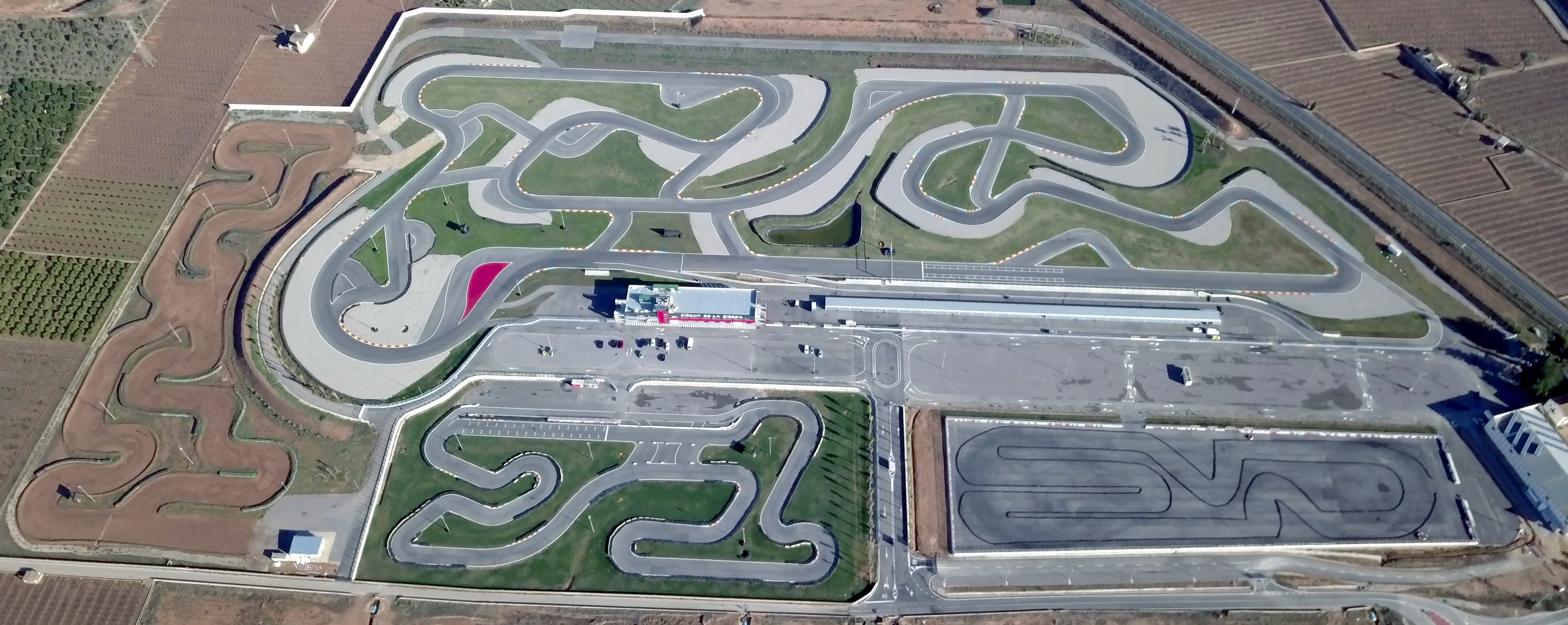
View of Aspar Circuit

The Aspar Circuit is a 350.000 m^{2} (3,767.37 sq ft) sports complex capable of hosting several motorsports events simultaneously. It is basically divided into four areas:

- Main circuit: 2.200 km (1.367 mi) metres long, 400 m (1,300 ft) metres straight, 10 to 12 m (33 to 39 ft) wide, 10 left-hand bends and 10 right-hand bends.
- Karting circuit: 0.850 km (0.528 mi) long, 8 m (26 ft) wide, 7 left-hand bends and 9 right-hand bends. It is a replica of the main circuit.
- Dirt circuit for car-cross, flattrack and supermotard: 1.100 km (0.684 mi) long and 12 m (39 ft) wide.
- Drift and road safety school: It has an area of 18.000 m^{2} (193.75 sq ft) of asphalt.
- Museum, helipad, infirmary, restaurant, multipurpose rooms and 18 professional boxes.

== Events ==
In 2024, the Aspar Circuit was used as the venue for the karting and cross car events of the FIA Motorsport Games.
