= Muscat Speedway =

Motorsport circuit in Oman

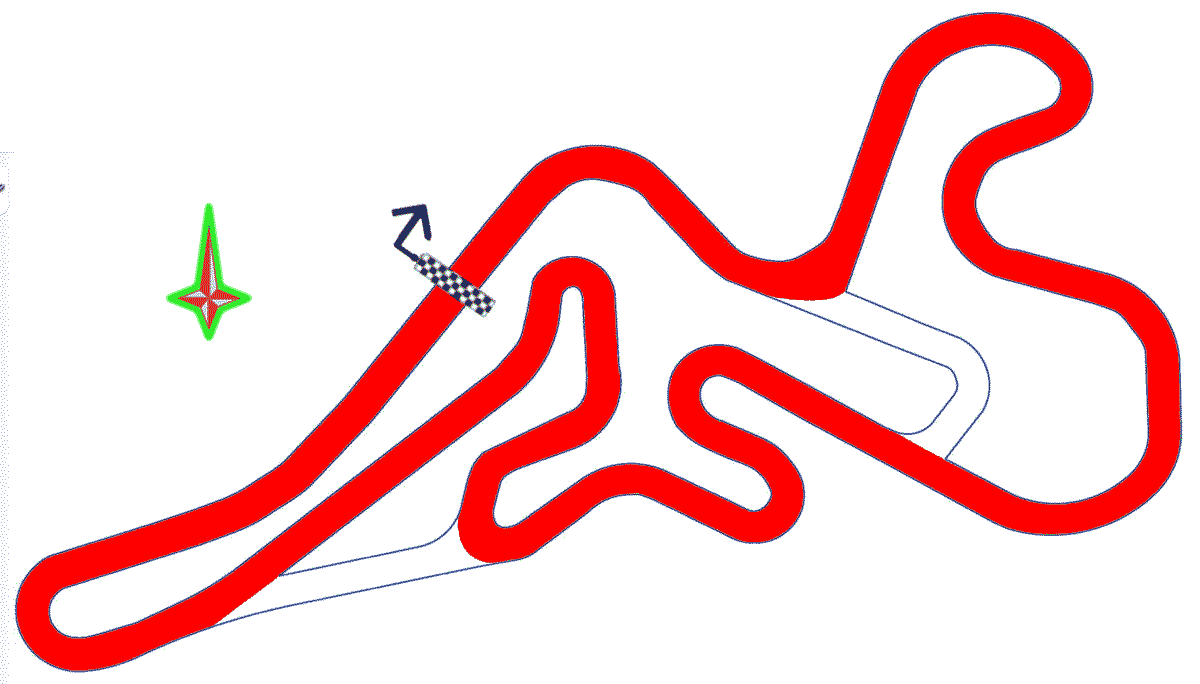
- International Circuit (2012–present)
- Location: Muscat, Oman
- Coordinates: 23°34′58.8″N 58°19′13.8″E
- Capacity: 1,000
- Opened: 1979

International Circuit (2012–present)
- Surface: Asphalt
- Length: 1.15 km (0.71 miles)
- Turns: 17

The Muscat Speedway (also Oman Automobile Club Kart Track) is a motorsport circuit located in the Omani capital Muscat. It is located about 2 km (1.2 mi) southeast of Muscat International Airport and is the first and to date only permanent motorsport racetrack in the country.

== History ==
Muscat Speedway was built in 1979 and its route was fundamentally revised in 2012.

== Layout ==
The longest version of the circuit is 1.15 km (0.71 mi) long and is nine meters wide. Two short connections allow the configuration of up to four different route variants - the 1.15 km (0.71 mi) long International Circuit, the National Circuit, the Classic Circuit and the Short Circuit. A grandstand in the pit lane offers space for up to 1,000 spectators.

== Events ==
National and international karting competitions from sprint races to 24-hour races take place on the track. In addition, occasional drift competitions and rallycross races are also held on the track.
