= Rotax Max =

Two-stroke 125cc kart racing engine

The Rotax Max 125 Engine is a two-stroke 125 cc (7.6 cu in) engine designed by Rotax, part of Bombardier Recreational Products (BRP), to provide cost-effective but high speed kart racing. Built in Austria, the engine is liquid cooled, equipped with a balance shaft, integrated water pump, electric starter and centrifugal clutch. Its combination of onboard electric starter and centrifugal clutch simplifies its operation. This concept is called TaG (Touch-and-go).

The Rotax Max was introduced to karting in 1998, easy to use and very reliable, it almost immediately began to gain market share from other slower or more expensive classes. The engine is offered in different performance configurations.

== Engine versions ==
There are several different versions of the engine. The original has a power valve and produces around 30 hp (22 kW), and is used by racers aged 15 or older. The DD2 is another fully powered version which has two gears and is direct drive in that the axle goes through the engine without need for a chain.

125 MAX EVO "base" configuration:

- 24 kW (32 hp) at 11,500 rpm
- Maximum rpm 14,800 rpm.
- recommended as of 14 years (13 years if the driver turns 14 in the season)
- has a cylinder with exhaust valve

125 Junior MAX configuration:

- 17 kW (23 hp) at 8,500 rpm
- Maximum rpm 14,800 rpm
- recommended as of 12 years (11 years if the driver turns 12 in the season)
- has a cylinder without exhaust valve

125 Mini MAX engine configuration:

- 9.6 kW (12.9 hp) at 7,500 rpm
- Maximum rpm 12,500 rpm
- recommended for children from 10 to 13 years
- has a cylinder without exhaust valve, and intake and exhaust restrictors

125 Micro MAX engine configuration:

- 6 kW (8.0 hp) at 6,500 rpm
- Maximum rpm 12,000 rpm
- recommended for kids from 8 to 10 years
- same as previous with a different exhaust and radiator, No inlet restrictor, and acceleration stop sleeve, fitting smaller chassis adapted to kids size

Based on an evolution concept, each of the above configurations can be upgraded or downgraded to any of the other configurations by replacing various accessories and components.

125 MAX DD2 engine configuration:

- 25 kW (34 hp) at 11,750 rpm
- Maximum rpm 14,000 rpm
- recommended as of 16 years
- has a two-speed gearbox operated by shift paddle from the steering wheel, and a chainless drive system

== Rotax Max Challenge ==
BRP-Powertrain has introduced a single (engine) brand race series for the MAX engine concept - called Rotax Max Challenge . This race series is organized in various classes (125 Micro MAX, 125 Mini MAX, 125 Junior MAX, 125 MAX and 125 MAX DD2) in around 60 countries. Competitors from the national Rotax Max Challenges in the 125 Junior MAX, 125 MAX and 125 MAX DD2 class can qualify to participate at the annual Grand Finals of the Rotax Max Challenge, where most of the costs are covered by BRP-Powertrain.

To assure the equal performance of the engines, BRP-Powertrain has established a very strict technical regulation and a sealing system for the engines. Only official service centers are authorized to check engines for their conformity and to seal them.

== CIK-FIA approval ==
In 2024, the Rotax Max lineup received CIK-FIA approval, validating its use in international competition.
