= Ellis Spiezia =

American electric racing driver

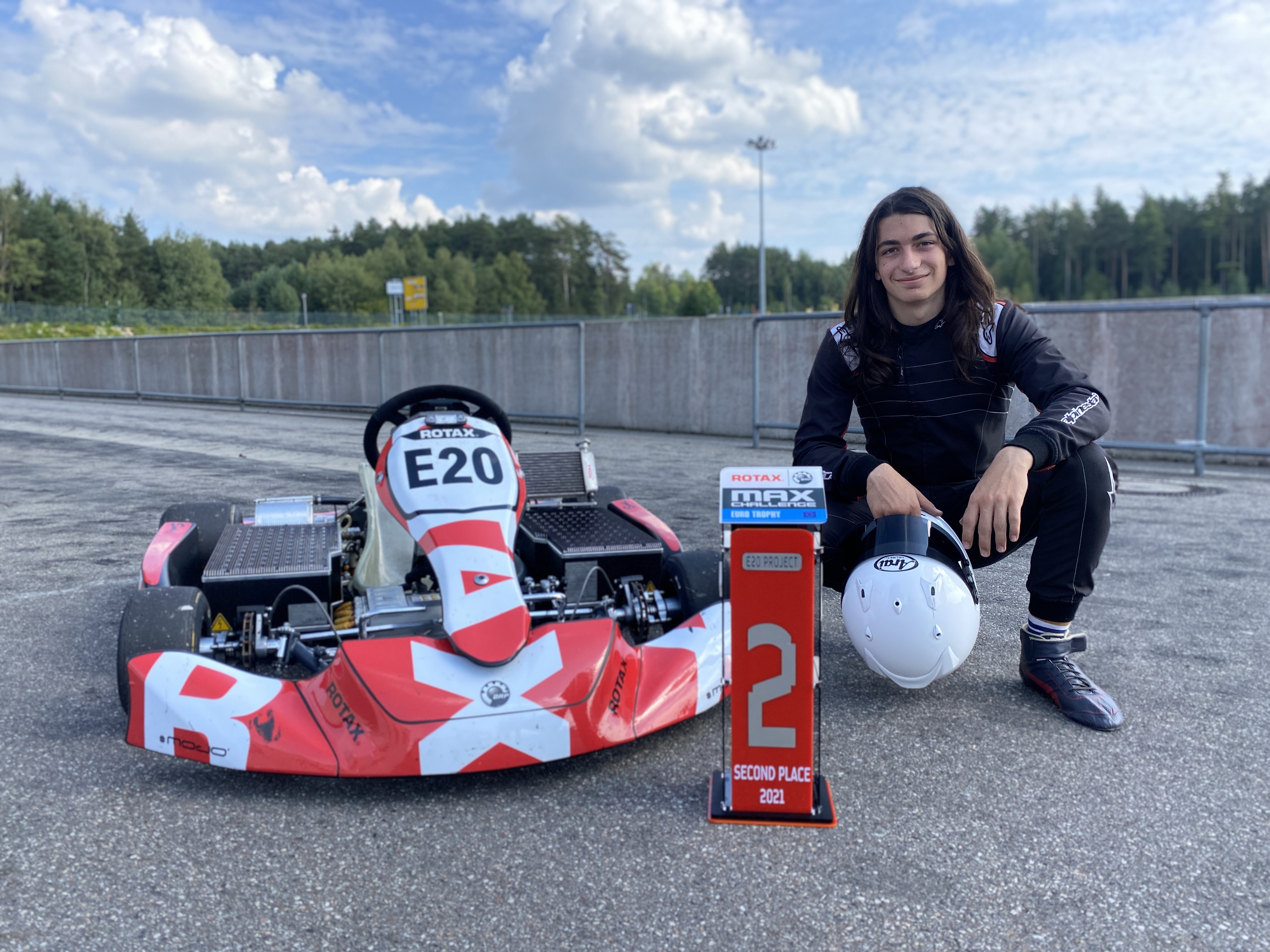
- Spiezia following his 2021 E20 result
- Nationality: (United States) American
- Full name: Ellis Spiezia

FIA RX2e Championship; Nitrocross NEXT Evo; career
- Current team: Ellysium Racing
- Former teams: ZEROID Motorsport (RX2e)
- Best finish: 2nd in 2021

Awards
- 2022 - BBC Green Sport Awards (nominee); 2024 - EVIE Awards, EV Under 30 Star (winner); 2024 - Global Sustainability & ESG (shortlisted); 2024 - Driver of the Month (September)
- Statistics up to date as of 2025.

Ellis Spiezia is an American racing driver who competes primarily in electric motorsport categories. He has raced in series including the Elektro-Kart Meisterschaft, Rotax Project E20 Euro Trophy, ERA Championship, Ford Fiesta Sprint Cup, NXT Gen Cup, Nitrocross and the FIA RX2e European Championship, achieving podium results and a vice-champion finish in Rotax Project E20. He has been recognised for his sustainability-focused approach to motorsport, including a nomination for the BBC Green Sport Awards Young Athlete of the Year in 2022 and winning the EVIE Awards EV Under 30 Star category in 2024.

== Early life and education ==
While living in New Jersey, Spiezia trained at local indoor karting facilities and participated in sim racing, which contributed to his early motorsport development. At age 16, he was described as a "talent at the service of the ERA Championship series" following his transition from karting into electric-racing formats.

In June 2020, Spiezia left mainstream schooling and adopted a self-directed learning approach, which allowed him to allocate additional time to his racing development and focus on electric-motorsport pathways.

== Career ==
Spiezia began his racing career at indoor karting facilities, first at RPM Raceway in Jersey City, New Jersey, and later at Autobahn Palisades. In 2019, he competed in an adult league at Autobahn Palisades, winning the championship and earning a place at the American E-Kart Championship (AEKC), a national indoor karting series.

Spiezia participated in several Lucas Oil Race School events, including the 2019 Scholarship Shootout. In September 2019, he attended the Play & Drive inaugural electric karting event in Aragon, Spain driving prototype electric racing karts. He finished fifth overall later that year.

In 2020, during the COVID-19 pandemic, Spiezia competed in the Deutsche Elektro-Kart Meisterschaft (DEKM), an electric kart championship in Germany.

Spiezia returned to Europe in 2021, continuing in the DEKM and racing in the Rotax Project E20 Euro Trophy, where he finished second overall and claimed his first competitive karting victory in Mülsen, Germany. He also test-drove the ERA Championship car, promoted as the world’s first electric junior formula car Later in 2021, he competed in the Yacademy F4 Winter Series in the United States, finishing fifth overall. He also participated in the Yacademy F4 Winter Series in the US in December 2021, where he finished fifth overall.

In 2022, Spiezia raced in the ERA Championship, earning the series’ first pole position. He finished fourth in the inaugural race after leading early before a mechanical failure. He also competed in the Ford Fiesta Sprint Cup in Belgium, finishing third overall and second in the junior category.

In 2023, Spiezia joined the inaugural NXT Gen Cup as the series’s first international driver, competing in the all-electric LRT NXT1 touring car. He scored multiple race wins, including at the Falkenberg world premiere, and finished third in the drivers’ championship.

In March 2024, Spiezia made his rallycross debut in the Nitrocross NEXT class at the season finale. He finished fourth in the first race of the weekend and rolled during the final lap of the second race while taking the joker lap. Later that year, Spiezia was the first driver confirmed for the fourth season of the FIA RX2e Championship, making his rallycross debut with ZEROID Motorsport at Essay, France, in June. He raced for ZEROID Motorsport, part of QEV Technologies.

In 2024, Spiezia was announced as Team Principal of Ellysium Racing in the eSkootr Championship, leading the Electric Renegades squad. The role marked his first move into team management alongside his driving career, with eSC highlighting his background in electric karting, development driving and Nitrocross as preparation for the position.

== Career summary ==
Season	Series	Team	Position
2019	American E-Kart Championship	Autobahn Palisades	12th
2019	Play & Drive Electric Karting Event (Aragon)	Play & Drive	5th
2020	Deutsche Elektro-Kart Meisterschaft (DEKM)	-	10th
2021	Deutsche Elektro-Kart Meisterschaft (DEKM)	-	5th
2021	Rotax Project E20 Euro Trophy	Rotax	2nd
2021	Rotax E20 - Mülsen (single event)	Rotax	1st
2021	Yacademy F4 Winter Series	-	5th
2022	ERA Championship	-	4th (best race finish)
2022	Ford Fiesta Sprint Cup Belgium	-	3rd (overall)
2023	NXT Gen Cup	-	3rd (overall)
2024	Nitrocross - NEXT class (single event)	-	4th (race result)
2024	FIA RX2e European Championship	ZEROID Motorsport	-

== Awards and recognition ==
- 2022 - BBC Green Sports Awards Young Athlete of the Year (Nominee)
- 2024 - Racing Driver Directory Driver of the Month (September)
- 2024 - Global Sustainability & ESG Awards - Future Leader (Shortlisted)
- 2025 - EVIE Awards, EV Under 30 Star (Winner)

== Advocacy, climate work and public speaking ==
Outside racing, Spiezia is involved in climate-related advocacy. He has been named an EcoAthletes Champion and is a member of High Impact Athletes, using his motorsport profile to promote climate action and electric mobility. He has appeared at sustainability-focused events such as Sustainability LIVE and has discussed topics including net-zero, electric vehicles and “passive activism” in interviews and panel sessions.

== See also ==
- Electric motorsport
- 2022 ERA Championship
- Electric go-kart
