= Kart circuit =

Race track designed for kart racing

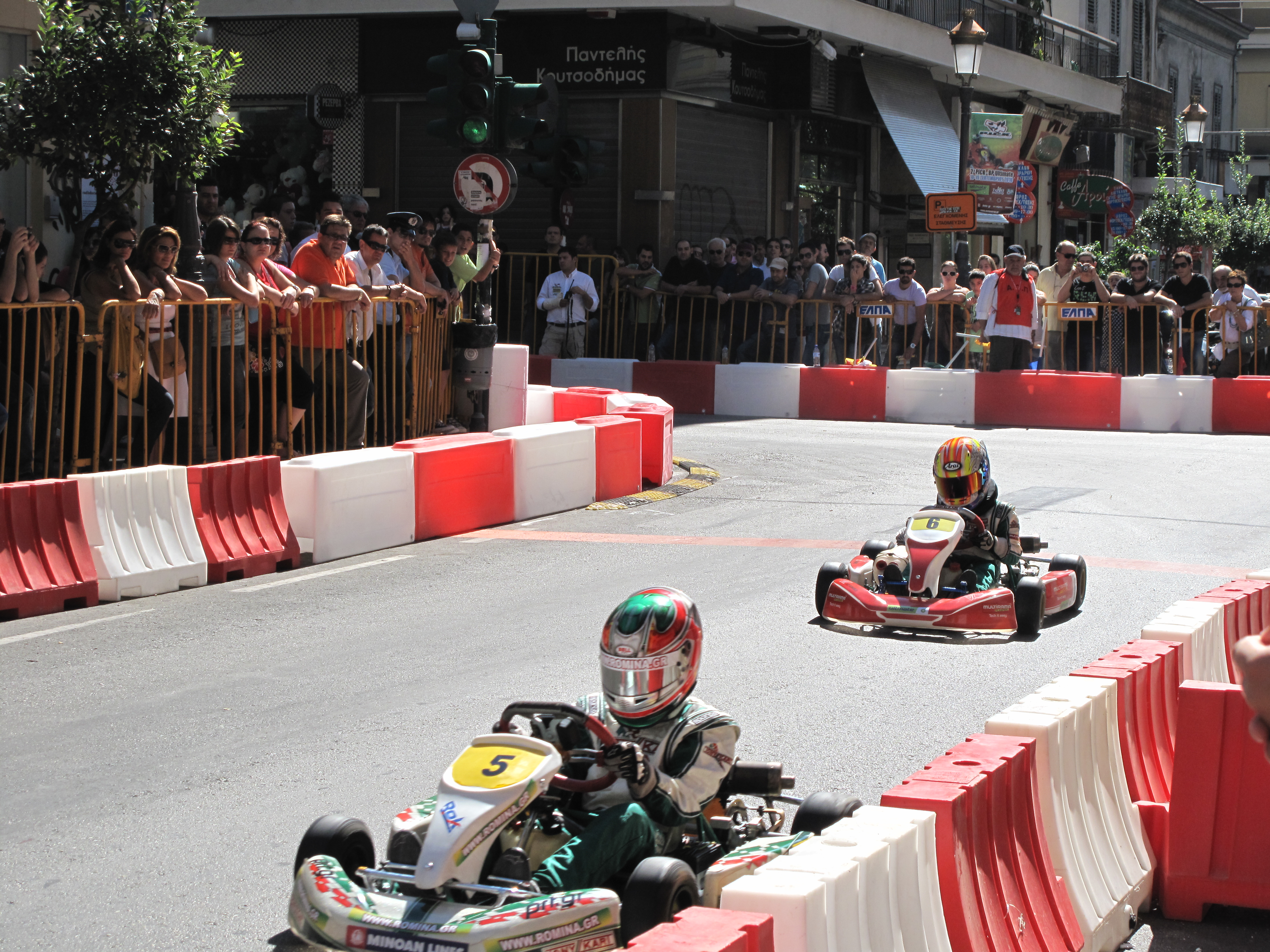
Temporary circuit in the streets of Patras

A kart circuit is a race track designed for kart racing or other forms of short-length motor racing, such as small-scale motorcycle racing, pocketbike racing, or radio-controlled model racing. There are several types of kart circuit, depending on the type of use desired.

Unlike regular race tracks intended for auto racing or other forms of motorsports, kart circuits are usually much shorter in length, narrower, and contains numerous turns or corners.

== Circuit types ==
=== Short circuit ===
A short circuit is defined as being an outdoor circuit of less than 1,500 meters in length .

The average length for a serious racing track for karts is around 1,100 - 1,200 meters, 7 to 9 meters in width. Normally custom-built for karting, they resemble road courses, with left and right turns. They generally allow sprint racing for both gearbox and non-gearbox karts.

Temporary circuits can be set in city streets or large parking lots for special events. This is the case for the Junior Monaco Kart Cup, a prestigious event for young drivers taking place each year in the city of Monaco, and the SKUSA SuperNationals, taking place in Las Vegas at the Rio All Suite Hotel and Casino.

=== Long circuit ===
A long circuit is defined as being an outdoor circuit of more than 1,500 m in length. Typically they are shared for other motorsport and only have gearbox kart races.

This type of event can see karts (Superkart) reach speeds in excess of 160 mph (250 km/h).

=== Indoor ===
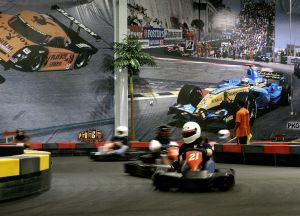
Indoor track in Florida

Normally for casual racers, the indoor circuits can be in any closed space (often old factories), sometimes with a short outdoor section to add interest. Normally they have their own fleet of Go-karts or micro karts, chosen more for economy than out-and-out speed.

In Europe, indoor karting is where most people will sample their first time in a kart. Indoor karting exploded across the UK in the 1990s and had a similar impact in European countries such as France and Belgium. It has made a lesser impact in the United States. Indoor karting still offers a competitive experience for all levels of racers.

The world's longest indoor circuit, the Highway Kart Racing GmbH, 1,600 meters, is located in Dortmund, Germany.

=== Others ===
In this category fall the dirt-tracks, oval tracks and ice rinks.

=== Locations ===
Karting is international and most countries have kart specific racing circuits. Notable examples are included below.

Latvia

- Swedbank kartodroms

UK

- Bayford Meadows
- Buckmore Park Kart Circuit
- Daytona Motorsport
- Mansell Raceway Kart Circuit
- Clay Pigeon Raceway

USA

- K1 Speed
- RPM Raceway
- Supercharged Entertainment
- Andretti Indoor Karting & Games
- Full Throttle Adrenaline Park

Italy

- South Garda Karting
- Circuito Internazionale Napoli
- Franciacorta Karting Track
- Adria International Raceway
- Kartodromo La Conca

Indonesia

- Sentul International Karting Circuit

Thailand

- Bira Kart Circuit
