= Electric go-kart =

Small electric powered vehicle

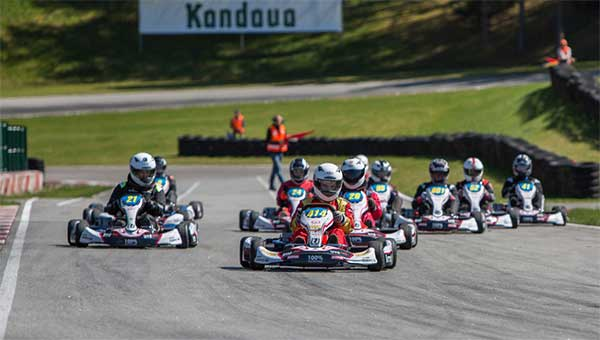
From the world's first national championship in electric go-karts (Latvia, 2018).

An electric go-kart is a type of go-kart powered by electric motors and batteries or supercapacitors, as opposed to a traditional petrol engine.

As of 2022, electric go-karts are mostly used for rental go-karts for recreational usage. For serious kart racing, traditional 2-stroke petrol engines are mostly used, but development of high-performance electric karts is taking place and races are already being held with electric go-karts.

In 2018, the FIA and the International Olympic Committee joined forces to introduce electric karting as the first motorsport in the Youth Olympics, with the aim of having the first championship at the 2024 Summer Olympics in Paris.

== History ==
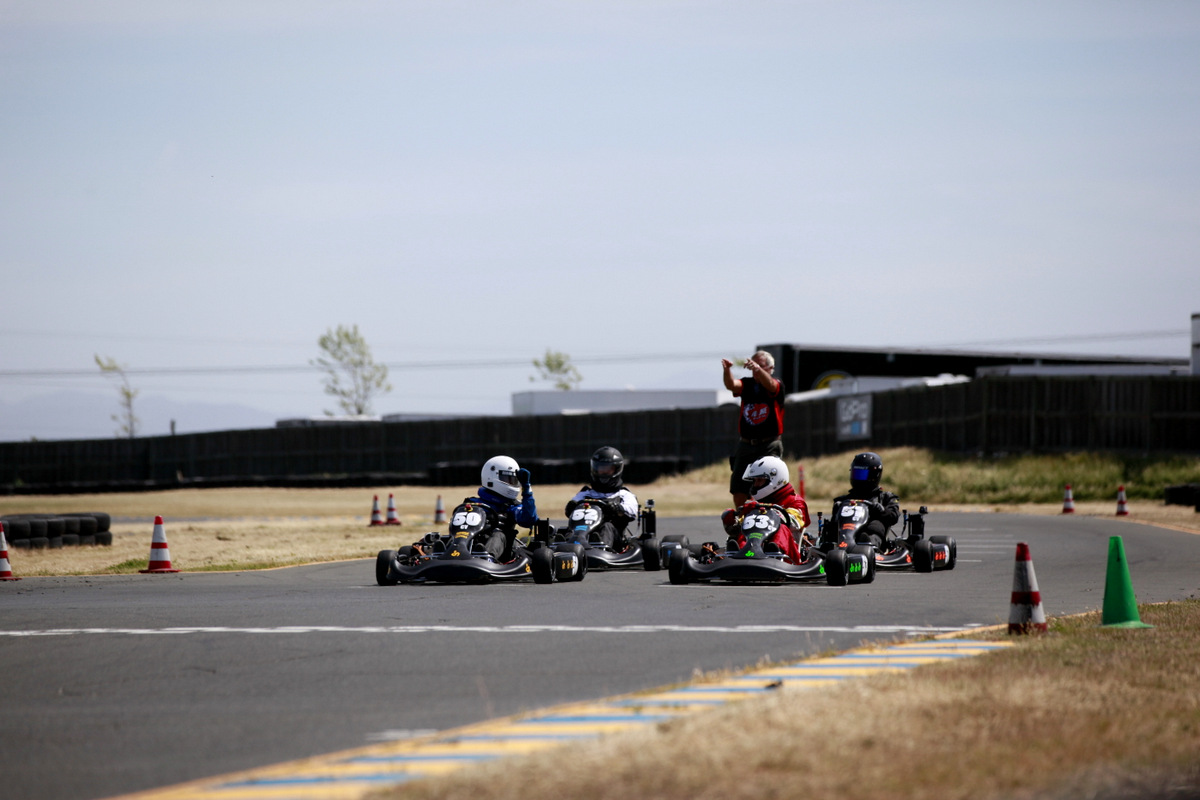
Race with electric go-karts at Sonoma Raceway in USA, 2013.

Since 2006, a race for students called e-Kart has been organized in France, which brings together manufacturers, schools and academic institutions in areas such as electrical and mechanical engineering. It is driven using motors with power from 10 to 67 kilowatts. The event runs over three days and includes the disciplines of endurance racing, fastest lap time, fastest acceleration from standstill over a distance of 50 meters, 10-minute races, and more. From 2013, the event became international, bringing together 26 teams with 34 karts and 200 participants.

In 2012, the ERDF Masters Kart race took place at the Paris-Bercy Arena in Paris, France, with racing drivers from various series such as Formula 1, GP2, WRC, DTM, IndyCar and kart racing. They competed with electric karts powered by 30 kW brushless motors.

In 2013, the Red Line Oil Karting Championship started in Northern California in the USA. The competitions took place under Category V, Group 2, Class 1 of the Rattlesnake Electric Sport Championship. In most race weekends, lap times were set less than one second behind the fastest petrol cars.

In 2015, the Latvian company Blue Shock Race launched electric go-karts. The BSR2017 was one of the company's first rental go-karts that had a lithium battery, and could be driven for 10-15 minutes before needing to be charged.

In 2016, the street race G-Zero Championship Racing Series was held in Canada. The karts used were built by EVC Racing in Indianapolis, and was built partly using motorcycle parts.

== Competitions ==
=== The first championships ===
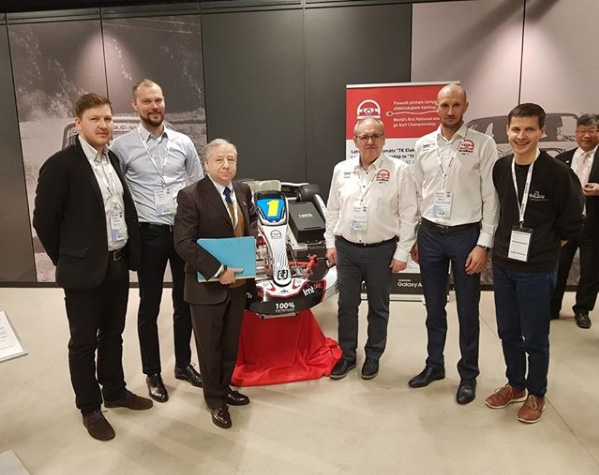
FIA president Jean Todt attends the announcement of the Latvian National Championship.

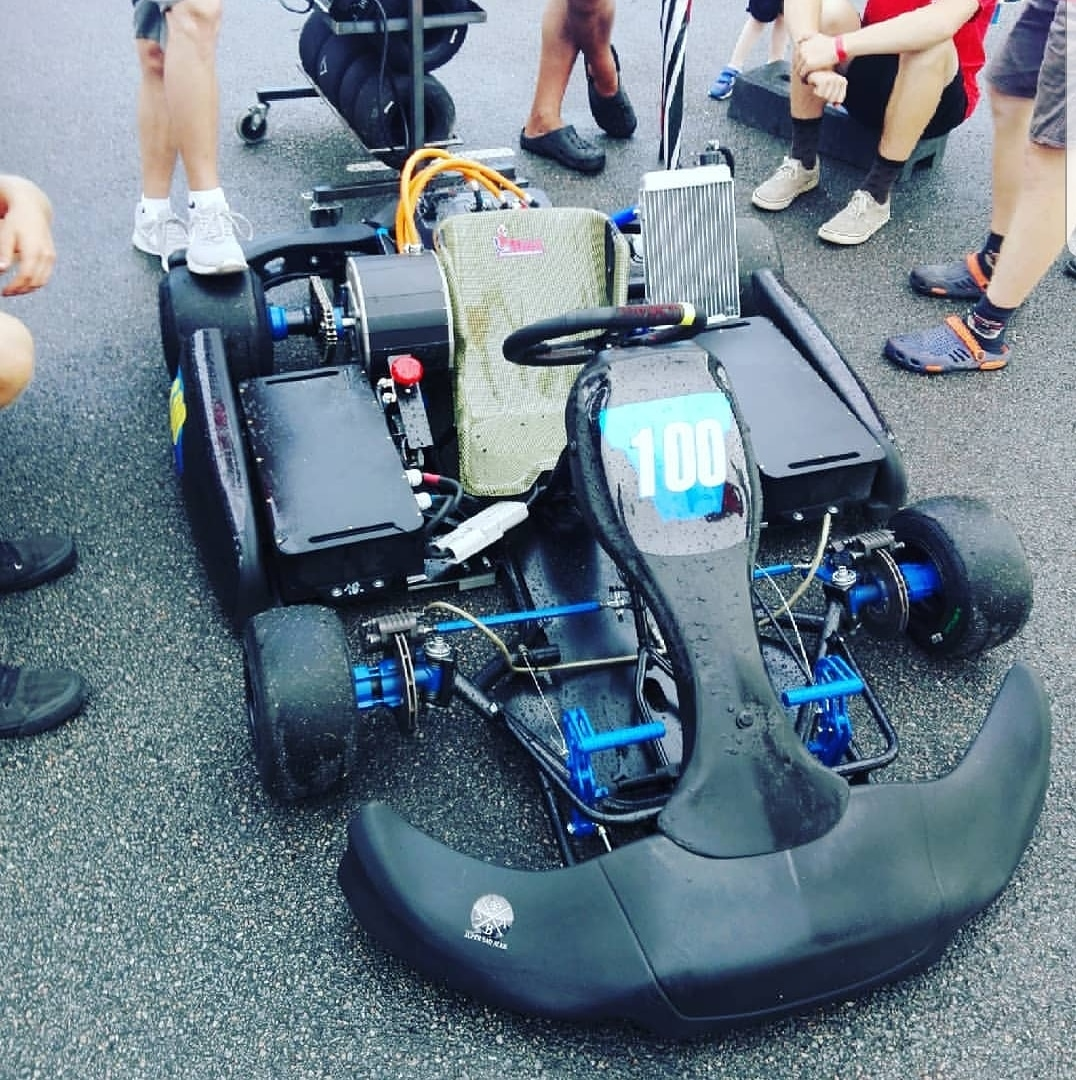
An electric go-kart made by Blue Shock Race, which allegedly should be able to compete with petrol karts in the DD2 division.

On 1 May 2018, Latvia held the world's first national championship for electric go-karts using the TeK and TeK Open classes. The first race was held at the Kandavas track, and the season consisted of a total of 6 races at different tracks ending at the Jelgava track. 10 teams with 16 different participants from Lithuania and Latvia took part. All used engines and drivetrains from Blue Shock Race with an engine power of 15 kW in the Tek class and 25 kW in the TeK Open class, respectively. Ričards Irbe took gold with 5 wins in a row, while Raivis Veiksans took second and Raistis Plukss third. During the Championship the best lap time was shown by Raivis Veiksans at 49.836 seconds.

Soon after, on 13 May 2018, the German Motorsport Association opened the first German national championship for electric go-karts. The season consisted of five races from May to September.

In 2018, the FIA and the International Olympic Committee joined forces to introduce electric karting as the first motorsport in the Youth Olympics, with the aim of having the first championship at the 2024 Summer Olympics in Paris.

In 2021, Rotax introduced the Project E20 kart into their Euro Trophy Championship. In 2021, Ellis Spiezia, dubbed 'The Electric Renegade,' became Vice Champion of the inaugural series.

Additional championships and competitive electric karts have been developed by Global Karting League (formerly Total Karting Zero), founded by ex-F1 engineer Rob Smedley, Play & Drive, a Spanish startup, and Kinetik, based in Varna, Bulgaria.

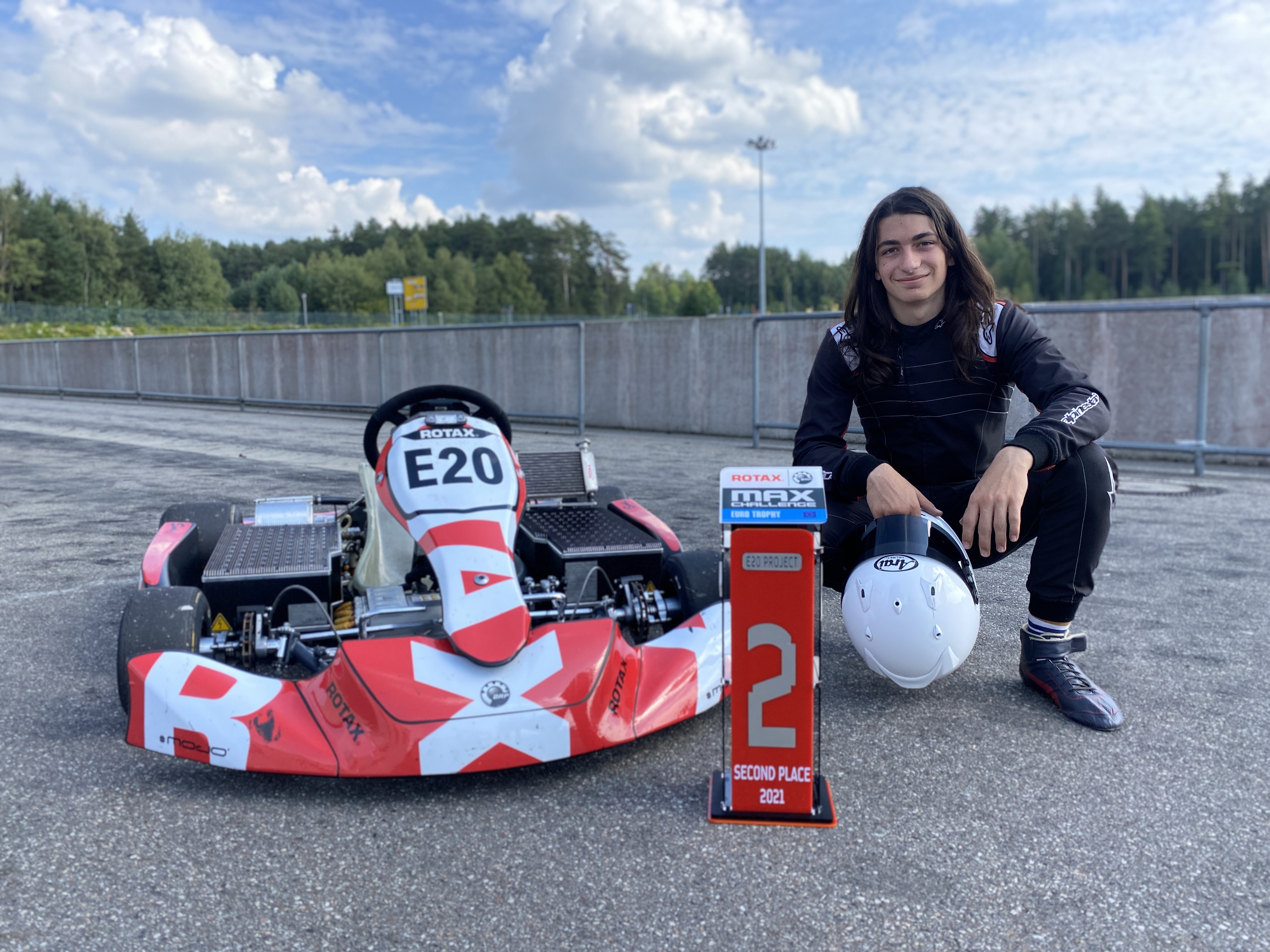
Ellis Spiezia, 2021 Rotax E20 Vice Champion, Euro Trophy

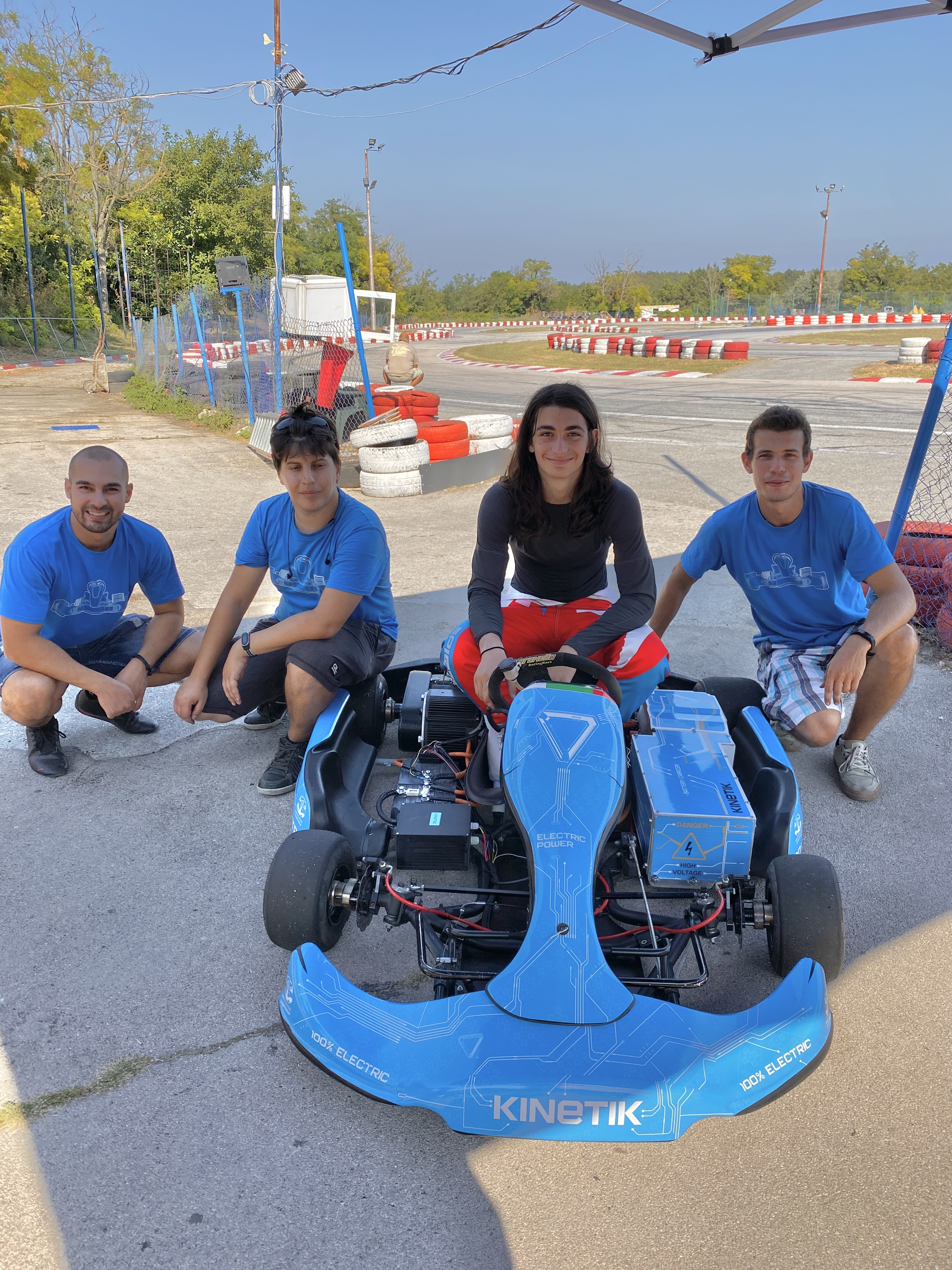
The Kinetik prototype development team and test driver, Ellis Spiezia.

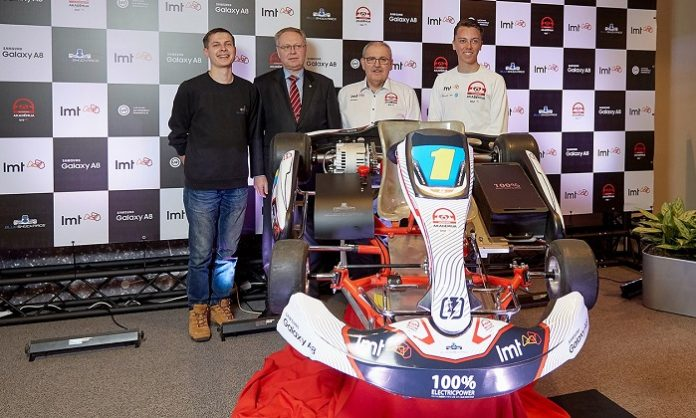
Electric go-kart from the first Latvian national championship

=== Technical development ===
It has been reported that Blue Shock Racing is working on developing a new racing kart with engine power of up to 55 kW. This should make it possible to accelerate from 0-100 km/h in approximately 2.2 seconds, which will make this class the top professional class in terms of acceleration (over the current KZ2 which has an acceleration from 0-100 km/h in 3 seconds) .

In October 2023, Blue Shock Race set a world record, recording a maximum speed of 163 km/h (101.3 mph), solidifying its position as the fastest commercially available electric racing kart in the world.

=== Homologation ===
At the fourth race of the first season of the Latvian championship, Blue Shock Race launched a model that should be capable of competing with existing petrol karts in the DD2 division.

In Latvia, a national class called TeK Open is homologated where it is allowed to compete with up to 25 kW engine power. As of 2019, several other national electrical divisions were added.

== Technical ==
Electric go-karts do not emit exhaust, and therefore require less ventilation when driving indoors. They also emit less noise. Some disadvantages are that the batteries are heavy, that charging time may take long and that the performance can get poor when the battery is running low.

=== Power and torque ===
Electric motors usually have greater torque than an equivalent petrol engine, and therefore usually have better acceleration from a standstill than conventional go-karts with a petrol engine.

Electric motors usually also have a much wider torque band, and therefore, like other electric vehicles, eliminates the need for a gearbox with multiple gears in order to produce sufficient power at different speeds.

=== Batteries ===
Some common battery types on electric go-karts are:

- Lead–acid battery, mostly used only on recreational karts
- Lithium polymer (LiPo), used on both recreational and competition karts
- Lithium-ion (Li-ion), also used on both recreational and competition karts
- Supercapacitors can be used to provide power peaks and quick-charging so that a smaller battery can be used, making for a lighter overall energy carrier package

Recreational go-karts with lead batteries can usually be driven for a maximum of 20-30 minutes before a low battery charge results in noticeably less performance. For this reason, most electric competition go-karts use lithium-polymer or lithium-ion batteries that provide better performance and last longer.

=== Safety ===
On electric go-karts, the safety of the batteries largely depends on the type of battery:

- Lead-acid batteries are relatively safe, and cannot catch fire or explode during collisions. However, they have poorer performance.
- LiPo and Li-ion batteries have the potential to catch fire or explode if they are damaged, such as during a collision.

On go-karts with petrol engines, the petrol tank can be punctured in accidents and there is a risk that the contents will catch fire (the risk of explosion with petrol, on the other hand, is very small).

=== Price ===
Electric motors and batteries are usually more expensive to purchase than conventional petrol motors, especially motors powered by lithium batteries.

Despite less need for maintenance, electric go-karts usually have higher costs for operation and maintenance, as batteries and electric motors are typically more expensive than that of conventional engine, especially those powered by lithium batteries.

== See also ==
- Electric car
- Formula Student
- Kart racing
- KZ2, the second fastest KZ class in karting
