= Kandavas Kartodroms =

Karting circuit in Latvia

Coordinates: 57.031203°N 22.794571°E

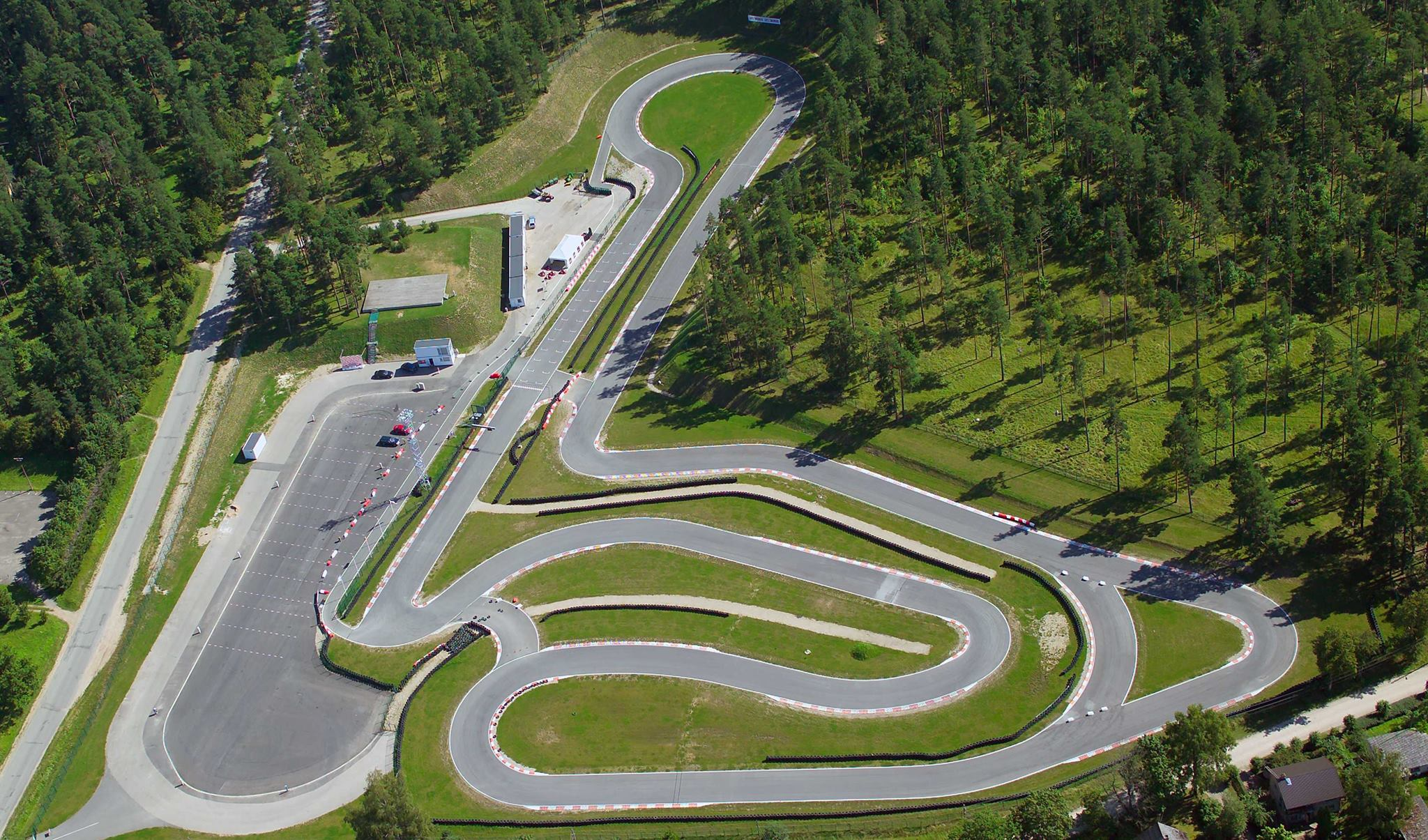
- Aerial image of Kandavas Kartodroms karting track
- Location: Kandava, Latvia
- Major events: Latvian and Baltic karting championships
- Website: http://www.kartodroms.lv
- Length: 1.012 km (0.629 miles)
- Turns: 11
- Race lap record: 0:41.513 (Kaspar Kallasmaa, {{{record_team}}}, 2014)

Kandavas Kartodroms is a karting circuit in Kandava, about 100 km West of Riga, the capital of Latvia. The track was built in 1972 and completely redesigned and rebuilt in 2008 according to CIK-FIA standards. The architect of the reconstruction was Hermann Tilke, author of many top level racing circuits worldwide.

== History ==
The track is 1,012 meters in length with 11 turns. It can be used in both directions, and there are three shortcuts that make it possible to change the track's configuration. One of its corners is named after Tilke. Two others after partners “Skonto Būve” and “Energoremonts Rīga”. The track from 1974 up to 1990 was the base of the USSR national karting team. During that period in guidance of the trainer Hugo Jurševskis many high level karting drivers grown up. Hugo Jurševskis now is the technical director of the track. After reconstruction the track is hosting national and international karting events, such as Latvian and Baltic championship. The track is also open for hobby and rental kart drivers.

== Technical data ==
- Total area: 4.45 ha
- Track length: 1,012 m
- Width: 8 m
- Curves: 11
- Parking area for teams: 8,536 m²
- Terrain: Maximum climb and fall of 5.5%
- Maximum steepness of curve: 10%
- Start-finish line: 154 m

== See also ==
- Kart circuits
