= Micro kart =

A micro kart, also known as a bambino kart in the United Kingdom, is a small, one-passenger mini go-kart. These karts typically have two-stroke engines, ranging in size from 22.5 cc to 85 cc, and putting out anywhere from 1.2 hp to over 20 hp, or an electric motor with rechargeable lithium-ion batteries.

== Types ==
=== Lower-class micro karts ===
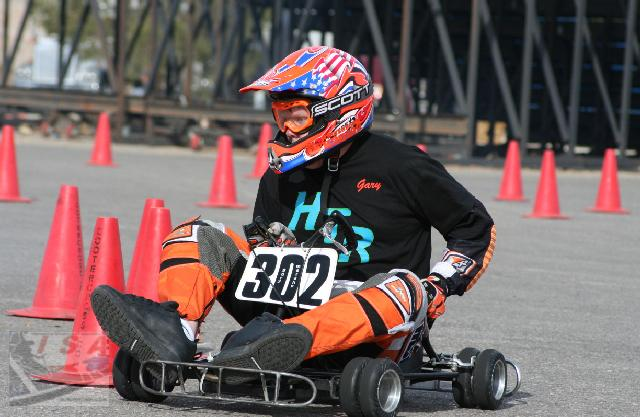
A Go-Ped Go-Quad modified for racing

The lower-end karts weigh anywhere from 37 to 42 pounds and have solid rubber tires of 4.5 to 6 inches diameter. An exception to these specifications is the Go-Ped Trail Ripper Quad, an off-road kart that weighs 80 pounds and features 11-inch off-road tires. They typically have engines ranging from 22.5 cc to 45.7 cc in size, but engines up to 61.5 cc can be purchased from aftermarket sources. These karts usually reach speeds from 18 to 30 mph in stock form, and are primarily used by private parties for recreational riding, but are also raced in racing organizations such as the former International Scootercross Association. Two examples of these types of karts are the Bladez Powerkarts and the Go-Ped Go-Quads.

=== High-power micro karts ===
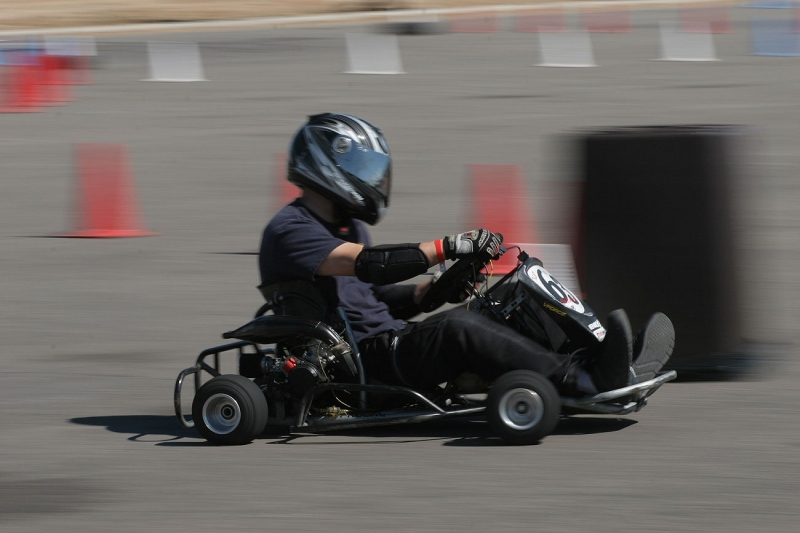
A BoXer MRB

The larger class karts have 9-inch or 10-inch pneumatic tires and weigh in between 60 and 80 pounds. They typically have motors ranging from 39 cc to 85 cc, and travel in between 30 and 70 mph. These karts are commonly used in racing organizations across the country. An example of this is the BoXer MRB line, which are built to the customer's specifications.

== See also ==
- Kart racing
