= 2022 ERA Championship =

Motor racing championship

The 2022 Software AG ERA Championship, formally known as the 2022 Electric Racing Academy Championship was a motor racing championship for open wheel, all-electric formula racing cars. This was the inaugural and so far, final season of the championship. It became a one-race championship at Circuit Zolder after many scheduling issues.

== Teams and drivers ==
All drivers competed with identical Mitsu-Bachi F110E chassis based on the Dome F110 Formula 4 chassis, powered by a 130KW motor, with a 24KWh battery and Goodyear tires.

No.	Driver
2	(United Kingdom) Richard Morris
3	(France) Cameron Hawes
4	(Belgium) Wout Colson
5	(Belgium) Milan de Laet
6	(Belgium) Michelangelo Amendola
7	(Belgium) Christiaan Spelmans
8	(Netherlands) Bob Stevens
11	(United States) Ellis Spiezia

== Race calendar ==
On 14 January, the provisional calendar was announced. The series supported the 2022 FIA ETCR - eTouring Car World Cup at all of its races. On 22 February 2022, it was announced that Istanbul Park would host the first round instead of the Istanbul Street Circuit. On 17 May, it was announced that Istanbul FIA ETCR round was postponed to November due to the organizational issues, so Istanbul ERA round was also postponed. Only practice sessions were held at Hungaroring and Circuito del Jarama. The round of the championship at Vallelunga Circuit was cancelled on 19 July due to logistical problems.

Round		Circuit	Date	Pole position	Fastest lap	Winning driver
1	R1	(Belgium) Circuit Zolder	10 July	(United States) Ellis Spiezia	(Belgium) Michelangelo Amendola	(France) Cameron Hawes

== Championship standings ==
Points were awarded to the top 10 classified finishers in each race.

Position	**1st**	**2nd**	**3rd**	**4th**	**5th**	**6th**	**7th**	**8th**	**9th**	**10th**
Points	25	18	15	12	10	8	6	4	2	1

=== Drivers' Championship ===
Pos	Driver	BEL (Belgium)	Pts
Pos	Driver	R1	Pts
1	(France) Cameron Hawes	1	25
2	(Belgium) Milan de Laet	2	18
3	(Netherlands) Bob Stevens	3	15
4	(United States) Ellis Spiezia	**4**	12
5	(Belgium) Michelangelo Amendola	5	10
6	(Belgium) Christiaan Spelmans	6	8
–	(United Kingdom) Richard Morris	DNS	–
–	(Belgium) Wout Colson	WD	–
Pos	Driver	R1	Pts
Pos	Driver	BEL (Belgium)	Pts

Colour	Result
Gold	Winner
Silver	Second place
Bronze	Third place
Green	Points classification
Blue	Non-points classification
Blue	Non-classified finish (NC)
Purple	Retired, not classified (Ret)
Red	Did not qualify (DNQ)
Red	Did not pre-qualify (DNPQ)
Black	Disqualified (DSQ)
White	Did not start (DNS)
White	Withdrew (WD)
White	Race cancelled (C)
Blank	Did not practice (DNP)
Blank	Did not arrive (DNA)
Blank	Excluded (EX)

**Bold** – Pole
Italics – Fastest Lap

== See also ==
- Electric Motorsport
