= Go-kart =

Small four-wheeled vehicle

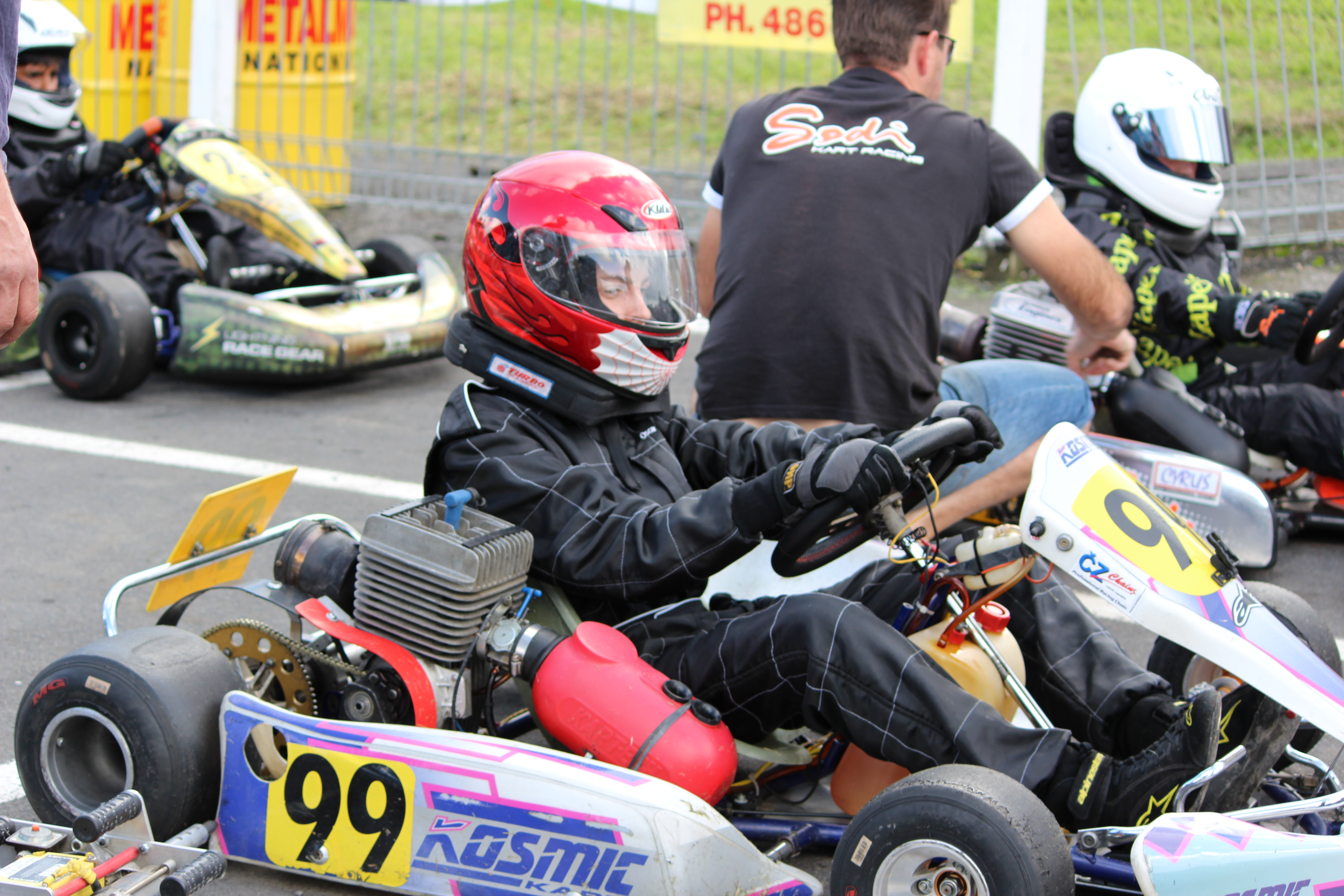
A driver with a 2008 Kosmic TS28 on the grid at KartSport Mt Wellington, New Zealand

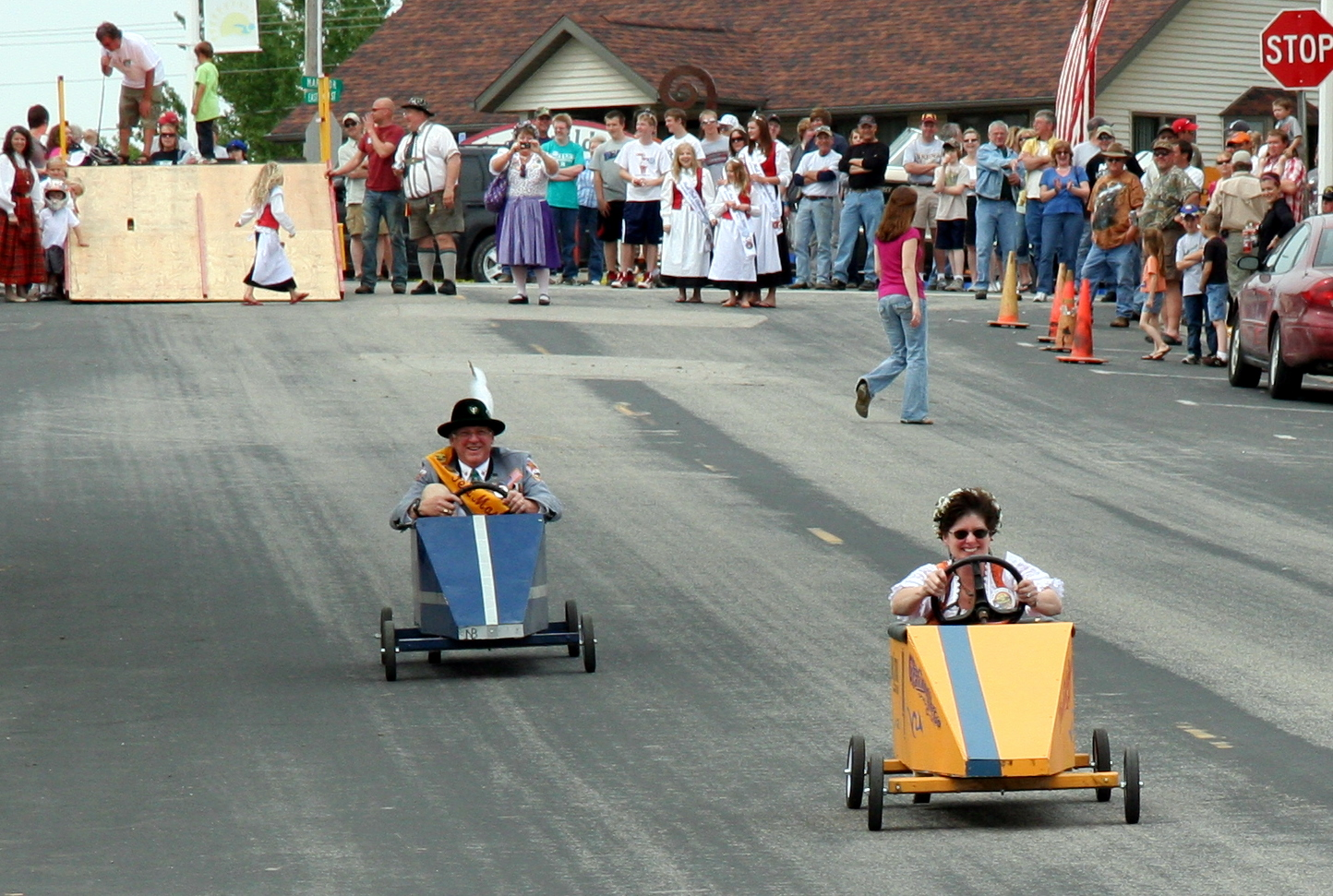
Soap Box Derby at a community celebration in Minnesota

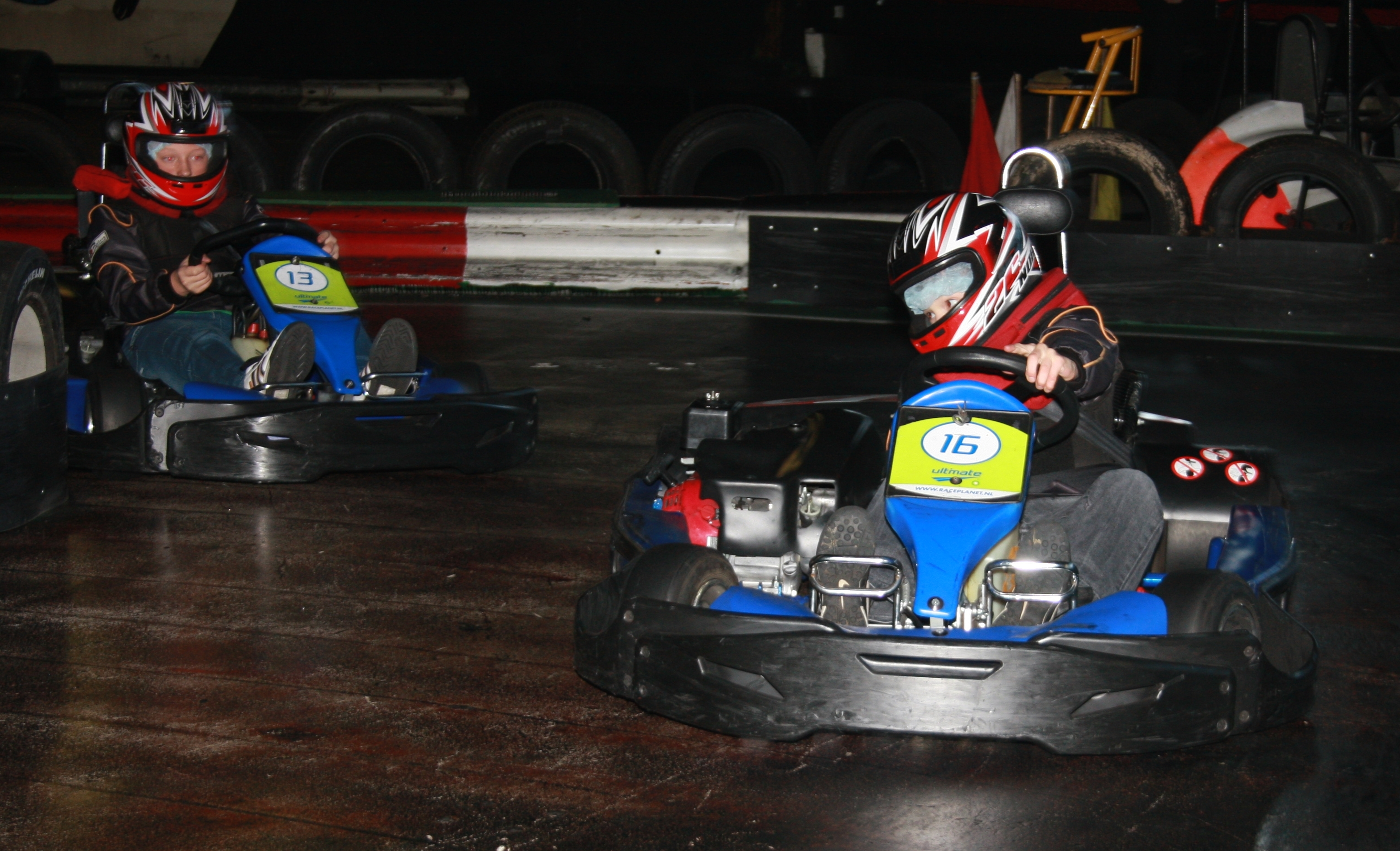
Indoor kart rental

Go-kart on a track in Kanagawa, Japan

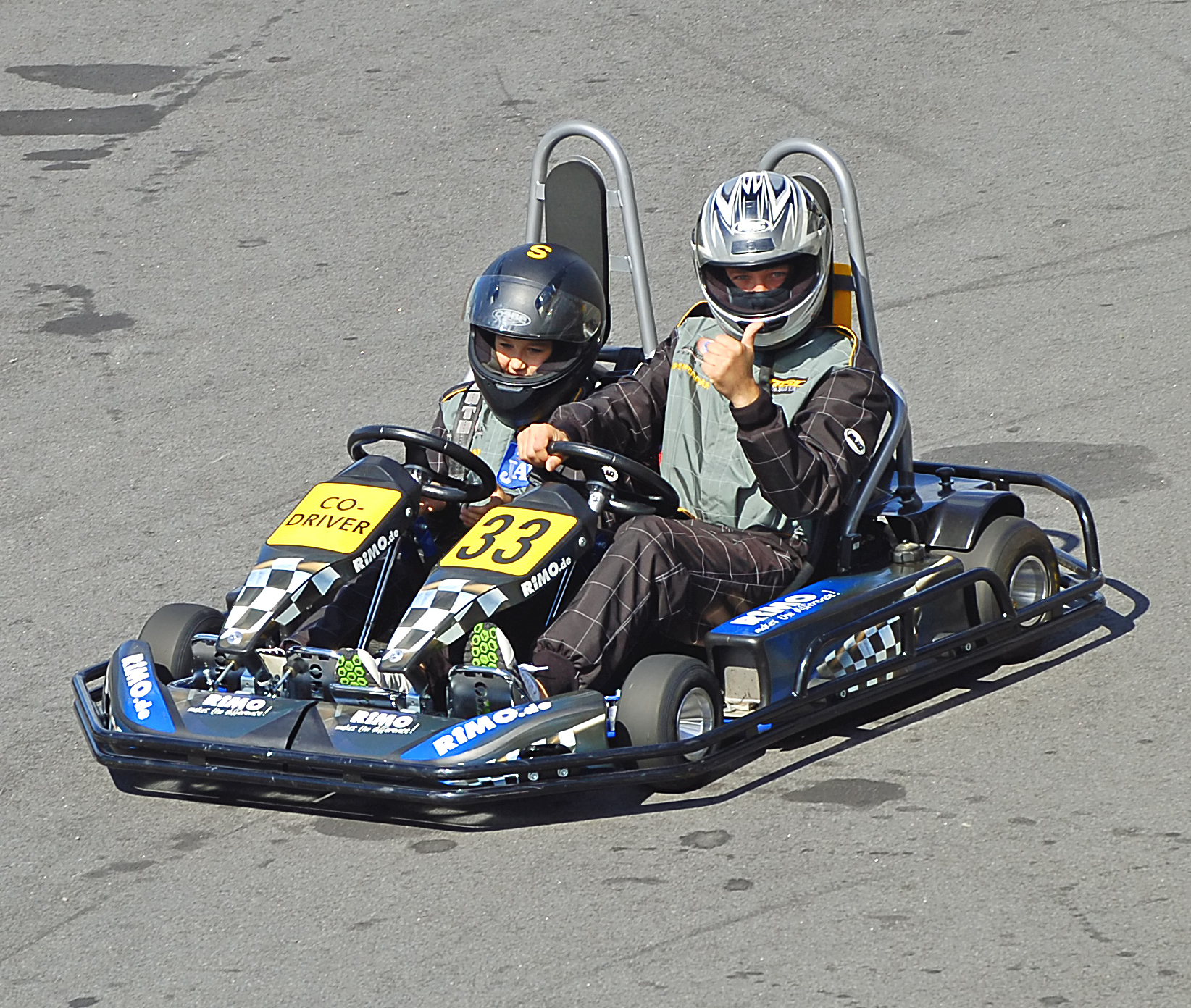
A two-seater rental

A go-kart, also written as go-cart and often referred to as simply a kart, is a type of small four-wheeled vehicle. Go-karts come in many shapes and forms, from non-motorised models to high-performance racing karts and electric-powered models.

Art Ingels created the first motorised go-kart in Los Angeles in 1956.

== Predecessors ==
The exact origin of the term is unclear. One of the first appearances of the term is an 1885 painting by the Scottish artist Hugh Cameron's "The Go-Cart". It is also unclear why the C was later changed to a K. In the film The Ivory-Handled Gun (1935), the crippled father of Buck Jones refers to his wheelchair as a "go cart". Charles Dickens also used go-cart in Master Humphrey's Clock and Other Stories when talking of his travel to Italy. In Genoa, he talks about "a man without legs, on a little go-cart".

Robert Smith Surtees used go-cart before 1835 in Surrey Shooting: Mr. Jorrocks in Trouble, originally published in the "New Sporting Magazine". "'We'll take a coach to the castle,' said Jorrocks, 'and then get a 'go-cart' or a cast somehow or other to Streatham, for we shall have walking enough when we get there."

Gravity racers are a form of non-motorised go-kart. These are karts which are propelled by gravity and have no pedals or engines and are often simplistic, homemade and used for either recreational or competitive use. These are often referred to as soapbox cars in North America, however other regional variations such as billy carts (Australia) are common.

Other forms of non-motorised go-karts (ie. quadracycles) may also be propelled by means such as bicycle pedals (such as in the form of a velomobile).

== Components ==
=== Chassis ===
The chassis are made of chromoly tubing. There is no suspension, so chassis have to be flexible enough to work as a suspension and stiff enough not to break or give way on a turn. Kart chassis are classified in the United States as "Open", "Caged", "Straight" or "Offset". All Commission Internationale de Karting–, Fédération Internationale de l'Automobile–, or CIK-FIA-approved chassis are "Straight" and "Open".

- Open karts have no roll cage.
- Caged karts have a roll cage surrounding the driver; they are mostly used on dirt tracks.
- In Straight chassis, the driver sits in the center. Straight chassis are used for sprint racing and endurance racing.
- In Offset chassis, the driver sits on the left side. Offset chassis are used for left-turn-only speedway racing.

The stiffness of the chassis enables different handling characteristics for different circumstances. Typically, for dry conditions, a stiffer chassis is preferable, while in wet or other poor traction conditions, a more flexible chassis may work better. Temperature of the track can also affect handling and may prompt additional chassis adjustments. The best chassis allow for stiffening bars at the rear, front and side to be added or removed according to race conditions.

Braking is achieved by a disc brake mounted on the rear axle. Front disc brakes are used in most shifter kart classes and are increasingly popular in other classes; however, certain classes do not allow them. Shifter karts have dual master cylinders, one for the front and one for the rear, and are adjustable to allow for front/rear bias changes.

Professionally raced karts typically weigh 165 to 175 lb (75 to 79 kg), complete without driver. Avanti, Tony Kart, Trulli, Birel, CRG, Gillard, Intrepid, Remo Racing, Kosmic, Zanardi or FA Kart and EKS are a few well-known examples of the many European manufacturers of race-quality chassis. Emmick, Coyote, Bandit, Shadow, MGM, Titan, PRC and Margay are American companies producing kart chassis.

=== Engines ===
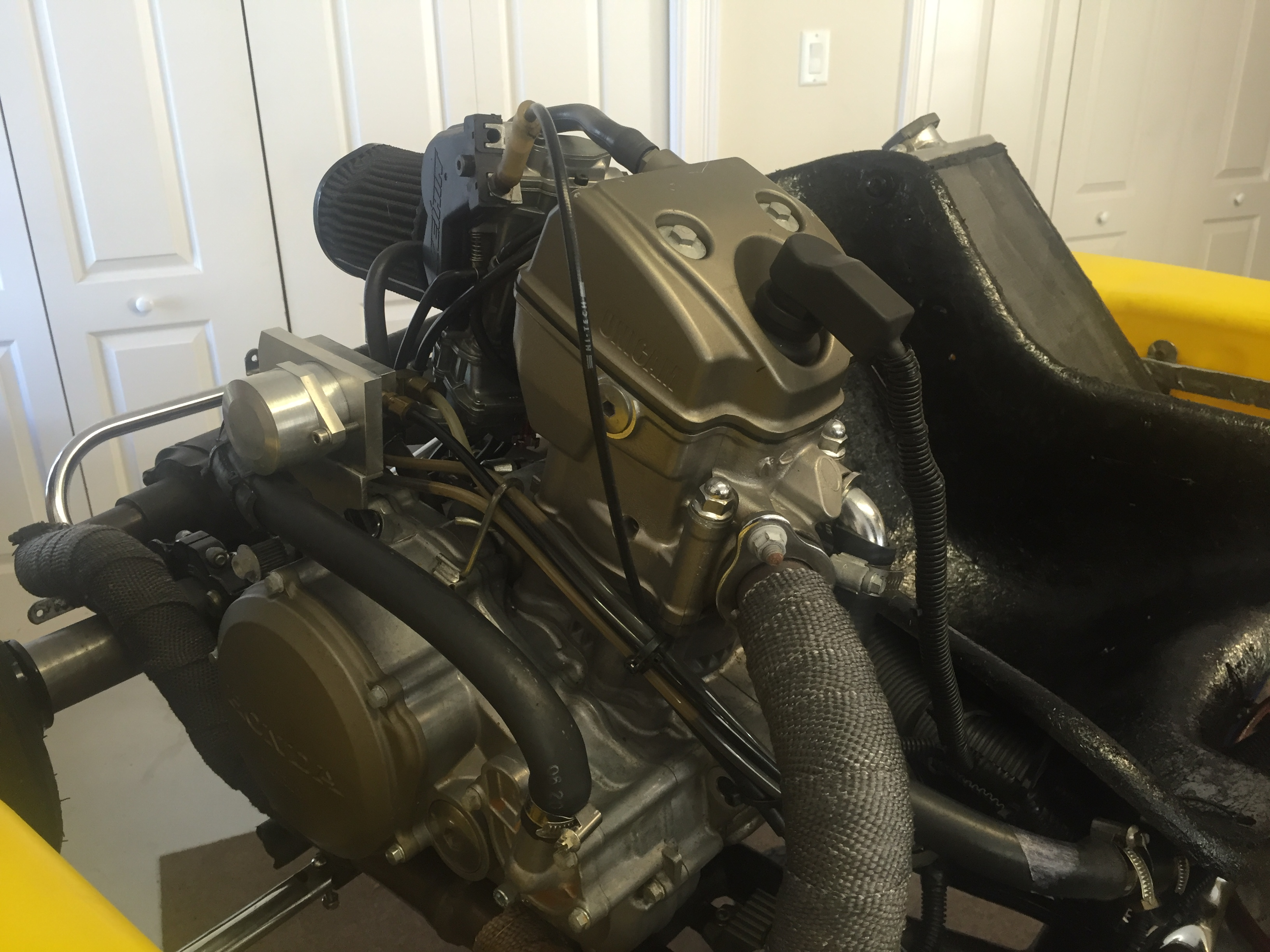
Shifter kart engine

Racing karts mostly use small two-stroke or four-stroke engines; however, as of 2022, there has been small-scale adoption of electric motors in racing karts.

- Four-stroke engines can be standard air-cooled industrial based engines, sometimes with small modifications, developing from about 5 to 20 hp (4 to 15 kW). Manufacturers of such engines are Briggs & Stratton, Kohler, Robin, Honda, and Torini. They are used in both lower-level racing (particularly introductory junior categories) and rental kart applications. There are also more powerful four-stroke engines available from manufacturers like Yamaha, TKM, Swissauto or Aixro (Wankel engine) offering from 15 hp up to 48 hp. They run to and around 11,000 rpm, and are manufactured specifically for karting. Those are used in some National Championship classes like the two-strokes.
- Two-stroke kart engines are developed and built by dedicated manufacturers. ROTAX, WTP, Comer, IAME (Parilla, Komet, Woltjer), TM, Vortex, Titan, REFO, Modena Engines, TKM, Yamaha, KTM, Biland, or Aixro (Wankel engine) are manufacturers of such engines. These can develop from about 8 hp for a single-cylinder 60 cc unit (MiniROK by Vortex) to over 90 hp for a twin 250 cc. PRD makes the PRD Fireball, a two-stroke engine delivering 28.5 hp (21 kW) at 15,580 rpm. The most popular categories worldwide are those using the TaG 125 cc units like the 125cc Rotax Max. The recent 125 cc KF1 engines are electronically limited at 16,000 rpm. Most are water-cooled today; however, previously air-cooled engines dominated the sport.
- While electric motors have been used in low-performance amusement park karts—particularly in indoor applications where fumes are a concern - higher-performance competitive racing karts are now commercially available but not very widespread. Electric go-karts require only that the batteries of the karts be plugged into an array of chargers after each run. Since they are pollution-free and emit no smoke, the racetracks can be indoors in controlled environments. Electric karts powered by lead-acid batteries can run a 20–30 minutes before the performance is affected, while those powered by lithium batteries may last up to 2 hours on a single charge. Some karts have been fitted with hydrogen fuel cells. High-performance electric go-karts for amusement parks and indoor tracks may have external electronic controls in the event of an accident or other hazards, in which the track attendant or the race referee can remotely slow down or stop all vehicles on the track via radio control. This external control can also be used to limit young riders to a slower operating speed for safety, while a race consisting only of adults is permitted a higher speed. These speed controls can be applied to both electric and combustion-engine karts. Manufacturer Blue Shock Racing offers electric karts for junior and senior competitors with performance comparable to combustion-powered karts, and has held race series for them. Combustion kart engine maker Rotax offers an electric kart motor and has held racing events for karts fitted with it.

=== Transmission ===
Purpose of transmission: There are three reasons for having a transmission in the automotive power train or drive train. The transmission can:

- Provide torque needed to move the vehicle under a variety of road and load conditions. It does this by changing the gear ratio between the engine crankshaft and vehicle drive wheel.
- Be shifted into reverse so the vehicle can move backward.
- Be shifted into neutral for starting the engine and running it without turning the drive wheels.

Karts do not have a differential or a transmission. The lack of a differential means that one rear tire must slide while cornering. This is achieved by designing the chassis so that the inside rear tire lifts up slightly when the kart turns the corner. This allows the tire to lose some of its grip and slide or lift off the ground completely.

Power is transmitted from the engine to the rear axle by a chain. Both engine and axle sprockets are removable. Their ratio must be adapted to the track configuration to obtain the most performance from the engine.

In the early days, karts were direct-drive, requiring push starts. The inconvenience of that configuration led to the centrifugal clutch for the club-level classes. Dry centrifugal clutches are now used in many categories; Rotax Max is one example. They have become the norm as the top international classes have switched to 125 cc clutch-equipped engines as of January 2007.

=== Tires ===
Wheels and tires are much smaller than those used on a normal car. Wheels are made of magnesium alloy, aluminum, or composite materials. Tires can support cornering forces in excess of 2 g (20 m/s²), depending on chassis, engine, and motor setup. Some car tire manufacturers, such as MG Bridgestone, Dunlop, Hoosier, and Maxxis make tires for karts. There are also specific kart tire manufacturers, which include MG, Vega, MOJO, LeCont, Cobra, and Burris.

Similarly to other motorsports, kart tires have different types for use appropriate to track conditions:

- Slicks, for dry track. Slick kart tires come in many different compounds, from very soft (maximum grip) to very hard (amusement and rental karts, less grip but long life span). In international level racing, because the drivers are free to choose their tires and because of the short duration of each round (10 to 20 minutes maximum), these are some of the softest tires found in motorsport.
- Rain tires, or "wets", for wet weather. They are grooved, made of soft compound, and are narrower than slicks. Not all racing classes allow rain tires.
- Special, such as spiked tires for icy conditions, or "cuts/grooved" for high grip dirt/clay speedways. Cuts are slicks modified with a lathe to optimize handling. Tire manufacturers such as Hoosier and Burris also make a slightly larger grooved tire only used in dirt track racing.

=== Data acquisition ===
As in other motor sports, several data acquisition systems have been developed for kart racing. These systems allow the driver to monitor from a display fixed on the steering wheel some parameters such as RPM, timing of laps (including sectors), number of laps, best lap, cooling system temperature, exhaust gas temperature and sometimes speed or even gear for shifter karts.

Some of those systems are able to record (logging) laps data from the sensors, allowing replay of an entire running session or/and direct download to a personal computer equipped with a data analysis software. More sophisticated systems allow for more information such as lateral and longitudinal acceleration (g-force), throttle position, steering wheel position and brake pressure.

== Uses ==
In some countries, go-karts can be licensed for use on public roads often referred to as street tracks. Typically there are some restrictions; in the European Union, a go-kart modified for use on the road must be outfitted with headlights (high/low beam), tail lights, a horn, indicators, and an engine not exceeding 20 hp (15 kW).

== Recreational, concession, and indoor karts ==
Besides traditional kart racing, many commercial enterprises offer karts for rent, often called "recreational" or "concession" karts. The tracks can be indoor or outdoor. Karts are rented by sessions (usually from 10 to 30 minutes) or on a day basis. They use sturdy chassis complete with dedicated bodywork, providing driver safety. Most of these enterprises use an "Arrive and Drive" format which provides customers with all the safety gear (helmets, gloves and driver outfits) necessary, and allow them to show up anytime to race, without the problem of having to own their own equipment and gear.

Outdoor tracks can offer low-speed karts strictly for amusement (dedicated chassis equipped with low powered four-stroke engines or electric motors), or faster, more powerful karts, similar to a racing kart, powered by four-stroke engines up to 15 hp (11 kW) and, more rarely, by 2-stroke engines, but designed to be more robust for rental use. Typically, outdoor tracks are also used for traditional kart races.

Indoor kart tracks can be found in many large cities in different parts of the world. These tracks are often located in refurbished factories or warehouses, and are typically shorter than traditional outdoor tracks. Indoor karts are usually powered by a four-stroke gasoline engine producing anywhere from 5 to 13 hp (4 to 10 kW), or sometimes by an electric motor. Many tracks offer competitive races and leagues. At the top level, an Indoor Karting World Championship (IKWC) exists.

There is a separate category of go karts in the powersports industry that includes off road go karts. These are similar to a miniature dune buggy. Off road go karts typically feature large tires, a full roll cage, heavy duty suspension, and features to protect the riders from wind and mud. There are no longer any American made offroad buggy brands due to legal issues, so all brands will come from China.

== See also ==
- Electric go-kart
- Model car
- All-terrain vehicle
- Golf cart
