= Kart racing =

Motorsport using go-karts

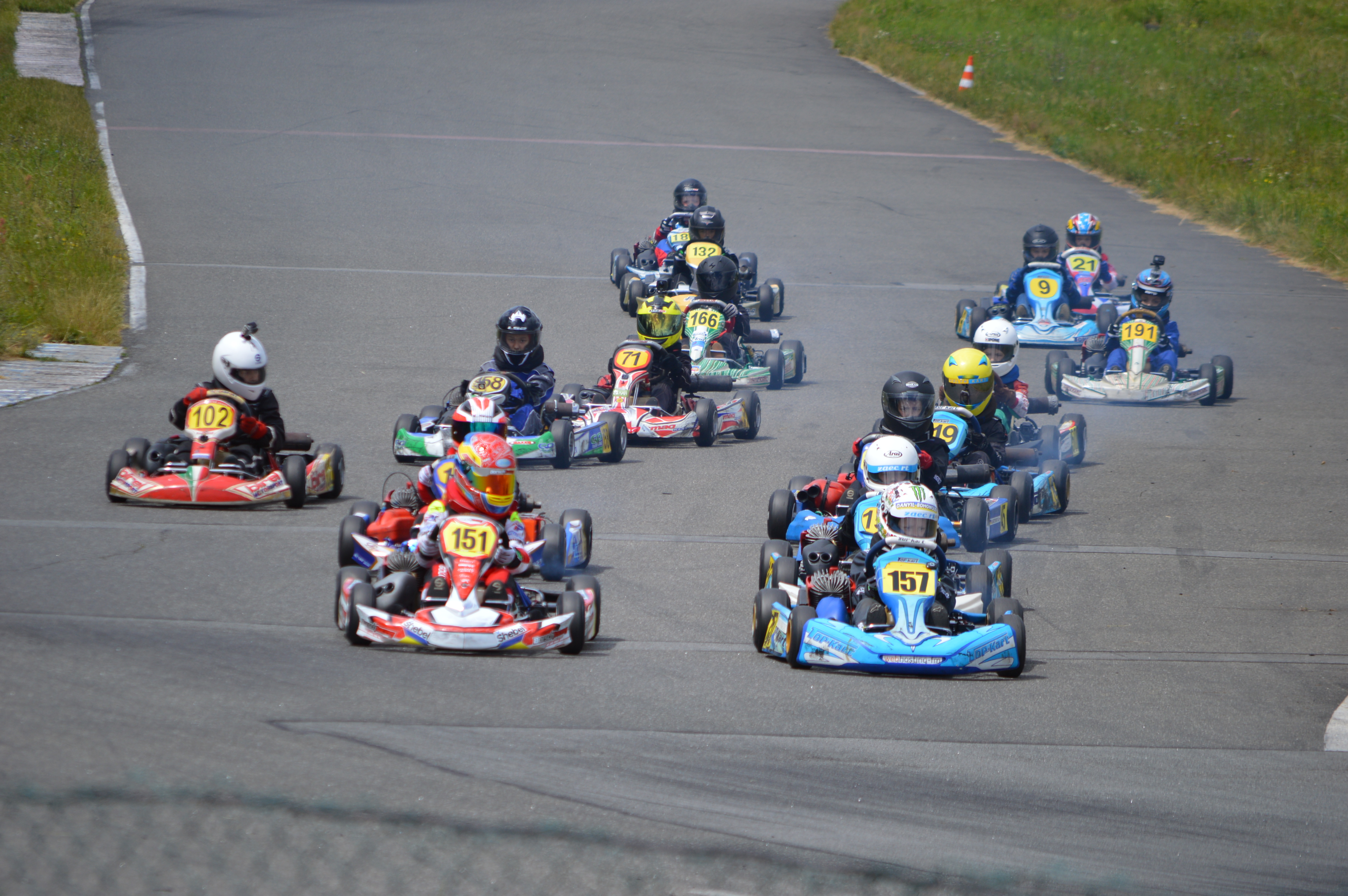
- A sprint race at a karting event
- Highest governing body: Commission Internationale de Karting
- First played: 1950s

Characteristics
- Contact: No
- Team members: Individual and team
- Mixed-sex: Yes
- Type: Motorsport
- Equipment: Racing kart
- Venue: Kart circuit

Presence
- Country or region: Worldwide
- World Championships: FIA Karting World Championship

Kart racing, commonly known as karting, is a form of motorsport using small, open-wheel, four-wheeled vehicles known as go-karts or racing karts. Kart races are usually held on dedicated kart circuits, although some forms of karting, including superkart racing, also take place on full-size motor racing circuits. Karts vary widely in speed and specification, from recreational rental karts to high-performance racing karts.

Karting is practised both recreationally and competitively. Competitive karting includes sprint, endurance, speedway, street and international championship formats, with classes commonly defined by driver age, engine type, chassis specification and weight. The sport is widely used as an early development category for drivers progressing into higher levels of car racing, although it is also contested as a discipline in its own right. Formula One drivers including Ayrton Senna, Michael Schumacher, Lewis Hamilton, Sebastian Vettel, Max Verstappen and Lando Norris began their careers in karting.

International karting is governed by the Fédération Internationale de l'Automobile through FIA Karting, while national and regional karting is administered by motorsport authorities and karting organisations in individual countries.

== History ==
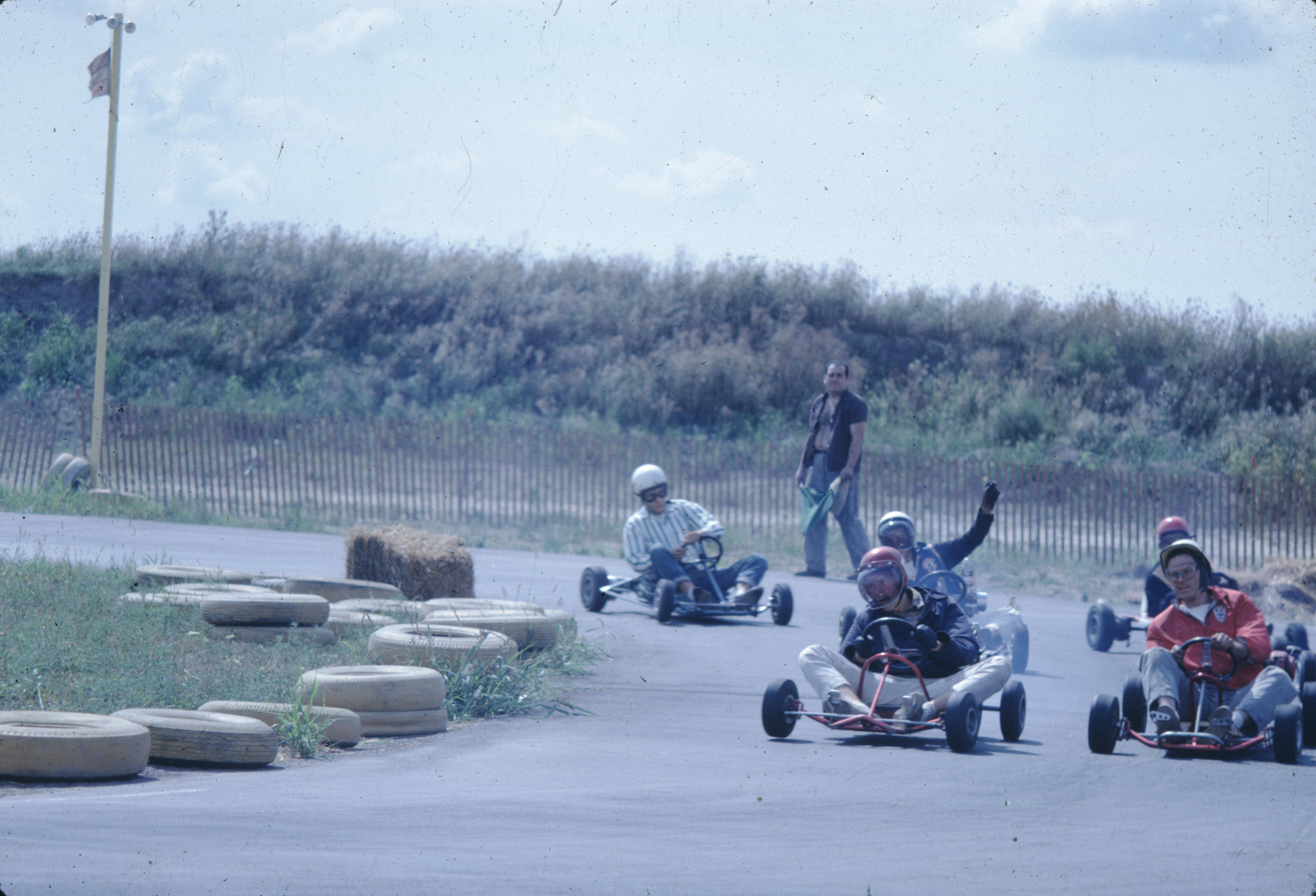
Kart racing in Illinois in 1962

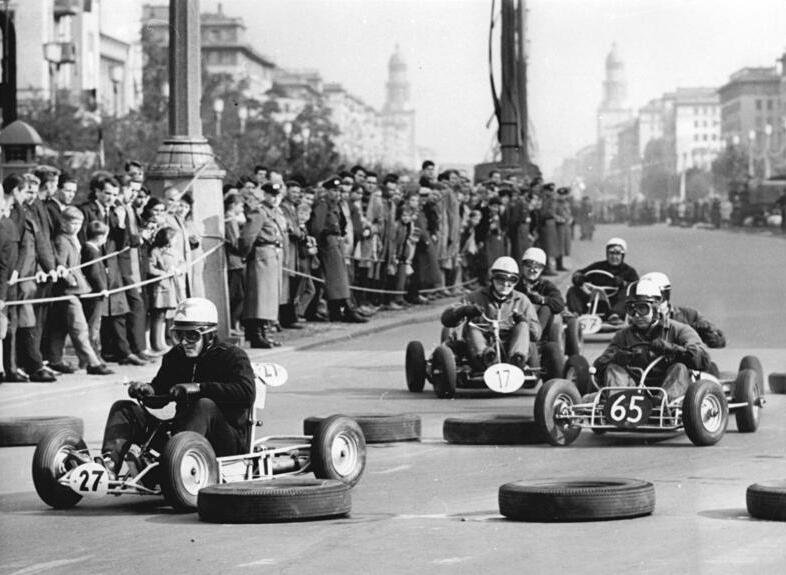
Kart racing in Berlin, East Germany, 1963

Modern karting originated in Southern California in the 1950s. American race-car builder Art Ingels, who worked for Kurtis Kraft, is widely credited as one of the creators of the first kart. FIA Karting records the first kart as the Caretta-West Bend, built in August 1956 in Glendale, California, by Ingels and Lou Borelli. The kart used a simple tubular frame and a small two-stroke West Bend engine.

Early karting developed as a grassroots activity in California. Ingels' prototype and other early home-built karts were driven in car parks, including at the Rose Bowl Stadium in Pasadena, before organised kart racing began to emerge. The sport spread rapidly in the United States and then to Europe during the late 1950s and early 1960s.

Early karts often used engines adapted from lawnmowers, chainsaws or motorcycles before specialist kart engines became more widely available. By the 1960s, dedicated kart chassis and engine manufacturers had emerged, including manufacturers in the United States and Europe. Italian engine and chassis manufacturers later became especially prominent in international karting.

International competition developed during the 1960s. The first Karting World Championship was held in 1964 under the international karting structure that later became associated with the Commission Internationale de Karting. European-level karting competition also developed during this period, with FIA Karting history recording the European Nations' Cup from 1962 and later individual European Championship competition.

Indoor karting emerged as a commercial and recreational form of the sport in the late twentieth century. The New York Times reported in 1995 that indoor karting had developed in London from the mid-1980s and had become popular during the 1990s.

== Organisation and governance ==
Kart racing is organised at international, national, regional, club and commercial levels. International competition is governed by the Fédération Internationale de l'Automobile through FIA Karting, while national and regional karting is administered by motorsport authorities, karting associations, sanctioning bodies, clubs and commercial organisers.

=== International ===
At international level, karting is governed by FIA Karting, historically known as the Commission Internationale de Karting. FIA Karting oversees international karting regulations and championships, including the Karting World Championship. International karting categories have included direct-drive karts, gearbox karts and superkarts.

=== United Kingdom ===
In the United Kingdom, karting is governed within the wider structure of Motorsport UK, the national governing body for four-wheel motorsport. Motorsport UK describes most karting as short-circuit racing, with more powerful superkarts, or long-circuit karts, also competing on full-size race tracks. Motorsport UK describes karting categories as including Cadet, Inter, Junior, Senior and Gearbox classes, with events commonly made up of practice, qualifying, heats and finals.

=== United States ===
In the United States, international motorsport representation is handled by the Automobile Competition Committee for the United States (ACCUS), the FIA-recognised national sporting authority for the country. Domestic kart racing is organised through a mixture of sanctioning bodies, national series, regional series and local clubs, rather than through a single national karting authority. Organisations and series active in United States karting include the World Karting Association, SuperKarts! USA and the United States Pro Kart Series.

=== Australia ===
In Australia, Karting Australia states that it is the sole body recognised by the FIA and Motorsport Australia to organise, regulate and control karting in Australia. Karting Australia states that authority to organise, control and regulate karting within Australia has been formally delegated to it through Motorsport Australia.

== Racing series ==
Kart racing is organised through a mixture of international championships, regional series, national championships, one-make engine series, rental-kart competitions and club-level championships. The following examples are not exhaustive, but illustrate how karting series are organised in different regions and countries.

=== International and global series ===
At international level, FIA Karting organises world and continental championships, including the Karting World Championship and FIA Karting European Championship events across direct-drive, gearbox and Superkart categories.

The Rotax Max Challenge is a global one-make karting structure using Rotax engines. Rotax describes the Rotax MAX Challenge as a mono-brand karting series with drivers competing in more than 60 countries, leading to the Rotax MAX Challenge Grand Finals. The Grand Finals bring together drivers who qualify from Rotax championships and events around the world, using equalised equipment supplied by the organiser.

Other international or global karting series and events include the ROK Cup Superfinal, which brings together drivers from ROK Cup national series around the world, and the Champions of the Future Academy Program, an arrive-and-drive international series using equalised equipment.

=== Europe ===
Europe has a large number of international, regional and national karting competitions, including FIA Karting events, manufacturer-supported one-make series and national championships. Series and events commonly contested in Europe include FIA Karting European Championship rounds, the Rotax Max Euro Trophy, IAME Euro Series, WSK events, Champions of the Future events, ROK Cup events and national championships in countries such as Italy, the United Kingdom, France, Germany, Spain, Belgium and the Netherlands.

In the United Kingdom, national karting includes outdoor championship structures under Motorsport UK and indoor or rental-kart competitions. Motorsport UK describes karting categories as including Cadet, Inter, Junior, Senior and Gearbox classes. British competitions include the British Kart Championships, Super One series, British Indoor Karting Championship and British Rental Kart Championship.

=== Americas ===
In the United States, domestic karting is organised through sanctioning bodies, national series, regional series and local clubs rather than a single national karting authority. Major organisations and series include the World Karting Association, SuperKarts! USA and the United States Pro Kart Series. The United States also has strong regional karting scenes, including sprint, shifter, road-racing, oval and dirt-karting formats.

Karting in the Americas also includes regional and national Rotax, IAME, ROK and Briggs & Stratton-based competition, as well as rental-kart and indoor-karting leagues. Drivers from national and regional series may qualify for international finals such as the Rotax MAX Challenge Grand Finals or ROK Cup Superfinal through local or regional programmes.

=== Asia, Middle East and Africa ===
Karting in Asia, the Middle East and Africa includes national championships, regional Rotax and ROK events, manufacturer-supported one-make series, rental-kart competitions and international arrive-and-drive series. Rotax has run regional events in Asia, including the Rotax MAX Challenge International Trophy Asia, which awards tickets to the Rotax MAX Challenge Grand Finals.

The Champions of the Future Academy Program has expanded into the Middle East, with its international calendar including events in Oman and the United Arab Emirates, and a UAE series introduced as a two-round championship using an arrive-and-drive format.

In South Africa, karting is organised through national, regional and club-level racing under Motorsport South Africa and associated karting organisers. Karting South Africa describes the South African Kart Championships as a national championship structure with age-based Rotax categories including Bambino, Micro MAX, Mini MAX, Junior MAX, Senior MAX, DD2 and DD2 Masters. ROK Cup South Africa also operates national karting events using controlled engine-pool arrangements.

=== Australia and Oceania ===
In Australia, the Australian Kart Championship is the country's national-level karting championship. Karting Australia describes it as the premier karting championship in the Southern Hemisphere, contested across multiple rounds and attracting drivers from Australia, New Zealand and Asia. Karting Australia also organises national-level events and recognises categories including KZ2, KA2, X30, TaG 125, KA3 Senior, KA3 Junior and Cadet classes.

New Zealand and other Oceania karting scenes are commonly linked to regional competition through national championships, Rotax and manufacturer-supported categories, and participation in international finals. Drivers from Oceania may also compete in Australian and Asian regional events, including Rotax and ROK-based series.

== Regional, club and non-sanctioned racing ==
Below national and international level, karting is widely organised through regional series, club championships, local circuits, rental-kart leagues and commercial arrive-and-drive events. These events vary in formality, with some run under national motorsport authority permits and others organised privately by tracks, clubs or commercial operators.

Regional and club racing commonly uses similar formats to national karting, including practice, qualifying, heats, finals and endurance events. Non-sanctioned or commercial karting often uses rental karts and may focus on recreation, corporate events, local leagues or driver development rather than progression through formal championship structures. Although such events may not form part of recognised national championship pathways, they are often the entry point through which new drivers first experience kart racing.

== Racing formats ==
Kart racing is commonly divided into sprint, endurance, street, speedway and long-circuit formats. The format used depends on the type of circuit, class of kart, organising body and whether the event is run as a club race, regional series, national championship or international event.

=== Sprint ===
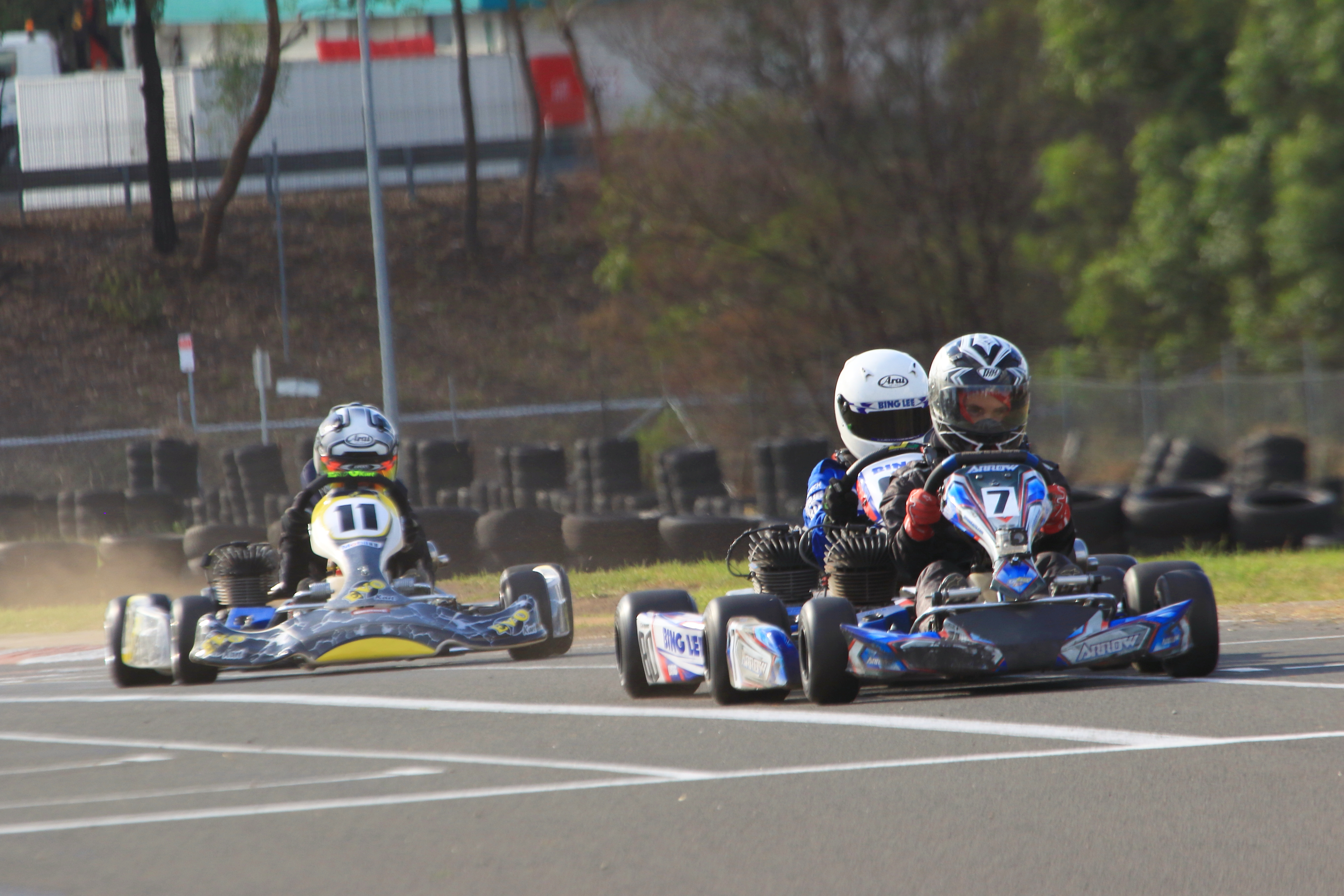
Sprint race at Eastern Creek, Australia

Sprint racing is the most common form of competitive karting. It takes place on dedicated kart circuits resembling small road courses, with left and right turns, hairpins, chicanes and short straights. Motorsport UK describes most karting as short-circuit racing, with events commonly made up of practice, qualifying, heats and one or two finals.

Sprint events normally consist of a series of short races, with results from qualifying or heat races used to set starting positions for later heats or finals. The format places emphasis on qualifying performance, overtaking, racecraft and consistency across a race meeting.

Major sprint karting events include national championship rounds, manufacturer-supported one-make series and international FIA Karting events. The Karting World Championship and FIA Karting European Championship are examples of international sprint-format karting competitions.

=== Endurance ===
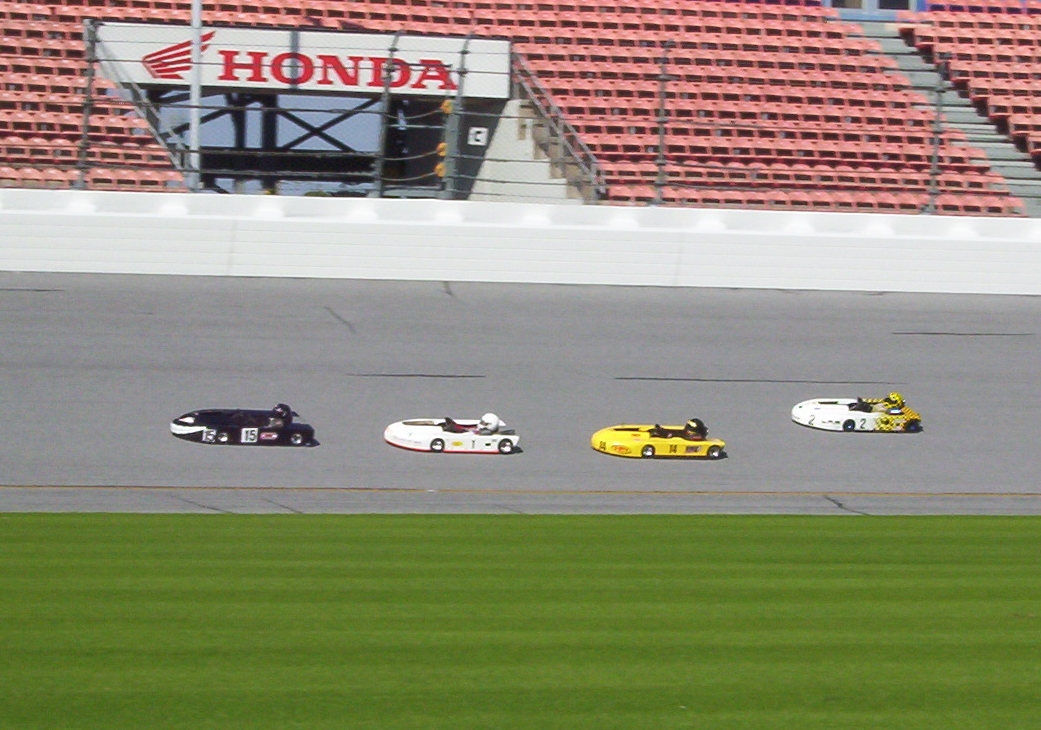
Pack of laydown enduros at Daytona International Speedway

Endurance karting consists of races run over longer distances or time periods than sprint racing. Events may last from around 30 minutes to 24 hours or more and can be contested by individual drivers or teams. Endurance formats often include pit stops, driver changes, fuel strategy and mechanical reliability as elements of competition.

In the United States, some endurance karting events, often called enduro or road-racing events, are held on full-size road-racing circuits using specialised laydown or sprint-enduro karts. The World Karting Association describes its Road Racing Series, formerly known as the Enduro Series, as using longer road courses typically built for cars, with sprint-enduro races of 30 minutes and laydown-enduro races of 45 minutes.

Endurance karting is also used in rental-kart and arrive-and-drive competitions, where team formats allow new or amateur drivers to participate without owning a kart. A notable endurance karting venue is the Karting des 24 Heures complex at Le Mans, which includes the Circuit Alain Prost, Circuit Indy-Kart and Circuit International de Karting.

=== Street ===
Street karting is held on temporary circuits laid out on closed public roads, urban areas, parks or temporary event spaces. These events are less common than sprint races on permanent kart circuits and are usually organised as individual events or special meetings rather than regular club championship rounds.

Street circuits may use barriers, kerbs and temporary safety infrastructure, and their layouts can vary significantly from year to year. Examples of street karting events have included the Quincy Grand Prix in Illinois and the Rock Island Grand Prix.

=== Speedway and dirt oval ===
Speedway karting is held on oval or near-oval tracks, usually on asphalt, clay or dirt surfaces. The World Karting Association publishes rules for speedway pavement and speedway dirt karting, while the American Kart Racing Association publishes technical material for 4-cycle dirt karting.

Speedway tracks are typically shorter than sprint circuits and consist primarily of straights and left-hand turns. Speedway karting is especially associated with regional and club-level racing in parts of the United States and other countries with oval-racing traditions.

Specialised offset kart chassis may be used for oval racing, with chassis geometry and setup designed for left-turn-only competition. Race formats commonly include practice, qualifying, heat races and feature races, with starting positions determined either by timed qualifying or heat results.

=== Long-circuit and superkart racing ===
Long-circuit karting uses larger circuits than conventional sprint karting and may take place on full-size motor racing circuits. Superkart racing is the best-known high-performance long-circuit category, using more powerful karts than standard sprint classes and racing on circuits also used by cars and motorcycles. Motorsport UK describes more powerful superkarts, or long-circuit karts, as racing on full-size race tracks.

At international level, FIA karting categories have included direct-drive karts, gearbox karts and Superkarts. The FIA describes Superkart as a category that can fully express itself only on automobile tracks.

== Classes and categories ==
Karting classes are usually defined by a combination of driver age, engine type, chassis specification, minimum weight and whether the kart uses a single-speed or gearbox transmission. Motorsport UK describes karting categories as including Cadet, Inter, Junior, Senior and Gearbox classes. At international level, FIA Karting categories include direct-drive, gearbox and Superkart classes.

== Racing licences ==
As with other forms of regulated motorsport, competitive kart racing usually requires a competition licence issued by, or under the authority of, a recognised motorsport governing body. Licence requirements vary by country, championship and level of competition. In the United Kingdom, Motorsport UK states that drivers need the correct licence for the event they wish to enter, with class and age-group information set out in the Motorsport UK Kart Race Yearbook and relevant event regulations.

Licence systems commonly distinguish between practice, novice, club, national and international levels. Some licences require a medical declaration, safety training, an observed driving assessment or completion of novice races before a driver may progress to higher levels of competition. For international FIA Karting events, drivers must hold the relevant international licence issued through their national sporting authority.

== Driver equipment ==
Kart drivers are required to wear appropriate personal protective equipment. Motorsport UK states that karting competitors require compliant safety items including a helmet, race suit, gloves and boots, and that helmets and overalls must meet recognised motorsport standards.

Typical karting safety equipment includes:

- full-face helmet to an approved motorsport standard;
- karting race suit or overalls;
- gloves;
- boots covering the ankles;
- rib protector or kart body protector;
- neck protection, where required or recommended by the organiser.

Equipment requirements vary by country, governing body, class and event type. Motorsport UK states that a rib protector is not mandatory in its introductory guidance but is recommended, while leather suits are mandatory for long-circuit karting. At higher levels of competition, the applicable technical regulations or supplementary regulations specify the exact homologation standards and expiry dates for helmets, suits and other protective equipment.

== Cost and accessibility ==
The cost of competitive karting varies widely depending on the level of competition, country, class, equipment and whether the driver owns a kart or competes in arrive-and-drive events. Costs can include a chassis, engine, tyres, fuel, spares, safety equipment, licence fees, entry fees, testing, travel, mechanical support and coaching.

High-level international karting has attracted criticism for rising costs. In response, the FIA has introduced initiatives intended to make karting more accessible, including the OK-N and OK-N Junior categories and the FIA Karting Arrive and Drive World Cup. The FIA's Global Karting Plan describes arrive-and-drive competition as a way to reduce cost and technical inequality by using standardised equipment supplied by the organiser.

Arrive-and-drive karting allows competitors to race in karts supplied by the organiser or circuit, reducing the need to buy and maintain their own equipment. This format is common in rental karting, corporate events, indoor karting and some national or international competitions. Motorsport UK describes karting as accessible through local clubs and circuits, while the FIA Arrive and Drive World Cup uses identical karts to reduce technical and financial disparities between competitors.

== Driver development ==
Karting is widely used as an early development discipline for racing drivers because it teaches racecraft, car control, overtaking, braking technique, mechanical understanding and close-quarters competition at relatively low speeds compared with car racing. Motorsport UK describes karting as a common starting point for drivers and notes that many professional racing drivers began their careers in karts.

Many successful racing drivers began in karting before progressing to cars. Formula One drivers who raced in karting include Ayrton Senna, Michael Schumacher, Lewis Hamilton, Sebastian Vettel, Max Verstappen and Lando Norris. Drivers in other disciplines, including NASCAR, IndyCar, sports cars and touring cars, have also used karting as an early development pathway.

Karting is also used by established racing drivers for training and practice. The relevance of karting to driver development comes from the directness of the machinery, the frequency of wheel-to-wheel racing, and the emphasis on precision, consistency and adaptability. At the same time, karting is not only a stepping stone to car racing; it is also a competitive motorsport discipline in its own right, with national, regional and international championships.

== See also ==
- Go-kart
- Kart circuit
- Karting World Championship
- List of kart racing championships
- Kart manufacturers
- Kart racing game
- Cyclekart
- Crosskart
- Micro kart
- Superkart
