= 2025 Nürburgring Langstrecken-Serie =

48th season of the German endurance series

The 2025 Nürburgring Langstrecken-Serie was the 48th season of the German endurance series (formerly VLN) run at the Nürburgring Nordschleife, and sixth run as the Nürburgring Langstrecken Serie (NLS). The season began on 22 March and finished on 11 October.

== Calendar ==
In 2025, the Nürburgring Langstrecken-Serie introduced "NLS Light," a special 4-hour race that, for the first time, excluded vehicles from the SP9, SPX, SP-Pro, and CUP 2 classes. Additionally, the two Nürburgring 24 Hours Qualifying Races were once again included as part of the NLS season.

Rnd.		Race	Length	Circuit	Date
1	NLS1	70. ADAC Westfalenfahrt	4 hours	(Germany) Nürburgring Nordschleife	22 March
2	NLS2	ADAC Ruhrpott-Trophy	4 hours	(Germany) Nürburgring Nordschleife	26 April
3	NLS3	56. Adenauer ADAC Rundstrecken-Trophy	4 hours	(Germany) Nürburgring Nordschleife	10 May
4	24H-Q1	ADAC 24h Nürburgring Qualifiers Rennen 1	4 hours	(Germany) Nürburgring Nordschleife	24 May
5	24H-Q2	ADAC 24h Nürburgring Qualifiers Rennen 2	4 hours	(Germany) Nürburgring Nordschleife	25 May
L	NLSL	NLS-Light (Note: The NLS Light race is a standalone event and does not award points for the Nürburgring Langstrecken-Serie championship.)	4 hours	(Germany) Nürburgring Nordschleife	5 July
6	NLS6	KW 6h ADAC Ruhr-Pokal-Rennen	6 hours	(Germany) Nürburgring Nordschleife	16 August
7	NLS7	65. ADAC ACAS Cup	4 hours	(Germany) Nürburgring Nordschleife	13 September
8	NLS8	64. ADAC Reinoldus-Langstreckenrennen	4 hours	(Germany) Nürburgring Nordschleife	14 September
9	NLS9	57. ADAC Barbarossapreis	4 hours	(Germany) Nürburgring Nordschleife	27 September
10	NLS10	1. NLS Sportwarte-Rennen - Final Race of Champions	4 hours	(Germany) Nürburgring Nordschleife	11 October

== Classes ==
Entries are split into multiple different classes. Current classes are:

	Class
NLS specials
SP3	Purpose-built racecars with an engine capacity between 1750 and 2000 cc.
SP4	Purpose-built racecars with an engine capacity between 2001 and 2500 cc.
SP5	Purpose-built racecars with an engine capacity between 2501 and 3000 cc.
SP6	Purpose-built racecars with an engine capacity between 3001 and 3500 cc.
SP7	Purpose-built racecars with an engine capacity between 3501 and 4000 cc.
SP8	Purpose-built racecars with an engine capacity over 4000 cc.
SP9	For FIA-homologated Group GT3 cars. GT3 sub-classes based on driver ranking system maintained by the FIA.
SP9 Pro, SP9 Pro-Am & SP9 Am	For FIA-homologated Group GT3 cars. GT3 sub-classes based on driver ranking system maintained by the FIA.
SP10	For FIA and SRO-homologated Group GT4 cars. GT4 sub-classes based on driver ranking system.
SP10 Pro, SP10 Am	For FIA and SRO-homologated Group GT4 cars. GT4 sub-classes based on driver ranking system.
SP11	For FIA and SRO-homologated Group GT2 cars. GT2 sub-classes based on driver ranking system.
SP11 Pro, SP11 Pro-Am & SP11 Am	For FIA and SRO-homologated Group GT2 cars. GT2 sub-classes based on driver ranking system.
SP2T	Purpose-built racecars with a turbocharged-engine capacity between 1350 and 1750 cc.
SP3T	Purpose-built racecars with a turbocharged-engine capacity between 1751 and 2000 cc.
SP4T	Purpose-built racecars with a turbocharged-engine capacity between 2001 and 2600 cc.
SP8T	Purpose-built racecars with a turbocharged-engine capacity between 2601 and 4000 cc.
SP-Pro	Prototype racecars with an engine capacity over 3000 cc.
SP-X	'Special vehicles' which do not fit into any other class.
AT(-G)	Vehicles using alternative fuel sources (e.g. electric, LPG, hydrogen, etc.) Cars will be split determined by a pre event BoP.
AT 1 AT 2 AT 3	Vehicles using alternative fuel sources (e.g. electric, LPG, hydrogen, etc.) Cars will be split determined by a pre event BoP.
TCR touring cars
TCR	FIA-homologated TCR Touring Cars.
NLS production cars
V3	Production cars with an engine capacity up to 2000 cc.
V4	Production cars with an engine capacity between 2001 and 2500 cc.
V5	Production cars with an engine capacity between 2501 and 3000 cc.
V6	Production cars with an engine capacity between 3001 and 3500 cc.
VT1	Production cars with a turbocharged-engine capacity up to 1600 cc.
VT2	Production cars with a turbocharged-engine capacity between 1601 and 2000 cc.
VT3	Production cars with a turbocharged-engine capacity between 2001 and 3000 cc.
VT Hybrid	Production cars with hybrid power units.
V Elektro	Production cars with electric powertrains.
Porsche Endurance Trophy Nürburgring Class cars Cup classes are for single make identical or near identical specification cars
Cup 2	Porsche 992 GT3 Cup cars using Michelin control tyres.
Cup 3	Porsche Cayman GT4 Trophy cars.
Cup Class cars Cup classes are for single make identical or near identical specification cars
M2 CS	BMW M2 CS cars.
M240i	BMW M240i Racing Cup cars.
325i	BMW 325i Type E46, E90, E91, E92
Gruppe H historic cars
H2	Pre-2014 production cars and purpose-built racecars with an engine capacity up to 1999 cc.
H4	Pre-2014 production cars and purpose-built racecars with an engine capacity between 2000 and 6250 cc.

== Entry list ==
=== Main classes ===
==== SP9 (Group GT3) ====
Team	Car	No.	Drivers	Class	Rounds
(Germany) HRT Ford Performance	Ford Mustang GT3	2	(Germany) Frank Stippler	P	1–3
(Germany) HRT Ford Performance	Ford Mustang GT3	2	(Norway) Dennis Olsen	P	1–2
(Germany) HRT Ford Performance	Ford Mustang GT3	2	(Germany) Nico Bastian	P	1
(Germany) HRT Ford Performance	Ford Mustang GT3	2	(India) Arjun Maini	P	1, 3
(Germany) HRT Ford Performance	Ford Mustang GT3	2	(Germany) Hubert Haupt	P	2–3
(Germany) HRT Ford Performance	Ford Mustang GT3	2	(Germany) Jusuf Owega	P	2–3
(Germany) HRT Ford Performance	Ford Mustang GT3	6	(Germany) Dennis Fetzer	P	1, 3
(Germany) HRT Ford Performance	Ford Mustang GT3	6	(Germany) Dirk Müller	P	1, 3
(Germany) HRT Ford Performance	Ford Mustang GT3	6	(Germany) Jusuf Owega	P	1
(Germany) HRT Ford Performance	Ford Mustang GT3	6	(Germany) David Schumacher	P	1
(Germany) HRT Ford Performance	Ford Mustang GT3	6	(Germany) Vincent Kolb	P	3, 6–10
(Germany) HRT Ford Performance	Ford Mustang GT3	6	(Germany) Patrick Assenheimer	P	3, 6
(Germany) HRT Ford Performance	Ford Mustang GT3	6	(Germany) Frank Stippler	P	6–10
(Germany) HRT Ford Performance	Ford Mustang GT3	6	(Germany) Patrick Assenheimer	PA	2
(Germany) HRT Ford Performance	Ford Mustang GT3	6	(Germany) Dennis Fetzer	PA	2
(Germany) HRT Ford Performance	Ford Mustang GT3	6	(Germany) Salman Owega	PA	2
(Germany) HRT Ford Performance	Ford Mustang GT3	6	(Germany) David Schumacher	PA	2
(Germany) HRT Ford Performance	Ford Mustang GT3	9	(Germany) Dennis Fetzer	P	9
(Germany) HRT Ford Performance	Ford Mustang GT3	9	(Switzerland) Fabio Scherer	P	9
(Germany) HRT Ford Performance	Ford Mustang GT3	9	(United Kingdom) Jann Mardenborough	P	9
(Germany) HRT Ford Performance	Ford Mustang GT3	9	(Germany) Patrick Assenheimer	PA	10
(Germany) HRT Ford Performance	Ford Mustang GT3	9	(Germany) Dennis Fetzer	PA	10
(Germany) HRT Ford Performance	Ford Mustang GT3	9	(Switzerland) Fabio Scherer	PA	10
(Germany) Falken Motorsports	Porsche 911 GT3 R (992)	3; 33 (Note: Alternate number used during the 24h Nürburgring Qualifiers races.)	(Germany) Sven Müller	P	1, 3, 6
(Germany) Falken Motorsports	Porsche 911 GT3 R (992)	3; 33	(Netherlands) Morris Schuring	P	1, 3
(Germany) Falken Motorsports	Porsche 911 GT3 R (992)	3; 33	(Belgium) Alessio Picariello	P	2, 4–5
(Germany) Falken Motorsports	Porsche 911 GT3 R (992)	3; 33	(France) Dorian Boccolacci	P	2
(Germany) Falken Motorsports	Porsche 911 GT3 R (992)	3; 33	(France) Julien Andlauer	P	4–5, 7–8
(Germany) Falken Motorsports	Porsche 911 GT3 R (992)	3; 33	(Austria) Klaus Bachler	P	6
(Germany) Falken Motorsports	Porsche 911 GT3 R (992)	3; 33	(Germany) Joel Sturm	P	7–8, 10
(Germany) Falken Motorsports	Porsche 911 GT3 R (992)	3; 33	(Germany) Nico Menzel	P	10
(Germany) Falken Motorsports	Porsche 911 GT3 R (992)	4; 44	(Germany) Nico Menzel	P	1, 4–6, 10
(Germany) Falken Motorsports	Porsche 911 GT3 R (992)	4; 44	(France) Dorian Boccolacci	P	1, 4–5, 10
(Germany) Falken Motorsports	Porsche 911 GT3 R (992)	4; 44	(Germany) Dennis Marschall	P	2–3, 5–6
(Germany) Falken Motorsports	Porsche 911 GT3 R (992)	4; 44	(Germany) Tim Heinemann	P	2–3, 7–8
(Germany) Falken Motorsports	Porsche 911 GT3 R (992)	4; 44	(Germany) Benjamin Leuchter	P	7–8
(Austria) Konrad Motorsport	Lamborghini Huracán GT3 Evo	7	(Germany) Maximilian Paul	P	1
(Austria) Konrad Motorsport	Lamborghini Huracán GT3 Evo	7	(United States) Danny Soufi	P	1
(Austria) Konrad Motorsport	Lamborghini Huracán GT3 Evo	7	(Germany) Peter Elkmann	PA	2
(Austria) Konrad Motorsport	Lamborghini Huracán GT3 Evo	7	(United States) Danny Soufi	PA	2
(Lithuania) Juta Racing	Audi R8 LMS Evo II	8	(Germany) Alexey Veremenko (Note: Veremenko, and "Selv" are Russians, but are competing under German license, Kvitka is Russian, but competes under a Kyrgyzstani license as Russian national emblems were banned by the FIA due to the Russian invasion of Ukraine.)	PA	1–2, 4–10
(Lithuania) Juta Racing	Audi R8 LMS Evo II	8	(Germany) "Selv"	PA	1–2, 4–10
(Lithuania) Juta Racing	Audi R8 LMS Evo II	8	(Germany) Frank Stippler	PA	1–2, 4–10
(Lithuania) Juta Racing	Audi R8 LMS Evo II	8	(Germany) Elia Erhart	PA	4–5
(Germany) SR Motorsport by Schnitzelalm	Mercedes-AMG GT3 Evo	11	(Germany) Jay Mo Härtling	PA	3
(Germany) SR Motorsport by Schnitzelalm	Mercedes-AMG GT3 Evo	11	(Germany) Kenneth Heyer	PA	3
(Germany) SR Motorsport by Schnitzelalm	Mercedes-AMG GT3 Evo	11	(Germany) Jannes Fittje	PA	3
(Germany) Mercedes-AMG Team Bilstein by GetSpeed	Mercedes-AMG GT3 Evo	14	(Germany) Luca Stolz	P	1, 3–5
(Germany) Mercedes-AMG Team Bilstein by GetSpeed	Mercedes-AMG GT3 Evo	14	(Germany) Maro Engel	P	1, 3
(Germany) Mercedes-AMG Team Bilstein by GetSpeed	Mercedes-AMG GT3 Evo	14	(Belgium) Maxime Martin	P	1, 4–5
(Germany) Mercedes-AMG Team Bilstein by GetSpeed	Mercedes-AMG GT3 Evo	14	(Germany) Fabian Schiller	P	3–5
(Germany) Mercedes-AMG Team GetSpeed	Mercedes-AMG GT3 Evo	17	(Estonia) Ralf Aron	P	1, 4–5
(Germany) Mercedes-AMG Team GetSpeed	Mercedes-AMG GT3 Evo	17	(United Kingdom) Adam Christodoulou	P	1, 4–5
(Germany) Mercedes-AMG Team GetSpeed	Mercedes-AMG GT3 Evo	17	(Canada) Mikaël Grenier	P	1, 4–5
(Germany) Mercedes-AMG Team GetSpeed	Mercedes-AMG GT3 Evo	17	(Austria) Lucas Auer	P	1
(Germany) Scherer Sport PHX	Audi R8 LMS Evo II	15; 1	(Germany) Luca Ludwig	P	1, 3–5
(Germany) Scherer Sport PHX	Audi R8 LMS Evo II	15; 1	(Germany) Markus Winkelhock	P	1
(Germany) Scherer Sport PHX	Audi R8 LMS Evo II	15; 1	(Germany) Christopher Haase	P	3–5
(Germany) Scherer Sport PHX	Porsche 911 GT3 R (992)	16	(Switzerland) Patric Niederhauser	P	2–5
(Germany) Scherer Sport PHX	Porsche 911 GT3 R (992)	16	(France) Patrick Pilet	P	2
(Germany) Scherer Sport PHX	Porsche 911 GT3 R (992)	16	(Switzerland) Ricardo Feller	P	3
(Germany) Scherer Sport PHX	Porsche 911 GT3 R (992)	16	(Belgium) Laurens Vanthoor	P	4–5
(Germany) Frikadelli Racing Team	Ferrari 296 GT3	21	(Germany) Klaus Abbelen	Am	7–9
(Germany) Huber Motorsport	Porsche 911 GT3 R (992)	25	(Germany) Thomas Kiefer	Am	9
(Germany) Huber Motorsport	Porsche 911 GT3 R (992)	25	(Germany) Joachim Thyssen	Am	9
(Germany) Huber Motorsport	Porsche 911 GT3 R (992)	25	(Germany) Hans Wehrmann	Am	9
(Germany) Red Bull Team ABT	Lamborghini Huracán GT3 Evo 2	27	(Italy) Mirko Bortolotti	P	1, 3
(Germany) Red Bull Team ABT	Lamborghini Huracán GT3 Evo 2	27	(Germany) Luca Engstler	P	1, 3
(Germany) Red Bull Team ABT	Lamborghini Huracán GT3 Evo 2	27	(South Africa) Jordan Pepper	P	1
(Germany) Red Bull Team ABT	Lamborghini Huracán GT3 Evo 2	27	(Germany) Christian Engelhart	P	3–5
(Germany) Red Bull Team ABT	Lamborghini Huracán GT3 Evo 2	27	(Spain) Daniel Juncadella	P	4–5
(Germany) Red Bull Team ABT	Lamborghini Huracán GT3 Evo 2	27	(Italy) Marco Mapelli	P	4–5
(South Korea) Hankook Competition	Porsche 911 GT3 R (992)	30; 55	(South Korea) Kim Jongkyum	PA	2–5, 10
(South Korea) Hankook Competition	Porsche 911 GT3 R (992)	30; 55	(Netherlands) Roelof Bruins	PA	2–5, 10
(South Korea) Hankook Competition	Porsche 911 GT3 R (992)	30; 55	(Germany) Marco Holzer	PA	2–5
(South Korea) Hankook Competition	Porsche 911 GT3 R (992)	30; 55	(Canada) Steven Cho	PA	3–5, 10
(South Korea) Hankook Competition	Porsche 911 GT3 R (992)	30; 55	(Germany) Marco Seefried	PA	10
(Switzerland) Emil Frey Racing	Ferrari 296 GT3	31	(United Kingdom) Chris Lulham	P	9
(Switzerland) Emil Frey Racing	Ferrari 296 GT3	31	(Netherlands) Max Verstappen	P	9
(Germany) Walkenhorst Motorsport	Aston Martin Vantage AMR GT3 Evo	34	(Norway) Christian Krognes	P	2, 4–5
(Germany) Walkenhorst Motorsport	Aston Martin Vantage AMR GT3 Evo	34	(Italy) Mattia Drudi	P	2, 4–5
(Germany) Walkenhorst Motorsport	Aston Martin Vantage AMR GT3 Evo	34	(United Kingdom) David Pittard	P	3–5
(Germany) Walkenhorst Motorsport	Aston Martin Vantage AMR GT3 Evo	34	(Denmark) Nicki Thiim	P	3
(Germany) Walkenhorst Motorsport	Aston Martin Vantage AMR GT3 Evo	34	(Norway) Christian Krognes	PA	7–9
(Germany) Walkenhorst Motorsport	Aston Martin Vantage AMR GT3 Evo	34	(Ecuador) Mateo Villagomez	PA	7–9
(Germany) Walkenhorst Motorsport	Aston Martin Vantage AMR GT3 Evo	34	(Norway) Anders Buchardt	PA	7–9
(Germany) Walkenhorst Motorsport	Aston Martin Vantage AMR GT3 Evo	35	(Norway) Anders Buchardt	PA	2, 4–5
(Germany) Walkenhorst Motorsport	Aston Martin Vantage AMR GT3 Evo	35	(Germany) Nico Hantke	PA	2
(Germany) Walkenhorst Motorsport	Aston Martin Vantage AMR GT3 Evo	35	(Sweden) Oliver Söderström	PA	4–5
(Germany) Walkenhorst Motorsport	Aston Martin Vantage AMR GT3 Evo	36; 30	(Norway) Christian Krognes	PA	1, 3
(Germany) Walkenhorst Motorsport	Aston Martin Vantage AMR GT3 Evo	36; 30	(Germany) Henry Walkenhorst	PA	1
(Germany) Walkenhorst Motorsport	Aston Martin Vantage AMR GT3 Evo	36; 30	(Germany) Stefan Aust	PA	3
(Germany) Walkenhorst Motorsport	Aston Martin Vantage AMR GT3 Evo	36; 30	(Norway) Anders Buchardt	PA	3
(Germany) Walkenhorst Motorsport	Aston Martin Vantage AMR GT3 Evo	36; 30	(Germany) Christian Bollrath	Am	2, 4–5
(Germany) Walkenhorst Motorsport	Aston Martin Vantage AMR GT3 Evo	36; 30	(Germany) Stefan Aust	Am	2
(Germany) Walkenhorst Motorsport	Aston Martin Vantage AMR GT3 Evo	36; 30	(Germany) Jörg Breuer	Am	2
(Germany) Walkenhorst Motorsport	Aston Martin Vantage AMR GT3 Evo	36; 30	(Germany) Henry Walkenhorst	Am	4–5
(Germany) PROsport-Racing	Aston Martin Vantage AMR GT3	37	(France) Steven Palette	PA	4–5
(Germany) PROsport-Racing	Aston Martin Vantage AMR GT3	37	(Germany) Marek Böckmann	PA	4–5
(Germany) PROsport-Racing	Aston Martin Vantage AMR GT3	37	(Germany) Nico Bastian	PA	4–5
(Germany) Car Collection Motorsport	Porsche 911 GT3 R (992)	44	(Switzerland) Alex Fontana	PA	7–8
(Germany) Car Collection Motorsport	Porsche 911 GT3 R (992)	44	(Armenia) Artur Goroyan	PA	7–8
(Japan) Realize Kondo Racing with Rinaldi	Ferrari 296 GT3	45	(France) Thomas Neubauer	P	1–2, 4–5
(Japan) Realize Kondo Racing with Rinaldi	Ferrari 296 GT3	45	(Germany) Felipe Fernández Laser	P	1–2, 4–5
(Japan) Realize Kondo Racing with Rinaldi	Ferrari 296 GT3	45	(Zimbabwe) Axcil Jefferies	P	1, 4–5
(Japan) Realize Kondo Racing with Rinaldi	Ferrari 296 GT3	45	(South Africa) David Perel	P	2, 4–5
(Japan) Realize Kondo Racing with Rinaldi	Ferrari 296 GT3	45	(France) Thomas Neubauer	PA	3
(Japan) Realize Kondo Racing with Rinaldi	Ferrari 296 GT3	45	(Zimbabwe) Axcil Jefferies	PA	3
(Japan) Realize Kondo Racing with Rinaldi	Ferrari 296 GT3	45	(South Africa) David Perel	PA	3
(Germany) Black Falcon Team EAE	Porsche 911 GT3 R (992)	48	(Netherlands) "Daan Arrow"	PA	1–2, 4–6
(Germany) Black Falcon Team EAE	Porsche 911 GT3 R (992)	48	(Germany) Ben Bünnagel	PA	1–2, 4–5
(Germany) Black Falcon Team EAE	Porsche 911 GT3 R (992)	48	(Germany) Mike Stursberg	PA	1–2, 6
(Germany) Black Falcon Team EAE	Porsche 911 GT3 R (992)	48	(Italy) Gabriele Piana	PA	1, 4–6
(Germany) Black Falcon Team EAE	Porsche 911 GT3 R (992)	48	(Turkey) Mustafa Mehmet Kaya	PA	2, 4–6
(Germany) Black Falcon Team EAE	Porsche 911 GT3 R (992)	48	(Turkey) Mustafa Mehmet Kaya	Am	7–8
(Germany) Black Falcon Team EAE	Porsche 911 GT3 R (992)	48	(Germany) Mike Stursberg	Am	7–8
(Germany) Black Falcon Team EAE	Porsche 911 GT3 R (992)	48	(Germany) Tobias Müller	Am	7
(Germany) Black Falcon Team EAE	Porsche 911 GT3 R (992)	48	(Germany) Ben Bünnagel	Am	8
(Germany) équipe vitesse	Audi R8 LMS Evo II	50	(Germany) Michael Heimrich	Am	1–10
(Germany) équipe vitesse	Audi R8 LMS Evo II	50	(Germany) Arno Klasen	Am	1–10
(Germany) équipe vitesse	Audi R8 LMS Evo II	50	(Italy) Lorenzo Rocco di Torrepadula	Am	2, 4–5, 10
(Germany) équipe vitesse	Audi R8 LMS Evo II	50	(Sweden) Eric Ullström	Am	3–6
(Germany) équipe vitesse	Audi R8 LMS Evo II	50	(Germany) Sascha Steinhardt	Am	9
(Italy) Dinamic GT	Porsche 911 GT3 R (992)	54	(Denmark) Bastian Buus	P	1–5, 9
(Italy) Dinamic GT	Porsche 911 GT3 R (992)	54	(Germany) Joel Sturm	P	2–5, 9
(Italy) Dinamic GT	Porsche 911 GT3 R (992)	54	(Netherlands) Loek Hartog	P	3–5
(Italy) Dinamic GT	Porsche 911 GT3 R (992)	54	(Italy) Matteo Cairoli	P	1
(Germany) Dörr Motorsport	McLaren 720S GT3 Evo	69	(Germany) Ben Dörr	PA	1, 3
(Germany) Dörr Motorsport	McLaren 720S GT3 Evo	69	(Germany) Phil Dörr	PA	1, 3
(Austria) Eastalent Racing Team	Audi R8 LMS Evo II	84	(Austria) Simon Reicher	P	4–5
(Austria) Eastalent Racing Team	Audi R8 LMS Evo II	84	(Austria) Christian Klien	P	4–5
(Austria) Eastalent Racing Team	Audi R8 LMS Evo II	84	(Austria) Norbert Siedler	P	4–5
(Austria) Eastalent Racing Team	Audi R8 LMS Evo II	84	(Austria) Max Hofer	P	4–5
(Germany) Rowe Racing	BMW M4 GT3 Evo	98	(Brazil) Augusto Farfus	P	1–2
(Germany) Rowe Racing	BMW M4 GT3 Evo	98	(Finland) Jesse Krohn	P	1–2
(Germany) Rowe Racing	BMW M4 GT3 Evo	98	(Switzerland) Raffaele Marciello	P	1–2
(Germany) Rowe Racing	BMW M4 GT3 Evo	98	(South Africa) Kelvin van der Linde	P	1–2
(Thailand) Renazzo Motor with mcchip-dkr	Lamborghini Huracán GT3 Evo 2	786	(Germany) Christoph Breuer	Am	1–3, 6–10
(Thailand) Renazzo Motor with mcchip-dkr	Lamborghini Huracán GT3 Evo 2	786	(Thailand) Kiki Sak Nana	Am	1–3, 6–10
(Thailand) Renazzo Motor with mcchip-dkr	Lamborghini Huracán GT3 Evo 2	786	(Germany) Dieter Schmidtmann	Am	1–3, 6–10
(Thailand) Renazzo Motor with mcchip-dkr	Lamborghini Huracán GT3 Evo 2	786	(Germany) Thomas Mutsch	Am	3
(Germany) Manthey Racing EMA	Porsche 911 GT3 R (992)	911	(Turkey) Ayhancan Güven	P	1, 3
(Germany) Manthey Racing EMA	Porsche 911 GT3 R (992)	911	(Austria) Thomas Preining	P	1, 3
(Germany) Manthey Racing EMA	Porsche 911 GT3 R (992)	911	(France) Kévin Estre	P	4–5
(Germany) Manthey Racing EMA	Porsche 911 GT3 R (992)	911	(France) Patrick Pilet	P	4–5
Entry Lists:

Icon	Class
P	Pro Cup
PA	Pro-Am Cup
Am	Am Cup

==== SP10 (Group GT4) ====
Team	Car	No.	Drivers	Class	Rounds
(Germany) AV Racing by Black Falcon	BMW M4 GT4 Gen II	162; 67	(Romania) Alexandru Vasilescu	Am	3–5
(Germany) AV Racing by Black Falcon	BMW M4 GT4 Gen II	162; 67	(Germany) Axel König	Am	3
(Germany) AV Racing by Black Falcon	BMW M4 GT4 Gen II	162; 67	(Germany) Norbert Schneider	Am	3
(Germany) AV Racing by Black Falcon	BMW M4 GT4 Gen II	162; 67	(United States) Benjamin Koslowski	Am	4–5
(Germany) AV Racing by Black Falcon	BMW M4 GT4 Gen II	162; 67	(United States) Christoph Koslowski	Am	4–5
(Germany) AV Racing by Black Falcon	BMW M4 GT4 Gen II	162; 67	(Germany) Leon Wassertheurer	Am	4–5
(Germany) AV Racing by Black Falcon	BMW M4 GT4 Gen II	163	(Romania) Alexandru Vasilescu	Am	6–7
(Germany) AV Racing by Black Falcon	BMW M4 GT4 Gen II	163	(United States) Ryan Harrison	Am	6, 8
(Germany) AV Racing by Black Falcon	BMW M4 GT4 Gen II	163	(United States) Charles Espenlaub	Am	6
(Germany) AV Racing by Black Falcon	BMW M4 GT4 Gen II	163	(United States) Judson Holt	Am	7–8
(Germany) AV Racing by Black Falcon	BMW M4 GT4 Gen II	163	(United States) Denny Stripling	Am	7–8
(Germany) W&S Motorsport	Porsche 718 Cayman GT4 RS Clubsport	164	(Germany) Stephan Brodmerkel	Am	1–3, 6–9
(Germany) W&S Motorsport	Porsche 718 Cayman GT4 RS Clubsport	164	(Germany) Jürgen Vöhringer	Am	1–3, 7–8
(Germany) W&S Motorsport	Porsche 718 Cayman GT4 RS Clubsport	164	(Germany) Hendrik Still	Am	1, 3, 6, 9
(Germany) W&S Motorsport	Porsche 718 Cayman GT4 RS Clubsport	164	(Germany) Niclas Wiedemann	Am	2, 7–8
(Germany) W&S Motorsport	Porsche 718 Cayman GT4 RS Clubsport	164	(Austria) Constantin Schöll	Am	9
(Germany) AVIA W&S Motorsport	Porsche 718 Cayman GT4 RS Clubsport	165	(United Kingdom) Toby Goodman	P	1–3, 6–9
(Germany) AVIA W&S Motorsport	Porsche 718 Cayman GT4 RS Clubsport	165	(Finland) Philip Miemois	P	1–3, 6–9
(Germany) AVIA W&S Motorsport	Porsche 718 Cayman GT4 RS Clubsport	165	(Germany) Moritz Oberheim	P	1–3, 6–9
(Germany) Toyo Tires with Ring Racing	Toyota GR Supra GT4 Evo	170	(Japan) Takayuki Kinoshita	Am	1–5
(Germany) Toyo Tires with Ring Racing	Toyota GR Supra GT4 Evo	170	(Germany) Michael Tischner	Am	1–5
(Germany) Toyo Tires with Ring Racing	Toyota GR Supra GT4 Evo	170	(Germany) Heiko Tönges	Am	1–5
(Germany) PROsport-Racing	Aston Martin Vantage AMR GT4	175	(Germany) Michel Albers	Am	1, 4–6
(Germany) PROsport-Racing	Aston Martin Vantage AMR GT4	175	(Germany) Yannick Himmels	Am	1, 4–5
(Germany) PROsport-Racing	Aston Martin Vantage AMR GT4	175	(Germany) Jörg Viebahn	Am	1, 6–9
(Germany) PROsport-Racing	Aston Martin Vantage AMR GT4	175	(Germany) Marek Böckmann	Am	4–5
(Germany) PROsport-Racing	Aston Martin Vantage AMR GT4	175	(Chile) Benjamín Hites	Am	6–9
(Germany) PROsport-Racing	Aston Martin Vantage AMR GT4	175	(Austria) Raphael Rennhofer	Am	9
(Germany) PROsport-Racing	Aston Martin Vantage AMR GT4	191	(Sweden) Markus Lönnroth	Am	7–8
(Germany) PROsport-Racing	Aston Martin Vantage AMR GT4	191	(Sweden) Patrick Skoog	Am	7–8
(United Kingdom) Barton Racing	Toyota GR Supra GT4 Evo	180	(United Kingdom) Harry Barton	Am	1
(United Kingdom) Barton Racing	Toyota GR Supra GT4 Evo	180	(Germany) Luca Link	Am	1
(Germany) FK Performance Motorsport	BMW M4 GT4 Gen II	187	(Switzerland) Ranko Mijatovic	Am	1
(Germany) FK Performance Motorsport	BMW M4 GT4 Gen II	187	(Germany) Nick Wüstenhagen	Am	1
(Germany) FK Performance Motorsport	BMW M4 GT4 Gen II	187	(Germany) Tobias Wahl	Am	1
	Audi R8 LMS GT4	190	(Sweden) Peter Larsen	PA	7–8
	Audi R8 LMS GT4	190	(Sweden) Johan Rosen	PA	7–8
(Germany) Walkenhorst Motorsport	Aston Martin Vantage AMR GT4	191; 74	(Norway) Niklas Abrahamsen	P	2
(Germany) Walkenhorst Motorsport	Aston Martin Vantage AMR GT4	191; 74	(Germany) Hermann Vortkamp	P	2
(Germany) Walkenhorst Motorsport	Aston Martin Vantage AMR GT4	191; 74	(United States) Joshua Joseph Hansen	Am	3–5
(Germany) Walkenhorst Motorsport	Aston Martin Vantage AMR GT4	191; 74	(Norway) Niklas Abrahamsen	Am	3, 6
(Germany) Walkenhorst Motorsport	Aston Martin Vantage AMR GT4	191; 74	(Belgium) Aris Balanian	Am	4–5
(Germany) Walkenhorst Motorsport	Aston Martin Vantage AMR GT4	191; 74	(France) Jean-Christophe David	Am	4–5
(Germany) Walkenhorst Motorsport	Aston Martin Vantage AMR GT4	191; 74	(Germany) Hermann Vortkamp	Am	3
(Germany) Walkenhorst Motorsport	Aston Martin Vantage AMR GT4	191; 74	(United Kingdom) Jack James	Am	6
(Germany) Walkenhorst Motorsport	Aston Martin Vantage AMR GT4	191; 74	(Sweden) Markus Lönnroth	Am	6
Entry Lists:

Icon	Class
P	Pro Cup
PA	Pro/Am Cup
Am	Am Cup

==== Porsche Endurance Trophy Nürburgring ====
Team	Car	No.	Drivers	Class	Rounds
CUP2
(Germany) Black Falcon Team Zimmermann	Porsche 992 GT3 Cup	900	(Germany) Alexander Hardt	PA	2–3, 6–10
(Germany) Black Falcon Team Zimmermann	Porsche 992 GT3 Cup	900	(United States) Peter Ludwig	PA	2–3, 6–10
(Germany) Black Falcon Team Zimmermann	Porsche 992 GT3 Cup	900	(Germany) Maik Rosenberg	PA	2–3, 6–10
(Germany) Black Falcon Team Zimmermann	Porsche 992 GT3 Cup	900	(Germany) Alexander Hardt	Am	1
(Germany) Black Falcon Team Zimmermann	Porsche 992 GT3 Cup	900	(United States) Peter Ludwig	Am	1
(Germany) Black Falcon Team Zimmermann	Porsche 992 GT3 Cup	900	(Germany) Maik Rosenberg	Am	1
(Germany) AV Racing by Black Falcon	Porsche 992 GT3 Cup	902	(United States) Ryan Harrison	G	9
(Germany) AV Racing by Black Falcon	Porsche 992 GT3 Cup	902	(Romania) Alexandru Vasilescu	G	9
(Germany) AV Racing by Black Falcon	Porsche 992 GT3 Cup	902	(Germany) Leon Wassertheurer	G	9
(Germany) 48 LOSCH Motorsport by Black Falcon	Porsche 992 GT3 Cup	948	(Germany) Noah Nagelsdiek	P	1–10
(Germany) 48 LOSCH Motorsport by Black Falcon	Porsche 992 GT3 Cup	948	(Luxembourg) Carlos Rivas	P	1–10
(Germany) 48 LOSCH Motorsport by Black Falcon	Porsche 992 GT3 Cup	948	(Germany) Tobias Müller	P	1–3, 6–10
(Germany) SRS Team Sorg Rennsport	Porsche 992 GT3 Cup	901	(Germany) Fabio Grosse	P	10
(Germany) SRS Team Sorg Rennsport	Porsche 992 GT3 Cup	901	(Switzerland) Patrik Grütter	P	10
(Germany) SRS Team Sorg Rennsport	Porsche 992 GT3 Cup	901	(Germany) Fabio Grosse	PA	1–9
(Germany) SRS Team Sorg Rennsport	Porsche 992 GT3 Cup	901	(Switzerland) Patrik Grütter	PA	1–9
(Germany) SRS Team Sorg Rennsport	Porsche 992 GT3 Cup	901	(Ukraine) Oleksii Kikireshko	PA	1–5
(Belgium) Mühlner Motorsport	Porsche 992 GT3 Cup	904	(Slovakia) Antal Zsigo	P	1–5, 7–10
(Belgium) Mühlner Motorsport	Porsche 992 GT3 Cup	904	(Germany) Marcel Hoppe	P	1, 3, 9
(Belgium) Mühlner Motorsport	Porsche 992 GT3 Cup	904	(Germany) Michael Rebhan	P	1
(Belgium) Mühlner Motorsport	Porsche 992 GT3 Cup	904	(Estonia) Martin Rump	P	2, 7–8
(Belgium) Mühlner Motorsport	Porsche 992 GT3 Cup	904	(Germany) Nick Salewsky	P	3
(Belgium) Mühlner Motorsport	Porsche 992 GT3 Cup	904	(Germany) Janis Waldow	P	4–6
(Belgium) Mühlner Motorsport	Porsche 992 GT3 Cup	904	(Germany) Ben Bünnagel	P	6, 9
(Belgium) Mühlner Motorsport	Porsche 992 GT3 Cup	904	(Ukraine) Ivan Peklin	P	6
(Belgium) Mühlner Motorsport	Porsche 992 GT3 Cup	904	(Netherlands) Jeroen Bleekemolen	P	7–8
(Belgium) Mühlner Motorsport	Porsche 992 GT3 Cup	904	(Germany) Felipe Fernández Laser	P	10
(Belgium) Mühlner Motorsport	Porsche 992 GT3 Cup	921	(Germany) Arne Hoffmeister	P	1–10
(Belgium) Mühlner Motorsport	Porsche 992 GT3 Cup	921	(Germany) David Jahn	P	1–10
(Belgium) Mühlner Motorsport	Porsche 992 GT3 Cup	921	(Germany) Tim Scheerbarth	P	1–10
(Germany) PTerting Sports by Up2Race	Porsche 992 GT3 Cup	905	(Germany) Nico Bastian	P	10
(Germany) PTerting Sports by Up2Race	Porsche 992 GT3 Cup	905	(Ukraine) Oleksii Kikireshko	P	10
(Germany) pb performance	Porsche 992 GT3 Cup	906	(Germany) Ralf-Peter Bonk	Am	2–6, 9–10
(Germany) pb performance	Porsche 992 GT3 Cup	906	(Netherlands) Marco van Ramshorst	Am	2–6, 9–10
(Germany) KKrämer Racing	Porsche 992 GT3 Cup	909; 910	(Germany) Christopher Brück	P	1–5
(Germany) KKrämer Racing	Porsche 992 GT3 Cup	909; 910	(Germany) Michele di Martino	P	1–5
(Germany) KKrämer Racing	Porsche 992 GT3 Cup	909; 910	(Germany) Karsten Krämer	P	10
(Germany) KKrämer Racing	Porsche 992 GT3 Cup	909; 910	(Germany) Fidel Leib	P	10
(Germany) KKrämer Racing	Porsche 992 GT3 Cup	909; 910	(France) Leo Messenger	P	10
(Germany) KKrämer Racing	Porsche 992 GT3 Cup	909; 910	(Germany) Tobias Vazquez-Garcia	P	10
(Germany) KKrämer Racing	Porsche 992 GT3 Cup	909; 910	(Germany) Michele di Martino	PA	7–8
(Germany) KKrämer Racing	Porsche 992 GT3 Cup	909; 910	(Germany) Peter Sander	PA	7–8
(Germany) KKrämer Racing	Porsche 992 GT3 Cup	909; 910	(Germany) Karsten Krämer	PA	7
(Germany) KKrämer Racing	Porsche 992 GT3 Cup	909; 910	(Germany) Fidel Leib	PA	8–9
(Germany) KKrämer Racing	Porsche 992 GT3 Cup	909; 910	(Germany) Tobias Vazquez-Garcia	PA	8–9
(Germany) KKrämer Racing	Porsche 992 GT3 Cup	909; 910	(France) Leo Messenger	PA	9
(Germany) KKrämer Racing	Porsche 992 GT3 Cup	909; 910	(Germany) Karsten Krämer	Am	6
(Germany) KKrämer Racing	Porsche 992 GT3 Cup	909; 910	(France) Leo Messenger	Am	6
(Germany) KKrämer Racing	Porsche 992 GT3 Cup	909; 910	(Germany) Florian Naumann	Am	6
(Germany) KKrämer Racing	Porsche 992 GT3 Cup	909; 910	(Germany) Peter Sander	Am	6
(Germany) KKrämer Racing	Porsche 992 GT3 Cup	912	(Germany) Karsten Krämer	Am	1–3
(Germany) KKrämer Racing	Porsche 992 GT3 Cup	912	(Germany) Sascha Steinhardt	Am	1–3
(Germany) KKrämer Racing	Porsche 992 GT3 Cup	912	(United States) Ace Robey	Am	3–5
(Germany) KKrämer Racing	Porsche 992 GT3 Cup	912	(Germany) Peter Sander	Am	4–5
(Germany) KKrämer Racing	Porsche 992 GT3 Cup	912	(Germany) Guido Tönnessen	Am	4–5
(Germany) KKrämer Racing	Porsche 992 GT3 Cup	929	(Germany) Fidel Leib	'P	3, 6–7
(Germany) KKrämer Racing	Porsche 992 GT3 Cup	929	(Germany) Tobias Vazquez-Garcia	'P	3, 6–7
(Germany) KKrämer Racing	Porsche 992 GT3 Cup	929	(Germany) Christopher Brück	'P	6–7
(Germany) KKrämer Racing	Porsche 992 GT3 Cup	929	(Germany) Michele di Martino	'P	6
(Germany) KKrämer Racing	Porsche 992 GT3 Cup	929	(France) Leo Messenger	'P	7
(Germany) KKrämer Racing	Porsche 992 GT3 Cup	929	(Germany) Fidel Leib	PA	1–2
(Germany) KKrämer Racing	Porsche 992 GT3 Cup	929	(Germany) Tobias Vazquez-Garcia	PA	1–2
(Germany) KKrämer Racing	Porsche 992 GT3 Cup	929	(Germany) Fidel Leib	Am	4–5
(Germany) KKrämer Racing	Porsche 992 GT3 Cup	929	(Germany) Karsten Krämer	Am	4–5
(Germany) KKrämer Racing	Porsche 992 GT3 Cup	929	(Germany) Sascha Steinhardt	Am	4–5
(Germany) Smyrlis Racing	Porsche 992 GT3 Cup	910	(Germany) Alex Koch	PA	1–3
(Germany) Smyrlis Racing	Porsche 992 GT3 Cup	910	(Germany) Niklas Koch	PA	1–3
(Germany) Smyrlis Racing	Porsche 992 GT3 Cup	910	(Germany) Klaus Koch	PA	1–2
(Germany) Smyrlis Racing	Porsche 992 GT3 Cup	910	(Germany) Alex Koch	Am	6–10
(Germany) Smyrlis Racing	Porsche 992 GT3 Cup	910	(Germany) Klaus Koch	Am	6–10
(Germany) Smyrlis Racing	Porsche 992 GT3 Cup	910	(Germany) Niklas Koch	Am	6–10
(Germany) Smyrlis Racing	Porsche 992 GT3 Cup	910	(Germany) Jürgen Oehler	Am	6
(Germany) Smyrlis Racing	Porsche 992 GT3 Cup	910	(Germany) Ioannis Smyrlis	Am	10
(United Kingdom) Team Cameron	Porsche 992 GT3 Cup	913	(United Kingdom) Bill Cameron	Am	1, 3, 7–9
(United Kingdom) Team Cameron	Porsche 992 GT3 Cup	913	(United Kingdom) Jim Cameron	Am	1, 3, 7–9
(Germany) Raceworxx Automotive	Porsche 992 GT3 Cup	917	(Germany) Tim Heinemann	PA	6, 9
(Germany) Raceworxx Automotive	Porsche 992 GT3 Cup	917	(Ukraine) Oleksii Kikireshko	PA	6, 9
(Germany) Raceworxx Automotive	Porsche 992 GT3 Cup	917	(Germany) Alexander Fielenbach	PA	6
(Germany) Raceworxx Automotive	Porsche 992 GT3 Cup	917	(Germany) Nico Bastian	PA	9
(Germany) Team Clickvers.de	Porsche 992 GT3 Cup	919	(Germany) Robin Chrzanowski	P	1, 4–5
(Germany) Team Clickvers.de	Porsche 992 GT3 Cup	919	(Germany) Kersten Jodexnis	P	1, 4–5
(Germany) Team Clickvers.de	Porsche 992 GT3 Cup	919	(Germany) Richard-Sven Karl Jodexnis	P	4–5
(Germany) Team Clickvers.de	Porsche 992 GT3 Cup	919	(Germany) Peter Scharmach	P	1
(Germany) Team Clickvers.de	Porsche 992 GT3 Cup	919	(Germany) Robin Chrzanowski	Am	2–3, 6–9
(Germany) Team Clickvers.de	Porsche 992 GT3 Cup	919	(Germany) Kersten Jodexnis	Am	2–3, 6–9
(Germany) Team Clickvers.de	Porsche 992 GT3 Cup	919	(Germany) Peter Scharmach	Am	2–3, 7–8
(Germany) Team Clickvers.de	Porsche 992 GT3 Cup	919	(Germany) Richard-Sven Karl Jodexnis	Am	6
(Germany) 9und11 Racing	Porsche 992 GT3 Cup	920	(Germany) Georg Goder	Am	6
(Germany) 9und11 Racing	Porsche 992 GT3 Cup	920	(Germany) Ralf Oehme	Am	6
(Germany) 9und11 Racing	Porsche 992 GT3 Cup	920	(Germany) Martin Schlüter	Am	6
(Germany) Huber Motorsport	Porsche 992 GT3 Cup	925	(United States) Christopher Allen	P	4–5
(Germany) Huber Motorsport	Porsche 992 GT3 Cup	925	(United States) Jon Miller	P	4–5
(Germany) Huber Motorsport	Porsche 992 GT3 Cup	925	(United States) Robert Mau	P	4–5
(Germany) Max Kruse Racing	Porsche 992 GT3 Cup	927	(Netherlands) Tom Coronel	PA	2–3, 9
(Germany) Max Kruse Racing	Porsche 992 GT3 Cup	927	(Netherlands) Jan Jaap van Roon	PA	2–3, 9
(Germany) Max Kruse Racing	Porsche 992 GT3 Cup	927	(Netherlands) Rudy van Buren	PA	3
(Germany) Sante Royale Racing Team	Porsche 992 GT3 Cup	930	(Germany) Marius Kiefer	Am	2
(Germany) Sante Royale Racing Team	Porsche 992 GT3 Cup	930	(Germany) Stefan Kiefer	Am	2
(Germany) Sante Royale Racing Team	Porsche 992 GT3 Cup	930	(Austria) Luca Rettenbacher	Am	2
(Germany) RPM Racing	Porsche 992 GT3 Cup	935	(Sweden) Niclas Jönsson	G	2–3
(Germany) RPM Racing	Porsche 992 GT3 Cup	935	(United States) Tracy Krohn	G	2–3
CUP3
(United Kingdom) Breakell Racing	Porsche 718 Cayman GT4 RS Clubsport	932	(United Kingdom) James Breakell	Am	4–5
(United Kingdom) Breakell Racing	Porsche 718 Cayman GT4 RS Clubsport	932	(United Kingdom) Martin Rich	Am	4–5
(Belgium) Mühlner Motorsport	Porsche 718 Cayman GT4 RS Clubsport	939	(Germany) Janis Waldow	P	1–3
(Belgium) Mühlner Motorsport	Porsche 718 Cayman GT4 RS Clubsport	939	(Germany) Thorsten Jung	P	1
(Belgium) Mühlner Motorsport	Porsche 718 Cayman GT4 RS Clubsport	939	(Germany) Nico Bastian	P	3
(Belgium) Mühlner Motorsport	Porsche 718 Cayman GT4 RS Clubsport	939	(Lithuania) Gustas Grinbergas	P	4–5
(Belgium) Mühlner Motorsport	Porsche 718 Cayman GT4 RS Clubsport	939	(Lithuania) Eduardas Klepikas	P	4–5
(Belgium) Mühlner Motorsport	Porsche 718 Cayman GT4 RS Clubsport	939	(Belgium) Aris Balanian	P	6
(Belgium) Mühlner Motorsport	Porsche 718 Cayman GT4 RS Clubsport	939	(Germany) Yannik Himmels	P	6
(Belgium) Mühlner Motorsport	Porsche 718 Cayman GT4 RS Clubsport	939	(Germany) Christopher Rink	P	6
(Belgium) Mühlner Motorsport	Porsche 718 Cayman GT4 RS Clubsport	939	(Germany) Yannik Himmels	PA	7–8, 10
(Belgium) Mühlner Motorsport	Porsche 718 Cayman GT4 RS Clubsport	939	(Belgium) Aris Balanian	PA	7–8
(Belgium) Mühlner Motorsport	Porsche 718 Cayman GT4 RS Clubsport	939	(Germany) Janis Waldow	PA	7–8
(Belgium) Mühlner Motorsport	Porsche 718 Cayman GT4 RS Clubsport	939	(Germany) Kai Riemer	PA	10
(Belgium) Mühlner Motorsport	Porsche 718 Cayman GT4 RS Clubsport	939	(Germany) Andre Duve	Am	9
(Belgium) Mühlner Motorsport	Porsche 718 Cayman GT4 RS Clubsport	939	(Germany) Yannik Himmels	Am	9
(Germany) Adrenalin Motorsport Team Mainhattan Wheels	Porsche 718 Cayman GT4 RS Clubsport	940	(Norway) Oskar Sandberg	P	1–8
(Germany) Adrenalin Motorsport Team Mainhattan Wheels	Porsche 718 Cayman GT4 RS Clubsport	940	(United States) Nico Silva	P	1–8
(Germany) Adrenalin Motorsport Team Mainhattan Wheels	Porsche 718 Cayman GT4 RS Clubsport	940	(Austria) David Griessner	P	1–6
(Germany) Adrenalin Motorsport Team Mainhattan Wheels	Porsche 718 Cayman GT4 RS Clubsport	940	(Germany) Yannick Fübrich	P	7–8
(Germany) Adrenalin Motorsport Team Mainhattan Wheels	Porsche 718 Cayman GT4 RS Clubsport	940	(Germany) Tim Lukas Müller	PA	10
(Germany) Adrenalin Motorsport Team Mainhattan Wheels	Porsche 718 Cayman GT4 RS Clubsport	940	(Norway) Peder Saltvedt	PA	10
(Germany) Adrenalin Motorsport Team Mainhattan Wheels	Porsche 718 Cayman GT4 RS Clubsport	940	(Norway) Oskar Sandberg	PA	10
(Germany) Adrenalin Motorsport Team Mainhattan Wheels	Porsche 718 Cayman GT4 RS Clubsport	940	(United Kingdom) Farquini Deott	Am	L
(Germany) Adrenalin Motorsport Team Mainhattan Wheels	Porsche 718 Cayman GT4 RS Clubsport	940	(United Kingdom) Ben Pitch	Am	L
(Germany) Adrenalin Motorsport Team Mainhattan Wheels	Porsche 718 Cayman GT4 RS Clubsport	940	(Germany) Aaron Wenisch	Am	L
(Germany) Adrenalin Motorsport Team Mainhattan Wheels	Porsche 718 Cayman GT4 RS Clubsport	941	(Germany) Nick Deißler	P	4–5
(Germany) Adrenalin Motorsport Team Mainhattan Wheels	Porsche 718 Cayman GT4 RS Clubsport	941	(France) Leo Messenger	P	4–5
(Germany) Adrenalin Motorsport Team Mainhattan Wheels	Porsche 718 Cayman GT4 RS Clubsport	941	(Germany) Aaron Wenisch	P	4–5
(Germany) Adrenalin Motorsport Team Mainhattan Wheels	Porsche 718 Cayman GT4 RS Clubsport	941	(Germany) Nick Deißler	Am	1–3, 6–10
(Germany) Adrenalin Motorsport Team Mainhattan Wheels	Porsche 718 Cayman GT4 RS Clubsport	941	(Germany) Stefan Kruse	Am	1–3, 6–10
(Germany) Adrenalin Motorsport Team Mainhattan Wheels	Porsche 718 Cayman GT4 RS Clubsport	941	(Germany) Aaron Wenisch	Am	1–3, 6–10
(Germany) 9und11 Racing	Porsche 718 Cayman GT4 RS Clubsport	944	(Germany) Leonard Oehme	P	3, 7–10
(Germany) 9und11 Racing	Porsche 718 Cayman GT4 RS Clubsport	944	(Germany) Moritz Oehme	P	3, 7–10
(Germany) 9und11 Racing	Porsche 718 Cayman GT4 RS Clubsport	944	(Germany) Leonard Oehme	PA	2
(Germany) 9und11 Racing	Porsche 718 Cayman GT4 RS Clubsport	944	(Germany) Moritz Oehme	PA	2
(Germany) 9und11 Racing	Porsche 718 Cayman GT4 RS Clubsport	944	(Germany) Leonard Oehme	Am	1, 6
(Germany) 9und11 Racing	Porsche 718 Cayman GT4 RS Clubsport	944	(Germany) Moritz Oehme	Am	1, 6
(Thailand) Renazzo Motor with mcchip-dkr	Porsche 718 Cayman GT4 RS Clubsport	945	(Germany) Markus Nölken	P	4–5
(Thailand) Renazzo Motor with mcchip-dkr	Porsche 718 Cayman GT4 RS Clubsport	945	(Germany) Ulrich Daniel Nölken	P	4–5
(Thailand) Renazzo Motor with mcchip-dkr	Porsche 718 Cayman GT4 RS Clubsport	945	(Germany) Heiko Hammel	P	10
(Thailand) Renazzo Motor with mcchip-dkr	Porsche 718 Cayman GT4 RS Clubsport	945	(Germany) Janis Waldow	P	10
(Thailand) Renazzo Motor with mcchip-dkr	Porsche 718 Cayman GT4 RS Clubsport	945	(Germany) Markus Nölken	Am	1–2, 6, 9, L
(Thailand) Renazzo Motor with mcchip-dkr	Porsche 718 Cayman GT4 RS Clubsport	945	(Germany) Otto Klohs	Am	1–2, 7–8, L
(Thailand) Renazzo Motor with mcchip-dkr	Porsche 718 Cayman GT4 RS Clubsport	945	(Germany) Ulrich Daniel Nölken	Am	6, 9
(Thailand) Renazzo Motor with mcchip-dkr	Porsche 718 Cayman GT4 RS Clubsport	945	(Germany) Nils Steinberg	Am	7–8
(Germany) SRS Team Sorg Rennsport	Porsche 718 Cayman GT4 RS Clubsport	949	(United States) Jake Walker	P	4–5
(Germany) SRS Team Sorg Rennsport	Porsche 718 Cayman GT4 RS Clubsport	949	(United States) Jaden Lander	P	4–5
(Germany) SRS Team Sorg Rennsport	Porsche 718 Cayman GT4 RS Clubsport	949	(Germany) Stefan Beyer	PA	8–10
(Germany) SRS Team Sorg Rennsport	Porsche 718 Cayman GT4 RS Clubsport	949	(Latvia) Kasparas Vingilis	PA	8–10
(Germany) SRS Team Sorg Rennsport	Porsche 718 Cayman GT4 RS Clubsport	949	(Germany) Maximilian Eisberg	PA	8
(Germany) SRS Team Sorg Rennsport	Porsche 718 Cayman GT4 RS Clubsport	949	(Germany) Tim Lukas Müller	PA	9
(Germany) SRS Team Sorg Rennsport	Porsche 718 Cayman GT4 RS Clubsport	949	(Austria) Bernhard Wagner	PA	10
(Germany) SRS Team Sorg Rennsport	Porsche 718 Cayman GT4 RS Clubsport	949	(Germany) Stefan Beyer	Am	1–3, 7
(Germany) SRS Team Sorg Rennsport	Porsche 718 Cayman GT4 RS Clubsport	949	(Germany) Jan-Niklas Stieler	Am	1, 6
(Germany) SRS Team Sorg Rennsport	Porsche 718 Cayman GT4 RS Clubsport	949	(Austria) Bernhard Wagner	Am	1
(Germany) SRS Team Sorg Rennsport	Porsche 718 Cayman GT4 RS Clubsport	949	(Latvia) Kasparas Vingilis	Am	2–3, 6–7
(Germany) SRS Team Sorg Rennsport	Porsche 718 Cayman GT4 RS Clubsport	949	(Germany) Björn Simon	Am	2
(Germany) SRS Team Sorg Rennsport	Porsche 718 Cayman GT4 RS Clubsport	949	(Germany) Finn Wiebelhaus	Am	3
(Germany) SRS Team Sorg Rennsport	Porsche 718 Cayman GT4 RS Clubsport	949	(United Kingdom) Joshua Hislop	Am	6
(Germany) SRS Team Sorg Rennsport	Porsche 718 Cayman GT4 RS Clubsport	949	(Germany) Maximilian Eisberg	Am	7
(Germany) SRS Team Sorg Rennsport	Porsche 718 Cayman GT4 RS Clubsport	959	(Germany) Heiko Eichenberg	P	1–10
(Germany) SRS Team Sorg Rennsport	Porsche 718 Cayman GT4 RS Clubsport	959	(United Kingdom) Harley Haughton	P	1–10
(Germany) SRS Team Sorg Rennsport	Porsche 718 Cayman GT4 RS Clubsport	969	(Sweden) Tommy Gräberg	PA	10
(Germany) SRS Team Sorg Rennsport	Porsche 718 Cayman GT4 RS Clubsport	969	(United Kingdom) Joshua Hislop	PA	10
(Germany) SRS Team Sorg Rennsport	Porsche 718 Cayman GT4 RS Clubsport	969	(Germany) Jan Niklas Stieler	PA	10
(Germany) SRS Team Sorg Rennsport	Porsche 718 Cayman GT4 RS Clubsport	969	(Sweden) Tommy Gräberg	Am	1–3, 7–9
(Germany) SRS Team Sorg Rennsport	Porsche 718 Cayman GT4 RS Clubsport	969	(United Kingdom) Joshua Hislop	Am	1–3, 7–9
(Germany) SRS Team Sorg Rennsport	Porsche 718 Cayman GT4 RS Clubsport	969	(Germany) Jan Niklas Stieler	Am	2–3, 7–9
(Germany) SRS Team Sorg Rennsport	Porsche 718 Cayman GT4 RS Clubsport	969	(Germany) Maximilian Volz	Am	6
(Germany) SRS Team Sorg Rennsport	Porsche 718 Cayman GT4 RS Clubsport	969	(Austria) Bernhard Wagner	Am	6
(Germany) SRS Team Sorg Rennsport	Porsche 718 Cayman GT4 RS Clubsport	979	(Germany) Alexander Müller	Am	1–5
(Germany) SRS Team Sorg Rennsport	Porsche 718 Cayman GT4 RS Clubsport	979	(Austria) Bernhard Wagner	Am	2–5, 7–8
(Germany) SRS Team Sorg Rennsport	Porsche 718 Cayman GT4 RS Clubsport	979	(Germany) Finn Wiebelhaus	Am	2
(Germany) SRS Team Sorg Rennsport	Porsche 718 Cayman GT4 RS Clubsport	979	(Germany) Henning Eschweiler	Am	3
(Germany) SRS Team Sorg Rennsport	Porsche 718 Cayman GT4 RS Clubsport	979	(Germany) Maximilian Volz	Am	4–5, 7–8
(Germany) SRS Team Sorg Rennsport	Porsche 718 Cayman GT4 RS Clubsport	979	(Germany) Christian Coen	Am	7
(Germany) Schmickler Performance powered by Ravenol	Porsche 718 Cayman GT4 RS Clubsport	950	(Germany) Horst Baumann	P	1–2
(Germany) Schmickler Performance powered by Ravenol	Porsche 718 Cayman GT4 RS Clubsport	950	(Germany) Markus Schmickler	P	1–2
(Germany) Schmickler Performance powered by Ravenol	Porsche 718 Cayman GT4 RS Clubsport	950	(Germany) Stefan Schmickler	P	1–2
(Germany) Schmickler Performance powered by Ravenol	Porsche 718 Cayman GT4 RS Clubsport	950	(Germany) Horst Baumann	PA	3, 6–10, L
(Germany) Schmickler Performance powered by Ravenol	Porsche 718 Cayman GT4 RS Clubsport	950	(Germany) Stefan Schmickler	PA	3, 6–10, L
(Germany) Schmickler Performance powered by Ravenol	Porsche 718 Cayman GT4 RS Clubsport	950	(Germany) Markus Schmickler	PA	3, 6–10
(Germany) Team Speedworxx	Porsche 718 Cayman GT4 RS Clubsport	955	(Germany) Alexander Fielenbach	PA	1–3, 6–9, L
(Germany) Team Speedworxx	Porsche 718 Cayman GT4 RS Clubsport	955	(Germany) Franz Linden	PA	1–3, 6–9, L
(Germany) Team Speedworxx	Porsche 718 Cayman GT4 RS Clubsport	955	(Germany) Rüdiger Schicht	PA	1–3, 6–9
(Germany) Team Speedworxx	Porsche 718 Cayman GT4 RS Clubsport	955	(Germany) Erik Braun	PA	L
(Germany) Team Speedworxx	Porsche 718 Cayman GT4 RS Clubsport	955	(Germany) Erik Braun	Am	10
(Germany) Team Speedworxx	Porsche 718 Cayman GT4 RS Clubsport	955	(Germany) Franz Linden	Am	10
(Germany) Team Speedworxx	Porsche 718 Cayman GT4 RS Clubsport	955	(Germany) Rüdiger Schicht	Am	10
	Porsche 718 Cayman GT4 RS Clubsport	956	(France) Olivier Baharian	G	7–8
	Porsche 718 Cayman GT4 RS Clubsport	956	(Germany) Carsten Kautz	G	7–8
	Porsche 718 Cayman GT4 RS Clubsport	956	(Luxembourg) Gabriel Rindone	G	7–8
(Germany) W&S Motorsport	Porsche 718 Cayman GT4 RS Clubsport	961	(Germany) Oliver Kunz	P	2
(Germany) W&S Motorsport	Porsche 718 Cayman GT4 RS Clubsport	961	(Germany) Fabian Peitzmeier	P	2
(Germany) W&S Motorsport	Porsche 718 Cayman GT4 RS Clubsport	961	(Germany) Peter Siebert	P	2
(Germany) W&S Motorsport	Porsche 718 Cayman GT4 RS Clubsport	961	(Germany) Oliver Kunz	Am	3, 6–7, 9–10
(Germany) W&S Motorsport	Porsche 718 Cayman GT4 RS Clubsport	961	(Germany) Peter Siebert	Am	3, 6–7, 9–10
(Germany) W&S Motorsport	Porsche 718 Cayman GT4 RS Clubsport	961	(Germany) Lion Düker	Am	6–7, 9–10
(Germany) W&S Motorsport	Porsche 718 Cayman GT4 RS Clubsport	962	(Germany) Joshua Bednarski	P	1, 3, 6–10
(Germany) W&S Motorsport	Porsche 718 Cayman GT4 RS Clubsport	962	(Germany) Lorenz Stegmann	P	1, 3, 6–10
(Germany) W&S Motorsport	Porsche 718 Cayman GT4 RS Clubsport	962	(Germany) Kai Riemer	P	1, 3, 7–8
(Germany) W&S Motorsport	Porsche 718 Cayman GT4 RS Clubsport	962	(Germany) Joshua Bednarski	PA	2
(Germany) W&S Motorsport	Porsche 718 Cayman GT4 RS Clubsport	962	(Germany) Kai Riemer	PA	2
(Germany) W&S Motorsport	Porsche 718 Cayman GT4 RS Clubsport	962	(Germany) Lorenz Stegmann	PA	2
(Germany) W&S Motorsport	Porsche 718 Cayman GT4 RS Clubsport	982	(Germany) René Höber	Am	1–3, 6–10
(Germany) W&S Motorsport	Porsche 718 Cayman GT4 RS Clubsport	982	(Germany) Richard-Sven Karl Jodexnis	Am	1–3, 6–10
(Germany) W&S Motorsport	Porsche 718 Cayman GT4 RS Clubsport	982	(Germany) Christoph Krombach	Am	1–3, 6–10
(Germany) AV Racing by Black Falcon	Porsche 718 Cayman GT4 RS Clubsport	964	(United States) Ryan Harrison	G	3
(Germany) AV Racing by Black Falcon	Porsche 718 Cayman GT4 RS Clubsport	964	(Switzerland) Boris Hrubesch	G	3
(Germany) AV Racing by Black Falcon	Porsche 718 Cayman GT4 RS Clubsport	964	(Germany) Otto Blank	G	7–8
(Germany) AV Racing by Black Falcon	Porsche 718 Cayman GT4 RS Clubsport	964	(Germany) Daniel Schwerfeld	G	7–8
(Germany) AV Racing by Black Falcon	Porsche 718 Cayman GT4 RS Clubsport	964	(Switzerland) "TAKIS"	G	7–8
(Germany) AV Racing by Black Falcon	Porsche 718 Cayman GT4 RS Clubsport	964	(United States) Malcolm Harrison	G	10
(Germany) AV Racing by Black Falcon	Porsche 718 Cayman GT4 RS Clubsport	964	(Luxembourg) Chester Kieffer	G	10
(Germany) AV Racing by Black Falcon	Porsche 718 Cayman GT4 RS Clubsport	964	(Netherlands) Flynt Schuring	G	10
(Germany) asBest Racing	Porsche 718 Cayman GT4 RS Clubsport	966	(Germany) Kim Berwanger	Am	1–3, 6–10, L
(Germany) asBest Racing	Porsche 718 Cayman GT4 RS Clubsport	966	(Germany) Christian Kohlhaas	Am	1–3, 6–10, L
(Germany) asBest Racing	Porsche 718 Cayman GT4 RS Clubsport	966	(Germany) Heinz Dolfen	Am	1–2, 6–10
(Germany) asBest Racing	Porsche 718 Cayman GT4 RS Clubsport	966	(Germany) John Lee Schambony	Am	3
(Germany) asBest Racing	Porsche 718 Cayman GT4 RS Clubsport	966	(Germany) Etienne Ploenes	Am	6
(Germany) EiFelkind Racing	Porsche 718 Cayman GT4 RS Clubsport	977	(Germany) Desiree Müller	Am	1–3, 6–8, L
(Germany) EiFelkind Racing	Porsche 718 Cayman GT4 RS Clubsport	977	(Germany) Tim Lukas Müller	Am	1–3, 6–8, L
(Germany) EiFelkind Racing	Porsche 718 Cayman GT4 RS Clubsport	977	(Austria) Michael Fischer	Am	1
(Germany) EiFelkind Racing	Porsche 718 Cayman GT4 RS Clubsport	977	(Switzerland) Marc Arn	Am	7–8, L
(Germany) EiFelkind Racing	Porsche 718 Cayman GT4 RS Clubsport	977	(Germany) Peter Elkmann	Am	L
(Germany) EiFelkind Racing	Porsche 718 Cayman GT4 RS Clubsport	977	(Germany) Thomas Ardelt	P	4–5
(Germany) EiFelkind Racing	Porsche 718 Cayman GT4 RS Clubsport	977	(Germany) Henning Hausmeier	P	4–5
(Germany) EiFelkind Racing	Porsche 718 Cayman GT4 RS Clubsport	977	(Germany) Tim Lukas Müller	P	4–5
(Germany) KKrämer Racing	Porsche 718 Cayman GT4 RS Clubsport	978	(Germany) Peter Sander	G	1–3
(Germany) KKrämer Racing	Porsche 718 Cayman GT4 RS Clubsport	978	(Germany) Jürgen Oehler	G	1
(Germany) KKrämer Racing	Porsche 718 Cayman GT4 RS Clubsport	978	(Germany) John Finken	G	2
(Germany) KKrämer Racing	Porsche 718 Cayman GT4 RS Clubsport	978	(United Kingdom) Oliver Allwood	G	3, L
(Germany) KKrämer Racing	Porsche 718 Cayman GT4 RS Clubsport	978	(Germany) Marco Lamsouguer	G	6, 9, L
(Germany) KKrämer Racing	Porsche 718 Cayman GT4 RS Clubsport	978	(Poland) Jacek Pydys	G	6
(Germany) KKrämer Racing	Porsche 718 Cayman GT4 RS Clubsport	978	(Germany) Guido Tönnessen	G	L
(Germany) Lionspeed GP	Porsche 718 Cayman GT4 RS Clubsport	980	(United Kingdom) Chris Lulham	G	6–7
(Germany) Lionspeed GP	Porsche 718 Cayman GT4 RS Clubsport	980	(Belgium) Matisse Lismont	G	6
(Germany) Lionspeed GP	Porsche 718 Cayman GT4 RS Clubsport	980	(United States) Kyle Tilley	G	6
(Germany) Lionspeed GP	Porsche 718 Cayman GT4 RS Clubsport	980	(Netherlands) Max Verstappen	G	7
(Switzerland) BSL Racing Team	Porsche 718 Cayman GT4 RS Clubsport	999	(Switzerland) Marcel Zimmermann	P	4–5
(Switzerland) BSL Racing Team	Porsche 718 Cayman GT4 RS Clubsport	999	(Switzerland) Marc Arn	P	4–5
(Switzerland) BSL Racing Team	Porsche 718 Cayman GT4 RS Clubsport	999	(Germany) Philipp Frommenwiler	P	4–5
Entry Lists:

Icon	Class
992 entries
Icon	Class
P	Cup 2-Pro
PA	Cup 2-Pro/Am
Am	Cup 2-Am
G	Guest
Cayman GT4 entries
Icon	Class
P	Cup 3-Pro
PA	Cup 3-Pro/Am
Am	Cup 3-Am
G	Guest

=== Other classes ===
==== NLS specials ====
Team	Car	No.	Drivers	Rounds
SP-X
SP-Pro
(Germany) Toyo Tires with Ring Racing	Porsche 911 GT3 Cup MR Pro	347	(Germany) Andreas Gülden	1–3, 6, 9–10
(Germany) Toyo Tires with Ring Racing	Porsche 911 GT3 Cup MR Pro	347	(Germany) Marc Hennerici	1–3, 6, 9–10
(Germany) Toyo Tires with Ring Racing	Porsche 911 GT3 Cup MR Pro	347	(Germany) Tim Sandtler	1–3, 6, 9–10
SP8T
(Germany) ME Motorsport	BMW M4 GT4 Gen II	66	(Germany) Markus Eichele	4–5
(Germany) ME Motorsport	BMW M4 GT4 Gen II	66	(Germany) Philip Wiskirchen	4–5
(Japan) TOYOTA GAZOO ROOKIE Racing	Toyota GR Supra GT4 Evo	110	(Japan) Masahiro Sasaki	2
(Japan) TOYOTA GAZOO ROOKIE Racing	Toyota GR Supra GT4 Evo	110	(Japan) Naoya Gamou	2
(Japan) TOYOTA GAZOO ROOKIE Racing	Toyota GR Supra GT4 Evo	110	(Japan) Tatsuya Kataoka	2
(Japan) TOYOTA GAZOO ROOKIE Racing	Toyota GR Supra GT4 Evo	110	(Japan) Takamitsu Matsui	2
(Germany) PROsport-Racing	Aston Martin Vantage AMR GT8R	140	(Belgium) Guido Dumarey	1–3, 6–10
(Germany) PROsport-Racing	Aston Martin Vantage AMR GT8R	140	(Belgium) Maxime Dumarey	1–3, 6–10
(Germany) PROsport-Racing	Aston Martin Vantage AMR GT8R	140	(Germany) Marek Böckmann	6
(Germany) PROsport-Racing	Aston Martin Vantage AMR GT8R	175	(Germany) Michel Albers / "Alboretto"	2–3, 10
(Germany) PROsport-Racing	Aston Martin Vantage AMR GT8R	175	(Germany) Jörg Viebahn	2–3, 10
(Germany) PROsport-Racing	Aston Martin Vantage AMR GT8R	175	(Germany) Yannick Himmels	2–3
(Germany) PROsport-Racing	Aston Martin Vantage AMR GT8R	175	(Chile) Benjamín Hites	10
(Germany) PROsport-Racing	Aston Martin Vantage AMR GT8R	191	(Germany) Marek Böckmann	9
(Germany) PROsport-Racing	Aston Martin Vantage AMR GT8R	191	(Germany) Raphael Rennhofer	9
	BMW M235i Racing	141	(Belgium) Alexander Borgmans	3
	BMW M235i Racing	141	(Belgium) Maxim De Witte	3
(Germany) SR Motorsport by Schnitzelalm	Mercedes-AMG GT4	144	(Germany) Jay Mo Härtling	10
(Germany) SR Motorsport by Schnitzelalm	Mercedes-AMG GT4	144	(Germany) Kenneth Heyer	10
(Germany) SR Motorsport by Schnitzelalm	Mercedes-AMG GT4	144	(Germany) Tim Neuser	10
(Singapore) Giti Tire Motorsport by WS Racing	BMW M4 GT4 Gen II	146	(Germany) Janina Schall	1–3, 7–9, L
(Singapore) Giti Tire Motorsport by WS Racing	BMW M4 GT4 Gen II	146	(Germany) Carrie Schreiner	1–3, 9, L
(Singapore) Giti Tire Motorsport by WS Racing	BMW M4 GT4 Gen II	146	(Liechtenstein) Fabienne Wohlwend	1, 7–8
(Singapore) Giti Tire Motorsport by WS Racing	BMW M4 GT4 Gen II	146	(Netherlands) Beitske Visser	2, 8
(Singapore) Giti Tire Motorsport by WS Racing	BMW M4 GT4 Gen II	146	(United Kingdom) Pippa Mann	3
(Singapore) Giti Tire Motorsport by WS Racing	BMW M4 GT4 Gen II	146	(Latvia) Patricija Stalidzane	7
(Germany) Team Bilstein by Black Falcon	BMW M4 GT4 Evo (G82)	150	(United Kingdom) Steve Alvarez Brown	1–6, 10
(Germany) Team Bilstein by Black Falcon	BMW M4 GT4 Evo (G82)	150	(United Kingdom) Jimmy Broadbent	1–6, 10
(Germany) Team Bilstein by Black Falcon	BMW M4 GT4 Evo (G82)	150	(Netherlands) Misha Charoudin	1–6, 10
(Germany) Team Bilstein by Black Falcon	BMW M4 GT4 Evo (G82)	150	(Germany) Manuel Metzger	1–6, 10
(Germany) Schmickler Performance powered by Ravenol	BMW M4 GT4 Evo (G82)	151	(Germany) Sascha Kloft	L
(Germany) Schmickler Performance powered by Ravenol	BMW M4 GT4 Evo (G82)	151	(Germany) Michael Luther	L
(Germany) Schmickler Performance powered by Ravenol	BMW M4 GT4 Evo (G82)	151	(Germany) Markus Schmickler	L
(Germany) Plusline Motorsport	BMW M4 GT4 Gen II	155	(Germany) Philipp Gresek	1–10, L
(Germany) Plusline Motorsport	BMW M4 GT4 Gen II	155	(Germany) Richard Gresek	1–10, L
(Canada) ST Racing	BMW M4 GT4 Gen II	158	(Canada) Samantha Tan	2
(Canada) ST Racing	BMW M4 GT4 Gen II	158	(United States) Neil Verhagen	2
(Germany) Toyo Tires with Ring Racing	Toyota GR Supra GT4 Evo	160	(Japan) Yuichi Nakayama	1, 4–5, 7–8
(Germany) Toyo Tires with Ring Racing	Toyota GR Supra GT4 Evo	160	(Japan) Kazuto Kotaka	1, 4–5
(Germany) Toyo Tires with Ring Racing	Toyota GR Supra GT4 Evo	160	(Japan) Miki Koyama	4–8
(Germany) Toyo Tires with Ring Racing	Toyota GR Supra GT4 Evo	160	(France) Giuliano Alesi	4–6
(Germany) Toyo Tires with Ring Racing	Toyota GR Supra GT4 Evo	170	(Japan) Miki Koyama	9, L
(Germany) Toyo Tires with Ring Racing	Toyota GR Supra GT4 Evo	170	(France) Giuliano Alesi	9
(Germany) Toyo Tires with Ring Racing	Toyota GR Supra GT4 Evo	170	(Japan) Kazuto Kotaka	L
(Germany) AV Racing by Black Falcon	BMW M4 GT4 Gen II	162	(United States) Judson Holt	L
(Germany) AV Racing by Black Falcon	BMW M4 GT4 Gen II	162	(United States) David Ogburn	L
(Germany) AV Racing by Black Falcon	BMW M4 GT4 Gen II	162	(United States) Denny Stripling	L
(Japan) Toyota Gazoo Racing	Toyota GR Supra GT4 Evo	172	(France) Giuliano Alesi	1, 3
(Japan) Toyota Gazoo Racing	Toyota GR Supra GT4 Evo	172	(Japan) Miki Koyama	1, 3
(Japan) Toyota Gazoo Racing	Toyota GR Supra GT4 Evo	172	(Canada) Esteban Masson	1, 3
(Japan) Toyota Gazoo Racing	Toyota GR Supra GT4 Evo	173	(France) Giuliano Alesi	1, 3
(Japan) Toyota Gazoo Racing	Toyota GR Supra GT4 Evo	173	(Japan) Miki Koyama	1, 3
(Japan) Toyota Gazoo Racing	Toyota GR Supra GT4 Evo	173	(Canada) Esteban Masson	1, 3
(Hong Kong) KCMG	Toyota GR Supra GT4 Evo	172	(Italy) Edoardo Liberati	7–8
(Hong Kong) KCMG	Toyota GR Supra GT4 Evo	172	(Japan) Shunji Okumoto	7–8
(Hong Kong) KCMG	Toyota GR Supra GT4 Evo	172	(Japan) Sho Tsuboi	7–8
(Hong Kong) KCMG	Toyota GR Supra GT4 Evo	172	(Japan) Nirei Fukuzumi	9
(Hong Kong) KCMG	Toyota GR Supra GT4 Evo	172	(Japan) Kazuto Kotaka	9
(Hong Kong) KCMG	Toyota GR Supra GT4 Evo	172	(Japan) Yuichi Nakayama	9
(Hong Kong) KCMG	Toyota GR Supra GT4 Evo	173	(Italy) Edoardo Liberati	7–9
(Hong Kong) KCMG	Toyota GR Supra GT4 Evo	173	(Japan) Shunji Okumoto	7–8
(Hong Kong) KCMG	Toyota GR Supra GT4 Evo	173	(Japan) Sho Tsuboi	7–8
(Hong Kong) KCMG	Toyota GR Supra GT4 Evo	173	(Japan) Nirei Fukuzumi	9
(Hong Kong) KCMG	Toyota GR Supra GT4 Evo	173	(Canada) Esteban Masson	9
(Germany) FK Performance Motorsport	BMW M4 GT4 Gen II	187	(Switzerland) Ranko Mijatovic	2–10
(Germany) FK Performance Motorsport	BMW M4 GT4 Gen II	187	(Germany) Nick Wüstenhagen	2–10
(Germany) FK Performance Motorsport	BMW M4 GT4 Gen II	187	(Germany) Tobias Wahl	2–6
(Germany) FK Performance Motorsport	BMW M4 GT4 Gen II	187	(Germany) Reinhold Renger	7–8, 10
(Germany) FK Performance Motorsport	BMW M4 GT4 Gen II	188	(Switzerland) Ranko Mijatovic	4–5
(Germany) FK Performance Motorsport	BMW M4 GT4 Gen II	188	(Germany) Nick Wüstenhagen	4–5
(Germany) FK Performance Motorsport	BMW M4 GT4 Gen II	188	(Germany) Tobias Wahl	4–5
(Switzerland) Hofor Racing by Bonk Motorsport	BMW M4 GT4 Gen II	188	(Germany) Felix Partl	6
(Switzerland) Hofor Racing by Bonk Motorsport	BMW M4 GT4 Gen II	188	(Germany) Maximilian Partl	6
(Switzerland) Hofor Racing by Bonk Motorsport	BMW M4 GT4 Gen II	188	(Germany) Jörg Weidinger	6
(Switzerland) Hofor Racing by Bonk Motorsport	BMW M4 GT4 Gen II	189	(Germany) Michael Bonk	1–10
(Switzerland) Hofor Racing by Bonk Motorsport	BMW M4 GT4 Gen II	189	(Switzerland) Martin Kroll	1–10
(Switzerland) Hofor Racing by Bonk Motorsport	BMW M4 GT4 Gen II	189	(Germany) Maximilian Partl	2–3, 6
(Switzerland) Hofor Racing by Bonk Motorsport	BMW M4 GT4 Gen II	189	(Germany) Rainer Partl	2, 10
(Switzerland) Hofor Racing by Bonk Motorsport	BMW M4 GT4 Gen II	189	(Germany) Thorsten Wolter	4–5
(Switzerland) Hofor Racing by Bonk Motorsport	BMW M4 GT4 Gen II	189	(Germany) Felix Partl	4–5
(Switzerland) Hofor Racing by Bonk Motorsport	BMW M4 GT4 Gen II	189	(Australia) Michael Bailey	8–9
SP8
SP7
(Germany) Black Falcon Team Zimmermann	Porsche 718 Cayman GT4 RS Clubsport	70	(Germany) Axel Sartingen	1–3, 6–10
(Germany) Black Falcon Team Zimmermann	Porsche 718 Cayman GT4 RS Clubsport	70	(Germany) David Barst	1, 3–6, 8–10
(Germany) Black Falcon Team Zimmermann	Porsche 718 Cayman GT4 RS Clubsport	70	(Germany) Nils Schwenk	1, 4–5, 7, 10
(Germany) Black Falcon Team Zimmermann	Porsche 718 Cayman GT4 RS Clubsport	70	(Germany) Anton Ruf	2, 4–6, 9
(Germany) Black Falcon Team Zimmermann	Porsche 718 Cayman GT4 RS Clubsport	70	(Germany) Leon Wassertheurer	6–8
	Porsche 718 Cayman GT4 RS Clubsport	75	(Germany) Wolf Denis Robin	6
	Porsche 718 Cayman GT4 RS Clubsport	75	(Germany) Thorsten Lingnau	6
(Switzerland) BSL Racing Team	Porsche 718 Cayman GT4 RS Clubsport	77	(Switzerland) Philipp Hagnauer	2, 4–5
(Switzerland) BSL Racing Team	Porsche 718 Cayman GT4 RS Clubsport	77	(United Kingdom) Alexander Walker	2, 4–5
(Switzerland) BSL Racing Team	Porsche 718 Cayman GT4 RS Clubsport	77	(Germany) Christoph Ruhrmann	4–5
(Germany) RPM Racing	Porsche 991 Cup	78	(Czech Republic) Milan Kodídek	3, 6–8
(Germany) RPM Racing	Porsche 991 Cup	78	(Belgium) Kris Cools	3, 6–7
(Germany) RPM Racing	Porsche 991 Cup	78	(Germany) Ralf Schall	6–7
(Germany) RPM Racing	Porsche 991 Cup	78	(Germany) Mario Farnbacher	6
(Germany) RPM Racing	Porsche 991 Cup	78	(Germany) Tim Breidenbach	8
(Germany) RPM Racing	Porsche 991 Cup	78	(Germany) Philip Hamprecht	8
	Porsche 718 Cayman GT4 RS Clubsport	80	(Germany) Paul Hochberger	7–9, L
	Porsche 718 Cayman GT4 RS Clubsport	80	(Germany) Marco Reinbold	7–9, L
	Porsche 718 Cayman GT4 RS Clubsport	80	(Germany) Tom Nittel	7–8
(Germany) tm-racing.org	Porsche 718 Cayman GT4 RS Clubsport	81	(Germany) Fabio Sacchi	2–5, 7, 9
(Germany) tm-racing.org	Porsche 718 Cayman GT4 RS Clubsport	81	(Germany) Benedikt Höpfer	2–3, 6, 9
(Germany) tm-racing.org	Porsche 718 Cayman GT4 RS Clubsport	81	(Germany) Reiner Neuffer	3–7, 9–10
(Germany) tm-racing.org	Porsche 718 Cayman GT4 RS Clubsport	81	(Germany) Sebastian Brandl	5
(Germany) tm-racing.org	Porsche 718 Cayman GT4 RS Clubsport	81	(Germany) Alexander Kroker	6
(Germany) tm-racing.org	Porsche 718 Cayman GT4 RS Clubsport	81	(Germany) Christian Knötschke	7
(Germany) tm-racing.org	Porsche 718 Cayman GT4 RS Clubsport	81	(Germany) Marco Vitonelli	10
	Porsche 718 Cayman GT4 RS Clubsport	88	(Germany) Maik Rönnefarth	L
	Porsche 718 Cayman GT4 RS Clubsport	88	(Germany) Achim Wawer	L
	Porsche 718 Cayman GT4 RS Clubsport	88	(Germany) Volker Wawer	L
(Germany) Lionspeed GP	Porsche 718 Cayman GT4 RS Clubsport	89	(United Kingdom) Chris Lulham	7
(Germany) Lionspeed GP	Porsche 718 Cayman GT4 RS Clubsport	89	(Netherlands) Max Verstappen	7
(Germany) PROsport-Racing	Porsche 981 Cayman Pro4	95	(Germany) Marek Böckmann	10
(Germany) PROsport-Racing	Porsche 981 Cayman Pro4	95	(Austria) Raphael Rennhofer	10
(Germany) PROsport-Racing	Porsche 981 Cayman Pro4	95	(Germany) Hugo Sasse	10
	Porsche 997 GT3 Cup	97	(Germany) Valentin Lachenmayer	2, 4–5
	Porsche 997 GT3 Cup	97	(Germany) Julian Reeh	2, 4–5
	Porsche 997 GT3 Cup	97	(Germany) Ralf Schall	2
	Porsche 997 GT3 Cup	97	(Germany) Mark Trompeter	4–5
(Germany) W&S Motorsport	Porsche 718 Cayman GT4 RS Clubsport	164	(Germany) Stephan Brodmerkel	10
(Germany) W&S Motorsport	Porsche 718 Cayman GT4 RS Clubsport	164	(Austria) Constantin Schöll	10
(Germany) W&S Motorsport	Porsche 718 Cayman GT4 RS Clubsport	164	(Germany) Jürgen Vöhringer	10
(Germany) AVIA W&S Motorsport	Porsche 718 Cayman GT4 RS Clubsport	165	(United Kingdom) Toby Goodman	10
(Germany) AVIA W&S Motorsport	Porsche 718 Cayman GT4 RS Clubsport	165	(Finland) Philip Miemois	10
(Germany) AVIA W&S Motorsport	Porsche 718 Cayman GT4 RS Clubsport	165	(Germany) Moritz Oberheim	10
(Germany) KKrämer Racing	Porsche 992 GT3 Cup	909	(Germany) Lukas Ertl	4–5
(Germany) KKrämer Racing	Porsche 992 GT3 Cup	909	(Germany) Maximilian Ertl	4–5
(Germany) KKrämer Racing	Porsche 992 GT3 Cup	909	(Germany) Stefan Ertl	4–5
SP6
(Switzerland) Hofor Racing	BMW M3 E46 GTR	605	(Switzerland) Michael Kroll	10
(Switzerland) Hofor Racing	BMW M3 E46 GTR	605	(Germany) Bernd Kuepper	10
(Switzerland) Hofor Racing	BMW M3 E46 GTR	605	(Germany) Thomas Mühlenz	10
(Switzerland) Hofor Racing	BMW M3 E46 GTR	605	(Germany) Lars Jürgen Zander	10
SP5
SP4T
(Germany) White Angel for Fly and Help	Volkswagen New Beetle RSR	13	(Germany) Bernd Albrecht	4–5
(Germany) White Angel for Fly and Help	Volkswagen New Beetle RSR	13	(Germany) Carsten Knechtges	4–5
(Germany) White Angel for Fly and Help	Volkswagen New Beetle RSR	13	(Germany) Axel Duffner	4–5
(Germany) White Angel for Fly and Help	Volkswagen New Beetle RSR	13	(Germany) Oliver Bliss	4–5
(Japan) Subaru Tecnica International	Subaru WRX STI GT N24	88	(Japan) Rintaro Kubo	4–5
(Japan) Subaru Tecnica International	Subaru WRX STI GT N24	88	(Germany) Tim Schrick	4–5
	Porsche 718 Cayman	263	(Belgium) Jacques Derenne	3, 6
	Porsche 718 Cayman	263	(Italy) Bruno Barbaro	3
	Porsche 718 Cayman	263	(France) Fabrice Reicher	3
	Porsche 718 Cayman	263	(Germany) Harald Rettich	6
SP4
(Singapore) Giti Tire Motorsport by WS Racing	BMW 325i	252	(Germany) Bernd Kuepper	1
(Singapore) Giti Tire Motorsport by WS Racing	BMW 325i	252	(Germany) Kevin Küpper	1
(Singapore) Giti Tire Motorsport by WS Racing	BMW 325i	252	(Germany) Matthias Möller	1
(Germany) Oepen Motors Automobilsport	BMW 346C	254	(Germany) Henrik Lauenhardt	1, 3, 6–7, L
(Germany) Oepen Motors Automobilsport	BMW 346C	254	(Germany) Ingo Oepen	1–3
(Germany) Oepen Motors Automobilsport	BMW 346C	254	(Germany) Christian Koger	2, 6–7
(Germany) Oepen Motors Automobilsport	BMW 346C	254	(Germany) Thorsten Köppert	2, 6, L
(Germany) Oepen Motors Automobilsport	BMW 346C	254	(Germany) Ralph Hengesbach	7, L
(Germany) Oepen Motors Automobilsport	BMW 346C	254	(Germany) Katharina Lippka	6
SP3T
(Germany) Ollis Garage Racing	Dacia Logan	300	(Germany) Oliver Kriese	1–5
(Germany) Ollis Garage Racing	Dacia Logan	300	(Germany) Gregor Starck	3–5
(South Korea) Hyundai Motorsport N	Hyundai Elantra N Cup	303; 832	(South Korea) Kim Youngchan	2, 4–5
(South Korea) Hyundai Motorsport N	Hyundai Elantra N Cup	303; 832	(Germany) Manuel Lauck	2
(South Korea) Hyundai Motorsport N	Hyundai Elantra N Cup	303; 832	(China) Zhang Zhendong	4–5
(South Korea) Hyundai Motorsport N	Hyundai Elantra N Cup	303; 832	(United States) Jeff Ricca	4–5
(South Korea) Hyundai Motorsport N	Hyundai Elantra N Cup	303; 832	(South Korea) Kim Gyumin	4–5
	Cupra León TCR	308	(Germany) Jens Wulf	3, 10
	Cupra León TCR	308	(Germany) Dennis Leißing	3
	Cupra León TCR	308	(Germany) Philip Schauerte	3
	Cupra León TCR	308	(Netherlands) Filip Hoenjet	10
(Germany) FK Performance Motorsport	BMW M2 Racing (G87)	310	(Germany) Michael Bräutigam	4–5
(Germany) FK Performance Motorsport	BMW M2 Racing (G87)	310	(Belgium) Charles Weerts	4–5
(Germany) FK Performance Motorsport	BMW M2 Racing (G87)	310	(Belgium) Ugo de Wilde	4–5
(Germany) MSC Sinzig e.V. im ADAC	Audi TT	311	(Germany) Rudi Speich	3, 10, L
(Germany) MSC Sinzig e.V. im ADAC	Audi TT	311	(Germany) Roland Waschkau	3, 10, L
(Germany) MSC Sinzig e.V. im ADAC	Audi TT	311	(Germany) Daniel Jenichen	10
(Germany) Schmickler Performance powered by Ravenol	Porsche 982 Turbo	312	(Germany) Maik Rönnefarth	1–3, 6, 9–10
(Germany) Schmickler Performance powered by Ravenol	Porsche 982 Turbo	312	(Germany) Achim Wawer	1–3, 6, 9–10
(Germany) Schmickler Performance powered by Ravenol	Porsche 982 Turbo	312	(Germany) Claudius Karch	1–3
(Germany) Schmickler Performance powered by Ravenol	Porsche 982 Turbo	312	(Germany) Carsten Knechtges	6, 9–10
(Armenia) Goroyan RT by sharky-racing	Volkswagen Golf TCR - SR	313	(Netherlands) Filip Hoenjet	2–3
(Armenia) Goroyan RT by sharky-racing	Volkswagen Golf TCR - SR	313	(Germany) Moritz Rosenbach	2
(Armenia) Goroyan RT by sharky-racing	Volkswagen Golf TCR - SR	313	(Germany) Sarah Ganser	3
(Armenia) Goroyan RT by sharky-racing	Cupra León TCR	314	(Kyrgyzstan) Oleg Kvitka	2–3
(Armenia) Goroyan RT by sharky-racing	Cupra León TCR	314	(Germany) Patrick Steinmetz	2
(Armenia) Goroyan RT by sharky-racing	Cupra León TCR	314	(Germany) Philipp Eis	3
(Armenia) Goroyan RT by sharky-racing	Cupra León TCR	314	(Germany) René Steiger	3
(Armenia) Goroyan RT by sharky-racing	Audi RS 3 LMS TCR (2017)	321	(Germany) Constantin Ernst	1
(Armenia) Goroyan RT by sharky-racing	Audi RS 3 LMS TCR (2017)	321	(Netherlands) Filip Hoenjet	1
(Armenia) Goroyan RT by sharky-racing	Audi RS 3 LMS TCR (2017)	321	(Germany) Patrick Steinmetz	1
(Armenia) Goroyan RT by sharky-racing	Audi RS 3 LMS TCR (2017)	321	(Latvia) Ivars Vallers	7–9
(Armenia) Goroyan RT by sharky-racing	Audi RS 3 LMS TCR (2017)	321	(Sweden) Mikaela Åhlin-Kottulinsky	7–8
(Armenia) Goroyan RT by sharky-racing	Audi RS 3 LMS TCR (2017)	321	(Luxembourg) Gabriel Rindone	8
(Armenia) Goroyan RT by sharky-racing	Audi RS 3 LMS TCR (2017)	321	(Germany) Moritz Rosenbach	9
(Armenia) Goroyan RT by sharky-racing	Audi RS 3 LMS TCR (2017)	321	(Germany) Jens Wulf	9
(Armenia) Goroyan RT by sharky-racing	Audi RS 3 LMS TCR (2017)	321	(Germany) Dr. Stefan Lohn	L
(Armenia) Goroyan RT by sharky-racing	Audi RS 3 LMS TCR (2017)	321	(Germany) Sascha Siegert	L
(Armenia) Goroyan RT by sharky-racing	Audi RS 3 LMS TCR (2017)	321	(Germany) René Steiger	L
(Germany) Max Kruse Racing	Audi RS 3 LMS TCR (2017)	323	(Switzerland) Armando Stanco	1, 4–6, 9
(Germany) Max Kruse Racing	Audi RS 3 LMS TCR (2017)	323	(Switzerland) Dario Stanco	1, 4–6, 9
	Mitsubishi Lancer CT9A	324	(Germany) Mario Fuchs	L
	Mitsubishi Lancer CT9A	324	(Germany) Eugen Weber	L
(Germany) asBest Racing	Cupra León TCR	808	(Germany) Jens Wulf	1–2
(Germany) asBest Racing	Cupra León TCR	808	(Germany) Kim Berwanger	1
(Germany) asBest Racing	Cupra León TCR	808	(Germany) Dennis Leißing	1
(Germany) asBest Racing	Cupra León TCR	808	(Germany) Hans Joachim Rabe	2
SP3
(Germany) MSC Adenau e.V. im ADAC	Renault Clio III Cup	270	(Germany) Stephan Epp	L
(Germany) MSC Adenau e.V. im ADAC	Renault Clio III Cup	270	(Germany) Timo Kaatz	L
(Germany) MSC Adenau e.V. im ADAC	Renault Clio III Cup	270	(Germany) Michael Uelwer	L
(Germany) Ravenol Motorsport	BMW 318ti Cup	275	(Germany) Marc David Müller	2–5
(Germany) Ravenol Motorsport	BMW 318ti Cup	275	(Germany) Markus Rupp	2–3
(Germany) Ravenol Motorsport	BMW 318ti Cup	275	(Germany) Mika König	4–5
(Germany) Ravenol Motorsport	BMW 318ti Cup	275	(Germany) Henrik Seibel	7–8
(Germany) Ravenol Motorsport	BMW 318ti Cup	275	(Germany) Christopher Groth	7–8
(Germany) Ravenol Motorsport	BMW 318ti EVO2	277	(Germany) Marc David Müller	7–8
(Germany) Ravenol Motorsport	BMW 318ti EVO2	277	(Germany) Markus Rupp	7–8
	Renault Clio III RS Cup	281	(Germany) Holger Goedicke	L
	Renault Clio III RS Cup	281	(Germany) Lukas Krämer	L
	Toyota GT86	288	(Germany) Achim	6
	Toyota GT86	288	(Romania) Theodor Devolescu	6
	Toyota GT86	288	(Germany) Benjamin Zerfeld	6
SP2T
(Japan) TOYOTA GAZOO ROOKIE Racing	Toyota GR Yaris	109	(Japan) Hiroaki Ishiura	2
(Japan) TOYOTA GAZOO ROOKIE Racing	Toyota GR Yaris	109	(Japan) Morizo	2
(Japan) TOYOTA GAZOO ROOKIE Racing	Toyota GR Yaris	109	(Japan) Kazuya Oshima	2
(Japan) TOYOTA GAZOO ROOKIE Racing	Toyota GR Yaris	109	(Japan) Daisuke Toyoda	2
(Japan) TOYOTA GAZOO ROOKIE Racing	Toyota GR Yaris	382	(Japan) Hiroaki Ishiura	2
(Japan) TOYOTA GAZOO ROOKIE Racing	Toyota GR Yaris	382	(Japan) Morizo	2
(Japan) TOYOTA GAZOO ROOKIE Racing	Toyota GR Yaris	382	(Japan) Kazuya Oshima	2
(Japan) TOYOTA GAZOO ROOKIE Racing	Toyota GR Yaris	382	(Japan) Daisuke Toyoda	2
	Renault Clio X98 Cup	381	(Belgium) Dimitri Persoons	2
	Renault Clio X98 Cup	381	(Belgium) Axel Soyez	2
Entry Lists:

==== AT(-G) ====
Team	Car	No.	Drivers	Rounds
AT 1
(Germany) Max Kruse Racing	Audi R8 LMS GT3 Evo II	22	(Germany) Dominik Fugel	9–10
(Germany) Max Kruse Racing	Audi R8 LMS GT3 Evo II	22	(Germany) Marcel Fugel	9–10
(Germany) Max Kruse Racing	Audi R8 LMS GT3 Evo II	22	(Germany) Benjamin Leuchter	9–10
AT 2
(Germany) Four Motors Bioconcept-Car	Porsche 992 GT3 Cup	320	(Germany) Tom	2, 7
(Germany) Four Motors Bioconcept-Car	Porsche 992 GT3 Cup	320	(Germany) Michelle Halder	2
(Germany) Four Motors Bioconcept-Car	Porsche 992 GT3 Cup	320	(Netherlands) Marco van Ramshorst	2
(Germany) Four Motors Bioconcept-Car	Porsche 992 GT3 Cup	320	(Germany) Luka Wlömer	2
(Germany) Four Motors Bioconcept-Car	Porsche 992 GT3 Cup	320	(Switzerland) Marc Schöni	7
(Germany) Four Motors Bioconcept-Car	Porsche 992 GT3 Cup	320	(Germany) Smudo	7
(Germany) Max Kruse Racing	Porsche 992 GT3 Cup	644	(Germany) Dominik Fugel	1–3
(Germany) Max Kruse Racing	Porsche 992 GT3 Cup	644	(Germany) Marcel Fugel	1–3
(Germany) Max Kruse Racing	Porsche 992 GT3 Cup	644	(Germany) Benjamin Leuchter	1
(Germany) Max Kruse Racing	Porsche 992 GT3 Cup	644	(Germany) Moritz Oestreich	2–3
(Germany) Manthey Racing	Porsche 718 Cayman GT4 RS CS M	718	(Germany) Björn Griesemann	2–5, 7–8
(Germany) Manthey Racing	Porsche 718 Cayman GT4 RS CS M	718	(Germany) Georg Griesemann	2–5, 7–8
(Germany) Manthey Racing	Porsche 718 Cayman GT4 RS CS M	718	(Germany) Dirk Adorf	4–5
(Germany) Manthey Racing	Porsche 718 Cayman GT4 RS CS M	718	(Germany) Yves Volte	4–5
(Germany) Manthey Racing	Porsche 718 Cayman GT4 RS CS M	718	(Germany) Marco Holzer	7–8
AT 3
(Germany) Max Kruse Racing	Audi RS 3 LMS TCR (2021)	10	(Germany) Timo Hochwind	1–3, 6–10
(Germany) Max Kruse Racing	Audi RS 3 LMS TCR (2021)	10	(Germany) Heiko Hammel	1
(Germany) Max Kruse Racing	Audi RS 3 LMS TCR (2021)	10	(Germany) Nicholas Otto	2, 10
(Germany) Max Kruse Racing	Audi RS 3 LMS TCR (2021)	10	(France) Benjamin Cartery	2
(Germany) Max Kruse Racing	Audi RS 3 LMS TCR (2021)	10	(Germany) Benjamin Leuchter	3
(Germany) Max Kruse Racing	Audi RS 3 LMS TCR (2021)	10	(Germany) Max Kruse	10
(Germany) Max Kruse Racing	Audi RS 3 LMS TCR (2021)	10	(Switzerland) Christoph Lenz	6–9
(Germany) Max Kruse Racing	Audi RS 3 LMS TCR (2021)	10	(Switzerland) Jasmin Preisig	6–9
(Germany) Max Kruse Racing	Audi RS 3 LMS TCR (2021)	333	(Denmark) Kristian Jepsen	1
(Germany) Max Kruse Racing	Audi RS 3 LMS TCR (2021)	333	(Denmark) Jan Bisgaard Sörensen	1
(Germany) Max Kruse Racing	Audi RS 3 LMS TCR (2021)	333	(Switzerland) Christoph Lenz	7–8, L
(Germany) Max Kruse Racing	Audi RS 3 LMS TCR (2021)	333	(Germany) Marcus Menden	7–8
(Germany) Max Kruse Racing	Audi RS 3 LMS TCR (2021)	333	(Germany) Nicholas Otto	7–8
(Germany) Max Kruse Racing	Audi RS 3 LMS TCR (2021)	333	(United States) Christopher Allen	9
(Germany) Max Kruse Racing	Audi RS 3 LMS TCR (2021)	333	(United States) Andrew Engelmann	9
(Germany) Max Kruse Racing	Audi RS 3 LMS TCR (2021)	333	(United States) Robert Mau	9
(Germany) Max Kruse Racing	Audi RS 3 LMS TCR (2021)	333	(Switzerland) Jasmin Preisig	L
(Germany) Max Kruse Racing	Volkswagen Golf GTI TCR	33	(Germany) Max Kruse	2, 9
(Germany) Max Kruse Racing	Volkswagen Golf GTI TCR	33	(United States) Andrew Engelmann	2
(Germany) Max Kruse Racing	Volkswagen Golf GTI TCR	33	(Switzerland) Jasmin Preisig	2
(Germany) Max Kruse Racing	Volkswagen Golf GTI TCR	33	(Germany) Nicholas Otto	9
(Germany) Max Kruse Racing	Volkswagen Golf GTI TCR	819	(Switzerland) Christoph Lenz	1–3
(Germany) Max Kruse Racing	Volkswagen Golf GTI TCR	819	(Netherlands) Rudy van Buren	1–2
(Germany) Max Kruse Racing	Volkswagen Golf GTI TCR	819	(Germany) Max Kruse	1, 3
(Germany) Max Kruse Racing	Volkswagen Golf GTI TCR	819	(United States) Christopher Allen	2
(Germany) Max Kruse Racing	Volkswagen Golf GTI TCR	819	(Switzerland) Dario Stanco	3
(Germany) Max Kruse Racing	Volkswagen Golf GTI Clubsport 24h	19	(Germany) Heiko Hammel	L
(Germany) Max Kruse Racing	Volkswagen Golf GTI Clubsport 24h	19	(Germany) Benjamin Leuchter	L
(Germany) Max Kruse Racing	Volkswagen Golf GTI Clubsport 24h	76	(Germany) Christian Gebhardt	1–2
(Germany) Max Kruse Racing	Volkswagen Golf GTI Clubsport 24h	76	(Germany) Fabian Vettel	1–2
(Germany) Max Kruse Racing	Volkswagen Golf GTI Clubsport 24h	76	(Sweden) Johan Kristoffersson	1
(Germany) Max Kruse Racing	Volkswagen Golf GTI Clubsport 24h	76	(Germany) Heiko Hammel	2
(Germany) Max Kruse Racing	Volkswagen Golf GTI Clubsport 24h	76	(Germany) Nicholas Otto	3, L
(Germany) Max Kruse Racing	Volkswagen Golf GTI Clubsport 24h	76	(Germany) Benjamin Leuchter	3
(Germany) Max Kruse Racing	Volkswagen Golf GTI Clubsport 24h	76	(Switzerland) Jasmin Preisig	3
(Germany) Max Kruse Racing	Volkswagen Golf GTI Clubsport 24h	76	(Germany) Timo Hochwind	L
(Singapore) Giti Tire Motorsport by WS Racing	BMW M4 GT4 Gen II	146	(Latvia) Patricija Stalidzane	4–5
(Singapore) Giti Tire Motorsport by WS Racing	BMW M4 GT4 Gen II	146	(Germany) Janina Schall	4–5
(Singapore) Giti Tire Motorsport by WS Racing	BMW M4 GT4 Gen II	146	(Netherlands) Beitske Visser	4–5
(Singapore) Giti Tire Motorsport by WS Racing	BMW M4 GT4 Gen II	146	(Liechtenstein) Fabienne Wohlwend	4–5
(Singapore) Giti Tire Motorsport by WS Racing	BMW M4 GT4 Gen II	146	(Germany) Carrie Schreiner	6
(Germany) Four Motors Bionconcept-Car	Porsche 718 Cayman GT4 Clubsport	420	(Germany) Oliver Sprungman	2, 7, 10
(Germany) Four Motors Bionconcept-Car	Porsche 718 Cayman GT4 Clubsport	420	(Germany) Henning Cramer	2, 10
(Germany) Four Motors Bionconcept-Car	Porsche 718 Cayman GT4 Clubsport	420	(Switzerland) Marc Schöni	2, 10
(Germany) Four Motors Bionconcept-Car	Porsche 718 Cayman GT4 Clubsport	420	(Germany) Christoph Hewer	2
(Germany) Four Motors Bionconcept-Car	Porsche 718 Cayman GT4 Clubsport	420	(Denmark) Michelle Gatting	6
(Germany) Four Motors Bionconcept-Car	Porsche 718 Cayman GT4 Clubsport	420	(France) Alessandro Ghiretti	6
(Germany) Four Motors Bionconcept-Car	Porsche 718 Cayman GT4 Clubsport	420	(Netherlands) Robert de Haan	6
(Germany) Four Motors Bionconcept-Car	Porsche 718 Cayman GT4 Clubsport	420	(Germany) Montana	7
(Germany) Four Motors Bionconcept-Car	Porsche 718 Cayman GT4 Clubsport	633	(Denmark) Michelle Gatting	2
(Germany) Four Motors Bionconcept-Car	Porsche 718 Cayman GT4 Clubsport	633	(France) Alessandro Ghiretti	2
(Germany) Four Motors Bionconcept-Car	Porsche 718 Cayman GT4 Clubsport	633	(Netherlands) Robert de Haan	2
(Germany) Four Motors Bionconcept-Car	Porsche 718 Cayman GT4 Clubsport	633	(United States) David Ogburn	7–8
(Germany) Four Motors Bionconcept-Car	Porsche 718 Cayman GT4 Clubsport	633	(United States) Charles Turner	7–8
(China) Fancy Motorsport	Lynk & Co 03 TCR	827	(China) Yan Chuang	4–5
(China) Fancy Motorsport	Lynk & Co 03 TCR	827	(Hong Kong) Sunny Wong	4–5
(China) Fancy Motorsport	Lynk & Co 03 TCR	827	(China) Ma Qinghua	4–5
Entry Lists:

==== TCR ====
Team	Car	No.	Drivers	Rounds
(Armenia) Goroyan RT by sharky-racing	Audi RS 3 LMS TCR (2021)	777	(Germany) Danny Brink	1–10, L
(Armenia) Goroyan RT by sharky-racing	Audi RS 3 LMS TCR (2021)	777	(Armenia) Artur Goroyan	1–10
(Armenia) Goroyan RT by sharky-racing	Audi RS 3 LMS TCR (2021)	777	(Armenia) Roman Mavlanov	1, 3–6, 9–10, L
(Armenia) Goroyan RT by sharky-racing	Audi RS 3 LMS TCR (2021)	777	(France) Nathanaël Berthon	1
(Armenia) Goroyan RT by sharky-racing	Audi RS 3 LMS TCR (2021)	777	(Kyrgyzstan) Oleg Kvitka	4–10, L
(Estonia) ALM Motorsport	Honda Civic Type R TCR (FL5)	800	(Germany) Mike Halder	9
(Estonia) ALM Motorsport	Honda Civic Type R TCR (FL5)	800	(Portugal) Tiago Monteiro	9
(Norway) Møller Bil Motorsport	Audi RS 3 LMS TCR (2021)	801	(Norway) Kenneth Østvold	2–3, 7, 9–10
(Norway) Møller Bil Motorsport	Audi RS 3 LMS TCR (2021)	801	(Norway) Håkon Schjærin	2–3, 10
(Norway) Møller Bil Motorsport	Audi RS 3 LMS TCR (2021)	801	(Norway) Atle Gulbrandsen	2, 7
(Norway) Møller Bil Motorsport	Audi RS 3 LMS TCR (2021)	801	(Norway) Anders Lindstad	3, 7, 9–10
(Germany) asBest Racing	Cupra León TCR	808	(Germany) Jens Wulf	2–3, 6–7, L
(Germany) asBest Racing	Cupra León TCR	808	(Germany) Hans-Joachim Rabe	2–3
(Germany) asBest Racing	Cupra León TCR	808	(Germany) Dennis Leißing	3–5
(Germany) asBest Racing	Cupra León TCR	808	(Germany) Lutz Obermann	4–5
(Germany) asBest Racing	Cupra León TCR	808	(Japan) Junichi Umemoto	4–5
(Germany) asBest Racing	Cupra León TCR	808	(Germany) Meik Utsch	6–7
(Germany) asBest Racing	Cupra León TCR	808	(Germany) Sebastian Schemmann	6
(Germany) asBest Racing	Cupra León TCR	808	(Germany) Henrik Seibel	6
(Germany) asBest Racing	Cupra León TCR	808	(Sweden) Thomas Grunert	L
(Germany) asBest Racing	Cupra León TCR	808	(Germany) Sebastian Steibel	L
(South Korea) Hyundai Motorsport N	Hyundai Elantra N TCR (2024)	830	(Germany) Manuel Lauck	4–5
(South Korea) Hyundai Motorsport N	Hyundai Elantra N TCR (2024)	830	(Germany) Marc Basseng	4–5
(South Korea) Hyundai Motorsport N	Hyundai Elantra N TCR (2024)	830	(Spain) Mikel Azcona	4–5
(South Korea) Hyundai Motorsport N	Hyundai Elantra N TCR (2024)	830	(Germany) Christer Jöns	4–5
(South Korea) Hyundai Motorsport N	Hyundai Elantra N TCR (2024)	831	(United States) Michael Lewis	2, 4–5
(South Korea) Hyundai Motorsport N	Hyundai Elantra N TCR (2024)	831	(Canada) Robert Wickens	2, 4–5
(South Korea) Hyundai Motorsport N	Hyundai Elantra N TCR (2024)	831	(South Korea) Kim Youngchan	2
(South Korea) Hyundai Motorsport N	Hyundai Elantra N TCR (2024)	831	(United States) Mason Filippi	4–5
(South Korea) Hyundai Motorsport N	Hyundai Elantra N TCR (2024)	831	(United States) Bryson Morris	4–5
Entry Lists:

==== NLS production cars ====
Team	Car	No.	Drivers	Rounds
V6
(Germany) Adrenalin Motorsport Team Mainhattan Wheels	Porsche Cayman S	396	(Germany) Christian Büllesbach	1–10
(Germany) Adrenalin Motorsport Team Mainhattan Wheels	Porsche Cayman S	396	(Germany) Klaus Faßbender	1–10
(Germany) Adrenalin Motorsport Team Mainhattan Wheels	Porsche Cayman S	396	(Germany) Andreas Schettler	1–10
(Germany) Adrenalin Motorsport Team Mainhattan Wheels	Porsche Cayman S	396	(Germany) Daniel Zils	1–10
(Germany) Schmickler Performance powered by Ravenol	Porsche 911 Carrera	400	(Germany) Christian Heuchemer	2–3, 6, 9–10, L
(Germany) Schmickler Performance powered by Ravenol	Porsche 911 Carrera	400	(Germany) Thomas Heuchemer	2–3, 6, 9–10, L
(Germany) Schmickler Performance powered by Ravenol	Porsche 911 Carrera	400	(Germany) Sascha Kloft	6, 9
(Germany) KKrämer Racing	Porsche Cayman S	409	(Germany) John Finken	3
(Germany) KKrämer Racing	Porsche Cayman S	409	(United States) Kyle Tilley	3
(Germany) rent2Drive-racing	Porsche Cayman GTS	410	(Switzerland) David Ackermann	1–5, 7–10, L
(Germany) rent2Drive-racing	Porsche Cayman GTS	410	(Germany) Laurents Hörr	1, 3
(Germany) rent2Drive-racing	Porsche Cayman GTS	410	(Germany) Daniel Nölken	1, 3
(Germany) rent2Drive-racing	Porsche Cayman GTS	410	(United Kingdom) Scott Marshall	2, 4–5
(Germany) rent2Drive-racing	Porsche Cayman GTS	410	(Germany) Marcel Weber	2, L
(Germany) rent2Drive-racing	Porsche Cayman GTS	410	(Italy) Stefano Croci	4–5, 10
(Germany) rent2Drive-racing	Porsche Cayman GTS	410	(Germany) Stefan Müller	4–5, 10
(Germany) rent2Drive-racing	Porsche Cayman GTS	410	(France) Jérôme Larbi	7–9
(Germany) rent2Drive-racing	Porsche Cayman GTS	410	(France) Joël Le Bihan	7–8
(Germany) rent2Drive-racing	Porsche Cayman GTS	410	(Germany) Richard Schäfer	9, L
(Germany) rent2Drive-racing	Porsche Cayman GTS	410	(Germany) Alexander Weber	10
	Porsche 911	414	(Germany) Sebastian Rings	3–6, L
	Porsche 911	414	(Germany) Andreas Schaflitzl	3–6
	Porsche 911	414	(Germany) Alexander Köppen	3–5, L
	Porsche 911	414	(Poland) Jacek Pydys	4–5
	Porsche 911	414	(Germany) Bastian Arend	6, L
	Porsche 911	415	(Germany) Alexander Köppen	10
	Porsche 911	415	(Germany) Sebastian Rings	10
	Porsche 911	417	(Germany) Dirk Freimuth	L
	Porsche 911	417	(Germany) Christian Linnek	L
V5
(Germany) QTQ Raceperformance	Porsche Cayman CM12	440	(Germany) Mirco Böhmisch	1–3, 7–8
(Germany) QTQ Raceperformance	Porsche Cayman CM12	440	(Germany) Florian Ebener	1–3, 7–10
(Germany) QTQ Raceperformance	Porsche Cayman CM12	440	(Germany) Andreas Müller	1–2
(Germany) QTQ Raceperformance	Porsche Cayman CM12	440	(Germany) Bernd Kleeschulte	1
(Germany) QTQ Raceperformance	Porsche Cayman CM12	440	(Germany) Florian Kramer	2, 7–8
(Germany) QTQ Raceperformance	Porsche Cayman CM12	440	(Germany) Philip Schauerte	9–10
(Germany) QTQ Raceperformance	Porsche Cayman CM12	440	(Switzerland) Alain Valente	9
(Germany) QTQ Raceperformance	Porsche Cayman CM12	440	(Germany) Fritz Hebig	10
(Germany) Adrenalin Motorsport Team Mainhattan Wheels	Porsche Cayman CM12	444	(Germany) Daniel Korn	1–10, L
(Germany) Adrenalin Motorsport Team Mainhattan Wheels	Porsche Cayman CM12	444	(Germany) Tobias Korn	1–10, L
(Germany) Adrenalin Motorsport Team Mainhattan Wheels	Porsche Cayman CM12	444	(Germany) Ulrich Korn	1–10, L
(Germany) Adrenalin Motorsport Team Mainhattan Wheels	Porsche Cayman CM12	444	(Hungary) Adam Benko	4–5
(Germany) Adrenalin Motorsport Team Mainhattan Wheels	Porsche Cayman CM12	444	(Germany) Julius Thommel	L
(Germany) Taxi-Arbinger-Racing by rent2Drive	Porsche Cayman CM12	445	(Germany) Georg Arbinger	1–5, L
(Germany) Taxi-Arbinger-Racing by rent2Drive	Porsche Cayman CM12	445	(France) Jérôme Larbi	1–5, L
(Germany) Taxi-Arbinger-Racing by rent2Drive	Porsche Cayman CM12	445	(Germany) Holger Gachot	2, L
(Germany) Taxi-Arbinger-Racing by rent2Drive	Porsche Cayman CM12	445	(France) Joël Le Bihan	4–5
(Germany) Taxi-Arbinger-Racing by rent2Drive	Porsche Cayman CM12	445	(Germany) Jan Ullrich	4
(Germany) Taxi-Arbinger-Racing by rent2Drive	Porsche Cayman CM12	445	(United Kingdom) Scott Marshall	1
(Germany) tm-racing.org	Porsche Cayman CM12	447	(Germany) Alexander Müller	2, 6, 9–10
(Germany) tm-racing.org	Porsche Cayman CM12	447	(Germany) Christian Weber	2, 6, 9–10
(Germany) tm-racing.org	Porsche Cayman CM12	447	(Germany) Reiner Neuffer	2
(Germany) tm-racing.org	Porsche Cayman CM12	447	(Germany) Jan Weber	6, 9–10
(Germany) tm-racing.org	Porsche Cayman CM12	447	(Germany) Quick Vic	6
(Germany) tm-racing.org	Porsche Cayman CM12	447	(Germany) Torsten Krey	9
(Germany) tm-racing.org	Porsche Cayman CM12	448	(Germany) Reiner Neuffer	1
(Germany) tm-racing.org	Porsche Cayman CM12	448	(China) Duan Jinyu	2–3
(Germany) tm-racing.org	Porsche Cayman CM12	448	(China) Lu Chao	2–3
(Germany) tm-racing.org	Porsche Cayman CM12	448	(China) Ke Shao	2–3
(Germany) tm-racing.org	Porsche Cayman CM12	448	(Germany) Norman Oehlschläger	9, L
(Germany) tm-racing.org	Porsche Cayman CM12	448	(Germany) Jan Hendrik Heimbach	9
(Germany) tm-racing.org	Porsche Cayman CM12	448	(Germany) Marco Vitonelli	9
(Germany) tm-racing.org	Porsche Cayman CM12	448	(Germany) Benedikt Höpfer	L
(Germany) tm-racing.org	Porsche Cayman CM12	448	(Germany) Michael Schröder	L
	Porsche Cayman CM12	452	(Germany) Rudolf Brandl	L
	Porsche Cayman CM12	452	(Germany) Fabio Sacchi	L
	Porsche Cayman CM12	452	(Germany) Marcus Thierbach	L
	Porsche Cayman CM12	455	(Netherlands) Filip Hoenjet	4–5
	Porsche Cayman CM12	455	(United Kingdom) Jann Mardenborough	4–5
	Porsche Cayman CM12	455	(Germany) Sarah Ganser	4
	Porsche Cayman CM12	456	(Germany) Levi O'Dey	2, 7–10
	Porsche Cayman CM12	456	(Germany) Jochen Krumbach	2, 7–8
	Porsche Cayman CM12	456	(Germany) Marvin Schiede	7–10
V4
	BMW 325i	730	(Germany) Tim Beermann	10, L
	BMW 325i	730	(Germany) Daniel Syrzisko	10, L
	BMW 325i	730	(Germany) Mark Monhof	L
	BMW 325i	731	(Germany) Manfred Schmitz	2
	BMW 325i	731	(Germany) Reiner Thomas	2
VT3
(Germany) Keevin Sports and Racing	BMW 335i G20	460	(Brazil) Flavia Pellegrino Fernandes	1–3, 6
(Germany) Keevin Sports and Racing	BMW 335i G20	460	(Germany) Marco Schmitz	1–3
(Germany) Keevin Sports and Racing	BMW 335i G20	460	(Germany) Mark Trompeter	1–3
(Germany) Keevin Sports and Racing	BMW 335i G20	460	(Germany) Jörg Schönfelder	6–9, L
(Germany) Keevin Sports and Racing	BMW 335i G20	460	(Germany) Matthias Aretz	6–8, L
(Germany) Keevin Sports and Racing	BMW 335i G20	460	(Germany) Serge van Vooren	6–8
(Germany) Keevin Sports and Racing	BMW 335i G20	460	(Germany) Axel Duffner	9
(Germany) Keevin Sports and Racing	BMW 335i G20	460	(United Kingdom) Alex Wright	9
(Germany) Keevin Sports and Racing	BMW 335i G20	460	(Germany) Thomas Plum	L
	BMW M2	461	(Switzerland) Dominic Kulpowicz	L
	BMW M2	461	(Germany) Sebastian Tauber	L
V3
	BMW 318i	529	(Germany) Manfred Schmitz	6–9
	BMW 318i	529	(Germany) Katja Thomas	6–9
	BMW 318i	529	(Germany) Reiner Thomas	6–9
VT2-FWD+4WD
(Germany) Walkenhorst Motorsport	Hyundai i30N	466	(Canada) Josh Hansen	1–2
(Germany) Walkenhorst Motorsport	Hyundai i30N	466	(Switzerland) Fabio Scherer	1, 6
(Germany) Walkenhorst Motorsport	Hyundai i30N	466	(United States) Gino Manley	1
(Germany) Walkenhorst Motorsport	Hyundai i30N	466	(Sweden) Oliver Söderström	2–3
(Germany) Walkenhorst Motorsport	Hyundai i30N	466	(United Kingdom) Tom Edgar	2
(Germany) Walkenhorst Motorsport	Hyundai i30N	466	(Ecuador) Mateo Villagomez	3, 6, L
(Germany) Walkenhorst Motorsport	Hyundai i30N	466	(Norway) Emil Christian Gjerdrum	6, L
(Germany) Walkenhorst Motorsport	Hyundai i30N	466	(Australia) Lachlan Robinson	6
(Germany) Walkenhorst Motorsport	Hyundai i30N	466	(United States) Colin Queen	L
(Germany) Hyundai Driving Experience	Hyundai i30N	467	(Germany) Michael Bohrer	1–10
(Germany) Hyundai Driving Experience	Hyundai i30N	467	(Germany) Gerrit Holthaus	1–10
(Germany) Hyundai Driving Experience	Hyundai i30N	467	(Germany) Stephan Epp	6–10
(Germany) Auto Thomas by Jung Motorsport	Cupra Leon VZ	470	(Germany) Tobias Jung	1–10
(Germany) Auto Thomas by Jung Motorsport	Cupra Leon VZ	470	(Germany) Christoph Schmitz	1–10
(Germany) Auto Thomas by Jung Motorsport	Cupra Leon VZ	470	(Germany) Marcel Unland	1–10
(Germany) Auto Thomas by Jung Motorsport	Cupra Leon KL	471	(Germany) Michael Eichhorn	1, 4–8, 10
(Germany) Auto Thomas by Jung Motorsport	Cupra Leon KL	471	(Germany) Maximilian Simons	1, 7–10
(Germany) Auto Thomas by Jung Motorsport	Cupra Leon KL	471	(Germany) Andreas Winterwerber	4–5
(Germany) Auto Thomas by Jung Motorsport	Cupra Leon KL	471	(Germany) Markus Weinstock	6–8, 10
(Germany) Auto Thomas by Jung Motorsport	Cupra Leon KL	471	(Germany) Marcel Müller	6, 10
(Germany) Auto Thomas by Jung Motorsport	Cupra Leon KL	471	(Germany) Marc Etzkorn	9
(Germany) Auto Thomas by Jung Motorsport	Cupra Leon KL	471	(Germany) Lars Füting	9
(Germany) Auto Thomas by Jung Motorsport	Cupra Leon KL	472	(Germany) Lars Füting	1–6
(Germany) Auto Thomas by Jung Motorsport	Cupra Leon KL	472	(Germany) Tim Robertz	1–5
(Germany) Auto Thomas by Jung Motorsport	Cupra Leon KL	472	(Germany) Marc Etzkorn	1–2
(Germany) Auto Thomas by Jung Motorsport	Cupra Leon KL	472	(Germany) Achim Ewenz	1–2
(Germany) Auto Thomas by Jung Motorsport	Cupra Leon KL	472	(France) Francois Wales	3
(Germany) Auto Thomas by Jung Motorsport	Cupra Leon KL	472	(Germany) Maximilian Simons	4–6
(Germany) Auto Thomas by Jung Motorsport	Cupra Leon KL	472	(Netherlands) Chris Rothoff	4–5
(Germany) Auto Thomas by Jung Motorsport	Cupra Leon KL	472	(Germany) Daniel Jenichen	6
(Germany) Auto Thomas by Jung Motorsport	Cupra Leon KL	472	(Germany) Rudi Speich	6
	Volkswagen Golf VII	474	(Germany) Fritz Hebig	6
	Volkswagen Golf VII	474	(Switzerland) Boris Hrubesch	6
	Volkswagen Golf VII	474	(Denmark) Kaj Schubert	6
	Volkswagen Golf VII	474	(Germany) Fabian Tillmann	6
(Germany) asBest Racing	Volkswagen Scirocco	475	(Germany) Kevin Olaf Rost	3, L
(Germany) asBest Racing	Volkswagen Scirocco	475	(Germany) Olaf Rost	3, L
(Germany) asBest Racing	Volkswagen Scirocco	475	(Germany) Hans-Joachim Legermann	3
(Germany) asBest Racing	Volkswagen Scirocco	475	(Germany) Felix Schumann	L
(Germany) asBest Racing	Volkswagen Scirocco	477	(Germany) Christian Koger	1–5
(Germany) asBest Racing	Volkswagen Scirocco	477	(Germany) Florian Discher	1
(Germany) asBest Racing	Volkswagen Scirocco	477	(Germany) Henrik Seibel	1
(Germany) asBest Racing	Volkswagen Scirocco	477	(Germany) Lutz Obermann	2
(Germany) asBest Racing	Volkswagen Scirocco	477	(Germany) Roman Schiemenz	3
(Germany) asBest Racing	Volkswagen Scirocco	477	(Germany) Mark Trompeter	3
(Germany) asBest Racing	Volkswagen Scirocco	477	(Germany) Thomas Mennecke	4–5
(Germany) asBest Racing	Volkswagen Scirocco	477	(United States) Seth Brown	4–5
(Germany) asBest Racing	Volkswagen Scirocco	477	(Poland) Rafal Gieras	7–8
(Germany) asBest Racing	Volkswagen Scirocco	477	(Brazil) Flavia Pellegrino Fernandes	7–8
(Germany) asBest Racing	Volkswagen Scirocco	477	(Germany) David Vogt	7–8
(Germany) asBest Racing	Volkswagen Scirocco	477	(Germany) Bastian Beck	7
(Germany) Dupré Engineering	Audi RS3	480	(Germany) Christoph Dupré	1–10
(Germany) Dupré Engineering	Audi RS3	480	(Germany) Joachim Nett	1–10
(Germany) Dupré Engineering	Audi RS3	480	(Germany) Jürgen Nett	1–8
(Germany) Dupré Engineering	Audi RS3	480	(Austria) Maximilan Malinowski	9
(Germany) Dupré Engineering	Audi RS3	482	(Germany) Claus Dupré	6
(Germany) Dupré Engineering	Audi RS3	482	(Austria) Maximilan Malinowski	6
(Germany) Dupré Engineering	Audi RS3	482	(Germany) René Steiger	6
	Renault Mégane III RS	481	(Germany) Robert Neumann	2–3, 7–8
	Renault Mégane III RS	481	(Germany) Martin Kafka	2–3
	Renault Mégane III RS	481	(Germany) Oliver Kriese	7–10
	Renault Mégane III RS	481	(Germany) Gregor Starck	9
(Germany) Team HAL	Hyundai i30N Fastback	486	(Japan) Gaku Hoshino	3
(Germany) Team HAL	Hyundai i30N Fastback	486	(Japan) Takafumi Hoshino	3
(Germany) Team HAL	Hyundai i30N Fastback	486	(Japan) Atsushi Taniguchi	3
(Germany) SRS Team Sorg Rennsport	BMW 128ti	488	(Italy) Alberto Carobbio	4–5
(Germany) SRS Team Sorg Rennsport	BMW 128ti	488	(Italy) Ugo Vicenzi	4–5
(Germany) SRS Team Sorg Rennsport	BMW 128ti	488	(Austria) Raphael Rennhofer	4–5
(Germany) SRS Team Sorg Rennsport	BMW 128ti	488	(Germany) Markus Bückle	10
(Germany) SRS Team Sorg Rennsport	BMW 128ti	488	(Germany) Maximilian Hill	10
(Germany) SRS Team Sorg Rennsport	BMW 128ti	488	(Germany) Tabea Jünger	10
(Germany) Keeevin Sports and Racing	Renault Mégane III RS	490	(Poland) Aleksy Drywien	9
(Germany) Keeevin Sports and Racing	Renault Mégane III RS	490	(Poland) Rafal Piotrowski	9
(Germany) Keeevin Sports and Racing	Renault Mégane III RS	499	(Poland) Sebastian Lawniczeck	1
(Germany) Keeevin Sports and Racing	Renault Mégane III RS	499	(Austria) Raphael Rennhofer	1
(Germany) Keeevin Sports and Racing	Renault Mégane III RS	499	(Germany) Daniel Sowada	1
(Germany) STENLE Marketing by Mertens Motorsport	Hyundai i30N	491	(India) Akshay Gupta	1–5, 7–10
(Germany) STENLE Marketing by Mertens Motorsport	Hyundai i30N	491	(Germany) Alex Schneider	1–5, 7–10
(Germany) STENLE Marketing by Mertens Motorsport	Hyundai i30N	491	(Germany) Daniel Mertens	1–5
(Germany) STENLE Marketing by Mertens Motorsport	Hyundai i30N	491	(Germany) Richard Schäfer	7
(Germany) STENLE Marketing by Mertens Motorsport	Hyundai i30N	491	(United Kingdom) Leonidas Karavasili	8
(Germany) STENLE Marketing by Mertens Motorsport	Hyundai i30N	491	(Germany) Darian Donkel	9–10
(Germany) STENLE Marketing by Mertens Motorsport	Hyundai i30N	492	(South Korea) Son Geon	1, 9
(Germany) STENLE Marketing by Mertens Motorsport	Hyundai i30N	492	(South Korea) Kim Youngchan	1
(Germany) STENLE Marketing by Mertens Motorsport	Hyundai i30N	492	(Belgium) Jarno D'Hauw	6
(Germany) STENLE Marketing by Mertens Motorsport	Hyundai i30N	492	(India) Akshay Gupta	6
(Germany) STENLE Marketing by Mertens Motorsport	Hyundai i30N	492	(Germany) Alex Schneider	6
(Germany) STENLE Marketing by Mertens Motorsport	Hyundai i30N	492	(United Kingdom) Callum Davies	7–8
(Germany) STENLE Marketing by Mertens Motorsport	Hyundai i30N	492	(United Kingdom) Samuel Harrison	7–8
(Germany) STENLE Marketing by Mertens Motorsport	Hyundai i30N	492	(United Kingdom) Leonidas Karavasili	7
(Germany) STENLE Marketing by Mertens Motorsport	Hyundai i30N	492	(China) Kuang Canwei	7
(Germany) STENLE Marketing by Mertens Motorsport	Hyundai i30N	492	(Germany) Michael Wolpertinger	8
(Germany) STENLE Marketing by Mertens Motorsport	Hyundai i30N	492	(Germany) Fabian Tillmann	9
(Germany) STENLE Marketing by Mertens Motorsport	Hyundai i30N	496	(Germany) Ralf Wiesner	1–3, 6, 9
(Germany) STENLE Marketing by Mertens Motorsport	Hyundai i30N	496	(Germany) Axel Schneider	1, 3, 6
(Germany) STENLE Marketing by Mertens Motorsport	Hyundai i30N	496	(Germany) Daniel Mertens	2
(Germany) STENLE Marketing by Mertens Motorsport	Hyundai i30N	496	(United Kingdom) Callum Davies	7–8
(Germany) STENLE Marketing by Mertens Motorsport	Hyundai i30N	496	(United Kingdom) Samuel Harrison	7, 9
(Germany) STENLE Marketing by Mertens Motorsport	Hyundai i30N	496	(Germany) Fabian Tillmann	8
	Volkswagen Golf 8 GTI Clubsport	494	(Germany) Pascal Otto Fritzsche	1–10
	Volkswagen Golf 8 GTI Clubsport	494	(Germany) Thomas Schönfeld	1–10
VT2-RWD
	Toyota Supra	268	(Japan) Takashi Ito	4–5
	Toyota Supra	268	(Japan) Kohta Kawaai	4–5
	Toyota Supra	268	(Malaysia) Chong Kiat Wai	4–5
(Germany) Teichmann Racing	Toyota Supra	484	(Germany) Michael Mönch	4–5
(Germany) Teichmann Racing	Toyota Supra	484	(Germany) Karl-Heinz Teichmann	4–5
(Germany) Teichmann Racing	Toyota Supra	484	(Germany) Marco Schmitz	4–5
(Germany) Teichmann Racing	Toyota Supra	484	(Brazil) Flavia Pellegrino Fernandes	4–5
(Germany) Adrenalin Motorsport	BMW 330i G20	500	(Germany) Philipp Leisen	1–10
(Germany) Adrenalin Motorsport	BMW 330i G20	500	(Germany) Philipp Stahlschmidt	1–10
(Germany) Adrenalin Motorsport	BMW 330i G20	500	(Germany) Daniel Zils	1–10
(Germany) Adrenalin Motorsport	BMW 330i G20	501	(Germany) Sub7BTG	1–2, 4–10, L
(Germany) Adrenalin Motorsport	BMW 330i G20	501	(Germany) Matthias Beckwermert	1–2, 4–6, 9–10, L
(Germany) Adrenalin Motorsport	BMW 330i G20	501	(Germany) Philipp Stahlschmidt	7
(Germany) Adrenalin Motorsport	BMW 330i G20	501	(Germany) Philipp Leisen	8
(Singapore) Giti Tire Motorsport by WS Racing	BMW 330i G20	502	(Germany) Niklas Ehrhardt	1–6
(Singapore) Giti Tire Motorsport by WS Racing	BMW 330i G20	502	(Germany) Thomas Ehrhardt	1–6
(Singapore) Giti Tire Motorsport by WS Racing	BMW 330i G20	502	(Canada) Damon Surzyshyn	1
(Singapore) Giti Tire Motorsport by WS Racing	BMW 330i G20	502	(Germany) Jan Ullrich	2, 6
(Singapore) Giti Tire Motorsport by WS Racing	BMW 330i G20	502	(Czech Republic) Michal Makes	3
(Singapore) Giti Tire Motorsport by WS Racing	BMW 330i G20	502	(United Kingdom) Thomas Canning	4–5
(Singapore) Giti Tire Motorsport by WS Racing	BMW 330i G20	502	(Germany) Fabian Pirrone	6, 10
(Singapore) Giti Tire Motorsport by WS Racing	BMW 330i G20	502	(Norway) Emil Christian Gjerdrum	9
(Singapore) Giti Tire Motorsport by WS Racing	BMW 330i G20	502	(Germany) Ingo Horst	9
(Singapore) Giti Tire Motorsport by WS Racing	BMW 330i G20	502	(Germany) Lutz Horst	9
(Singapore) Giti Tire Motorsport by WS Racing	BMW 330i G20	502	(Germany) Robert Hinzer	10
(Singapore) Giti Tire Motorsport by WS Racing	BMW 330i G20	502	(Australia) Bart Horsten	10
(Singapore) Giti Tire Motorsport by WS Racing	BMW 330i G20	502	(United Kingdom) Jack James	L
(Singapore) Giti Tire Motorsport by WS Racing	BMW 330i G20	502	(Germany) Marian Möller	L
(Singapore) Giti Tire Motorsport by WS Racing	BMW 330i G20	506	(United Kingdom) Jack James	1–5
(Singapore) Giti Tire Motorsport by WS Racing	BMW 330i G20	506	(Germany) Jan Ullrich	1, 5
(Singapore) Giti Tire Motorsport by WS Racing	BMW 330i G20	506	(Germany) Fabian Pirrone	1
(Singapore) Giti Tire Motorsport by WS Racing	BMW 330i G20	506	(Czech Republic) Michal Makes	2
(Singapore) Giti Tire Motorsport by WS Racing	BMW 330i G20	506	(Australia) Lachlan Robinson	3
(Singapore) Giti Tire Motorsport by WS Racing	BMW 330i G20	506	(China) Yeh Chejen	3
(Singapore) Giti Tire Motorsport by WS Racing	BMW 330i G20	506	(China) Wu Chengqi	4–5
(Singapore) Giti Tire Motorsport by WS Racing	BMW 330i G20	506	(China) Liu Kainian	4–5
(Singapore) Giti Tire Motorsport by WS Racing	BMW 330i G20	506	(Austria) Elena Egger	9–10
(Singapore) Giti Tire Motorsport by WS Racing	BMW 330i G20	506	(Estonia) Carmen Kraav	9–10
(Singapore) Giti Tire Motorsport by WS Racing	BMW 330i G20	506	(Germany) Julia Ponkratz	9
(Singapore) Giti Tire Motorsport by WS Racing	BMW 330i G20	506	(Latvia) Patricija Stalidzane	10
	BMW 330i G20	503	(Germany) Bernd Kleeschulte	2
	BMW 330i G20	503	(Germany) Florian Kramer	2
	BMW 330i G20	503	(Germany) Andreas Müller	2
	BMW 330i G20	503	(Germany) Florian Ebener	9
	BMW 330i G20	503	(Germany) Florian Quante	9
	BMW 330i G20	503	(Switzerland) Alain Valente	9
(Germany) SRS Team Sorg Rennsport	BMW 330i G20	504	(Netherlands) Piet-Jan Ooms	1–10, L
(Germany) SRS Team Sorg Rennsport	BMW 330i G20	504	(Netherlands) Calvin de Groot	1–10
(Germany) SRS Team Sorg Rennsport	BMW 330i G20	504	(Germany) Marius Rauer	1–10
(Germany) SRS Team Sorg Rennsport	BMW 330i G20	504	(United Kingdom) Harry Barton	6
(Germany) SRS Team Sorg Rennsport	BMW 330i G20	504	(Germany) Maximilian Hill	L
(Germany) SRS Team Sorg Rennsport	BMW 330i G20	504	(Germany) Kurt Strube	L
(Germany) SRS Team Sorg Rennsport	BMW 330i G20	514	(Germany) Tim Peeters	1–10
(Germany) SRS Team Sorg Rennsport	BMW 330i G20	514	(Germany) Christoph Blümer	1–3, 6
(Germany) SRS Team Sorg Rennsport	BMW 330i G20	514	(Germany) Kurt Strube	1, 3, 10
(Germany) SRS Team Sorg Rennsport	BMW 330i G20	514	(Germany) Mathias Baar	2, 6
(Germany) SRS Team Sorg Rennsport	BMW 330i G20	514	(France) Loris Cabirou Gomez	4–6
(Germany) SRS Team Sorg Rennsport	BMW 330i G20	514	(Germany) Christian Coen	4–5, L
(Germany) SRS Team Sorg Rennsport	BMW 330i G20	514	(United States) Seth Brown	5
(Germany) SRS Team Sorg Rennsport	BMW 330i G20	514	(United Kingdom) Harry Barton	7–8
(Germany) SRS Team Sorg Rennsport	BMW 330i G20	514	(Netherlands) Joep Breedveld	7–8
(Germany) SRS Team Sorg Rennsport	BMW 330i G20	514	(Germany) Roman Fellner-Felldegg	9–10
(Germany) SRS Team Sorg Rennsport	BMW 330i G20	514	(United Kingdom) Matt	9
(Germany) SRS Team Sorg Rennsport	BMW 330i G20	514	(Germany) Silvio Philipsen	L
(Germany) SRS Team Sorg Rennsport	BMW 330i G20	514	(Germany) Jens Sponheuer	L
(Germany) Time Attack Paderborn	BMW 328i F30	505	(Germany) Michael Wolpertinger	1–3
(Germany) Time Attack Paderborn	BMW 328i F30	505	(Germany) Fabian Tillmann	1, 3
(Germany) Time Attack Paderborn	BMW 328i F30	505	(Switzerland) Boris Hrubesch	1–2
(Germany) Time Attack Paderborn	BMW 328i F30	505	(Denmark) Kaj Schubert	1–2
(Germany) Time Attack Paderborn	BMW 328i F30	505	(United States) William Wachs	2
(Germany) MSC Adenau e.V. im ADAC	BMW 330i	508	(Germany) Beat Schmitz	6–7, 9–10, L
(Germany) MSC Adenau e.V. im ADAC	BMW 330i	508	(Germany) Christian Koch	6, 9–10
(Germany) MSC Adenau e.V. im ADAC	BMW 330i	508	(Germany) Andreas Pöschko	6
(Germany) MSC Adenau e.V. im ADAC	BMW 330i	508	(Germany) Markus Schiller	6
(Germany) MSC Adenau e.V. im ADAC	BMW 330i	508	(Germany) Andre Sommerberg	7, 9, L
	Toyota Supra	509	(Germany) Andreas Ecker	L
	Toyota Supra	509	(United Kingdom) David Pittard	L
	Toyota Supra	509	(Luxembourg) Graham Wilson	L
	BMW 330i G20	510	(Germany) Benjamin Baller	2, 6–7, 10
	BMW 330i G20	510	(Netherlands) Lars van 't Veer	2, 6–7, 10
	BMW 330i G20	510	(Germany) Michael Wolpertinger	6
(Germany) AV Racing by Black Falcon	BMW 330i G20	512	(United States) Tyler Hoffman	7–8
(Germany) AV Racing by Black Falcon	BMW 330i G20	512	(United States) Robert Walker	7–8
(Germany) AV Racing by Black Falcon	BMW 330i G20	512	(United States) Ryan Harrison	8
(Germany) Manheller Racing	Toyota Supra	515	(Germany) Harald Barth	6–7, 9–10, L
(Germany) Manheller Racing	Toyota Supra	515	(Germany) Marcel Manheller	6–7, 9–10
(Germany) Manheller Racing	Toyota Supra	515	(Japan) Yutaka Seki	9
(Germany) Manheller Racing	Toyota Supra	515	(Germany) Jan Jöcker	L
(Germany) Manheller Racing	Toyota Supra	515	(Germany) Stefan Jöcker	L
(Germany) Manheller Racing	BMW 328i F30	516	(Argentina) Andres Bruno Josephsohn	7–8
(Germany) Manheller Racing	BMW 328i F30	516	(Argentina) Eduardo Romanelli	7–8
(Germany) Manheller Racing	BMW 328i F30	516	(Argentina) Jose Visir	7–8
(Germany) Manheller Racing	BMW 328i F30	516	(Belgium) Ken Stessens	L
(Germany) Manheller Racing	BMW 328i F30	516	(Belgium) Marc Stessens	L
(Germany) Team HAL	Toyota Supra	519	(Japan) Masaaki Hatano	2–3, 6–10
(Germany) Team HAL	Toyota Supra	519	(Malaysia) Mitchell Min Jie Cheah	3, 6, 10
(Germany) Team HAL	Toyota Supra	519	(Japan) Masahiro Sasaki	6
(Germany) Team HAL	Toyota Supra	519	(Japan) Tohjiro Azuma	7–8
(Germany) Toyo Tires with Ring Racing	Toyota Supra	520	(Japan) Takuma Miyazono	1, 6–8
(Germany) Toyo Tires with Ring Racing	Toyota Supra	520	(Japan) Masato Kawabata	1, 6
(Germany) Toyo Tires with Ring Racing	Toyota Supra	520	(Germany) Manfred Röss	3–5
(Germany) Toyo Tires with Ring Racing	Toyota Supra	520	(Germany) Matthias Röss	3–5
(Germany) Toyo Tires with Ring Racing	Toyota Supra	520	(Germany) Malte Tack	3–5
(Germany) Toyo Tires with Ring Racing	Toyota Supra	520	(Japan) Hokuto Matsuyama	7–8
VT1
Entry Lists:

==== Cup Class ====
Team	Car	No.	Drivers	Rounds
BMW M240i
(Germany) Adrenalin Motorsport Team Mainhattan Wheels	BMW M240i Racing Cup	1; 650	(Germany) Sven Markert	1–10
(Germany) Adrenalin Motorsport Team Mainhattan Wheels	BMW M240i Racing Cup	1; 650	(Germany) Kevin Wambach	1–10
(Germany) Adrenalin Motorsport Team Mainhattan Wheels	BMW M240i Racing Cup	1; 650	(Germany) Marvin Marino	1
(Germany) Adrenalin Motorsport Team Mainhattan Wheels	BMW M240i Racing Cup	1; 650	(Germany) Adrian Rziczny	2–10
(Germany) Adrenalin Motorsport Team Mainhattan Wheels	BMW M240i Racing Cup	1; 650	(Switzerland) Michelangelo Comazzi	L
(Germany) Adrenalin Motorsport Team Mainhattan Wheels	BMW M240i Racing Cup	1; 650	(United Kingdom) Will Hunt	L
(Germany) Adrenalin Motorsport Team Mainhattan Wheels	BMW M240i Racing Cup	1; 650	(Italy) Ionuc Timis	L
(Germany) Adrenalin Motorsport Team Mainhattan Wheels	BMW M240i Racing Cup	651	(Germany) Lars Harbeck	1–3, 6–10
(Germany) Adrenalin Motorsport Team Mainhattan Wheels	BMW M240i Racing Cup	651	(Belgium) Ugo de Wilde	1
(Germany) Adrenalin Motorsport Team Mainhattan Wheels	BMW M240i Racing Cup	651	(Germany) Hermann Vortkamp	1
(Germany) Adrenalin Motorsport Team Mainhattan Wheels	BMW M240i Racing Cup	651	(Germany) Sebastian Brandl	2
(Germany) Adrenalin Motorsport Team Mainhattan Wheels	BMW M240i Racing Cup	651	(United Kingdom) Farquini Deott	2
(Germany) Adrenalin Motorsport Team Mainhattan Wheels	BMW M240i Racing Cup	651	(Belgium) Axel Soyez	3
(Germany) Adrenalin Motorsport Team Mainhattan Wheels	BMW M240i Racing Cup	651	(Belgium) Dimitri Persoons	3
(Germany) Adrenalin Motorsport Team Mainhattan Wheels	BMW M240i Racing Cup	651	(Germany) Lion Düker	4–5
(Germany) Adrenalin Motorsport Team Mainhattan Wheels	BMW M240i Racing Cup	651	(United Kingdom) Lorcan Hanafin	4–5
(Germany) Adrenalin Motorsport Team Mainhattan Wheels	BMW M240i Racing Cup	651	(Luxembourg) Johny Marechal	4
(Germany) Adrenalin Motorsport Team Mainhattan Wheels	BMW M240i Racing Cup	651	(United Kingdom) Sam Weller	5
(Germany) Adrenalin Motorsport Team Mainhattan Wheels	BMW M240i Racing Cup	651	(Norway) Peder Saltvedt	6
(Germany) Adrenalin Motorsport Team Mainhattan Wheels	BMW M240i Racing Cup	651	(Norway) Eirik Wenaas-Schei	6
(Germany) Adrenalin Motorsport Team Mainhattan Wheels	BMW M240i Racing Cup	651	(Germany) Andre Duve	7–8
(Germany) Adrenalin Motorsport Team Mainhattan Wheels	BMW M240i Racing Cup	651	(Germany) Robin Reimer	7
(Germany) Adrenalin Motorsport Team Mainhattan Wheels	BMW M240i Racing Cup	651	(Moldova) Serghei Ievlev	9–10
(Germany) Adrenalin Motorsport Team Mainhattan Wheels	BMW M240i Racing Cup	651	(Norway) Oskar Sandberg	9
(Germany) Adrenalin Motorsport Team Mainhattan Wheels	BMW M240i Racing Cup	651	(Germany) Jacob Erlbacher	10
(Germany) Adrenalin Motorsport Team Mainhattan Wheels	BMW M240i Racing Cup	652	(Ukraine) Leonid Petrov	1–2
(Germany) Adrenalin Motorsport Team Mainhattan Wheels	BMW M240i Racing Cup	652	(South Africa) David Perel	1
(Germany) Adrenalin Motorsport Team Mainhattan Wheels	BMW M240i Racing Cup	652	(Belgium) Ugo de Wilde	1
(Germany) Adrenalin Motorsport Team Mainhattan Wheels	BMW M240i Racing Cup	652	(Germany) Lion Düker	2–3
(Germany) Adrenalin Motorsport Team Mainhattan Wheels	BMW M240i Racing Cup	652	(China) Kuang Canwei	2
(Germany) Adrenalin Motorsport Team Mainhattan Wheels	BMW M240i Racing Cup	652	(Germany) Marc Lehmann	3
(Germany) Adrenalin Motorsport Team Mainhattan Wheels	BMW M240i Racing Cup	652	(Austria) Raphael Rennhofer	3
(Germany) Adrenalin Motorsport Team Mainhattan Wheels	BMW M240i Racing Cup	652	(Norway) Peder Saltvedt	4–5
(Germany) Adrenalin Motorsport Team Mainhattan Wheels	BMW M240i Racing Cup	652	(Denmark) Eirik Wenaas-Schei	4–5
(Germany) Adrenalin Motorsport Team Mainhattan Wheels	BMW M240i Racing Cup	652	(Belgium) Axel Soyez	4
(Germany) Adrenalin Motorsport Team Mainhattan Wheels	BMW M240i Racing Cup	652	(Belgium) Dimitri Persoons	5
(Germany) Adrenalin Motorsport Team Mainhattan Wheels	BMW M240i Racing Cup	652	(Germany) Klaus Faßbender	6
(Germany) Adrenalin Motorsport Team Mainhattan Wheels	BMW M240i Racing Cup	652	(China) Heng Hu	6
(Germany) Adrenalin Motorsport Team Mainhattan Wheels	BMW M240i Racing Cup	652	(China) Jiang Jiawei	6
(Germany) Adrenalin Motorsport Team Mainhattan Wheels	BMW M240i Racing Cup	652	(China) Yang Shuo	6
(Germany) Adrenalin Motorsport Team Mainhattan Wheels	BMW M240i Racing Cup	652	(Moldova) Serghei Ievlev	7–8
(Germany) Adrenalin Motorsport Team Mainhattan Wheels	BMW M240i Racing Cup	652	(Germany) Laura Luft	7–8
(Germany) Adrenalin Motorsport Team Mainhattan Wheels	BMW M240i Racing Cup	652	(Germany) Florian Ebener	7
(Germany) Adrenalin Motorsport Team Mainhattan Wheels	BMW M240i Racing Cup	652	(Netherlands) Filip Hoenjet	8
(Germany) Adrenalin Motorsport Team Mainhattan Wheels	BMW M240i Racing Cup	652	(United Kingdom) Farquini Deott	9
(Germany) Adrenalin Motorsport Team Mainhattan Wheels	BMW M240i Racing Cup	652	(United Kingdom) Ben Pitch	9
(Germany) Adrenalin Motorsport Team Mainhattan Wheels	BMW M240i Racing Cup	652	(Sweden) Viktor Larsson	10
(Germany) Adrenalin Motorsport Team Mainhattan Wheels	BMW M240i Racing Cup	652	(Netherlands) Senna van Soelen	10
(Germany) Adrenalin Motorsport Team Mainhattan Wheels	BMW M240i Racing Cup	652	(Canada) Adam Tang	10
(Germany) Adrenalin Motorsport Team Mainhattan Wheels	BMW M240i Racing Cup	652	(Czech Republic) Martin Bus	L
(Germany) Adrenalin Motorsport Team Mainhattan Wheels	BMW M240i Racing Cup	652	(Brazil) Felipe Drummond	L
(Germany) Adrenalin Motorsport Team Mainhattan Wheels	BMW M240i Racing Cup	652	(Switzerland) Flurin Zimmermann	L
(Germany) Adrenalin Motorsport Team Mainhattan Wheels	BMW M240i Racing Cup	653	(Germany) Sub7BTG	3
(Germany) Adrenalin Motorsport Team Mainhattan Wheels	BMW M240i Racing Cup	653	(Germany) Matthias Beckwermert	3
(Germany) Adrenalin Motorsport Team Mainhattan Wheels	BMW M240i Racing Cup	653	(United States) Johnny Huang	4–5
(Germany) Adrenalin Motorsport Team Mainhattan Wheels	BMW M240i Racing Cup	653	(United States) Nico Silva	4–5
(Germany) Adrenalin Motorsport Team Mainhattan Wheels	BMW M240i Racing Cup	653	(United States) Robert Walker	4–5
(Germany) Adrenalin Motorsport Team Mainhattan Wheels	BMW M240i Racing Cup	653	(Austria) Jannik-Julius Bernhard	6
(Germany) Adrenalin Motorsport Team Mainhattan Wheels	BMW M240i Racing Cup	653	(Czech Republic) Martin Bus	6
(Germany) Adrenalin Motorsport Team Mainhattan Wheels	BMW M240i Racing Cup	653	(Germany) Joris Primke	6
(Germany) Adrenalin Motorsport Team Mainhattan Wheels	BMW M240i Racing Cup	653	(France) Grégoire Boutonnet	9
(Germany) Adrenalin Motorsport Team Mainhattan Wheels	BMW M240i Racing Cup	653	(France) Laurent Laparra	9
(Germany) Adrenalin Motorsport Team Mainhattan Wheels	BMW M240i Racing Cup	653	(Switzerland) Durim Kaliki	9
(Germany) Adrenalin Motorsport Team Mainhattan Wheels	BMW M240i Racing Cup	653	(United States) Robert Mau	10
(Germany) Adrenalin Motorsport Team Mainhattan Wheels	BMW M240i Racing Cup	653	(United States) John Salerno	10
(Germany) Adrenalin Motorsport Team Mainhattan Wheels	BMW M240i Racing Cup	653	(Germany) Christian Scherer	10
(Germany) SR Motorsport by Schnitzelalm	BMW M240i Racing Cup	655	(Germany) Timo Kieslich	10
(Germany) SR Motorsport by Schnitzelalm	BMW M240i Racing Cup	655	(Germany) Wilhelm Kühne	10
(Belgium) JJ Motorsport	BMW M240i Racing Cup	658	(Belgium) Hakan Sari	1, 3
(Belgium) JJ Motorsport	BMW M240i Racing Cup	658	(Belgium) Recep Sari	1, 3
(Belgium) JJ Motorsport	BMW M240i Racing Cup	658	(Turkey) Ersin Yücesan	1
(Germany) Keeevin Sports and Racing	BMW M240i Racing Cup	660	(Germany) Jörg Schönfelder	2–3
(Germany) Keeevin Sports and Racing	BMW M240i Racing Cup	660	(Germany) Serge van Vooren	2–3
(Germany) Keeevin Sports and Racing	BMW M240i Racing Cup	660	(Germany) Zoran Radulovic	3
(Germany) Keeevin Sports and Racing	BMW M240i Racing Cup	669	(Germany) Valentin Lachenmayer	1
(Germany) Keeevin Sports and Racing	BMW M240i Racing Cup	669	(Germany) Jörg Schönfelder	1
(Germany) Keeevin Sports and Racing	BMW M240i Racing Cup	669	(Germany) Serge van Vooren	1
	BMW M240i Racing Cup	664	(Germany) Bernd Kuepper	6–8
	BMW M240i Racing Cup	664	(Germany) Kevin Küpper	6–8
(Singapore) Giti Tire Motorsport by WS Racing	BMW M240i Racing Cup	665	(Germany) Maximilian Eisberg	1–5
(Singapore) Giti Tire Motorsport by WS Racing	BMW M240i Racing Cup	665	(Germany) Finn Mache	1–3
(Singapore) Giti Tire Motorsport by WS Racing	BMW M240i Racing Cup	665	(Germany) John Lee Schambony	1
(Singapore) Giti Tire Motorsport by WS Racing	BMW M240i Racing Cup	665	(Germany) Fabian Pirrone	2–3, L
(Singapore) Giti Tire Motorsport by WS Racing	BMW M240i Racing Cup	665	(Germany) Luca Link	4–5
(Singapore) Giti Tire Motorsport by WS Racing	BMW M240i Racing Cup	665	(Germany) Marvin Schiede	4–5
(Singapore) Giti Tire Motorsport by WS Racing	BMW M240i Racing Cup	665	(Germany) Robert Hinzer	6
(Singapore) Giti Tire Motorsport by WS Racing	BMW M240i Racing Cup	665	(Germany) Matthias Möller	6
(Singapore) Giti Tire Motorsport by WS Racing	BMW M240i Racing Cup	665	(Germany) Jan Ullrich	7–10, L
(Singapore) Giti Tire Motorsport by WS Racing	BMW M240i Racing Cup	665	(France) Adrien Paviot	7–8, 10
(Singapore) Giti Tire Motorsport by WS Racing	BMW M240i Racing Cup	665	(Australia) Bart Horsten	7–8
(Singapore) Giti Tire Motorsport by WS Racing	BMW M240i Racing Cup	665	(Germany) Niklas Ehrhardt	9
(Singapore) Giti Tire Motorsport by WS Racing	BMW M240i Racing Cup	665	(Germany) Thomas Ehrhardt	9
(Singapore) Giti Tire Motorsport by WS Racing	BMW M240i Racing Cup	665	(Sweden) Andreas Christoffer Andersson	10
(Singapore) Giti Tire Motorsport by WS Racing	BMW M240i Racing Cup	665	(Germany) Ulf Steffens	L
	BMW M240i Racing Cup	666	(United States) Leonard Gousha	L
	BMW M240i Racing Cup	666	(Netherlands) Filip Hoenjet	L
(United Kingdom) Breakell Racing	BMW M240i Racing Cup	667	(Switzerland) Andreas Simon	3, 9
(United Kingdom) Breakell Racing	BMW M240i Racing Cup	667	(United States) Gino Manley	3
(United Kingdom) Breakell Racing	BMW M240i Racing Cup	667	(New Zealand) Aaren Russell	7–8
(United Kingdom) Breakell Racing	BMW M240i Racing Cup	667	(New Zealand) Drew Russell	7–8
(United Kingdom) Breakell Racing	BMW M240i Racing Cup	667	(United Kingdom) Callum Davies	9
(Germany) PTerting Sports by Up2Race	BMW M240i Racing Cup	670	(United States) Henry Drury	1, 3
(Germany) PTerting Sports by Up2Race	BMW M240i Racing Cup	670	(United Kingdom) Alex Sedgwick	1, 3
(Germany) PTerting Sports by Up2Race	BMW M240i Racing Cup	670	(Germany) Torben Berger	1
(Germany) PTerting Sports by Up2Race	BMW M240i Racing Cup	670	(France) Tom Dillmann	2
(Germany) PTerting Sports by Up2Race	BMW M240i Racing Cup	670	(Poland) Jakub Śmiechowski	2
(Germany) PTerting Sports by Up2Race	BMW M240i Racing Cup	670	(Netherlands) John van der Sanden	3
(Germany) PTerting Sports by Up2Race	BMW M240i Racing Cup	671	(France) Tom Dillmann	3
(Germany) PTerting Sports by Up2Race	BMW M240i Racing Cup	671	(Poland) Jakub Śmiechowski	3
(Germany) PTerting Sports by Up2Race	BMW M240i Racing Cup	671	(China) Zhang Zhiqiang	4–5
(Germany) PTerting Sports by Up2Race	BMW M240i Racing Cup	671	(Hong Kong) Li Guanghua	4–5
(Germany) PTerting Sports by Up2Race	BMW M240i Racing Cup	680	(Netherlands) John van der Sanden	1–2, 4–10
(Germany) PTerting Sports by Up2Race	BMW M240i Racing Cup	680	(Germany) Karl Lukaschewsky	1–5
(Germany) PTerting Sports by Up2Race	BMW M240i Racing Cup	680	(Germany) Jannik Reinhard	2–10
(Germany) PTerting Sports by Up2Race	BMW M240i Racing Cup	680	(Germany) Torben Berger	3
(Germany) PTerting Sports by Up2Race	BMW M240i Racing Cup	680	(Germany) Maximilian Eisberg	6
(Germany) PTerting Sports by Up2Race	BMW M240i Racing Cup	680	(Germany) Michel Albers / "Alboretto"	7–8, 10
(Germany) PTerting Sports by Up2Race	BMW M240i Racing Cup	680	(Germany) Anton Abee	9
(Germany) PTerting Sports by Up2Race	BMW M240i Racing Cup	681	(China) Heng Hu	4–5
(Germany) PTerting Sports by Up2Race	BMW M240i Racing Cup	681	(China) Jiang Jiawei	4–5
(Germany) PTerting Sports by Up2Race	BMW M240i Racing Cup	681	(China) Yang Shuo	4–5
	BMW M240i Racing Cup	677	(Switzerland) Thomas Alpiger	3–5, 8
	BMW M240i Racing Cup	677	(Switzerland) Michael Neuhauser	3–5
	BMW M240i Racing Cup	677	(Germany) Henrik Seibel	3–5
	BMW M240i Racing Cup	677	(Switzerland) Marco Grilli	7–8
	BMW M240i Racing Cup	677	(Switzerland) Pieder Decurtins	7
BMW M2 CS
(Germany) Schubert Motorsport	BMW M2 CS	882	(Germany) Torsten Schubert	9
(Germany) Schubert Motorsport	BMW M2 CS	882	(Germany) Michael von Zabienksy	9
(Germany) Schubert Motorsport	BMW M2 CS	882	(Germany) Stefan von Zabiensky	9
(Germany) Schubert Motorsport	BMW M2 CS	885	(Germany) Juliano Holzem	9
(Germany) Schubert Motorsport	BMW M2 CS	885	(Germany) Sandro Holzem	9
(Germany) Schubert Motorsport	BMW M2 CS	885	(Sweden) Alfred Nilsson	9
(Switzerland) Hofor Racing by Bonk Motorsport	BMW M2 CS	888	(Germany) Tim Reiter	3–5
(Switzerland) Hofor Racing by Bonk Motorsport	BMW M2 CS	888	(Germany) Leon Wassertheurer	3–5
(Switzerland) Hofor Racing by Bonk Motorsport	BMW M2 CS	888	(Australia) Michael Bailey	4–5, 7
(Switzerland) Hofor Racing by Bonk Motorsport	BMW M2 CS	888	(Germany) Michael Bonk	4–5
(Switzerland) Hofor Racing by Bonk Motorsport	BMW M2 CS	888	(Germany) Lars Jürgen Zander	7
	BMW M2 CS	899	(Germany) Alexander Becker	8, L
	BMW M2 CS	899	(Germany) Thomas Leyherr	8, L
325i Challenge
	BMW 325i	100	(United States) Thomas Pendergrass	4–5
	BMW 325i	100	(Germany) Desiree Müller	4–5
	BMW 325i	100	(Germany) Stefan Schäfer	4–5
	BMW 325i	100	(Germany) Karsten Welker	4–5
(Germany) EiFelkind Racing	BMW 325i	101	(Germany) Mats Heidler	2–3
(Germany) EiFelkind Racing	BMW 325i	101	(Germany) Stefan Schäfer	2
(Germany) EiFelkind Racing	BMW 325i	101	(Germany) Karsten Welker	2
(Germany) EiFelkind Racing	BMW 325i	101	(Germany) Christoph Merkt	3
(Germany) EiFelkind Racing	BMW 325i	101	(Germany) Moritz Rosenbach	3
(Germany) EiFelkind Racing	BMW 325i	101	(Germany) Nils Renken	6, 9
(Germany) EiFelkind Racing	BMW 325i	101	(Germany) Tim Schwolow	6, 9
(Germany) EiFelkind Racing	BMW 325i	101	(Germany) Heiko Weckenbrock	6, 9
(Germany) EiFelkind Racing	BMW 325i	101	(Switzerland) Marc Arn	6
(Germany) EiFelkind Racing	BMW 325i	101	(Germany) Paul Winter	7–8, L
(Germany) EiFelkind Racing	BMW 325i	101	(United States) Thomas Pendergrass	7–8
(Germany) EiFelkind Racing	BMW 325i	101	(Germany) Patrick Schueren	7–8
(Germany) EiFelkind Racing	BMW 325i	101	(Austria) Markus Fischer	L
(Germany) EiFelkind Racing	BMW 325i	101	(Germany) Henning Hausmeier	L
(Germany) SRS Team Sorg Rennsport	BMW 325i	107	(Israel) Moran Gott	1–10
(Germany) SRS Team Sorg Rennsport	BMW 325i	107	(Israel) Hagay Farran	4–6
(Germany) TEAM JSCompetition	BMW 325i	111	(Germany) Eugen Becker	1–10
(Germany) TEAM JSCompetition	BMW 325i	111	(Germany) Jonas Spölgen	1–10
(Germany) TEAM JSCompetition	BMW 325i	121	(Poland) Damian Lempart	6, 9–10
(Germany) TEAM JSCompetition	BMW 325i	121	(Germany) Alexander Müller	6, 9
(Germany) TEAM JSCompetition	BMW 325i	121	(Poland) Michal Walczak-Makowiecki	6, 9
(Germany) TEAM JSCompetition	BMW 325i	121	(Germany) Denis Robin Wolf	10
(Germany) TEAM JSCompetition	BMW 325i	121	(Switzerland) Flurin Zimmermann	10
(Germany) rent2Drive-racing	BMW 325i	112	(Germany) Manuel Dormagen	1–7, 9
(Germany) rent2Drive-racing	BMW 325i	112	(Germany) Sven Oepen	1–7, L
(Germany) rent2Drive-racing	BMW 325i	112	(Germany) Thomas Ardelt	1–2, 4–5, 9, L
(Germany) rent2Drive-racing	BMW 325i	117	(United Kingdom) David Cox	6–8
(Germany) rent2Drive-racing	BMW 325i	117	(United Kingdom) Joseph Moore	6–8
(Germany) rent2Drive-racing	BMW 325i	700	(Germany) Jürgen Huber	1–3
(Germany) rent2Drive-racing	BMW 325i	700	(Germany) Simon Sagmeister	1–3
(Germany) rent2Drive-racing	BMW 325i	700	(Germany) Dirk Vleugels	1–3
(Germany) Dr. Dr. Stein Tveten motorsport	BMW 325i	116	(Germany) Dr. Dr. Stein Tveten	1–3
(Germany) Dr. Dr. Stein Tveten motorsport	BMW 325i	116	(Germany) Yannick Fübrich	1, 3
(Germany) tm-racing.org	BMW 325i	118	(Germany) Alexander Müller	3
(Germany) tm-racing.org	BMW 325i	118	(Germany) Christian Weber	3
(Germany) tm-racing.org	BMW 325i	118	(Germany) Jan Weber	3
(Germany) Keeevin Sports and Racing	BMW 325i	120	(Germany) Jörg Schönfelder	10
(Germany) Keeevin Sports and Racing	BMW 325i	120	(Germany) Jan Soumagne	10
(Germany) Keeevin Sports and Racing	BMW 325i	123	(Germany) Zoran Radulovic	6
(Germany) Keeevin Sports and Racing	BMW 325i	123	(Germany) Robin Reimer	6
(Germany) Keeevin Sports and Racing	BMW 325i	123	(Germany) Jörg Schauer	6
(Germany) Keeevin Sports and Racing	BMW 325i	123	(Germany) Jens Schneider	6
(Germany) Keeevin Sports and Racing	BMW 325i	130	(Sweden) Dan Berghult	1–10
(Germany) Keeevin Sports and Racing	BMW 325i	130	(Germany) Oliver Frisse	1–10
(Germany) Keeevin Sports and Racing	BMW 325i	130	(Sweden) Juha Miettinen	1–10
	BMW 325i	122	(Germany) Martin Brennecke	L
	BMW 325i	122	(Germany) Sebastian Radermacher	L
Entry Lists:

==== Gruppe H historic cars ====
Team	Car	No.	Drivers	Rounds
H2
	Honda Civic Type R	611	(Germany) Mark Giesbrecht	2, 6–7, 10, L
	Honda Civic Type R	611	(Germany) Frank Kuhlmann	2, 6–7, 10, L
	Honda Civic Type R	611	(Germany) Michael Flehmer	6
(Germany) SFG Schönau e.V. im ADAC	Renault Clio III Cup	620	(Germany) Roman Schiemenz	10
(Germany) SFG Schönau e.V. im ADAC	Renault Clio III Cup	620	(Germany) Matthias Wasel	10
H4
(Switzerland) Hofor Racing	BMW M3 E46 GTR	604	(Switzerland) Michael Kroll	8, 10
(Switzerland) Hofor Racing	BMW M3 E46 GTR	604	(Germany) Thomas Mühlenz	8, 10
(Switzerland) Hofor Racing	BMW M3 E46 GTR	604	(Germany) Lars Jürgen Zander	8, 10
(Switzerland) Hofor Racing	BMW M3 E46 GTR	604	(Germany) Alexander Prinz	9
(Switzerland) Hofor Racing	BMW M3 E46 GTR	604	(Germany) Bernd Kuepper	10
(Switzerland) Hofor Racing	BMW M3 E46 GTR	605	(Switzerland) Michael Kroll	2–3, 6–7
(Switzerland) Hofor Racing	BMW M3 E46 GTR	605	(Germany) Thomas Mühlenz	2–3, 6–7
(Switzerland) Hofor Racing	BMW M3 E46 GTR	605	(Germany) Alexander Prinz	2–3, 6–7
(Switzerland) Hofor Racing	BMW M3 E46 GTR	605	(Germany) Lars Jürgen Zander	3, 7
	Porsche 997 GT3 Cup	609	(Germany) Axel Friedhoff	L
	Porsche 997 GT3 Cup	609	(Germany) Max Friedhoff	L
Entry Lists:

== Results ==
Rnd.	Race	Pole position	Overall winners	Report
NLS1	70. ADAC Westfalenfahrt	(Lithuania) No. 8 Juta Racing	(Germany) No. 3 Falken Motorsports	
NLS1	70. ADAC Westfalenfahrt	(Germany) Alexey Veremenko (Germany) "Selv" (Germany) Frank Stippler	(Germany) Sven Müller (Netherlands) Morris Schuring	
NLS2	ADAC Ruhrpott-Trophy	(Lithuania) No. 8 Juta Racing	(Germany) No. 3 Falken Motorsports	
NLS2	ADAC Ruhrpott-Trophy	(Germany) Alexey Veremenko (Germany) "Selv" (Germany) Frank Stippler	(Belgium) Alessio Picariello (France) Dorian Boccolacci	
NLS3	56. Adenauer ADAC Rundstrecken-Trophy	(Germany) No. 911 Manthey EMA	(Germany) No. 911 Manthey EMA	
NLS3	56. Adenauer ADAC Rundstrecken-Trophy	(Austria) Thomas Preining (Turkey) Ayhancan Güven	(Austria) Thomas Preining (Turkey) Ayhancan Güven	
24H-Q1	ADAC 24h Nürburgring Qualifiers Rennen 1	(Germany) No. 911 Manthey EMA	(Germany) No. 16 Scherer Sport PHX	
24H-Q1	ADAC 24h Nürburgring Qualifiers Rennen 1	(France) Kévin Estre (France) Patrick Pilet	(Switzerland) Patric Niederhauser (Belgium) Laurens Vanthoor	
24H-Q2	ADAC 24h Nürburgring Qualifiers Rennen 2	(Germany) No. 14 Mercedes-AMG Team GetSpeed	(Germany) No. 16 Scherer Sport PHX	
24H-Q2	ADAC 24h Nürburgring Qualifiers Rennen 2	(Belgium) Maxime Martin (Germany) Fabian Schiller (Germany) Luca Stolz	(Switzerland) Patric Niederhauser (Belgium) Laurens Vanthoor	
NLSL	NLS-Light	(Germany) No. 19 Max Kruse Racing	(Germany) No. 76 Max Kruse Racing	
NLSL	NLS-Light	(Germany) Heiko Hammel (Germany) Benjamin Leuchter	(Germany) Nico Otto (Germany) Timo Hochwind	
NLS6	KW 6h ADAC Ruhr-Pokal-Rennen	(Germany) No. 4 Falken Motorsports	(Germany) No. 3 Falken Motorsports	
NLS6	KW 6h ADAC Ruhr-Pokal-Rennen	(Germany) Dennis Marschall (Germany) Nico Menzel	(Austria) Klaus Bachler (Germany) Sven Müller	
NLS7	65. ADAC ACAS Cup	(Germany) No. 3 Falken Motorsports	(Germany) No. 3 Falken Motorsports	
NLS7	65. ADAC ACAS Cup	(France) Julien Andlauer (Germany) Joel Sturm	(France) Julien Andlauer (Germany) Joel Sturm	
NLS8	64. ADAC Reinoldus-Langstreckenrennen	(Germany) No. 44 Car Collection Motorsport	(Germany) No. 6 HRT Ford Performance	
NLS8	64. ADAC Reinoldus-Langstreckenrennen	(Armenia) Artur Goroyan (Switzerland) Alex Fontana	(Germany) Vincent Kolb (Germany) Frank Stippler	
NLS9	57. ADAC Barbarossapreis	(Germany) No. 34 Walkenhorst Motorsport	(Switzerland) No. 31 Emil Frey Racing	
NLS9	57. ADAC Barbarossapreis	(Norway) Anders Buchardt (Norway) Christian Krognes (Ecuador) Mateo Villagomez	(United Kingdom) Chris Lulham (Netherlands) Max Verstappen	
NLS10	1. NLS Sportwarte-Rennen - Final Race of Champions	(Germany) No. 9 HRT Ford Performance	(Germany) No. 4 Falken Motorsports	
NLS10	1. NLS Sportwarte-Rennen - Final Race of Champions	(Germany) Patrick Assenheimer (Germany) Dennis Fetzer (Switzerland) Fabio Scherer	(France) Dorian Boccolacci (Germany) Nico Menzel	

== Championship standings ==
=== Points system ===
==== Drivers ====
For drivers classification, points are awarded based on race duration, position in class, and number of starters in class. At the end of the season, the best seven races will count for the championship and the rest will be dropped; however, disqualifications or race bans cannot be dropped.

In case of a driver entering for multiple cars in a race, they should nominate which car should they score points from; otherwise they automatically score from the car with the lowest start number.

4-hour race

Position in class	Starter cars in class						
Position in class	1	2	3	4	5	6	7+
1st	2	3	4	6	8	11	15
2nd	-	2	3	4	6	8	11
3rd	-	-	2	3	4	6	8
4th	-	-	-	2	3	4	6
5th	-	-	-	-	2	3	4
6th	-	-	-	-	-	2	3
7th	-	-	-	-	-	-	2
8th and below	-	-	-	-	-	-	1

6-hour race

Position in class	Starter cars in class						
Position in class	1	2	3	4	5	6	7+
1st	3	4	5	8	10	14	19
2nd	-	3	4	5	8	10	14
3rd	-	-	3	4	5	8	10
4th	-	-	-	3	4	5	8
5th	-	-	-	-	3	4	5
6th	-	-	-	-	-	3	4
7th	-	-	-	-	-	-	3
8th and below	-	-	-	-	-	-	1

==== Teams ====
For teams championships, points are awarded by finishing position. Also, for NLS Speed-Trophäe (overall teams) classification only, bonus points are awarded for top 3 in qualifying.

Position	1st	2nd	3rd	4th	5th	6th	7th	8th	9th	10th	11th	12th	13th	14th	15th	16th	17th	18th	19th	20th
Qualifying	3	2	1																	
Race	35	28	25	22	20	18	16	14	12	11	10	9	8	7	6	5	4	3	2	1

==== CUP2 & CUP3 ====
Classes CUP2 and CUP3 are part of Porsche Endurance Trophy Nürburgring and have their own points system.

Position	1st	2nd	3rd	4th	5th	6th	7th	8th	9th	10th	11th	12th	13th	14th	15th	Pole	FL
4 hours	20	17	15	13	11	10	9	8	7	6	5	4	3	2	1	1	1
6 hours	30	25.5	22.5	19.5	16.5	15	13.5	12	10.5	9	7.5	6	4.5	3	1.5	1	1

=== Drivers' Classifications ===
==== Gesamtwertung (Overall) ====
Pos.	Driver	Team	Class	NLS1	NLS2	NLS3	24H-Q		NLS6	NLS7	NLS8	NLS9	NLS10	Points
1	(Switzerland) Ranko Mijatovic (Germany) Nick Wüstenhagen	(Germany) No. 187 FK Performance Motorsport	SP10	(1^{11})										109 (151)
1	(Switzerland) Ranko Mijatovic (Germany) Nick Wüstenhagen	(Germany) No. 187 FK Performance Motorsport	SP8T		1^{15}	1^{15}	1^{15}	1^{15}	1^{19}	1^{15}	1^{15}	(1^{15})	(2^{8})	109 (151)
1	(Switzerland) Ranko Mijatovic (Germany) Nick Wüstenhagen	(Germany) No. 188 FK Performance Motorsport	SP8T				Ret‡	Ret‡						109 (151)
3	(Germany) Arne Hoffmeister (Germany) Tim Scheerbarth	(Belgium) No. 921 Mühlner Motorsport	CUP2	1^{15}	1^{15}	1^{15}	1^{15}	(6^{3})	1^{19}	(2^{11})	(2^{11})	1^{15}	1^{15}	109 (134)
5	(Germany) Philipp Leisen	(Germany) No. 500 Adrenalin Motorsport Team Mainhattan Wheels	VT2-RWD	1^{15}	1^{15}	Ret	(2^{11})	1^{15}	2^{14}	1^{15}	1^{15}	1^{15}	(3^{8})	104 (123)
5	(Germany) Philipp Leisen	(Germany) No. 501 Adrenalin Motorsport Team Mainhattan Wheels	VT2-RWD								3^{8} ‡			104 (123)
5	(Germany) Philipp Stahlschmidt	(Germany) No. 500 Adrenalin Motorsport Team Mainhattan Wheels	VT2-RWD	1^{15}	1^{15}	Ret	(2^{11})	1^{15}	2^{14}	1^{15}	1^{15}	1^{15}	(3^{8})	104 (123)
5	(Germany) Philipp Stahlschmidt	(Germany) No. 501 Adrenalin Motorsport Team Mainhattan Wheels	VT2-RWD							4^{6} ‡				104 (123)
5	(Germany) Daniel Zils	(Germany) No. 500 Adrenalin Motorsport Team Mainhattan Wheels	VT2-RWD	1^{15}	1^{15}	Ret	(2^{11})	1^{15}	2^{14}	1^{15}	1^{15}	1^{15}	(3^{8})	104 (123)
8	(Germany) Sven Markert (Germany) Kevin Wambach	(Germany) No. 1 (Note: Entered as No. 650 for the N24 Qualifiers) Adrenalin Motorsport Team Mainhattan Wheels	BMW M240i	1^{15}	1^{11}	1^{15}	1^{15}	1^{15}	1^{19}	Ret	Ret	(6^{3})	1^{11}	101 (104)
10	(Germany) Tobias Wahl	(Germany) No. 187 FK Performance Motorsport	SP10	1^{11}										90
10	(Germany) Tobias Wahl	(Germany) No. 187 FK Performance Motorsport	SP8T		1^{15}	1^{15}	1^{15}	1^{15}	1^{19}					90
10	(Germany) Tobias Wahl	(Germany) No. 188 FK Performance Motorsport	SP8T				Ret‡	Ret‡						90
11	(Germany) Noah Nagelsdiek J (Luxembourg) Carlos Rivas	(Germany) No. 948 48 LOSCH Motorsport by Black Falcon	CUP2	2^{11}	2^{11}	2^{11}	Ret	WD	2^{14}	1^{15}	1^{15}	2^{11}	Ret	88
11	(Germany) Tobias Müller	(Germany) No. 948 48 LOSCH Motorsport by Black Falcon	CUP2	2^{11}	2^{11}	2^{11}			2^{14}	1^{15}	1^{15}	2^{11}	Ret	88
14	(Israel) Moran Gott	(Germany) No. 107 SRS Team Sorg Rennsport	BMW 325i	(4^{4})	1^{15}	1^{15}	1^{8}	1^{8}	1^{19}	1^{11}	(1^{8})	1^{11}	(1^{8})	87 (107)
15	(Germany) Heiko Eichenberg G (United Kingdom) Harley Haughton J	(Germany) No. 959 SRS Team Sorg Rennsport	CUP3	1^{15}	1^{15}	DNS	1^{15}	1^{15}	8^{1}	1^{15}	Ret	2^{11}	Ret	87
17	(Germany) Joshua Bednarski (Germany) Lorenz Stegmann J	(Germany) No. 962 W&S Motorsport	CUP3	13^{1}	Ret	1^{15}			1^{19}	2^{11}	3^{8}	1^{15}	1^{15}	84
19	(United Kingdom) Steve Alvarez Brown (United Kingdom) Jimmy Broadbent (Netherlands) Misha Charoudin (Germany) Manuel Metzger	(Germany) No. 150 Team Bilstein by Black Falcon	SP8T	1^{15}	2^{11}	2^{11}	2^{11}	2^{11}	2^{14}				1^{11}	84
23	(Netherlands) John van der Sanden	(Germany) No. 680 PTerting Sports by Up2Race	BMW M240i	(5^{4})	3^{6}		(8^{1})	2^{11}	2^{14}	1^{15}	2^{11}	1^{15}	(3^{6})	83 (94)
23	(Netherlands) John van der Sanden	(Germany) No. 670 PTerting Sports by Up2Race	BMW M240i			2^{11}								83 (94)
24	(Germany) Christoph Dupré (Germany) Joachim Nett G	(Germany) No. 480 Dupré Engineering	VT2-F+4WD	(8^{1})	1^{15}	Ret	3^{8}	(4^{6})	1^{19}	DSQ	1^{15}	1^{15}	2^{8}	80 (87)
26	(Germany) Jannik Reinhard	(Germany) No. 680 PTerting Sports by Up2Race	BMW M240i		3^{6}	(5^{4})	(8^{1})	2^{11}	2^{14}	1^{15}	2^{11}	1^{15}	3^{6}	78 (83)
27	(Netherlands) Calvin de Groot J (Netherlands) Piet-Jan Ooms (Germany) Marius Rauer	(Germany) No. 504 SRS Team Sorg Rennsport	VT2-RWD	2^{11}	2^{11}	1^{15}	Ret	WD	Ret	3^{8}	2^{11}	2^{11}	2^{11}	78
30	(Germany) Michael Bohrer (Germany) Gerrit Holthaus	(Germany) No. 467 CSRacing	VT2-F+4WD	1^{15}	2^{11}	DSQ	1^{15}	Ret	3^{10}	1^{15}	2^{11}	(3^{8})	Ret	77 (85)
32	(Germany) Jürgen Nett G	(Germany) No. 480 Dupré Engineering	VT2-F+4WD	(8^{1})	1^{15}	Ret	3^{8}	4^{6}	1^{19}	DSQ	1^{15}		2^{8}	71 (72)
33	(Germany) Pascal Otto Fritzsche (Germany) Thomas Schönfeld	No. 494 (No Entry Name)	VT2-F+4WD	Ret	3^{8}	1^{15}	2^{11}	1^{15}	7^{3}	2^{11}	5^{4}	Ret		67
35	(Germany) Tobias Jung (Germany) Christoph Schmitz G (Germany) Marcel Unland	(Germany) No. 470 Auto Thomas by Jung Motorsport	VT2-F+4WD	2^{11}	(4^{6})	3^{8}	(4^{6})	Ret	4^{8}	3^{8}	3^{8}	2^{11}	1^{11}	65 (77)
38	(Germany) Michel Albers / "Alboretto"	(Germany) No. 175 PROsport-Racing	SP10	3^{6}			1^{6}	(1^{6})	2^{8}					62 (74)
38	(Germany) Michel Albers / "Alboretto"	(Germany) No. 175 PROsport-Racing	SP8T		3^{8}	3^{8}							Ret	62 (74)
38	(Germany) Michel Albers / "Alboretto"	(Germany) No. 680 PTerting Sports by Up2Race	BMW M240i							1^{15}	2^{11}		(3^{6})	62 (74)
39	(Norway) Oskar Sandberg	(Germany) No. 651 Adrenalin Motorsport Team Mainhattan Wheels	BMW M240i									2^{11}		62
39	(Norway) Oskar Sandberg	(Germany) No. 940 Adrenalin Motorsport Team Mainhattan Wheels	CUP3	2^{11}	2^{11}	Ret	2^{11}	2^{11}	Ret	4^{6}	Ret		12^{1}	62
40	(Germany) Philipp Gresek (Germany) Richard Gresek G	(Germany) No. 155 Plusline Motorsport	SP8T	4^{6}	(7^{2})	4^{6}	(4^{6})	3^{8}	3^{10}	2^{11}	2^{11}	3^{8}	(3^{6})	60 (74)
Pos.	Driver	Team	Class	NLS1	NLS2	NLS3	24H-Q		NLS6	NLS7	NLS8	NLS9	NLS10	Points

Colour	Result
Gold	Winner
Silver	Second place
Bronze	Third place
Green	Points classification
Blue	Non-points classification
Blue	Non-classified finish (NC)
Purple	Retired, not classified (Ret)
Red	Did not qualify (DNQ)
Red	Did not pre-qualify (DNPQ)
Black	Disqualified (DSQ)
White	Did not start (DNS)
White	Withdrew (WD)
White	Race cancelled (C)
Blank	Did not practice (DNP)
Blank	Did not arrive (DNA)
Blank	Excluded (EX)

‡: Result not counted for classification

Icon	Class
J	Junior-Trophäe
L	Ladies-Trophäe
G	Gentleman-Trophäe

Gesamtwertung - Position 42nd and below
Pos.	Driver	Team	Class	NLS1	NLS2	NLS3	24H-Q		NLS6	NLS7	NLS8	NLS9	NLS10	Points
42	(Germany) Eugen Becker	(Germany) No. 111 TEAM JSCompetition	BMW 325i	1^{11}	3^{8}	Ret	2^{6}	2^{6}	2^{14}	2^{8}	2^{6}	Ret	(2^{6})	59 (65)
43	(Germany) Leonard Oehme (Germany) Moritz Oehme J	(Germany) No. 944 Team 9und11	CUP3	DSQ	4^{6}	Ret			2^{14}	3^{8}	1^{15}	3^{8}	3^{8}	59
45	(Germany) Fabio Grosse (Switzerland) Patrik Grütter	(Germany) No. 901 SRS Team Sorg Rennsport	CUP2	3^{8}	(12^{1})	(5^{4})	(5^{4})	2^{11}	5^{5}	3^{8}	3^{8}	3^{8}	2^{11}	59 (68)
47	(Germany) Fidel Leib	(Germany) No. 909 (Note: Entered as No. 910 for the N24 Qualifier Races) KKrämer Racing	CUP2								5^{4}	4^{6}	5^{4}	56 (57)
47	(Germany) Fidel Leib	(Germany) No. 929 KKrämer Racing	CUP2	Ret	3^{8}	(10^{1})	2^{11}	1^{15}	4^{8}	Ret				56 (57)
48	(United Kingdom) Toby Goodman J (Finland) Philip Miemois (Germany) Moritz Oberheim	(Germany) No. 165 AVIA W&S Motorsport	SP10	2^{8}	1^{6}	Ret			1^{10}	4^{4}	1^{11}	1^{4}		51
48	(United Kingdom) Toby Goodman J (Finland) Philip Miemois (Germany) Moritz Oberheim	(Germany) No. 165 AVIA W&S Motorsport	SP7										1^{8}	51
51	(United States) Nico Silva	(Germany) No. 940 Adrenalin Motorsport Team Mainhattan Wheels	CUP3	2^{11}	2^{11}	Ret	2^{11}	2^{11}	Ret	4^{6}	DSQ			50
52	(Germany) Horst Baumann G	(Germany) No. 950 Schmickler Performance powered by Ravenol	CUP3	3^{8}	6^{3}	3^{8}			3^{10}	5^{4}	2^{11}	4^{6}	(13^{1})	50 (51)
53	(Sweden) Dan Berghult G (Germany) Oliver Frisse (Sweden) Juha Miettinen G	(Germany) No. 130 Keeevin Sports and Racing	BMW 325i	2^{8}	5^{4}	2^{11}	3^{4}	(3^{4})	3^{10}	3^{6}	(3^{4})	3^{6}	(4^{3})	49 (60)
56	(Germany) Yannick Himmels	(Germany) No. 175 PROsport-Racing	SP10	3^{6}			1^{6}	1^{6}						48 (50)
56	(Germany) Yannick Himmels	(Germany) No. 175 PROsport-Racing	SP8T		3^{8}	3^{8}								48 (50)
56	(Germany) Yannick Himmels	(Belgium) No. 939 Mühlner Motorsport	CUP3						7^{3}	(11^{1})	(8^{1})	Ret	2^{11}	48 (50)
57	(Germany) Tim Peeters	(Germany) No. 514 SRS Team Sorg Rennsport	VT2-RWD	3^{8}	4^{6}	3^{8}	3^{8}	(7^{2})	(8^{1})	5^{4}	4^{6}	6^{3}	(7^{2})	43 (48)
58	(Germany) Alexander Hardt (United States) Peter Ludwig G (Germany) Maik Rosenberg	(Germany) No. 900 Black Falcon Team ZIMMERMANN	CUP2	4^{6}	4^{6}	4^{6}			6^{4}	4^{6}	4^{6}	(5^{4})	3^{8}	42 (46)
61	(Germany) Sub7BTG	(Germany) No. 501 Adrenalin Motorsport Team Mainhattan Wheels	VT2-RWD	4^{6}	Ret		Ret	3^{8}	4^{8}	4^{6}	3^{8}	5^{4}	Ret	41
61	(Germany) Sub7BTG	(Germany) No. 653 Adrenalin Motorsport Team Mainhattan Wheels	BMW M240i			11^{1}								41
62	(Germany) Florian Ebener	(Germany) No. 440 QTQ Raceperformance	V5	1^{6}	1^{8}	1^{6}				1^{4}	Ret	1^{8}	1^{6}	38
63	(Germany) Kai Riemer G	(Belgium) No. 939 Mühlner Motorsport	CUP3										2^{11}	38
63	(Germany) Kai Riemer G	(Germany) No. 962 W&S Motorsport	CUP3	13^{1}	Ret	1^{15}				2^{11}	DSQ			38
64	(Germany) Nick Deißler J (Germany) Aaron Wenisch	(Germany) No. 941 Adrenalin Motorsport Team Mainhattan Wheels	CUP3	5^{4}	(8^{1})	5^{4}	(9^{1})	3^{8}	5^{5}	(6^{3})	4^{6}	5^{4}	4^{6}	37 (42)
66	(Ukraine) Oleksiy Kikireshko	(Germany) No. 901 SRS Team Sorg Rennsport	CUP2	3^{8}	12^{1}	5^{4}	5^{4}	2^{11}						35 (36)
66	(Ukraine) Oleksiy Kikireshko	(Germany) No. 905 PTerting Sports by Up2Race	CUP2										4^{6}	35 (36)
66	(Ukraine) Oleksiy Kikireshko	(Germany) No. 917 Raceworxx Automotive	CUP2						12^{1}			(12^{1})		35 (36)
67	(Japan) Masaaki Hatano	(Germany) No. 519 Team HAL	VT2-RWD		3^{8}	4^{6}			3^{10}	9^{1}	DSQ	4^{6}	5^{4}	35
68	(Germany) Janina Schall J L	(Singapore) No. 146 Giti Tire Motorsport by WS Racing	SP8T	Ret	6^{3}	(8^{1})				3^{8}	3^{8}	5^{4}		34 (35)
68	(Germany) Janina Schall J L	(Singapore) No. 146 Giti Tire Motorsport by WS Racing	AT 3				1^{3}	1^{3}	1^{5}					34 (35)
69	(Germany) Sascha Steinhardt	(Germany) No. 50 équipe vitesse	SP9 Am									3^{3}		34
69	(Germany) Sascha Steinhardt	(Germany) No. 912 KKrämer Racing	CUP2	5^{4}	Ret	13^{1}								34
69	(Germany) Sascha Steinhardt	(Germany) No. 929 KKrämer Racing	CUP2				2^{11}	1^{15}						34
70	(Germany) Alex Schneider	(Germany) No. 491 STENLE Marketing by Mertens Motorsport	VT2-F+4WD	Ret	Ret	Ret	Ret	WD		4^{6}	7^{2}	4^{6}	3^{6}	34
70	(Germany) Alex Schneider	(Germany) No. 492 STENLE Marketing by Mertens Motorsport	VT2-F+4WD						2^{14}					34
70	(Germany) Alex Schneider	(Germany) No. 496 STENLE Marketing by Mertens Motorsport	VT2-F+4WD	3^{8} ‡		4^{6} ‡			9^{1} ‡					34
70	(India) Akshay Gupta	(Germany) No. 491 STENLE Marketing by Mertens Motorsport	VT2-F+4WD	Ret	Ret	Ret	Ret	WD		4^{6}	7^{2}	4^{6}	3^{6}	34
70	(India) Akshay Gupta	(Germany) No. 492 STENLE Marketing by Mertens Motorsport	VT2-F+4WD						2^{14}					34
72	(Germany) Christian Büllesbach (Germany) Klaus Faßbender G (Germany) Andreas Schettler G	(Germany) No. 396 Adrenalin Motorsport Team Mainhattan Wheels	V6	1^{3}	1^{4}	1^{8}	1^{4}	1^{4}	2^{4}	(1^{3})	(1^{3})	(2^{3})	1^{6}	33 (42)
75	(Germany) Timo Hochwind	(Germany) No. 10 Max Kruse Racing	AT 3	Ret	1^{11}	Ret			2^{4}	1^{6}	1^{4}	1^{4}	1^{3}	32
76	(Germany) Maik Rönnefarth	(Germany) No. 312 Schmickler Performance powered by Ravenol	SP3T	1^{8}	1^{8}	1^{8}			1^{4}			Ret	1^{4}	32
77	(Germany) Stefan Kruse G	(Germany) No. 941 Adrenalin Motorsport Team Mainhattan Wheels	CUP3	5^{4}	(8^{1})	5^{4}			5^{5}	6^{3}	4^{6}	5^{4}	4^{6}	32 (33)
78	(Germany) Tobias Vazquez-Garcia	(Germany) No. 909 KKrämer Racing	CUP2								5^{4}	4^{6}	5^{4}	31
78	(Germany) Tobias Vazquez-Garcia	(Germany) No. 929 KKrämer Racing	CUP2	Ret	3^{8}	10^{1}			4^{8}	Ret				31
79	(Germany) Alexey Veremenko (Germany) "Selv"	(Lithuania) No. 8 Juta Racing	SP9 Pro-Am	2^{4}	1^{11}		2^{6}	Ret	DNS	Ret	1^{4}	2^{2}	2^{3}	30
81	(Germany) Maximilian Simons J	(Germany) No. 471 Auto Thomas by Jung Motorsport	VT2-F+4WD	5^{4}						5^{4}	6^{3}	6^{3}	5^{3}	29 (30)
81	(Germany) Maximilian Simons J	(Germany) No. 472 Auto Thomas by Jung Motorsport	VT2-F+4WD				8^{1}	2^{11}	(10^{1})					29 (30)
82	(Germany) Karsten Krämer	(Germany) No. 909 KKrämer Racing	CUP2						7^{3}	8^{1}			5^{4}	28
82	(Germany) Karsten Krämer	(Germany) No. 912 KKrämer Racing	CUP2	5^{4}	Ret	13^{1}								28
82	(Germany) Karsten Krämer	(Germany) No. 929 KKrämer Racing	CUP2				NC	1^{15}						28
83	(Switzerland) Dario Stanco J	(Germany) No. 323 Max Kruse Racing	SP3T	2^{6}			1^{6}	1^{4}	2^{3}			1^{4}		27
83	(Switzerland) Dario Stanco J	(Germany) No. 819 Max Kruse Racing	AT 3			1^{4}								27
84	(Germany) Manuel Dormagen	(Germany) No. 112 rent2Drive-racing	BMW 325i	5^{3}	Ret	NC	4^{3}	4^{3}	4^{8}	6^{2}		2^{8}		27
85	(Germany) Kersten Jodexnis G	(Germany) No. 919 ClickversicherungTeam	CUP2	DSQ	5^{4}	9^{1}	3^{8}	3^{8}	(9^{1})	NC	6^{3}	6^{3}		27 (28)
86	(Germany) Matthias Beckwermert	(Germany) No. 501 Adrenalin Motorsport Team Mainhattan Wheels	VT2-RWD	4^{6}	Ret		Ret	3^{8}	4^{8}			5^{4}	Ret	27
86	(Germany) Matthias Beckwermert	(Germany) No. 653 Adrenalin Motorsport Team Mainhattan Wheels	BMW M240i			11^{1}								27
87	(Switzerland) Martin Kroll G	(Switzerland) No. 189 Hofor Racing by Bonk Motorsport	SP8T	Ret	(9^{1})	6^{3}	6^{3}	4^{6}	5^{5}	6^{3}	6^{3}	Ret	4^{4}	27 (28)
88	(Germany) Axel Sartingen G	(Germany) No. 70 Black Falcon Team ZIMMERMANN	SP7	Ret	1^{6}	1^{4}			Ret	1^{8}	Ret	1^{4}	3^{4}	26
89	(Germany) Daniel Korn (Germany) Tobias Korn (Germany) Ulrich Korn G	(Germany) No. 444 Adrenalin Motorsport Team Mainhattan Wheels	V5	(4^{2})	3^{4}	Ret	1^{4}	1^{4}	1^{4}	2^{3}	2^{3}	Ret	2^{4}	26 (28)
92	(Germany) Stephan Brodmerkel G	(Germany) No. 164 W&S Motorsport	SP10	5^{3}	2^{4}	2^{6}			5^{3}	Ret	4^{4}	Ret		26
92	(Germany) Stephan Brodmerkel G	(Germany) No. 164 W&S Motorsport	SP7										2^{6}	26
93	(Germany) Karl Lukaschewsky J	(Germany) No. 680 PTerting Sports by Up2Race	BMW M240i	5^{4}	3^{6}	5^{4}	8^{1}	2^{11}						26
94	(Germany) Richard-Sven Karl Jodexnis	(Germany) No. 919 ClickversicherungTeam	CUP2				3^{8}	3^{8}	9^{1} ‡					26
94	(Germany) Richard-Sven Karl Jodexnis	(Germany) No. 982 W&S Motorsport	CUP3	6^{3}	10^{1}	9^{1}			10^{1}	9^{1}	6^{3}	7^{2}	Ret	26
95	(Germany) Claudius Karch G	(Germany) No. 312 Schmickler Performance powered by Ravenol	SP3T	1^{8}	1^{8}	1^{8}								24
96	(Germany) Frank Stippler	(Germany) No. 2 HRT Ford Performance	SP9 Pro	DNS	7^{2}	WD								24
96	(Germany) Frank Stippler	(Germany) No. 6 HRT Ford Performance	SP9 Pro						3^{3}	Ret	1^{4}	3^{3}	3^{2}	24
96	(Germany) Frank Stippler	(Lithuania) No. 8 Juta Racing	SP9 Pro-Am	2^{4}	1^{11} ‡		2^{6}	Ret	DNS	Ret	1^{4} ‡		2^{3} ‡	24
97	(Germany) Michele di Martino	(Germany) No. 909 KKrämer Racing	CUP2	DSQ	6^{3}	3^{8}	DNS	Ret		8^{1}				24
97	(Germany) Michele di Martino	(Germany) No. 929 KKrämer Racing	CUP2						4^{8}	5^{4}				24
98	(Germany) Danny Brink (Armenia) Artur Goroyan	(Armenia) No. 777 Goroyan RT by sharky-racing	TCR	1^{2}	2^{4}	Ret	3^{3}	3^{3}	1^{4}	1^{4}	(1^{2})	(3^{2})	1^{3}	23 (27)
100	(Germany) Jürgen Vöhringer G	(Germany) No. 164 W&S Motorsport	SP10	5^{3}	2^{4}	2^{6}				Ret	4^{4}			23
100	(Germany) Jürgen Vöhringer G	(Germany) No. 164 W&S Motorsport	SP7										2^{6}	23
101	(Germany) Jasmin Preisig L	(Germany) No. 10 Max Kruse Racing	AT 3						2^{4}	1^{6}	1^{4}	1^{4}		22
101	(Germany) Jasmin Preisig L	(Germany) No. 33 Max Kruse Racing	AT 3		4^{4}									22
101	(Germany) Jasmin Preisig L	(Germany) No. 76 Max Kruse Racing	AT 3			Ret								22
102	(Japan) Takayuki Kinoshita G (Germany) Michael Tischner G	(Germany) No. 170 Toyo Tires with Ring Racing	SP10	4^{4}	3^{3}	1^{8}	3^{3}	2^{4}						22
104	(Austria) David Griessner	(Germany) No. 940 Adrenalin Motorsport Team Mainhattan Wheels	CUP3	2^{11}	2^{11}	Ret			Ret					22
105	(United Kingdom) Joshua Hislop J	(Germany) No. 949 SRS Team Sorg Rennsport	CUP3						6^{4}					22
105	(United Kingdom) Joshua Hislop J	(Germany) No. 969 SRS Team Sorg Rennsport	CUP3	4^{6}	7^{2}	7^{2}				Ret	5^{4}	Ret	5^{4}	22
106	(Germany) Tim Lukas Müller J	(Germany) No. 940 Adrenalin Motorsport Team Mainhattan Wheels	CUP3										(12^{1})	21 (23)
106	(Germany) Tim Lukas Müller J	(Germany) No. 949 SRS Team Sorg Rennsport	CUP3									(8^{1})		21 (23)
106	(Germany) Tim Lukas Müller J	(Germany) No. 977 EiFelkind Racing	CUP3	7^{2}	Ret	10^{1}	3^{8}	4^{6}	9^{1}	8^{1}	7^{2}			21 (23)
107	(Germany) Thomas Ehrhardt G	(Singapore) No. 502 Giti Tire Motorsport by WS Racing	VT2-RWD	6^{3}	7^{2}	Ret	6^{3}	4^{6}	7^{3}					21
107	(Germany) Thomas Ehrhardt G	(Singapore) No. 665 Giti Tire Motorsport by WS Racing	BMW M240i									5^{4}		21
108	(Germany) Maximilian Eisberg J	(Singapore) No. 665 Giti Tire Motorsport by WS Racing	BMW M240i	Ret	Ret	4^{6}	Ret	WD						20
108	(Germany) Maximilian Eisberg J	(Germany) No. 680 PTerting Sports by Up2Race	BMW M240i						2^{14}					20
109	(Germany) Christoph Breuer (Thailand) Kiki Sak Nana (Germany) Dieter Schmidtmann	(Thailand) No. 786 Renazzo Motorsport Team	SP9 Am	Ret	Ret	2^{2}			1^{4}	2^{4}	Ret	1^{6}	1^{3}	19
112	(Germany) Michael Heimrich G (Germany) Arno Klasen G	(Germany) No. 50 équipe vitesse	SP9 Am	Ret	1^{4}	1^{3}	Ret	2^{2}	DSQ	3^{3}	2^{4}	3^{3}	(2^{2})	19 (21)
114	(Germany) Ralf Wiesner G	(Germany) No. 496 STENLE Marketing by Mertens Motorsport	VT2-F+4WD	3^{8}	DNS	4^{6}			9^{1}			5^{4}		19
115	(Germany) Christopher Brück	(Germany) No. 909 KKrämer Racing	CUP2	DSQ	6^{3}	3^{8}	DNS	Ret						19
115	(Germany) Christopher Brück	(Germany) No. 929 KKrämer Racing	CUP2						4^{8}	Ret				19
116	(Germany) Sven Oepen	(Germany) No. 112 rent2Drive-racing	BMW 325i	5^{3}	Ret	NC	4^{3}	4^{3}	4^{8}	6^{2}				19
117	(France) Jérôme Larbi	(Germany) No. 410 rent2Drive-racing	V6							Ret	2^{2}	3^{2}		18
117	(France) Jérôme Larbi	(Germany) No. 445 Taxi-Arbinger-Racing by rent2Drive	V5	2^{4}	4^{3}	3^{3}	3^{2}	3^{2}						18
118	(Germany) Franz Linden G (Germany) Rüdiger Schicht G	(Germany) No. 955 Team Speedworxx	CUP3	15^{1}	5^{4}	14^{1}			4^{8}	Ret	Ret	6^{3}	8^{1}	18
120	(Germany) Michael Eichhorn G	(Germany) No. 471 Auto Thomas by Jung Motorsport	VT2-F+4WD	5^{4}			6^{3}	Ret	8^{1}	5^{4}	6^{3}		5^{3}	18
121	(Switzerland) David Ackermann G	(Germany) No. 410 rent2Drive-racing	V6	2^{2}	3^{2}	4^{3}	2^{3}	2^{3}		Ret	2^{2}	3^{2}	(4^{2})	17 (19)
122	(Germany) Fabio Sacchi	(Germany) No. 81 tm-racing.org	SP7		2^{4}	2^{3}	3^{4}	4^{3}		Ret		2^{3}		17
123	(Germany) Jan-Niklas Stieler J	(Germany) No. 949 SRS Team Sorg Rennsport	CUP3	9^{1}					6^{4}					17
123	(Germany) Jan-Niklas Stieler J	(Germany) No. 969 SRS Team Sorg Rennsport	CUP3		7^{2}	7^{2}				Ret	5^{4}	Ret	5^{4}	17
124	(Germany) Alex Koch	(Germany) No. 910 Smyrlis Racing	CUP2	6^{3}	10^{1}	6^{3}			(10^{1})	6^{3}	7^{2}	7^{2}	6^{3}	17 (18)
125	(Germany) Jörg Schönfelder	(Germany) No. 120 Keeevin Sports and Racing	BMW 325i										5^{2}	16
125	(Germany) Jörg Schönfelder	(Germany) No. 460 Keeevin Sports and Racing	VT3						1^{3}	1^{2}	1^{2}	1^{2}		16
125	(Germany) Jörg Schönfelder	(Germany) No. 660 Keeevin Sports and Racing	BMW M240i		DNS	6^{3}								16
125	(Germany) Jörg Schönfelder	(Germany) No. 669 Keeevin Sports and Racing	BMW M240i	7^{2}										16
126	(Germany) Marvin Marino J	(Germany) No. 1 Adrenalin Motorsport Team Mainhattan Wheels	BMW M240i	1^{15}										15
127	(Germany) Alexander Müller G	(Germany) No. 118 tm-racing.org	BMW 325i			Ret								15
127	(Germany) Alexander Müller G	(Germany) No. 121 TEAM JSCompetition	BMW 325i						4^{5}			Ret		15
127	(Germany) Alexander Müller G	(Germany) No. 979 SRS Team Sorg Rennsport	CUP3	12^{1}	13^{1}	11^{1}	6^{3}	5^{4}						15
128	(Germany) Klaus Koch G	(Germany) No. 910 Smyrlis Racing	CUP2	6^{3}	10^{1}				10^{1}	6^{3}	7^{2}	7^{2}	6^{3}	15
129	(Germany) Georg Arbinger G	(Germany) No. 445 Taxi-Arbinger-Racing by rent2Drive	V5	2^{4}	4^{3}	3^{3}	3^{2}	3^{2}						14
130	(Germany) Thomas Ardelt	(Germany) No. 112 rent2Drive-racing	BMW 325i	5^{3}	Ret		4^{3}‡	4^{3}				2^{8}		14
131	(Austria) Bernhard Wagner G	(Germany) No. 949 SRS Team Sorg Rennsport	CUP3	9^{1}									6^{3}	14 (16)
131	(Austria) Bernhard Wagner G	(Germany) No. 969 SRS Team Sorg Rennsport	CUP3						11^{1}					14 (16)
131	(Austria) Bernhard Wagner G	(Germany) No. 979 SRS Team Sorg Rennsport	CUP3		13^{1}	11^{1}	6^{3}	5^{4}		(13^{1})	(11^{1})			14 (16)
132	(Brazil) Flavia Pellegrino Fernandes L	(Germany) No. 460 Keeevin Sports and Racing	VT3	1^{2}	NC	DNS			1^{3}					13
132	(Brazil) Flavia Pellegrino Fernandes L	(Germany) No. 477 asBest Racing	VT2-F+4WD							6^{3}	9^{1}			13
132	(Brazil) Flavia Pellegrino Fernandes L	(Germany) No. 484 Teichmann Racing	VT2-RWD				Ret	5^{4}						13
133	(Germany) Serge van Vooren G	(Germany) No. 460 Keeevin Sports and Racing	VT3						1^{3}	1^{2}	1^{2}			12
133	(Germany) Serge van Vooren G	(Germany) No. 660 Keeevin Sports and Racing	BMW M240i		DNS	6^{3}								12
133	(Germany) Serge van Vooren G	(Germany) No. 669 Keeevin Sports and Racing	BMW M240i	7^{2}										12
134	(Norway) Håkon Schjærin G	(Norway) No. 801 Møller Bil Motorsport	TCR		1^{6}	1^{4}							2^{2}	12
135	(Germany) Jürgen Huber G (Germany) Simon Sagmeister G (Germany) Dirk Vleugels G	(Germany) No. 700 Team ifb by rent2Drive	BMW 325i	3^{6}	4^{6}	Ret								12
138	(United Kingdom) Harry Barton J	(United Kingdom) No. 180 Barton Racing	SP10	6^{2}										12
138	(United Kingdom) Harry Barton J	(Germany) No. 504 SRS Team Sorg Rennsport	VT2-RWD						Ret					12
138	(United Kingdom) Harry Barton J	(Germany) No. 514 SRS Team Sorg Rennsport	VT2-RWD							5^{4}	4^{6}			12
139	(Germany) Stefan Beyer G	(Germany) No. 949 SRS Team Sorg Rennsport	CUP3	9^{1}	9^{1}	4^{6}				Ret	Ret	8^{1}	6^{3}	12
140	(Germany) René Höber G (Germany) Christoph Krombach	(Germany) No. 982 W&S Motorsport	CUP3	6^{3}	10^{1}	9^{1}			10^{1}	9^{1}	6^{3}	7^{2}	Ret	12
142	(Germany) Dominik Fugel (Germany) Marcel Fugel J	(Germany) No. 22 Max Kruse Racing	AT 1									1^{2}	Ret	11
142	(Germany) Dominik Fugel (Germany) Marcel Fugel J	(Germany) No. 644 Max Kruse Racing	AT 2	1^{2}	1^{4}	1^{3}								11
144	(Germany) Desiree Müller L	No. 100 (No Entry Name)	BMW 325i				5^{2}	5^{2}						11
144	(Germany) Desiree Müller L	(Germany) No. 977 EiFelkind Racing	CUP3	7^{2}	Ret	10^{1}			9^{1}	8^{1}	7^{2}			11
145	(Germany) Alexander Fielenbach	(Germany) No. 917 Raceworxx Automotive	CUP2						12^{1}					10
145	(Germany) Alexander Fielenbach	(Germany) No. 955 Team Speedworxx	CUP3	15^{1}	5^{4}	14^{1}			4^{8} ‡	Ret	Ret	6^{3}		10
146	(Germany) Andreas Gülden	(Germany) No. 347 Toyo Tires with Ring Racing	SP-Pro	1^{2}	Ret	Ret			1^{3}			1^{2}	1^{2}	9
147	(Germany) Oliver Kriese G	(Germany) No. 300 Ollis Garage Racing	SP3T	Ret	4^{3}	WD	Ret	WD						9
147	(Germany) Oliver Kriese G	No. 481 (No Entry Name)	VT2-F+4WD							NC	Ret	7^{2}	4^{4}	9
148	(Germany) Mark Giesbrecht G	No. 611 (No Entry Name)	H2		Ret				1^{3}	1^{2}			1^{3}	8
149	(Italy) Lorenzo Rocco di Torrepadula G	(Germany) No. 50 équipe vitesse	SP9 Am		1^{4}		Ret	2^{2}					2^{2}	8
150	(Germany) Ben Dörr J	(Germany) No. 69 Dörr Motorsport	SP9 Pro-Am	DSQ		1^{8}								8
151	(Germany) Markus Nölken G	(Thailand) No. 945 Renazzo Motorsport Team	CUP3	8^{1}	12^{1}		8^{1}	6^{3}	12^{1}			10^{1}		8
152	(Germany) Marco Schmitz	(Germany) No. 460 Keeevin Sports and Racing	VT3	1^{2}	NC	DNS								6
152	(Germany) Marco Schmitz	(Germany) No. 484 Teichmann Racing	VT2-RWD				Ret	5^{4}						6
153	(Denmark) Lars Nielsen G	(Germany) No. 333 Max Kruse Racing	AT 3	1^{6}										6
154	(Germany) Oliver Kunz G	(Germany) No. 961 W&S Motorsport	CUP3	WD	14^{1}	12^{1}			14^{1}	12^{1}	9^{1}		10^{1}	6
155	(Germany) Karl-Heinz Teichmann G	(Germany) No. 484 Teichmann Racing	VT2-RWD				Ret	5^{4}						4
156	(Germany) Otto Klohs G	(Thailand) No. 945 Renazzo Motorsport Team	CUP3	8^{1}	12^{1}					10^{1}	9^{1}			4
157	(Netherlands) Jan Jaap van Roon	(Germany) No. 927 Max Kruse Racing	CUP2		8^{1}	7^{2}								3
Pos.	Driver	Team	Class	NLS1	NLS2	NLS3	24H-Q		NLS6	NLS7	NLS8	NLS9	NLS10	Points

==== Produktionswagen-Trophäe (Production Car Overall) ====
Pos.	Driver	Team	Class	NLS1	NLS2	NLS3	24H-Q		NLS6	NLS7	NLS8	NLS9	NLS10	Points
1	(Germany) Philipp Leisen	(Germany) No. 500 Adrenalin Motorsport Team Mainhattan Wheels	VT2-RWD	1^{15}	1^{15}	Ret	(2^{11})	1^{15}	2^{14}	1^{15}	1^{15}	1^{15}	(3^{8})	104 (123)
1	(Germany) Philipp Leisen	(Germany) No. 501 Adrenalin Motorsport Team Mainhattan Wheels	VT2-RWD								3^{8} ‡			104 (123)
1	(Germany) Philipp Stahlschmidt	(Germany) No. 500 Adrenalin Motorsport Team Mainhattan Wheels	VT2-RWD	1^{15}	1^{15}	Ret	(2^{11})	1^{15}	2^{14}	1^{15}	1^{15}	1^{15}	(3^{8})	104 (123)
1	(Germany) Philipp Stahlschmidt	(Germany) No. 501 Adrenalin Motorsport Team Mainhattan Wheels	VT2-RWD							4^{6} ‡				104 (123)
1	(Germany) Daniel Zils	(Germany) No. 500 Adrenalin Motorsport Team Mainhattan Wheels	VT2-RWD	1^{15}	1^{15}	Ret	(2^{11})	1^{15}	2^{14}	1^{15}	1^{15}	1^{15}	(3^{8})	104 (123)
4	(Germany) Christoph Dupré (Germany) Joachim Nett	(Germany) No. 480 Dupré Engineering	VT2-F+4WD	(8^{1})	1^{15}	Ret	3^{8}	(4^{6})	1^{19}	DSQ	1^{15}	1^{15}	2^{8}	80 (87)
6	(Netherlands) Calvin de Groot (Netherlands) Piet-Jan Ooms (Germany) Marius Rauer	(Germany) No. 504 SRS Team Sorg Rennsport	VT2-RWD	2^{11}	2^{11}	1^{15}	Ret	WD	Ret	3^{8}	2^{11}	2^{11}	2^{11}	78
9	(Germany) Michael Bohrer (Germany) Gerrit Holthaus	(Germany) No. 467 CSRacing	VT2-F+4WD	1^{15}	2^{11}	DSQ	1^{15}	Ret	3^{10}	1^{15}	2^{11}	(3^{8})	Ret	77 (85)
11	(Germany) Jürgen Nett	(Germany) No. 480 Dupré Engineering	VT2-F+4WD	(8^{1})	1^{15}	Ret	3^{8}	4^{6}	1^{19}	DSQ	1^{15}		2^{8}	71 (72)
12	(Germany) Pascal Otto Fritzsche (Germany) Thomas Schönfeld	No. 494 (No Entry Name)	VT2-F+4WD	Ret	3^{8}	1^{15}	2^{11}	1^{15}	7^{3}	2^{11}	5^{4}	Ret		67
14	(Germany) Tobias Jung (Germany) Christoph Schmitz (Germany) Marcel Unland	(Germany) No. 470 Auto Thomas by Jung Motorsport	VT2-F+4WD	2^{11}	(4^{6})	3^{8}	(4^{6})	Ret	4^{8}	3^{8}	3^{8}	2^{11}	1^{11}	65 (77)
17	(Germany) Tim Peeters	(Germany) No. 514 SRS Team Sorg Rennsport	VT2-RWD	3^{8}	4^{6}	3^{8}	3^{8}	(7^{2})	(8^{1})	5^{4}	4^{6}	6^{3}	(7^{2})	43 (48)
18	(Germany) Sub7BTG	(Germany) No. 501 Adrenalin Motorsport Team Mainhattan Wheels	VT2-RWD	4^{6}	Ret		Ret	3^{8}	4^{8}	4^{6}	3^{8}	5^{4}	Ret	40
19	(Germany) Florian Ebener	(Germany) No. 440 QTQ Raceperformance	V5	1^{6}	1^{8}	1^{6}				1^{4}	Ret	1^{8}	1^{6}	38
20	(Japan) Masaaki Hatano	(Germany) No. 519 Team HAL	VT2-RWD		3^{8}	4^{6}			3^{10}	9^{1}	DSQ	4^{6}	5^{4}	35
21	(Germany) Alex Schneider	(Germany) No. 491 STENLE Marketing by Mertens Motorsport	VT2-F+4WD	Ret	Ret	Ret	Ret	WD		4^{6}	7^{2}	4^{6}	3^{6}	34
21	(Germany) Alex Schneider	(Germany) No. 492 STENLE Marketing by Mertens Motorsport	VT2-F+4WD						2^{14}					34
21	(Germany) Alex Schneider	(Germany) No. 496 STENLE Marketing by Mertens Motorsport	VT2-F+4WD	3^{8} ‡		4^{6} ‡			9^{1} ‡					34
21	(India) Akshay Gupta	(Germany) No. 491 STENLE Marketing by Mertens Motorsport	VT2-F+4WD	Ret	Ret	Ret	Ret	WD		4^{6}	7^{2}	4^{6}	3^{6}	34
21	(India) Akshay Gupta	(Germany) No. 492 STENLE Marketing by Mertens Motorsport	VT2-F+4WD						2^{14}					34
23	(Germany) Christian Büllesbach (Germany) Klaus Faßbender (Germany) Andreas Schettler	(Germany) No. 396 Adrenalin Motorsport Team Mainhattan Wheels	V6	1^{3}	1^{4}	1^{8}	1^{4}	1^{4}	2^{4}	(1^{3})	(1^{3})	(2^{3})	1^{6}	33 (42)
26	(Germany) Maximilian Simons	(Germany) No. 471 Auto Thomas by Jung Motorsport	VT2-F+4WD	5^{4}						5^{4}	6^{3}	6^{3}	5^{3}	29 (30)
26	(Germany) Maximilian Simons	(Germany) No. 472 Auto Thomas by Jung Motorsport	VT2-F+4WD				8^{1}	2^{11}	(10^{1})					29 (30)
27	(Germany) Daniel Korn (Germany) Tobias Korn (Germany) Ulrich Korn	(Germany) No. 444 Adrenalin Motorsport Team Mainhattan Wheels	V5	(4^{2})	3^{4}	Ret	1^{4}	1^{4}	1^{4}	2^{3}	2^{3}	Ret	2^{4}	26 (28)
30	(Germany) Matthias Beckwermert	(Germany) No. 501 Adrenalin Motorsport Team Mainhattan Wheels	VT2-RWD	4^{6}	Ret		Ret	3^{8}	4^{8}			5^{4}	Ret	26
31	(Germany) Ralf Wiesner	(Germany) No. 496 STENLE Marketing by Mertens Motorsport	VT2-F+4WD	3^{8}	DNS	4^{6}			9^{1}			5^{4}		19
32	(France) Jérôme Larbi	(Germany) No. 410 rent2Drive-racing	V6							Ret	2^{2}	3^{2}		18
32	(France) Jérôme Larbi	(Germany) No. 445 Taxi-Arbinger-Racing by rent2Drive	V5	2^{4}	4^{3}	3^{3}	3^{2}	3^{2}						18
33	(Germany) Michael Eichhorn	(Germany) No. 471 Auto Thomas by Jung Motorsport	VT2-F+4WD	5^{4}			6^{3}	Ret	8^{1}	5^{4}	6^{3}		5^{3}	18
34	(Switzerland) David Ackermann	(Germany) No. 410 rent2Drive-racing	V6	2^{2}	3^{2}	4^{3}	2^{3}	2^{3}		Ret	2^{2}	3^{2}	(4^{2})	17 (19)
35	(Germany) Thomas Ehrhardt	(Singapore) No. 502 Giti Tire Motorsport by WS Racing	VT2-RWD	6^{3}	7^{2}	Ret	6^{3}	4^{6}	7^{3}					17
36	(Germany) Georg Arbinger	(Germany) No. 445 Taxi-Arbinger-Racing by rent2Drive	V5	2^{4}	4^{3}	3^{3}	3^{2}	3^{2}						14
37	(Brazil) Flavia Pellegrino Fernandes	(Germany) No. 460 Keeevin Sports and Racing	VT3	1^{2}	NC	DNS			1^{3}					13
37	(Brazil) Flavia Pellegrino Fernandes	(Germany) No. 477 asBest Racing	VT2-F+4WD							6^{3}	9^{1}			13
37	(Brazil) Flavia Pellegrino Fernandes	(Germany) No. 484 Teichmann Racing	VT2-RWD				Ret	5^{4}						13
38	(United Kingdom) Harry Barton	(Germany) No. 504 SRS Team Sorg Rennsport	VT2-RWD						Ret					10
38	(United Kingdom) Harry Barton	(Germany) No. 514 SRS Team Sorg Rennsport	VT2-RWD							5^{4}	4^{6}			10
39	(Germany) Jörg Schönfelder	(Germany) No. 460 Keeevin Sports and Racing	VT3						1^{3}	1^{2}	1^{2}	1^{2}		9
40	(Germany) Serge van Vooren	(Germany) No. 460 Keeevin Sports and Racing	VT3						1^{3}	1^{2}	1^{2}			7
41	(Germany) Marco Schmitz	(Germany) No. 460 Keeevin Sports and Racing	VT3	1^{2}	NC	DNS								6
41	(Germany) Marco Schmitz	(Germany) No. 484 Teichmann Racing	VT2-RWD				Ret	5^{4}						6
42	(Germany) Oliver Kriese	No. 481 (No Entry Name)	VT2-F+4WD							NC	Ret	7^{2}	4^{4}	6
43	(Germany) Karl-Heinz Teichmann	(Germany) No. 484 Teichmann Racing	VT2-RWD				Ret	5^{4}						4
Pos.	Driver	Team	Class	NLS1	NLS2	NLS3	24H-Q		NLS6	NLS7	NLS8	NLS9	NLS10	Points

Colour	Result
Gold	Winner
Silver	Second place
Bronze	Third place
Green	Points classification
Blue	Non-points classification
Blue	Non-classified finish (NC)
Purple	Retired, not classified (Ret)
Red	Did not qualify (DNQ)
Red	Did not pre-qualify (DNPQ)
Black	Disqualified (DSQ)
White	Did not start (DNS)
White	Withdrew (WD)
White	Race cancelled (C)
Blank	Did not practice (DNP)
Blank	Did not arrive (DNA)
Blank	Excluded (EX)

‡: Result not counted for classification

==== Klassensieger-Trophäe (Class) ====
===== SP9 (FIA-GT3) =====
====== Pro ======
Pos.	Driver	Team	NLS1	NLS2	NLS3	24H-Q		NLS6	NLS7	NLS8	NLS9	NLS10	Points
1	(Germany) Frank Stippler	(Germany) No. 2 HRT Ford Performance	DNS	7^{2}	WD								14
1	(Germany) Frank Stippler	(Germany) No. 6 HRT Ford Performance						3^{3}	Ret	1^{4}	3^{3}	3^{2}	14
Non-championship entries
—	(Switzerland) Patric Niederhauser	(Germany) No. 16 Scherer Sport PHX		4^{6}	6^{3}	1^{15}	1^{15}						(39)
—	(France) Dorian Boccolacci	(Germany) No. 3 (Note: Entered as No. 33 for the N24 Qualifiers) Falken Motorsports		1^{15}									(34)
—	(France) Dorian Boccolacci	(Germany) No. 4 (Note: Entered as No. 44 for the N24 Qualifiers) Falken Motorsports	2^{11}			5^{4}	Ret					1^{4}	(34)
—	(Belgium) Laurens Vanthoor	(Germany) No. 16 Scherer Sport PHX				1^{15}	1^{15}						(30)
—	(Germany) Sven Müller	(Germany) No. 3 Falken Motorsports	1^{15}		3^{8}			1^{5}					(28)
—	(Belgium) Alessio Picariello	(Germany) No. 3 Falken Motorsports		1^{15}		Ret	2^{11}						(26)
—	(Germany) Luca Stolz	(Germany) No. 14 Mercedes-AMG Team GetSpeed	Ret		2^{11}	3^{8}	4^{6}						(25)
—	(Germany) Fabian Schiller	(Germany) No. 14 Mercedes-AMG Team GetSpeed			2^{11}	3^{8}	4^{6}						(25)
—	(France) Patrick Pilet	(Germany) No. 16 Scherer Sport PHX		4^{6}									(25)
—	(France) Patrick Pilet	(Germany) No. 911 Manthey EMA				2^{11}	3^{8}						(25)
—	(Netherlands) Morris Schuring	(Germany) No. 3 Falken Motorsports	1^{15}		3^{8}								(23)
—	(Turkey) Ayhancan Güven (Austria) Thomas Preining	(Germany) No. 911 Manthey EMA	3^{8}		1^{15}								(23)
—	(Germany) Nico Menzel	(Germany) No. 3 Falken Motorsports										2^{3}	(23)
—	(Germany) Nico Menzel	(Germany) No. 4 Falken Motorsports	2^{11}			5^{4}	Ret	2^{4}				1^{4}	(23)
—	(France) Kévin Estre	(Germany) No. 911 Manthey EMA				2^{11}	3^{8}						(19)
—	(Germany) Dennis Marschall	(Germany) No. 4 Falken Motorsports		5^{4}	4^{6}	5^{4}	Ret	2^{4}					(18)
—	(Germany) Joel Sturm	(Germany) No. 3 Falken Motorsports							1^{4}	Ret		2^{3}	(17)
—	(Germany) Joel Sturm	(Italy) No. 54 Dinamic GT		Ret	7^{2}	4^{6}	7^{2}				Ret		(17)
—	(Denmark) Bastian Buus	(Italy) No. 54 Dinamic GT	4^{6}	Ret	7^{2}	4^{6}	7^{2}				Ret		(16)
—	(Germany) Tim Heinemann	(Germany) No. 4 Falken Motorsports		5^{4}	4^{6}				2^{3}	2^{3}			(16)
—	(France) Julien Andlauer	(Germany) No. 3 Falken Motorsports				Ret	2^{11}		1^{4}	Ret			(15)
—	(Belgium) Maxime Martin	(Germany) No. 14 Mercedes-AMG Team GetSpeed	Ret			3^{8}	4^{6}						(14)
—	(Germany) Vincent Kolb	(Germany) No. 6 HRT Ford Performance			9^{1}			3^{3}	Ret	1^{4}	3^{3}	3^{2}	(13)
—	(Brazil) Augusto Farfus (Finland) Jesse Krohn (Switzerland) Raffaele Marciello (South Africa) Kelvin van der Linde	(Germany) No. 98 Rowe Racing	5^{4}	3^{8}									(12)
—	(Italy) Mattia Drudi (Norway) Christian Krognes	(Germany) No. 34 Walkenhorst Motorsport		2^{11}		Ret	Ret						(11)
—	(Germany) Maro Engel	(Germany) No. 14 Mercedes-AMG Team GetSpeed	Ret		2^{11}								(11)
—	(Netherlands) Loek Hartog	(Italy) No. 54 Dinamic GT			7^{2}	4^{6}	7^{2}						(10)
—	(Italy) Matteo Cairoli	(Italy) No. 54 Dinamic GT	4^{6}										(6)
—	(United Kingdom) Chris Lulham (Netherlands) Max Verstappen	(Switzerland) No. 31 Emil Frey Racing									1^{6}		(6)
—	(Germany) Dennis Fetzer	(Germany) No. 6 HRT Ford Performance	10^{1}		9^{1}								(6)
—	(Germany) Dennis Fetzer	(Germany) No. 9 HRT Ford Performance									2^{4}		(6)
—	(Estonia) Ralf Aron (United Kingdom) Adam Christodoulou (Canada) Mikaël Grenier	(Germany) No. 17 Mercedes-AMG Team GetSpeed	6^{3}		WD	Ret	6^{3}						(6)
—	(Germany) Benjamin Leuchter	(Germany) No. 4 Falken Motorsports							2^{3}	2^{3}			(6)
—	(Austria) Klaus Bachler	(Germany) No. 3 Falken Motorsports						1^{5}					(5)
—	(Germany) Christian Engelhart	(Germany) No. 27 Red Bull Team ABT			10^{1}	Ret	5^{4}						(5)
—	(Germany) Felipe Fernández Laser (France) Thomas Neubauer	(Japan) No. 45 Realize Kondo Racing with Rinaldi	9^{1}	6^{3}		Ret	8^{1}						(5)
—	(United Kingdom) David Pittard	(Germany) No. 34 Walkenhorst Motorsport			5^{4}	Ret	Ret						(4)
—	(Denmark) Nicki Thiim	(Germany) No. 34 Walkenhorst Motorsport			5^{4}								(4)
—	(Spain) Daniel Juncadella (Italy) Marco Mapelli	(Germany) No. 27 Red Bull Team ABT				Ret	5^{4}						(4)
—	(United Kingdom) Jann Mardenborough (Switzerland) Fabio Scherer	(Germany) No. 9 HRT Ford Performance									2^{4}		(4)
—	(South Africa) David Perel	(Japan) No. 45 Realize Kondo Racing with Rinaldi		6^{3}		Ret	8^{1}						(4)
—	(Germany) Patrick Assenheimer	(Germany) No. 6 HRT Ford Performance			9^{1}			3^{3}					(4)
—	(Austria) Lucas Auer	(Germany) No. 17 Mercedes-AMG Team GetSpeed	6^{3}		WD								(3)
—	(Switzerland) Ricardo Feller	(Germany) No. 16 Scherer Sport PHX			6^{3}								(3)
—	(Austria) Max Hofer (Austria) Christian Klien (Austria) Simon Reicher (Austria) Norbert Siedler	(Austria) No. 84 Eastalent Racing Team				6^{3}	Ret						(3)
—	(Italy) Mirko Bortolotti (Germany) Luca Engstler	(Germany) No. 27 Red Bull Team ABT	7^{2}		10^{1}								(3)
—	(Germany) Jusuf Owega	(Germany) No. 2 HRT Ford Performance		7^{2}	WD								(3)
—	(Germany) Jusuf Owega	(Germany) No. 6 HRT Ford Performance	10^{1}										(3)
—	(Norway) Dennis Olsen	(Germany) No. 2 HRT Ford Performance	DNS	7^{2}									(2)
—	(Germany) Hubert Haupt	(Germany) No. 2 HRT Ford Performance		7^{2}	WD								(2)
—	(South Africa) Jordan Pepper	(Germany) No. 27 Red Bull Team ABT	7^{2}										(2)
—	(Germany) Luca Ludwig	(Germany) No. 15 (Note: Entered as No. 1 for the N24 Qualifiers) Scherer Sport PHX	8^{1}		8^{1}	Ret	WD						(2)
—	(Zimbabwe) Axcil Jefferies	(Japan) No. 45 Realize Kondo Racing with Rinaldi	9^{1}			Ret	8^{1}						(2)
—	(Germany) Dirk Müller	(Germany) No. 6 HRT Ford Performance	10^{1}		9^{1}								(2)
—	(Germany) Markus Winkelhock	(Germany) No. 15 Scherer Sport PHX	8^{1}										(1)
—	(Germany) Christopher Haase	(Germany) No. 15 Scherer Sport PHX			8^{1}	Ret	WD						(1)
—	(Germany) David Schumacher	(Germany) No. 6 HRT Ford Performance	10^{1}										(1)
—	(Germany) Maximilian Paul (United States) Danny Soufi	(Austria) No. 7 Konrad Motorsport	Ret										—
—	(India) Arjun Maini	(Germany) No. 2 HRT Ford Performance	DNS		WD								—
—	(Germany) Nico Bastian	(Germany) No. 2 HRT Ford Performance	DNS										—
Pos.	Driver	Team	NLS1	NLS2	NLS3	24H-Q		NLS6	NLS7	NLS8	NLS9	NLS10	Points

‡: Result not counted for classification

Colour	Result
Gold	Winner
Silver	Second place
Bronze	Third place
Green	Points classification
Blue	Non-points classification
Blue	Non-classified finish (NC)
Purple	Retired, not classified (Ret)
Red	Did not qualify (DNQ)
Red	Did not pre-qualify (DNPQ)
Black	Disqualified (DSQ)
White	Did not start (DNS)
White	Withdrew (WD)
White	Race cancelled (C)
Blank	Did not practice (DNP)
Blank	Did not arrive (DNA)
Blank	Excluded (EX)

====== Pro-Am ======
Pos.	Driver	Team	NLS1	NLS2	NLS3	24H-Q		NLS6	NLS7	NLS8	NLS9	NLS10	Points
1	(Germany) Alexey Veremenko (Germany) "Selv"	(Lithuania) No. 8 Juta Racing	2^{4}	1^{11}		2^{6}	Ret	DNS	Ret	1^{4}	2^{2}	2^{3}	30
3	(Germany) Frank Stippler	(Lithuania) No. 8 Juta Racing	2^{4}	1^{11} ‡		2^{6}	Ret	DNS	Ret	1^{4} ‡		2^{3} ‡	10 (28)
4	(Germany) Ben Dörr	(Germany) No. 69 Dörr Motorsport	DSQ		1^{8}								8
Non-championship entries
—	(Norway) Anders Buchardt	(Germany) No. 34 Walkenhorst Motorsport							1^{4}	2^{3}	1^{3}		(19)
—	(Norway) Anders Buchardt	(Germany) No. 35 Walkenhorst Motorsport		3^{6}		Ret	3^{3}						(19)
—	(Norway) Anders Buchardt	(Germany) No. 36 Walkenhorst Motorsport			Ret								(19)
—	(Netherlands) Roelof Bruins (South Korea) Kim Jongkyum	(South Korea) No. 30 (Note: Entered as No. 55 for the N24 Qualifiers) Hankook Competition		Ret	3^{4}	1^{8}	2^{4}					Ret	(16)
—	(Germany) Marco Holzer	(South Korea) No. 30 Hankook Competition		Ret	3^{4}	1^{8}	2^{4}						(16)
—	(Canada) Steven Cho	(South Korea) No. 30 Hankook Competition			3^{4}	1^{8}	2^{4}					Ret	(16)
—	(Netherlands) "Daan Arrow" (Germany) Ben Bünnagel	(Germany) No. 48 Black Falcon Team EAE	1^{6}	Ret		Ret	1^{6}	1^{3}					(15)
—	(Italy) Gabriele Piana	(Germany) No. 48 Black Falcon Team EAE	1^{6}			Ret	1^{6}	1^{3}					(15)
—	(Germany) Patrick Assenheimer	(Germany) No. 6 HRT Ford Performance		2^{8}									(12)
—	(Germany) Patrick Assenheimer	(Germany) No. 9 HRT Ford Performance										1^{4}	(12)
—	(Norway) Christian Krognes	(Germany) No. 34 Walkenhorst Motorsport	DSQ						1^{4}	2^{3}	1^{3}		(10)
—	(Norway) Christian Krognes	(Germany) No. 36 Walkenhorst Motorsport	DSQ		Ret								(10)
—	(Ecuador) Mateo Villagomez	(Germany) No. 34 Walkenhorst Motorsport							1^{4}	2^{3}	1^{3}		(10)
—	(Germany) Mike Stursberg	(Germany) No. 48 Black Falcon Team EAE	1^{6}	Ret				1^{3}					(9)
—	(Germany) Phil Dörr	(Germany) No. 69 Dörr Motorsport	DSQ		1^{8}								(8)
—	(Germany) Dennis Fetzer (Germany) Salman Owega (Germany) David Schumacher	(Germany) No. 6 HRT Ford Performance		2^{8}									(8)
—	(Turkey) Mustafa Mehmet Kaya	(Germany) No. 48 Black Falcon Team EAE		Ret		Ret	1^{6}						(6)
—	(Germany) Elia Erhart	(Lithuania) No. 8 Juta Racing				2^{6}	Ret						(6)
—	(Germany) Jay Mo Härtling (Germany) Kenneth Heyer (Germany) Jannes Fittje	(Germany) No. 11 SR Motorsport by Schnitzelalm			2^{6}								(6)
—	(Germany) Nico Hantke	(Germany) No. 35 Walkenhorst Motorsport		3^{6}									(6)
—	(Switzerland) Alex Fontana (Armenia) Artur Goroyan	(Germany) No. 44 Car Collection Motorsport							2^{3}	3^{2}			(5)
—	(Switzerland) Fabio Scherer	(Germany) No. 9 HRT Ford Performance										1^{4}	(4)
—	(Sweden) Oliver Söderström	(Germany) No. 35 Walkenhorst Motorsport				Ret	3^{3}						(3)
—	(Zimbabwe) Axcil Jefferies (France) Thomas Neubauer (South Africa) David Perel	(Japan) No. 45 Realize Kondo Racing with Rinaldi			4^{3}								(3)
—	(Germany) Peter Elkmann (United States) Danny Soufi	(Austria) No. 7 Konrad Motorsport		Ret									—
—	(Germany) Stefan Aust	(Germany) No. 36 Walkenhorst Motorsport			Ret								—
—	(Germany) Nico Bastian (Germany) Marek Böckmann (France) Steven Palette	(Germany) No. 37 PROsport-Racing				Ret	WD						—
—	(Germany) Marco Seefried	(South Korea) No. 30 Hankook Competition										Ret	—
—	(Germany) Henry Walkenhorst	(Germany) No. 36 Walkenhorst Motorsport	DSQ										—
Pos.	Driver	Team	NLS1	NLS2	NLS3	24H-Q		NLS6	NLS7	NLS8	NLS9	NLS10	Points

‡: Result not counted for classification

Colour	Result
Gold	Winner
Silver	Second place
Bronze	Third place
Green	Points classification
Blue	Non-points classification
Blue	Non-classified finish (NC)
Purple	Retired, not classified (Ret)
Red	Did not qualify (DNQ)
Red	Did not pre-qualify (DNPQ)
Black	Disqualified (DSQ)
White	Did not start (DNS)
White	Withdrew (WD)
White	Race cancelled (C)
Blank	Did not practice (DNP)
Blank	Did not arrive (DNA)
Blank	Excluded (EX)

====== Am ======
Pos.	Driver	Team	NLS1	NLS2	NLS3	24H-Q		NLS6	NLS7	NLS8	NLS9	NLS10	Points
1	(Germany) Christoph Breuer (Thailand) Kiki Sak Nana (Germany) Dieter Schmidtmann	(Thailand) No. 786 Renazzo Motorsport Team	Ret	Ret	2^{2}			1^{4}	2^{4}	Ret	1^{6}	1^{3}	19
4	(Germany) Michael Heimrich (Germany) Arno Klasen	(Germany) No. 50 équipe vitesse	Ret	1^{4}	1^{3}	Ret	2^{2}	DSQ	3^{3}	2^{4}	3^{3}	(2^{2})	19 (21)
6	(Italy) Lorenzo Rocco di Torrepadula	(Germany) No. 50 équipe vitesse		1^{4}		Ret	2^{2}					2^{2}	8
7	(Germany) Sascha Steinhardt	(Germany) No. 50 équipe vitesse									3^{3}		3
Non-championship entries
—	(Turkey) Mustafa Mehmet Kaya (Germany) Mike Stursberg	(Germany) No. 48 Black Falcon Team EAE							1^{6}	1^{6}			(12)
—	(Germany) Tobias Müller	(Germany) No. 48 Black Falcon Team EAE							1^{6}				(6)
—	(Germany) Ben Bünnagel	(Germany) No. 48 Black Falcon Team EAE								1^{6}			(6)
—	(Sweden) Eric Ullström	(Germany) No. 50 équipe vitesse			1^{3}	Ret	2^{2}	DSQ					(5)
—	(Germany) Klaus Abbelen	(Germany) No. 21 Frikadelli Racing Team							Ret	Ret	2^{4}		(4)
—	(Germany) Christian Bollrath	(Germany) No. 36 (Note: Entered as No. 30 for the N24 Qualifiers) Walkenhorst Motorsport		NC		Ret	1^{3}						(3)
—	(Germany) Henry Walkenhorst	(Germany) No. 36 Walkenhorst Motorsport				Ret	1^{3}						(3)
—	(Germany) Thomas Mutsch	(Thailand) No. 786 Renazzo Motorsport Team			2^{2}								(2)
—	(Germany) Thomas Kiefer (Germany) Joachim Thyssen (Germany) Hans Wehrmann	(Germany) No. 25 Huber Motorsport									4^{2}		(2)
—	(Germany) Stefan Aust (Germany) Jörg Breuer	(Germany) No. 36 Walkenhorst Motorsport		NC									—
Pos.	Driver	Team	NLS1	NLS2	NLS3	24H-Q		NLS6	NLS7	NLS8	NLS9	NLS10	Points

‡: Result not counted for classification

Colour	Result
Gold	Winner
Silver	Second place
Bronze	Third place
Green	Points classification
Blue	Non-points classification
Blue	Non-classified finish (NC)
Purple	Retired, not classified (Ret)
Red	Did not qualify (DNQ)
Red	Did not pre-qualify (DNPQ)
Black	Disqualified (DSQ)
White	Did not start (DNS)
White	Withdrew (WD)
White	Race cancelled (C)
Blank	Did not practice (DNP)
Blank	Did not arrive (DNA)
Blank	Excluded (EX)

===== SP10 =====
Pos.	Driver	Team	NLS1	NLS2	NLS3	24H-Q		NLS6	NLS7	NLS8	NLS9	NLS10	Points
1	(United Kingdom) Toby Goodman (Finland) Philip Miemois (Germany) Moritz Oberheim	(Germany) No. 165 AVIA W&S Motorsport	2^{8}	1^{6}	Ret			1^{10}	4^{4}	1^{11}	1^{4}		43
4	(Germany) Michel Albers	(Germany) No. 175 PROsport-Racing	3^{6}			1^{6}	1^{6}	2^{8}					26
5	(Japan) Takayuki Kinoshita (Germany) Michael Tischner	(Germany) No. 170 Toyo Tires with Ring Racing	4^{4}	3^{3}	1^{8}	3^{3}	2^{4}						22
7	(Germany) Stephan Brodmerkel	(Germany) No. 164 W&S Motorsport	5^{3}	2^{4}	2^{6}			5^{3}	Ret	4^{4}	Ret		20
8	(Germany) Yannick Himmels	(Germany) No. 175 PROsport-Racing	3^{6}			1^{6}	1^{6}						18
9	(Germany) Jürgen Vöhringer	(Germany) No. 164 W&S Motorsport	5^{3}	2^{4}	2^{6}				Ret	4^{4}			17
10	(Switzerland) Ranko Mijatovic (Germany) Tobias Wahl (Germany) Nick Wüstenhagen	(Germany) No. 187 FK Performance Motorsport	1^{11}										11
13	(United Kingdom) Harry Barton	(United Kingdom) No. 180 Barton Racing	6^{2}										2
Non-championship entries
—	(Romania) Alexandru Vasilescu	(Germany) No. 162 (Note: Entered as No. 67 for the N24 Qualifiers) AV Racing by Black Falcon			3^{4}	2^{4}	3^{3}						(27)
—	(Romania) Alexandru Vasilescu	(Germany) No. 163 AV Racing by Black Falcon						3^{5}	1^{11}				(27)
—	(Germany) Jörg Viebahn	(Germany) No. 175 PROsport-Racing	3^{6}					2^{8}	3^{6}	Ret	Ret		(20)
—	(United States) Judson Holt (United States) Denny Stripling	(Germany) No. 163 AV Racing by Black Falcon							1^{11}	2^{8}			(19)
—	(Sweden) Markus Lönnroth	(Germany) No. 191 (Note: Entered as No. 74 for the N24 Qualifiers) Walkenhorst Motorsport						4^{4}					(18)
—	(Sweden) Markus Lönnroth	(Germany) No. 191 PROsport-Racing							2^{8}	3^{6}			(18)
—	(Germany) Heiko Tönges	(Germany) No. 170 Toyo Tires with Ring Racing	4^{4}	3^{3}	1^{8}	3^{3}	2^{4}						(18)
—	(Chile) Benjamín Hites	(Germany) No. 175 PROsport-Racing						2^{8}	3^{6}		Ret		(14)
—	(Sweden) Patrick Skoog	(Germany) No. 191 PROsport-Racing							2^{8}	3^{6}			(14)
—	(United States) Ryan Harrison	(Germany) No. 163 AV Racing by Black Falcon						3^{5}		2^{8}			(13)
—	(Germany) Marek Böckmann	(Germany) No. 175 PROsport-Racing				1^{6}	1^{6}						(12)
—	(Germany) Hendrik Still	(Germany) No. 164 W&S Motorsport	5^{3}		2^{6}			5^{3}			Ret		(12)
—	(Germany) Niclas Wiedemann	(Germany) No. 164 W&S Motorsport		2^{4}					Ret	4^{4}			(8)
—	(United States) Benjamin Koslowski	(Germany) No. 162 AV Racing by Black Falcon				2^{4}	3^{3}						(7)
—	(Sweden) Peter Larsen (Sweden) Johan Rosen	(Sweden) No. 190 (Audi R8 LMS GT4)							5^{3}	5^{3}			(6)
—	(United States) Charles Espenlaub	(Germany) No. 163 AV Racing by Black Falcon						3^{5}					(5)
—	(Germany) Axel König (Germany) Norbert Schneider	(Germany) No. 162 AV Racing by Black Falcon			3^{4}								(4)
—	(Germany) Niklas Abrahamsen	(Germany) No. 191 Walkenhorst Motorsport		Ret	Ret			4^{4}					(4)
—	(United Kingdom) Jack James	(Germany) No. 191 Walkenhorst Motorsport						4^{4}					(4)
—	(Belgium) Aris Balanian	(Germany) No. 191 Walkenhorst Motorsport		Ret		4^{2}	4^{2}						(4)
—	(United States) Joshua Joseph Hansen	(Germany) No. 191 Walkenhorst Motorsport			Ret	4^{2}	4^{2}						(4)
—	(France) Jean-Christophe David	(Germany) No. 191 Walkenhorst Motorsport				4^{2}	4^{2}						(4)
—	(Germany) Leon Wassertheurer	(Germany) No. 162 AV Racing by Black Falcon				NC	3^{3}						(3)
—	(Germany) Luca Link	(United Kingdom) No. 180 Barton Racing	6^{2}										(2)
—	(Germany) Hermann Vortkamp	(Germany) No. 191 Walkenhorst Motorsport		Ret	Ret								—
—	(United States) Christoph Koslowski	(Germany) No. 162 AV Racing by Black Falcon				NC	NC						—
—	(Austria) Raphael Rennhofer	(Germany) No. 175 PROsport-Racing									Ret		—
—	(Austria) Constantin Schöll	(Germany) No. 164 W&S Motorsport									Ret		—
Pos.	Driver	Team	NLS1	NLS2	NLS3	24H-Q		NLS6	NLS7	NLS8	NLS9	NLS10	Points

Colour	Result
Gold	Winner
Silver	Second place
Bronze	Third place
Green	Points classification
Blue	Non-points classification
Blue	Non-classified finish (NC)
Purple	Retired, not classified (Ret)
Red	Did not qualify (DNQ)
Red	Did not pre-qualify (DNPQ)
Black	Disqualified (DSQ)
White	Did not start (DNS)
White	Withdrew (WD)
White	Race cancelled (C)
Blank	Did not practice (DNP)
Blank	Did not arrive (DNA)
Blank	Excluded (EX)

===== NLS CUP2 =====
Pos.	Driver	Team	NLS1	NLS2	NLS3	24H-Q		NLS6	NLS7	NLS8	NLS9	NLS10	Points
1	(Germany) Arne Hoffmeister (Germany) Tim Scheerbarth	(Belgium) No. 921 Mühlner Motorsport	1^{15}	1^{15}	1^{15}	1^{15}	(6^{3})	1^{19}	(2^{11})	(2^{11})	1^{15}	1^{15}	109 (134)
3	(Germany) Noah Nagelsdiek (Luxembourg) Carlos Rivas	(Germany) No. 948 48 LOSCH Motorsport by Black Falcon	2^{11}	2^{11}	2^{11}	Ret	WD	2^{14}	1^{15}	1^{15}	2^{11}	Ret	88
3	(Germany) Tobias Müller	(Germany) No. 948 48 LOSCH Motorsport by Black Falcon	2^{11}	2^{11}	2^{11}			2^{14}	1^{15}	1^{15}	2^{11}	Ret	88
6	(Germany) Fabio Grosse (Switzerland) Patrik Grütter	(Germany) No. 901 SRS Team Sorg Rennsport	3^{8}	(12^{1})	(5^{4})	(5^{4})	2^{11}	5^{5}	3^{8}	3^{8}	3^{8}	2^{11}	59 (68)
8	(Germany) Fidel Leib	(Germany) No. 909 KKrämer Racing								5^{4}	4^{6}	5^{4}	56 (57)
8	(Germany) Fidel Leib	(Germany) No. 929 KKrämer Racing	Ret	3^{8}	(10^{1})	2^{11}	1^{15}	4^{8}	Ret				56 (57)
9	(Germany) Alexander Hardt (United States) Peter Ludwig (Germany) Maik Rosenberg	(Germany) No. 900 Black Falcon Team ZIMMERMANN	4^{6}	4^{6}	4^{6}			6^{4}	4^{6}	4^{6}	(5^{4})	3^{8}	42 (46)
12	(Ukraine) Oleksiy Kikireshko	(Germany) No. 901 SRS Team Sorg Rennsport	3^{8}	12^{1}	5^{4}	5^{4}	2^{11}						35 (36)
12	(Ukraine) Oleksiy Kikireshko	(Germany) No. 905 PTerting Sports by Up2Race										4^{6}	35 (36)
12	(Ukraine) Oleksiy Kikireshko	(Germany) No. 917 Raceworxx Automotive						12^{1}			(12^{1})		35 (36)
13	(Germany) Sascha Steinhardt	(Germany) No. 912 KKrämer Racing	5^{4}	Ret	13^{1}								31
13	(Germany) Sascha Steinhardt	(Germany) No. 929 KKrämer Racing				2^{11}	1^{15}						31
14	(Germany) Tobias Vazquez-Garcia	(Germany) No. 909 KKrämer Racing								5^{4}	4^{6}	5^{4}	31
14	(Germany) Tobias Vazquez-Garcia	(Germany) No. 929 KKrämer Racing	Ret	3^{8}	10^{1}			4^{8}	Ret				31
15	(Germany) Karsten Krämer	(Germany) No. 909 KKrämer Racing						7^{3}	8^{1}			5^{4}	28
15	(Germany) Karsten Krämer	(Germany) No. 912 KKrämer Racing	5^{4}	Ret	13^{1}								28
15	(Germany) Karsten Krämer	(Germany) No. 929 KKrämer Racing				NC	1^{15}						28
16	(Germany) Kersten Jodexnis	(Germany) No. 919 ClickversicherungTeam	DSQ	5^{4}	9^{1}	3^{8}	3^{8}	(9^{1})	NC	6^{3}	6^{3}		27 (28)
17	(Germany) Michele di Martino	(Germany) No. 909 KKrämer Racing	DSQ	6^{3}	3^{8}	DNS	Ret		8^{1}				24
17	(Germany) Michele di Martino	(Germany) No. 929 KKrämer Racing						4^{8}	5^{4}				24
18	(Germany) Christopher Brück	(Germany) No. 909 KKrämer Racing	DSQ	6^{3}	3^{8}	DNS	Ret						19
18	(Germany) Christopher Brück	(Germany) No. 929 KKrämer Racing						4^{8}	Ret				19
19	(Germany) Alex Koch	(Germany) No. 910 Smyrlis Racing	6^{3}	10^{1}	6^{3}			(10^{1})	6^{3}	7^{2}	7^{2}	6^{3}	17 (18)
20	(Germany) Richard-Sven Karl Jodexnis	(Germany) No. 919 ClickversicherungTeam				3^{8}	3^{8}	9^{1} ‡					16 (17)
21	(Germany) Klaus Koch	(Germany) No. 910 Smyrlis Racing	6^{3}	10^{1}				10^{1}	6^{3}	7^{2}	7^{2}	6^{3}	15
22	(Netherlands) Jan Jaap van Roon	(Germany) No. 927 Max Kruse Racing		8^{1}	7^{2}						Ret		3
23	(Germany) Alexander Fielenbach	(Germany) No. 917 Raceworxx Automotive						12^{1}					1
Non-championship entries
—	(Germany) David Jahn	(Belgium) No. 921 Mühlner Motorsport	1^{15}	1^{15}	1^{15}	1^{15}	6^{3}	1^{19}	2^{11}	2^{11}	1^{15}	1^{15}	(134)
—	(Germany) Robin Chrzanowski	(Germany) No. 919 ClickversicherungTeam	DSQ	5^{4}	9^{1}	3^{8}	3^{8}	9^{1}	NC	6^{3}	6^{3}		(28)
—	(Slovakia) Antal Zsigo	(Belgium) No. 904 Mühlner Motorsport	7^{2}	7^{2}	8^{1}	6^{3}	4^{6}		5^{4}	Ret	9^{1}	7^{2}	(21)
—	(Germany) Janis Waldow	(Belgium) No. 904 Mühlner Motorsport				6^{3}	4^{6}	3^{10}					(19)
—	(Germany) Niklas Koch	(Germany) No. 910 Smyrlis Racing	6^{3}	10^{1}	6^{3}			10^{1}	6^{3}	7^{2}	7^{2}	6^{3}	(18)
—	(France) Leo Messenger	(Germany) No. 909 KKrämer Racing						7^{3}			4^{6}	5^{4}	(13)
—	(France) Leo Messenger	(Germany) No. 929 KKrämer Racing							Ret				(13)
—	(Germany) Ben Bünnagel	(Belgium) No. 904 Mühlner Motorsport						3^{10}			9^{1}		(11)
—	(Ukraine) Ivan Peklin	(Belgium) No. 904 Mühlner Motorsport						3^{10}					(10)
—	(Germany) Peter Sander	(Germany) No. 909 KKrämer Racing						7^{3}	8^{1}	5^{4}			(10)
—	(Germany) Peter Sander	(Germany) No. 912 KKrämer Racing				Ret	7^{2}						(10)
—	(Germany) Ralf-Peter Bonk (Netherlands) Marco van Ramshorst	(Germany) No. 906 pb performance		9^{1}	12^{1}	Ret	5^{4}	9^{1}			10^{1}	8^{1}	(9)
—	(Germany) Peter Scharmach	(Germany) No. 919 ClickversicherungTeam	DSQ	5^{4}	9^{1}				NC	6^{3}			(8)
—	(Germany) Nico Bastian	(Germany) No. 905 PTerting Sports by Up2Race										4^{6}	(7)
—	(Germany) Nico Bastian	(Germany) No. 917 Raceworxx Automotive									12^{1}		(7)
—	(United States) Christopher Allen (United States) Robert Mau (United States) Jon Miller	(Germany) No. 925 Huber Motorsport				4^{6}	Ret						(6)
—	(Estonia) Martin Rump	(Belgium) No. 904 Mühlner Motorsport		7^{2}					5^{4}	Ret			(6)
—	(Germany) Marcel Hoppe	(Belgium) No. 904 Mühlner Motorsport	7^{2}	7^{2}	8^{1}						9^{1}		(6)
—	(Netherlands) Jeroen Bleekemolen	(Belgium) No. 904 Mühlner Motorsport							5^{4}	Ret			(4)
—	(United Kingdom) Bill Cameron (United Kingdom) Jim Cameron	(United Kingdom) No. 913 Team Cameron	Ret		DNS				7^{2}	8^{1}	11^{1}		(4)
—	(Germany) Florian Naumann	(Germany) No. 909 KKrämer Racing						7^{3}					(3)
—	(Germany) Ioannis Smyrlis	(Germany) No. 910 Smyrlis Racing										6^{3}	(3)
—	(Netherlands) Tom Coronel	(Germany) No. 927 Max Kruse Racing		8^{1}	7^{2}						Ret		(3)
—	(United States) Ace Robey	(Germany) No. 912 KKrämer Racing			13^{1}	Ret	7^{2}						(3)
—	(Germany) Michael Rebhan	(Belgium) No. 904 Mühlner Motorsport	7^{2}										(2)
—	(Netherlands) Rudy van Buren	(Germany) No. 927 Max Kruse Racing			7^{2}								(2)
—	(Germany) Felipe Fernández Laser	(Belgium) No. 904 Mühlner Motorsport										7^{2}	(2)
—	(Germany) Tim Heinemann	(Germany) No. 917 Raceworxx Automotive						12^{1}			12^{1}		(2)
—	(United States) Ryan Harrison (Romania) Alexandru Vasilescu (Germany) Leon Wassertheurer	(Germany) No. 902 AV Racing by Black Falcon									8^{1}		(1)
—	(Germany) Marius Kiefer (Germany) Stefan Kiefer (Austria) Luca Rettenbacher	(Germany) No. 930 Sante Royale Racing Team		11^{1}									(1)
—	(Germany) Nick Salewsky	(Belgium) No. 904 Mühlner Motorsport			8^{1}								(1)
—	(Germany) Jürgen Oehler	(Germany) No. 910 Smyrlis Racing						10^{1}					(1)
—	(Sweden) Niclas Jönsson (United States) Tracy Krohn	(Germany) No. 935 RPM Racing		NC	11^{1}								(1)
—	(Germany) Georg Goder (Germany) Ralf Oehme (Germany) Martin Schlüter	(Germany) No. 920 9und11 Racing						11^{1}					(1)
—	(Germany) Guido Tönnessen	(Germany) No. 912 KKrämer Racing				Ret	NC						—
Pos.	Driver	Team	NLS1	NLS2	NLS3	24H-Q		NLS6	NLS7	NLS8	NLS9	NLS10	Points

‡: Result not counted for classification

Colour	Result
Gold	Winner
Silver	Second place
Bronze	Third place
Green	Points classification
Blue	Non-points classification
Blue	Non-classified finish (NC)
Purple	Retired, not classified (Ret)
Red	Did not qualify (DNQ)
Red	Did not pre-qualify (DNPQ)
Black	Disqualified (DSQ)
White	Did not start (DNS)
White	Withdrew (WD)
White	Race cancelled (C)
Blank	Did not practice (DNP)
Blank	Did not arrive (DNA)
Blank	Excluded (EX)

===== NLS CUP3 =====
Pos.	Driver	Team	NLS1	NLS2	NLS3	24H-Q		NLS6	NLS7	NLS8	NLS9	NLS10	Points
1	(Germany) Heiko Eichenberg (United Kingdom) Harley Haughton	(Germany) No. 959 SRS Team Sorg Rennsport	1^{15}	1^{15}	DNS	1^{15}	1^{15}	8^{1}	1^{15}	Ret	2^{11}	Ret	87
3	(Germany) Joshua Bednarski (Germany) Lorenz Stegmann	(Germany) No. 962 W&S Motorsport	13^{1}	Ret	1^{15}			1^{19}	2^{11}	3^{8}	1^{15}	1^{15}	84
5	(Germany) Leonard Oehme (Germany) Moritz Oehme	(Germany) No. 944 Team 9und11	DSQ	4^{6}	Ret			2^{14}	3^{8}	1^{15}	3^{8}	3^{8}	59
7	(Norway) Oskar Sandberg	(Germany) No. 940 Adrenalin Motorsport Team Mainhattan Wheels	2^{11}	2^{11}	Ret	2^{11}	2^{11}	Ret	4^{6}	Ret		12^{1}	51
8	(United States) Nico Silva	(Germany) No. 940 Adrenalin Motorsport Team Mainhattan Wheels	2^{11}	2^{11}	Ret	2^{11}	2^{11}	Ret	4^{6}	DSQ			50
9	(Germany) Horst Baumann	(Germany) No. 950 Schmickler Performance powered by Ravenol	3^{8}	6^{3}	3^{8}			3^{10}	5^{4}	2^{11}	4^{6}	(13^{1})	50 (51)
10	(Germany) Kai Riemer	(Belgium) No. 939 Mühlner Motorsport										2^{11}	38
10	(Germany) Kai Riemer	(Germany) No. 962 W&S Motorsport	13^{1}	Ret	1^{15}				2^{11}	DSQ			38
11	(Germany) Nick Deißler (Germany) Aaron Wenisch	(Germany) No. 941 Adrenalin Motorsport Team Mainhattan Wheels	5^{4}	(8^{1})	5^{4}	(9^{1})	3^{8}	5^{5}	(6^{3})	4^{6}	5^{4}	4^{6}	37 (42)
13	(Germany) Stefan Kruse	(Germany) No. 941 Adrenalin Motorsport Team Mainhattan Wheels	5^{4}	(8^{1})	5^{4}			5^{5}	6^{3}	4^{6}	5^{4}	4^{6}	32 (33)
14	(Austria) David Griessner	(Germany) No. 940 Adrenalin Motorsport Team Mainhattan Wheels	2^{11}	2^{11}	Ret			Ret					22
15	(United Kingdom) Joshua Hislop	(Germany) No. 949 SRS Team Sorg Rennsport						6^{4}					22
15	(United Kingdom) Joshua Hislop	(Germany) No. 969 SRS Team Sorg Rennsport	4^{6}	7^{2}	7^{2}				Ret	5^{4}	Ret	5^{4}	22
16	(Germany) Tim Lukas Müller	(Germany) No. 940 Adrenalin Motorsport Team Mainhattan Wheels										(12^{1})	21 (23)
16	(Germany) Tim Lukas Müller	(Germany) No. 949 SRS Team Sorg Rennsport									(8^{1})		21 (23)
16	(Germany) Tim Lukas Müller	(Germany) No. 977 EiFelkind Racing	7^{2}	Ret	10^{1}	3^{8}	4^{6}	9^{1}	8^{1}	7^{2}			21 (23)
17	(Germany) Franz Linden (Germany) Rüdiger Schicht	(Germany) No. 955 Team Speedworxx	15^{1}	5^{4}	14^{1}			4^{8}	Ret	Ret	6^{3}	8^{1}	18
19	(Germany) Jan-Niklas Stieler	(Germany) No. 949 SRS Team Sorg Rennsport	9^{1}					6^{4}					17
19	(Germany) Jan-Niklas Stieler	(Germany) No. 969 SRS Team Sorg Rennsport		7^{2}	7^{2}				Ret	5^{4}	Ret	5^{4}	17
20	(Germany) Yannik Himmels	(Belgium) No. 939 Mühlner Motorsport						7^{3}	11^{1}	8^{1}	Ret	2^{11}	16
21	(Austria) Bernhard Wagner	(Germany) No. 949 SRS Team Sorg Rennsport	9^{1}									6^{3}	14 (16)
21	(Austria) Bernhard Wagner	(Germany) No. 969 SRS Team Sorg Rennsport						11^{1}					14 (16)
21	(Austria) Bernhard Wagner	(Germany) No. 979 SRS Team Sorg Rennsport		13^{1}	11^{1}	6^{3}	5^{4}		(13^{1})	(11^{1})			14 (16)
22	(Germany) Stefan Beyer	(Germany) No. 949 SRS Team Sorg Rennsport	9^{1}	9^{1}	4^{6}				Ret	Ret	8^{1}	6^{3}	12
23	(Germany) René Höber (Germany) Richard-Sven Karl Jodexnis (Germany) Christoph Krombach	(Germany) No. 982 W&S Motorsport	6^{3}	10^{1}	9^{1}			10^{1}	9^{1}	6^{3}	7^{2}	Ret	12
26	(Germany) Alexander Müller	(Germany) No. 979 SRS Team Sorg Rennsport	12^{1}	13^{1}	11^{1}	6^{3}	5^{4}						10
27	(Germany) Alexander Fielenbach	(Germany) No. 955 Team Speedworxx	15^{1}	5^{4}	14^{1}			4^{8} ‡	Ret	Ret	6^{3}		9 (17)
28	(Germany) Markus Nölken	(Thailand) No. 945 Renazzo Motorsport Team	8^{1}	12^{1}		8^{1}	6^{3}	12^{1}			10^{1}		8
29	(Germany) Desiree Müller	(Germany) No. 977 EiFelkind Racing	7^{2}	Ret	10^{1}			9^{1}	8^{1}	7^{2}			7
30	(Germany) Oliver Kunz	(Germany) No. 961 W&S Motorsport	WD	14^{1}	12^{1}			14^{1}	12^{1}	9^{1}		10^{1}	6
31	(Germany) Otto Klohs	(Thailand) No. 945 Renazzo Motorsport Team	8^{1}	12^{1}					10^{1}	9^{1}			4
Non-championship entries
—	(Germany) Markus Schmickler (Germany) Stefan Schmickler	(Germany) No. 950 Schmickler Performance powered by Ravenol	3^{8}	6^{3}	3^{8}			3^{10}	5^{4}	2^{11}	4^{6}	13^{1}	(51)
—	(Germany) Janis Waldow	(Belgium) No. 939 Mühlner Motorsport	10^{1}	3^{8}	2^{11}				11^{1}	8^{1}			(23)
—	(Germany) Janis Waldow	(Thailand) No. 945 Renazzo Motorsport Team										9^{1}	(23)
—	(Germany) Nico Bastian	(Belgium) No. 939 Mühlner Motorsport		3^{8}	2^{11}								(19)
—	(Sweden) Tommy Gräberg	(Germany) No. 969 SRS Team Sorg Rennsport	4^{6}	7^{2}	7^{2}				Ret	5^{4}	Ret	5^{4}	(18)
—	(Latvia) Kasparas Vingilis	(Germany) No. 949 SRS Team Sorg Rennsport		9^{1}	4^{6}			6^{4}	Ret	Ret	8^{1}	6^{3}	(15)
—	(Germany) Thomas Ardelt (Germany) Henning Hausmeier	(Germany) No. 977 EiFelkind Racing				3^{8}	4^{6}						(14)
—	(France) Leo Messenger	(Germany) No. 941 Adrenalin Motorsport Team Mainhattan Wheels				9^{1}	3^{8}						(9)
—	(Germany) Maximilian Volz	(Germany) No. 969 SRS Team Sorg Rennsport						11^{1}					(9)
—	(Germany) Maximilian Volz	(Germany) No. 979 SRS Team Sorg Rennsport				6^{3}	5^{4}		13^{1}	11^{1}			(9)
—	(Germany) Kim Berwanger (Germany) Christian Kohlhaas	(Germany) No. 966 asBest Racing	11^{1}	11^{1}	8^{1}			Ret	16^{1}	10^{1}	11^{1}	7^{2}	(8)
—	(Lithuania) Eduardas Klepikas (Lithuania) Gustas Grinbergas	(Belgium) No. 939 Mühlner Motorsport				4^{6}	8^{1}						(7)
—	(Germany) Finn Wiebelhaus	(Germany) No. 979 SRS Team Sorg Rennsport		13^{1}									(7)
—	(Germany) Finn Wiebelhaus	(Germany) No. 949 SRS Team Sorg Rennsport			4^{6}								(7)
—	(Switzerland) Marc Arn	(Germany) No. 977 EiFelkind Racing							8^{1}	7^{2}			(7)
—	(Switzerland) Marc Arn	(Switzerland) No. 999 BSL Racing Team				5^{4}	Ret						(7)
—	(Germany) Heinz Dolfen	(Germany) No. 966 asBest Racing	11^{1}	11^{1}				Ret	16^{1}	10^{1}	11^{1}	7^{2}	(7)
—	(Germany) Yannick Fübrich	(Germany) No. 940 Adrenalin Motorsport Team Mainhattan Wheels							4^{6}	Ret			(6)
—	(Germany) Daniel Nölken	(Thailand) No. 945 Renazzo Motorsport Team				8^{1}	6^{3}	12^{1}			10^{1}		(6)
—	(Germany) Peter Siebert	(Germany) No. 961 W&S Motorsport		14^{1}	12^{1}			14^{1}	12^{1}	9^{1}		10^{1}	(6)
—	(Belgium) Aris Balanian	(Belgium) No. 939 Mühlner Motorsport						7^{3}	11^{1}	8^{1}			(5)
—	(Germany) Philipp Frommenwiler (Switzerland) Marcel Zimmermann	(Switzerland) No. 999 BSL Racing Team				5^{4}	Ret						(4)
—	(United Kingdom) James Breakell (United Kingdom) Martin Rich	(United Kingdom) No. 932 Breakell Racing				7^{2}	7^{2}						(4)
—	(Germany) Lion Düker	(Germany) No. 961 W&S Motorsport						14^{1}	12^{1}		9^{1}	10^{1}	(4)
—	(United States) Ryan Harrison (Switzerland) Boris Hrubesch	(Germany) No. 964 AV Racing by Black Falcon			6^{3}								(3)
—	(Germany) Christopher Rink	(Belgium) No. 939 Mühlner Motorsport						7^{3}					(3)
—	(Germany) Peter Sander	(Germany) No. 978 KKrämer Racing	14^{1}	15^{1}	13^{1}								(3)
—	(United Kingdom) Chris Lulham	(Germany) No. 980 Lionspeed GP						Ret	7^{2}				(2)
—	(Austria) Michael Fischer	(Germany) No. 977 EiFelkind Racing	7^{2}										(2)
—	(Netherlands) Max Verstappen	(Germany) No. 980 Lionspeed GP							7^{2}				(2)
—	(United States) Jake Walker (United States) Jaden Lander	(Germany) No. 949 SRS Team Sorg Rennsport				10^{1}	9^{1}						(2)
—	(Germany) Nils Steinberg	(Thailand) No. 945 Renazzo Motorsport Team							10^{1}	9^{1}			(2)
—	(France) Olivier Baharian (Germany) Carsten Kautz (Luxembourg) Gabriel Rindone	No. 956 (No Entry Name)							14^{1}	12^{1}			(2)
—	(Germany) Otto Blank (Germany) Daniel Schwerfeld (Switzerland) "TAKIS"	(Germany) No. 964 AV Racing by Black Falcon							15^{1}	13^{1}			(2)
—	(Germany) John Lee Schambony	(Germany) No. 966 asBest Racing			8^{1}								(1)
—	(Germany) Erik Braun	(Germany) No. 955 Team Speedworxx										8^{1}	(1)
—	(Germany) Björn Simon	(Germany) No. 949 SRS Team Sorg Rennsport		9^{1}									(1)
—	(Germany) Heiko Hammel	(Thailand) No. 945 Renazzo Motorsport Team										9^{1}	(1)
—	(Germany) Thorsten Jung	(Belgium) No. 939 Mühlner Motorsport	10^{1}										(1)
—	(Germany) Henning Eschweiler	(Germany) No. 979 SRS Team Sorg Rennsport			11^{1}								(1)
—	(United States) Malcolm Harrison (Luxembourg) Chester Kieffer (Netherlands) Flynt Schuring	(Germany) No. 964 AV Racing by Black Falcon										11^{1}	(1)
—	(Norway) Peder Saltvedt	(Germany) No. 940 Adrenalin Motorsport Team Mainhattan Wheels										12^{1}	(1)
—	(United Kingdom) Oliver Allwood	(Germany) No. 978 KKrämer Racing			13^{1}								(1)
—	(Germany) Marco Lamsouguer	(Germany) No. 978 KKrämer Racing						13^{1}			Ret		(1)
—	(Poland) Jacek Pydys	(Germany) No. 978 KKrämer Racing						13^{1}					(1)
—	(Germany) Christian Coen	(Germany) No. 979 SRS Team Sorg Rennsport							13^{1}				(1)
—	(Germany) Jürgen Oehler	(Germany) No. 978 KKrämer Racing	14^{1}										(1)
—	(Germany) Fabian Peitzmeier	(Germany) No. 961 W&S Motorsport		14^{1}									(1)
—	(Germany) John Finken	(Germany) No. 978 KKrämer Racing		15^{1}									(1)
—	(Belgium) Matisse Lismont (United States) Kyle Tilley	(Germany) No. 980 Lionspeed GP						Ret					—
—	(Germany) Etienne Ploenes	(Germany) No. 966 asBest Racing						Ret					—
—	(Germany) Maximilian Eisberg	(Germany) No. 949 SRS Team Sorg Rennsport							Ret	Ret			—
—	(Germany) Andre Duve	(Belgium) No. 939 Mühlner Motorsport									Ret		—
Pos.	Driver	Team	NLS1	NLS2	NLS3	24H-Q		NLS6	NLS7	NLS8	NLS9	NLS10	Points

‡: Result not counted for classification

Colour	Result
Gold	Winner
Silver	Second place
Bronze	Third place
Green	Points classification
Blue	Non-points classification
Blue	Non-classified finish (NC)
Purple	Retired, not classified (Ret)
Red	Did not qualify (DNQ)
Red	Did not pre-qualify (DNPQ)
Black	Disqualified (DSQ)
White	Did not start (DNS)
White	Withdrew (WD)
White	Race cancelled (C)
Blank	Did not practice (DNP)
Blank	Did not arrive (DNA)
Blank	Excluded (EX)

===== SP-Pro =====
Pos.	Driver	Team	NLS1	NLS2	NLS3	24H-Q	NLS6	NLS7	NLS8	NLS9	NLS10	Points
1	(Germany) Andreas Gülden	(Germany) No. 347 Toyo Tires with Ring Racing	1^{2}	Ret	Ret		1^{3}			1^{2}	1^{2}	9
Non-championship entries
—	(Germany) Marc Hennerici	(Germany) No. 347 Toyo Tires with Ring Racing	1^{2}	Ret	Ret		1^{3}			1^{2}	1^{2}	(9)
—	(Germany) Tim Sandtler	(Germany) No. 347 Toyo Tires with Ring Racing	1^{2}	Ret	Ret		1^{3}			1^{2}	NC	(7)
Pos.	Driver	Team	NLS1	NLS2	NLS3	24H-Q	NLS6	NLS7	NLS8	NLS9	NLS10	Points

‡: Result not counted for classification

Colour	Result
Gold	Winner
Silver	Second place
Bronze	Third place
Green	Points classification
Blue	Non-points classification
Blue	Non-classified finish (NC)
Purple	Retired, not classified (Ret)
Red	Did not qualify (DNQ)
Red	Did not pre-qualify (DNPQ)
Black	Disqualified (DSQ)
White	Did not start (DNS)
White	Withdrew (WD)
White	Race cancelled (C)
Blank	Did not practice (DNP)
Blank	Did not arrive (DNA)
Blank	Excluded (EX)

===== SP8T =====
Pos.	Driver	Team	NLS1	NLS2	NLS3	24H-Q		NLS6	NLS7	NLS8	NLS9	NLS10	Points
1	(Switzerland) Ranko Mijatovic (Germany) Nick Wüstenhagen	(Germany) No. 187 FK Performance Motorsport		1^{15}	1^{15}	1^{15}	1^{15}	1^{19}	1^{15}	1^{15}	(1^{15})	(2^{8})	109 (132)
1	(Switzerland) Ranko Mijatovic (Germany) Nick Wüstenhagen	(Germany) No. 188 FK Performance Motorsport				Ret‡	Ret‡						109 (132)
3	(United Kingdom) Steve Alvarez Brown (United Kingdom) Jimmy Broadbent (Netherlands) Misha Charoudin (Germany) Manuel Metzger	(Germany) No. 150 Team Bilstein by Black Falcon	1^{15}	2^{11}	2^{11}	2^{11}	2^{11}	2^{14}				1^{11}	84
7	(Germany) Tobias Wahl	(Germany) No. 187 FK Performance Motorsport		1^{15}	1^{15}	1^{15}	1^{15}	1^{19}					79
7	(Germany) Tobias Wahl	(Germany) No. 188 FK Performance Motorsport				Ret‡	Ret‡						79
8	(Germany) Philipp Gresek (Germany) Richard Gresek	(Germany) No. 155 Plusline Motorsport	4^{6}	(7^{2})	4^{6}	(4^{6})	3^{8}	3^{10}	2^{11}	2^{11}	3^{8}	(3^{6})	60 (74)
10	(Switzerland) Martin Kroll	(Switzerland) No. 189 Hofor Racing by Bonk Motorsport	Ret	(9^{1})	6^{3}	6^{3}	4^{6}	5^{5}	6^{3}	6^{3}	Ret	4^{4}	27 (28)
11	(Germany) Janina Schall	(Singapore) No. 146 Giti Tire Motorsport by WS Racing	Ret	6^{3}	8^{1}				3^{8}	3^{8}	5^{4}		24
12	(Germany) Michel Albers / "Alboretto"	(Germany) No. 175 PROsport-Racing		3^{8}	3^{8}							Ret	16
12	(Germany) Yannick Himmels	(Germany) No. 175 PROsport-Racing		3^{8}	3^{8}								16
Non-championship entries
—	(Germany) Reinhold Renger	(Germany) No. 187 FK Performance Motorsport							1^{15}	1^{15}		2^{8}	(38)
—	(Belgium) Guido Dumarey (Belgium) Maxime Dumarey	(Germany) No. 140 PROsport-Racing	3^{8}	8^{1}	5^{4}			Ret	4^{6}	Ret	6^{3}		(22)
—	(Germany) Michael Bonk	(Switzerland) No. 189 Hofor Racing by Bonk Motorsport	Ret	9^{1}	6^{3}	6^{3}	NC	5^{5}	6^{3}	6^{3}	Ret	4^{4}	(22)
—	(Japan) Yuichi Nakayama	(Germany) No. 160 Toyo Tires with Ring Racing	2^{11}			5^{4}	5^{4}		Ret	Ret			(21)
—	(Japan) Yuichi Nakayama	(Hong Kong) No. 172 KCMG									7^{2}		(21)
—	(Japan) Kazuto Kotaka	(Germany) No. 160 Toyo Tires with Ring Racing	2^{11}			5^{4}	5^{4}						(21)
—	(Japan) Kazuto Kotaka	(Hong Kong) No. 172 KCMG									7^{2}		(21)
—	(Germany) Felix Partl	(Switzerland) No. 188 Hofor Racing by Bonk Motorsport						4^{8}					(17)
—	(Germany) Felix Partl	(Switzerland) No. 189 Hofor Racing by Bonk Motorsport				6^{3}	4^{6}						(17)
—	(Germany) Jörg Viebahn	(Germany) No. 175 PROsport-Racing		3^{8}	3^{8}							Ret	(16)
—	(Liechtenstein) Fabienne Wohlwend	(Singapore) No. 146 Giti Tire Motorsport by WS Racing	Ret						3^{8}	3^{8}			(16)
—	(Japan) Miki Koyama	(Germany) No. 160 Toyo Tires with Ring Racing				5^{4}	5^{4}	6^{4}	Ret	Ret			(14)
—	(Japan) Miki Koyama	(Japan) No. 172 Toyota Gazoo Racing	DSQ		9^{1}								(14)
—	(Japan) Miki Koyama	(Japan) No. 173 Toyota Gazoo Racing	DSQ		7^{2}								(14)
—	(France) Giuliano Alesi	(Germany) No. 160 Toyo Tires with Ring Racing				5^{4}	5^{4}	6^{4}					(14)
—	(France) Giuliano Alesi	(Japan) No. 172 Toyota Gazoo Racing	DSQ		9^{1}								(14)
—	(France) Giuliano Alesi	(Japan) No. 173 Toyota Gazoo Racing	DSQ		7^{2}								(14)
—	(Germany) Maximilian Partl	(Switzerland) No. 188 Hofor Racing by Bonk Motorsport						4^{8}					(12)
—	(Germany) Maximilian Partl	(Switzerland) No. 189 Hofor Racing by Bonk Motorsport		9^{1}	6^{3}			5^{5}					(12)
—	(Germany) Marek Böckmann	(Germany) No. 140 PROsport-Racing						Ret					(11)
—	(Germany) Marek Böckmann	(Germany) No. 191 PROsport-Racing									2^{11}		(11)
—	(Austria) Raphael Rennhofer	(Germany) No. 191 PROsport-Racing									2^{11}		(11)
—	(Netherlands) Beitske Visser	(Singapore) No. 146 Giti Tire Motorsport by WS Racing		6^{3}						3^{8}			(11)
—	(Italy) Edoardo Liberati	(Hong Kong) No. 172 KCMG							5^{4}	4^{6}			(11)
—	(Italy) Edoardo Liberati	(Hong Kong) No. 173 KCMG							7^{2}	5^{4}	8^{1}		(11)
—	(Japan) Shunji Okumoto (Japan) Sho Tsuboi	(Hong Kong) No. 172 KCMG							5^{4}	4^{6}			(10)
—	(Japan) Shunji Okumoto (Japan) Sho Tsuboi	(Hong Kong) No. 173 KCMG							7^{2}	5^{4}			(10)
—	(Germany) Thorsten Wolter	(Switzerland) No. 189 Hofor Racing by Bonk Motorsport				6^{3}	4^{6}						(9)
—	(Germany) Markus Eichele (Germany) Philip Wiskirchen	(Germany) No. 66 ME Motorsport				3^{8}	Ret						(8)
—	(Latvia) Patricija Stalidzane	(Singapore) No. 146 Giti Tire Motorsport by WS Racing							3^{8}				(8)
—	(Germany) Jörg Weidinger	(Switzerland) No. 188 Hofor Racing by Bonk Motorsport						4^{8}					(8)
—	(Germany) Carrie Schreiner	(Singapore) No. 146 Giti Tire Motorsport by WS Racing	Ret	6^{3}	8^{1}						5^{4}		(8)
—	(Japan) Naoya Gamou (Japan) Tatsuya Kataoka (Japan) Takamitsu Matsui (Japan) Masahiro Sasaki	(Japan) No. 110 Toyota Gazoo Rookie Racing		4^{6}									(6)
—	(France) Giuliano Alesi (Japan) Miki Koyama	(Germany) No. 170 Toyo Tires with Ring Racing									4^{6}		(6)
—	(Germany) Rainer Partl	(Switzerland) No. 189 Hofor Racing by Bonk Motorsport		9^{1}								4^{4}	(5)
—	(Canada) Samantha Tan (United States) Neil Verhagen	(Canada) No. 158 ST Racing		5^{4}									(4)
—	(Australia) Michael Bailey	(Switzerland) No. 189 Hofor Racing by Bonk Motorsport								6^{3}	Ret		(3)
—	(Canada) Esteban Masson	(Japan) No. 172 Toyota Gazoo Racing	DSQ		9^{1}								(3)
—	(Canada) Esteban Masson	(Japan) No. 173 Toyota Gazoo Racing	DSQ		7^{2}								(3)
—	(Canada) Esteban Masson	(Hong Kong) No. 173 KCMG									8^{1}		(3)
—	(Germany) Jay Mo Härtling (Germany) Kenneth Heyer (Germany) Tim Neuser	(Germany) No. 144 SR Motorsport by Schnitzelalm										5^{3}	(3)
—	(Japan) Nirei Fukuzumi	(Hong Kong) No. 172 KCMG									7^{2}		(2)
—	(Japan) Nirei Fukuzumi	(Hong Kong) No. 173 KCMG									8^{1}		(2)
—	(United Kingdom) Pippa Mann	(Singapore) No. 146 Giti Tire Motorsport by WS Racing			8^{1}								(1)
—	(Belgium) Alexander Borgmans (Belgium) Maxim De Witte	(Belgium) No. 141 (BMW M235i Racing)			10^{1}								(1)
—	(Chile) Benjamín Hites	(Germany) No. 175 PROsport-Racing										Ret	—
Pos.	Driver	Team	NLS1	NLS2	NLS3	24H-Q		NLS6	NLS7	NLS8	NLS9	NLS10	Points

‡: Result not counted for classification

Colour	Result
Gold	Winner
Silver	Second place
Bronze	Third place
Green	Points classification
Blue	Non-points classification
Blue	Non-classified finish (NC)
Purple	Retired, not classified (Ret)
Red	Did not qualify (DNQ)
Red	Did not pre-qualify (DNPQ)
Black	Disqualified (DSQ)
White	Did not start (DNS)
White	Withdrew (WD)
White	Race cancelled (C)
Blank	Did not practice (DNP)
Blank	Did not arrive (DNA)
Blank	Excluded (EX)

===== SP7 =====
Pos.	Driver	Team	NLS1	NLS2	NLS3	24H-Q		NLS6	NLS7	NLS8	NLS9	NLS10	Points
1	(Germany) Axel Sartingen	(Germany) No. 70 Black Falcon Team ZIMMERMANN	Ret	1^{6}	1^{4}			Ret	1^{8}	Ret	1^{4}	3^{4}	26
2	(Germany) Fabio Sacchi	(Germany) No. 81 tm-racing.org		2^{4}	2^{3}	3^{4}	4^{3}		Ret		2^{3}		17
3	(United Kingdom) Toby Goodman (Finland) Philip Miemois (Germany) Moritz Oberheim	(Germany) No. 165 AVIA W&S Motorsport										1^{8}	8
6	(Germany) Stephan Brodmerkel (Germany) Jürgen Vöhringer	(Germany) No. 164 W&S Motorsport										2^{6}	6
Non-championship entries
—	(Germany) Nils Schwenk	(Germany) No. 70 Black Falcon Team ZIMMERMANN	Ret			1^{8}	3^{4}		1^{8}			3^{4}	(24)
—	(Germany) David Barst	(Germany) No. 70 Black Falcon Team ZIMMERMANN	Ret		1^{4}	1^{8}	3^{4}	Ret		Ret	1^{4}	3^{4}	(24)
—	(Germany) Anton Ruf	(Germany) No. 70 Black Falcon Team ZIMMERMANN		1^{6}		1^{8}	3^{4}	Ret			1^{4}		(22)
—	(Germany) Reiner Neuffer	(Germany) No. 81 tm-racing.org			2^{3}	3^{4}	4^{3}	2^{5}	Ret		2^{3}	4^{3}	(21)
—	(Czech Republic) Milan Kodídek	(Germany) No. 78 RPM Racing			Ret			1^{8}	2^{6}	1^{4}			(18)
—	(Germany) Benedikt Höpfer	(Germany) No. 81 tm-racing.org		2^{4}	2^{3}			2^{5}			2^{3}		(15)
—	(Belgium) Kris Cools	(Germany) No. 78 RPM Racing			Ret			1^{8}	2^{6}				(14)
—	(Germany) Ralf Schall	(Germany) No. 78 RPM Racing						1^{8}	2^{6}				(14)
—	(Germany) Ralf Schall	(Germany) No. 97 (No Entry Name)		Ret									(14)
—	(Switzerland) Philipp Hagnauer (United Kingdom) Alexander Walker	(Switzerland) No. 77 BSL Racing Team		3^{3}		4^{3}	2^{6}						(12)
—	(Germany) Valentin Lachenmayer (Germany) Julian Reeh	(Germany) No. 97 (No Entry Name)		Ret		5^{2}	1^{8}						(10)
—	(Germany) Mark Trompeter	(Germany) No. 97 (No Entry Name)				5^{2}	1^{8}						(10)
—	(Germany) Christoph Ruhrmann	(Switzerland) No. 77 BSL Racing Team				4^{3}	2						(9)
—	(Germany) Mario Farnbacher	(Germany) No. 78 RPM Racing						1^{8}					(8)
—	(Germany) Leon Wassertheurer	(Germany) No. 70 Black Falcon Team ZIMMERMANN						Ret	1^{8}	Ret			(8)
—	(Germany) Lukas Ertl (Germany) Maximilian Ertl (Germany) Stefan Ertl	(Germany) No. 909 KKrämer Racing				2^{6}	5^{2}						(8)
—	(Austria) Constantin Schöll	(Germany) No. 164 W&S Motorsport										2^{6}	(6)
—	(Germany) Paul Hochberger (Germany) Marco Reinbold	(Germany) No. 80 (No Entry Name)							3^{4}	Ret	3^{2}		(6)
—	(Germany) Alexander Kroker	(Germany) No. 81 tm-racing.org						2^{5}					(5)
—	(Germany) Tom Nittel	(Germany) No. 80 (No Entry Name)							3^{4}	Ret			(4)
—	(Germany) Wolf Denis Robin (Germany) Thorsten Lingnau	(Germany) No. 75 (No Entry Name)						3^{4}					(4)
—	(Germany) Tim Breidenbach (Germany) Philip Hamprecht	(Germany) No. 78 RPM Racing								1^{4}			(4)
—	(Germany) Sebastian Brandl	(Germany) No. 81 tm-racing.org					4^{3}						(3)
—	(Germany) Marco Vitonelli	(Germany) No. 81 tm-racing.org										4^{3}	(3)
—	(Germany) Christian Knötschke	(Germany) No. 81 tm-racing.org							Ret				—
—	(United Kingdom) Chris Lulham (Netherlands) Max Verstappen	(Germany) No. 89 Lionspeed GP							Ret				—
—	(Germany) Marek Böckmann (Austria) Raphael Rennhofer (Germany) Hugo Sasse	(Germany) No. 95 PROsport-Racing										Ret	—
Pos.	Driver	Team	NLS1	NLS2	NLS3	24H-Q		NLS6	NLS7	NLS8	NLS9	NLS10	Points

‡: Result not counted for classification

Colour	Result
Gold	Winner
Silver	Second place
Bronze	Third place
Green	Points classification
Blue	Non-points classification
Blue	Non-classified finish (NC)
Purple	Retired, not classified (Ret)
Red	Did not qualify (DNQ)
Red	Did not pre-qualify (DNPQ)
Black	Disqualified (DSQ)
White	Did not start (DNS)
White	Withdrew (WD)
White	Race cancelled (C)
Blank	Did not practice (DNP)
Blank	Did not arrive (DNA)
Blank	Excluded (EX)

===== SP3T =====
Pos.	Driver	Team	NLS1	NLS2	NLS3	24H-Q		NLS6	NLS7	NLS8	NLS9	NLS10	Points
1	(Germany) Maik Rönnefarth	(Germany) No. 312 Schmickler Performance powered by Ravenol	1^{8}	1^{8}	1^{8}			1^{4}			Ret	1^{4}	32
2	(Germany) Claudius Karch	(Germany) No. 312 Schmickler Performance powered by Ravenol	1^{8}	1^{8}	1^{8}								24
3	(Switzerland) Dario Stanco	(Germany) No. 323 Max Kruse Racing	2^{6}			1^{6}	1^{4}	2^{3}			1^{4}		23
4	(Germany) Oliver Kriese	(Germany) No. 300 Ollis Garage Racing	Ret	4^{3}	WD	Ret	WD						3
Non-championship entries
—	(Germany) Achim Wawer	(Germany) No. 312 Schmickler Performance powered by Ravenol	1^{8}	1^{8}	1^{8}			1^{4}			Ret	1^{4}	(32)
—	(Switzerland) Armando Stanco	(Germany) No. 323 Max Kruse Racing	2^{6}			1^{6}	1^{4}	2^{3}			1^{4}		(23)
—	(Netherlands) Filip Hoenjet	No. 308 (No Entry Name)										2^{3}	(17)
—	(Netherlands) Filip Hoenjet	(Armenia) No. 313 Goroyan RT by sharky-racing		3^{4}	2^{6}								(17)
—	(Netherlands) Filip Hoenjet	(Armenia) No. 321 Goroyan RT by sharky-racing	3^{4}										(17)
—	(Germany) Sarah Ganser	(Armenia) No. 313 Goroyan RT by sharky-racing		3^{4}	2^{6}								(10)
—	(Germany) Jens Wulf	No. 308 (No Entry Name)			3^{4}							2^{3}	(10)
—	(Germany) Jens Wulf	(Armenia) No. 321 Goroyan RT by sharky-racing									2^{3}		(10)
—	(Germany) Jens Wulf	(Germany) No. 808 asBest Racing	Ret	WD									(10)
—	(Kyrgyzstan) Oleg Kvitka	(Armenia) No. 314 Goroyan RT by sharky-racing		2^{6}	4^{3}								(9)
—	(Germany) Carsten Knechtges	(Germany) No. 312 Schmickler Performance powered by Ravenol						1^{4}			Ret	1^{4}	(8)
—	(Germany) Moritz Rosenbach	(Armenia) No. 313 Goroyan RT by sharky-racing		3^{4}									(7)
—	(Germany) Moritz Rosenbach	(Armenia) No. 321 Goroyan RT by sharky-racing									2^{3}		(7)
—	(Latvia) Ivars Vallers	(Armenia) No. 321 Goroyan RT by sharky-racing							1^{2}	1^{2}	2^{3}		(7)
—	(Germany) Patrick Steinmetz	(Armenia) No. 314 Goroyan RT by sharky-racing		2^{6}									(6)
—	(Germany) Michael Bräutigam (Belgium) Ugo de Wilde (Belgium) Charles Weerts	(Germany) No. 310 FK Performance Motorsport				2^{4}	3^{2}						(6)
—	(South Korea) Kim Gyumin (South Korea) Kim Youngchan (United States) Jeff Ricca (China) Zhang Zhendong	(South Korea) No. 303 (Note: Entered as No. 832 for the N24 Qualifier Races) Hyundai N Motorsport				3^{3}	2^{3}						(6)
—	(Germany) Constantin Ernst (Germany) Patrick Steinmetz	(Armenia) No. 321 Goroyan RT by sharky-racing	3^{4}										(4)
—	(Germany) Dennis Leißing	No. 308 (No Entry Name)			3^{4}								(4)
—	(Germany) Dennis Leißing	(Germany) No. 808 asBest Racing	Ret										(4)
—	(Germany) Philip Schauerte	No. 308 (No Entry Name)			3^{4}								(4)
—	(Sweden) Mikaela Åhlin-Kottulinsky	(Armenia) No. 321 Goroyan RT by sharky-racing							1^{2}	1^{2}			(4)
—	(Germany) Philipp Eis (Germany) René Steiger	(Armenia) No. 314 Goroyan RT by sharky-racing			4^{3}								(3)
—	(Luxembourg) Gabriel Rindone	(Armenia) No. 321 Goroyan RT by sharky-racing								1^{2}			(2)
—	(Germany) Rudi Speich (Germany) Roland Waschkau	(Germany) No. 311 MSC Sinzig e.V. im ADAC			Ret							Ret	—
—	(Germany) Kim Berwanger	(Germany) No. 808 asBest Racing	Ret										—
—	(Germany) Manuel Lauck (United States) Michael Lewis	(South Korea) No. 303 Hyundai N Motorsport		Ret									—
—	(Germany) Gregor Starck	(Germany) No. 300 Ollis Garage Racing			WD	Ret	WD						—
—	(Germany) Daniel Jenichen	(Germany) No. 311 MSC Sinzig e.V. im ADAC										Ret	—
—	(Germany) Hans Joachim Rabe	(Germany) No. 808 asBest Racing		WD									—
Pos.	Driver	Team	NLS1	NLS2	NLS3	24H-Q		NLS6	NLS7	NLS8	NLS9	NLS10	Points

‡: Result not counted for classification

Colour	Result
Gold	Winner
Silver	Second place
Bronze	Third place
Green	Points classification
Blue	Non-points classification
Blue	Non-classified finish (NC)
Purple	Retired, not classified (Ret)
Red	Did not qualify (DNQ)
Red	Did not pre-qualify (DNPQ)
Black	Disqualified (DSQ)
White	Did not start (DNS)
White	Withdrew (WD)
White	Race cancelled (C)
Blank	Did not practice (DNP)
Blank	Did not arrive (DNA)
Blank	Excluded (EX)

===== AT1 =====
Pos.	Driver	Team	NLS1	NLS2	NLS3	24H-Q	NLS6	NLS7	NLS8	NLS9	NLS10	Points
1	(Germany) Dominik Fugel (Germany) Marcel Fugel	(Germany) No. 22 Max Kruse Racing								1^{2}	Ret	2
Pos.	Driver	Team	NLS1	NLS2	NLS3	24H-Q	NLS6	NLS7	NLS8	NLS9	NLS10	Points

‡: Result not counted for classification

Colour	Result
Gold	Winner
Silver	Second place
Bronze	Third place
Green	Points classification
Blue	Non-points classification
Blue	Non-classified finish (NC)
Purple	Retired, not classified (Ret)
Red	Did not qualify (DNQ)
Red	Did not pre-qualify (DNPQ)
Black	Disqualified (DSQ)
White	Did not start (DNS)
White	Withdrew (WD)
White	Race cancelled (C)
Blank	Did not practice (DNP)
Blank	Did not arrive (DNA)
Blank	Excluded (EX)

===== AT2 =====
Pos.	Driver	Team	NLS1	NLS2	NLS3	24H-Q		NLS6	NLS7	NLS8	NLS9	NLS10	Points
1	(Germany) Dominik Fugel (Germany) Marcel Fugel	(Germany) No. 644 Max Kruse Racing	1^{2}	1^{4}	1^{3}								9
Non-championship entries
—	(Germany) Björn Griesemann (Germany) Georg Griesemann	(Germany) No. 718 Manthey Team eFuel Griesemann		2^{3}	Ret	1^{2}	1^{2}		Ret	1^{2}			(9)
—	(Germany) Moritz Oestreich	(Germany) No. 644 Max Kruse Racing		1^{4}	1^{3}								(7)
—	(Germany) Tom	(Germany) No. 320 Four Motors Bioconcept-Car		3^{2}					1^{3}				(5)
—	(Switzerland) Marc Schöni (Germany) Smudo	(Germany) No. 320 Four Motors Bioconcept-Car							1^{3}				(3)
—	(Germany) Marco Holzer	(Germany) No. 718 Manthey Team eFuel Griesemann							Ret	1^{2}			(2)
—	(Germany) Benjamin Leuchter	(Germany) No. 644 Max Kruse Racing	1^{2}										(2)
—	(Germany) Dirk Adorf	(Germany) No. 718 Manthey Team eFuel Griesemann				1^{2}							(2)
—	(Germany) Yves Volte	(Germany) No. 718 Manthey Team eFuel Griesemann					1^{2}						(2)
—	(Germany) Michelle Halder (Germany) Luka Wlömer	(Germany) No. 320 Four Motors Bioconcept-Car		3^{2}									(2)
—	(Netherlands) Marco van Ramshorst	(Germany) No. 320 Four Motors Bioconcept-Car		WD									—
Pos.	Driver	Team	NLS1	NLS2	NLS3	24H-Q		NLS6	NLS7	NLS8	NLS9	NLS10	Points

‡: Result not counted for classification

Colour	Result
Gold	Winner
Silver	Second place
Bronze	Third place
Green	Points classification
Blue	Non-points classification
Blue	Non-classified finish (NC)
Purple	Retired, not classified (Ret)
Red	Did not qualify (DNQ)
Red	Did not pre-qualify (DNPQ)
Black	Disqualified (DSQ)
White	Did not start (DNS)
White	Withdrew (WD)
White	Race cancelled (C)
Blank	Did not practice (DNP)
Blank	Did not arrive (DNA)
Blank	Excluded (EX)

===== AT3 =====
Pos.	Driver	Team	NLS1	NLS2	NLS3	24H-Q		NLS6	NLS7	NLS8	NLS9	NLS10	Points
1	(Germany) Timo Hochwind	(Germany) No. 10 Max Kruse Racing	Ret	1^{11}	Ret			2^{4}	1^{6}	1^{4}	1^{4}	1^{3}	32
2	(Germany) Jasmin Preisig	(Germany) No. 10 Max Kruse Racing						2^{4}	1^{6}	1^{4}	1^{4}		22
2	(Germany) Jasmin Preisig	(Germany) No. 33 Max Kruse Racing		4^{4}									22
2	(Germany) Jasmin Preisig	(Germany) No. 76 Max Kruse Racing			Ret								22
3	(Germany) Janina Schall	(Singapore) No. 146 Giti Tire Motorsport by WS Racing				1^{3}	1^{3}	1^{5}					11
4	(Denmark) Lars Nielsen	(Germany) No. 333 Max Kruse Racing	1^{6}										6
5	(Switzerland) Dario Stanco	(Germany) No. 819 Max Kruse Racing			1^{4}								4
Non-championship entries
—	(Switzerland) Christoph Lenz	(Germany) No. 10 Max Kruse Racing						2^{4}	1^{6}	1^{4}	1^{4}		(27)
—	(Switzerland) Christoph Lenz	(Germany) No. 333 Max Kruse Racing							2^{4}	Ret			(27)
—	(Switzerland) Christoph Lenz	(Germany) No. 819 Max Kruse Racing	3^{3}	6^{2}	1^{4}								(27)
—	(Germany) Nicholas Otto	(Germany) No. 10 Max Kruse Racing		1^{11}								1^{3}	(20)
—	(Germany) Nicholas Otto	(Germany) No. 33 Max Kruse Racing									3^{2}		(20)
—	(Germany) Nicholas Otto	(Germany) No. 76 Max Kruse Racing			Ret								(20)
—	(Germany) Nicholas Otto	(Germany) No. 333 Max Kruse Racing							2^{4}	Ret			(20)
—	(Germany) Max Kruse	(Germany) No. 10 Max Kruse Racing										1^{3}	(16)
—	(Germany) Max Kruse	(Germany) No. 33 Max Kruse Racing		4^{4}							3^{2}		(16)
—	(Germany) Max Kruse	(Germany) No. 819 Max Kruse Racing	3^{3}		1^{4}								(16)
—	(Germany) Christian Gebhardt (Germany) Fabian Vettel	(Germany) No. 76 Max Kruse Racing	2^{4}	2^{8}									(12)
—	(France) Benjamin Cartery	(Germany) No. 10 Max Kruse Racing		1^{11}									(11)
—	(Latvia) Patricija Stalidzane	(Singapore) No. 146 Giti Tire Motorsport by WS Racing				1^{3}	1^{3}	1^{5}					(11)
—	(Netherlands) Robert de Haan (Denmark) Michelle Gatting (France) Alessandro Ghiretti	(Germany) No. 420 Four Motors Bioconcept-Car						3^{3}					(9)
—	(Netherlands) Robert de Haan (Denmark) Michelle Gatting (France) Alessandro Ghiretti	(Germany) No. 633 Four Motors Bioconcept-Car		3^{6}									(9)
—	(Germany) Heiko Hammel	(Germany) No. 10 Max Kruse Racing	Ret										(8)
—	(Germany) Heiko Hammel	(Germany) No. 76 Max Kruse Racing		2^{8}									(8)
—	(Netherlands) Beitske Visser	(Singapore) No. 146 Giti Tire Motorsport by WS Racing					1^{3}	1^{5}					(8)
—	(Denmark) Peter Hansen	(Germany) No. 333 Max Kruse Racing	1^{6}										(6)
—	(United States) David Ogburn (United States) Charles Turner	(Germany) No. 633 Four Motors Bioconcept-Car							3^{3}	2^{3}			(6)
—	(Germany) Carrie Schreiner	(Singapore) No. 146 Giti Tire Motorsport by WS Racing						1^{5}					(5)
—	(Netherlands) Rudy van Buren	(Germany) No. 819 Max Kruse Racing	3^{3}	6^{2}									(5)
—	(Germany) Henning Cramer (Switzerland) Marc Schöni (Germany) Oliver Sprungman	(Germany) No. 420 Four Motors Bioconcept-Car		5^{3}								2^{2}	(5)
—	(Sweden) Johan Kristoffersson	(Germany) No. 76 Max Kruse Racing	2^{4}										(4)
—	(United States) Andrew Engelmann	(Germany) No. 33 Max Kruse Racing		4^{4}									(4)
—	(Germany) Marcus Menden	(Germany) No. 333 Max Kruse Racing							2^{4}	Ret			(4)
—	(Germany) Christoph Hewer	(Germany) No. 420 Four Motors Bioconcept-Car		5^{3}									(3)
—	(Liechtenstein) Fabienne Wohlwend	(Singapore) No. 146 Giti Tire Motorsport by WS Racing				1^{3}							(3)
—	(United States) Christopher Allen (United States) Andrew Engelmann (United States) Robert Mau	(Germany) No. 333 Max Kruse Racing									2^{3}		(3)
—	(United States) Christopher Allen	(Germany) No. 819 Max Kruse Racing		6^{2}									(2)
—	(Germany) Montana	(Germany) No. 420 Four Motors Bioconcept-Car							NC				—
—	(Germany) Benjamin Leuchter	(Germany) No. 10 Max Kruse Racing			Ret								—
—	(Germany) Benjamin Leuchter	(Germany) No. 76 Max Kruse Racing			Ret								—
—	(China) Yan Chuang (China) Ma Qinghua (Hong Kong) Sunny Wong	(China) No. 827 Fancy Motorsport				Ret	Ret						—
Pos.	Driver	Team	NLS1	NLS2	NLS3	24H-Q		NLS6	NLS7	NLS8	NLS9	NLS10	Points

‡: Result not counted for classification

Colour	Result
Gold	Winner
Silver	Second place
Bronze	Third place
Green	Points classification
Blue	Non-points classification
Blue	Non-classified finish (NC)
Purple	Retired, not classified (Ret)
Red	Did not qualify (DNQ)
Red	Did not pre-qualify (DNPQ)
Black	Disqualified (DSQ)
White	Did not start (DNS)
White	Withdrew (WD)
White	Race cancelled (C)
Blank	Did not practice (DNP)
Blank	Did not arrive (DNA)
Blank	Excluded (EX)

===== TCR =====
Pos.	Driver	Team	NLS1	NLS2	NLS3	24H-Q		NLS6	NLS7	NLS8	NLS9	NLS10	Points
1	(Germany) Danny Brink (Armenia) Artur Goroyan	(Armenia) No. 777 Goroyan RT by sharky-racing	1^{2}	2^{4}	Ret	3^{3}	3^{3}	1^{4}	1^{4}	(1^{2})	(3^{2})	1^{3}	23 (27)
3	(Norway) Håkon Schjærin	(Norway) No. 801 Møller Bil Motorsport		1^{6}	1^{4}							2^{2}	12
Non-championship entries
—	(Kyrgyzstan) Oleg Kvitka	(Armenia) No. 777 Goroyan RT by sharky-racing				3^{3}	3^{3}	1^{4}	1^{4}	1^{2}	3^{2}	1^{3}	(21)
—	(Norway) Kenneth Østvold	(Norway) No. 801 Møller Bil Motorsport		1^{6}	1^{4}				2^{3}		2^{3}	2^{2}	(18)
—	(Armenia) Roman Mavlanov	(Armenia) No. 777 Goroyan RT by sharky-racing	1^{2}		Ret	3^{3}	3^{3}	1^{4}			3^{2}	1^{3}	(17)
—	(Spain) Mikel Azcona (Germany) Marc Basseng (Germany) Christer Jöns	(South Korea) No. 830 Hyundai N Motorsport				1^{6}	1^{6}						(12)
—	(Norway) Anders Lindstad	(Norway) No. 801 Møller Bil Motorsport			1^{4}				2^{3}		2^{3}	2^{2}	(12)
—	(Germany) Jens Wulf	(Germany) No. 808 asBest Racing		3^{3}	2^{3}			2^{3}	3^{2}				(11)
—	(United States) Michael Lewis (Canada) Robert Wickens	(South Korea) No. 831 Hyundai N Motorsport		4^{2}		2^{4}	2^{4}						(10)
—	(Norway) Atle Gulbrandsen	(Norway) No. 801 Møller Bil Motorsport		1^{6}					2^{3}				(9)
—	(United States) Mason Filippi (United States) Bryson Morris	(South Korea) No. 831 Hyundai N Motorsport				2^{4}	2^{4}						(8)
—	(Germany) Hans-Joachim Rabe	(Germany) No. 808 asBest Racing		3^{3}	2^{3}								(6)
—	(Germany) Dennis Leißing	(Germany) No. 808 asBest Racing			2^{3}	4^{2}							(5)
—	(Germany) Meik Utsch	(Germany) No. 808 asBest Racing						2^{3}	3^{2}				(5)
—	(France) Nathanaël Berthon	(Armenia) No. 777 Goroyan RT by sharky-racing		1^{4}									(4)
—	(Germany) Mike Halder (Portugal) Tiago Monteiro	(Estonia) No. 800 ALM Motorsport									1^{4}		(4)
—	(Germany) Lutz Obermann	(Germany) No. 808 asBest Racing				4^{2}	4^{2}						(4)
—	(Germany) Sebastian Schemmann (Germany) Henrik Seibel	(Germany) No. 808 asBest Racing						2^{3}					(3)
—	(South Korea) Kim Youngchan	(South Korea) No. 831 Hyundai N Motorsport		4^{2}									(2)
—	(Japan) Junichi Umemoto	(Germany) No. 808 asBest Racing				4^{2}							(2)
—	(Germany) Manuel Lauck	(South Korea) No. 830 Hyundai N Motorsport				WD	WD						—
Pos.	Driver	Team	NLS1	NLS2	NLS3	24H-Q		NLS6	NLS7	NLS8	NLS9	NLS10	Points

‡: Result not counted for classification

Colour	Result
Gold	Winner
Silver	Second place
Bronze	Third place
Green	Points classification
Blue	Non-points classification
Blue	Non-classified finish (NC)
Purple	Retired, not classified (Ret)
Red	Did not qualify (DNQ)
Red	Did not pre-qualify (DNPQ)
Black	Disqualified (DSQ)
White	Did not start (DNS)
White	Withdrew (WD)
White	Race cancelled (C)
Blank	Did not practice (DNP)
Blank	Did not arrive (DNA)
Blank	Excluded (EX)

===== V6 =====
Pos.	Driver	Team	NLS1	NLS2	NLS3	24H-Q		NLS6	NLS7	NLS8	NLS9	NLS10	Points
1	(Germany) Christian Büllesbach (Germany) Klaus Faßbender (Germany) Andreas Schettler	(Germany) No. 396 Adrenalin Motorsport Team Mainhattan Wheels	1^{3}	1^{4}	1^{8}	1^{4}	1^{4}	2^{4}	(1^{3})	(1^{3})	(2^{3})	1^{6}	33 (42)
4	(Switzerland) David Ackermann	(Germany) No. 410 rent2Drive-racing	2^{2}	3^{2}	4^{3}	2^{3}	2^{3}		Ret	2^{2}	3^{2}	(4^{2})	17 (19)
5	(France) Jérôme Larbi	(Germany) No. 410 rent2Drive-racing							Ret	2^{2}	3^{2}		4
Non-championship entries
—	(Germany) Daniel Zils	(Germany) No. 396 Adrenalin Motorsport Team Mainhattan Wheels	1^{3}	1^{4}	1^{8}	1^{4}	1^{4}	2^{4}	1^{3}	1^{3}	2^{3}	1^{6}	(42)
—	(Germany) Christian Heuchemer (Germany) Thomas Heuchemer	(Germany) No. 400 Schmickler Performance powered by Ravenol		2^{3}	2^{6}			1^{5}			1^{4}	2^{4}	(22)
—	(Germany) Sebastian Rings	No. 414 (No Entry Name)			3^{4}	3^{2}	3^{2}	3^{3}					(14)
—	(Germany) Sebastian Rings	No. 415 (No Entry Name)										3^{3}	(14)
—	(Germany) Andreas Schaflitzl	No. 414 (No Entry Name)			3^{4}	3^{2}	3^{2}	3^{3}					(11)
—	(Germany) Sascha Kloft	(Germany) No. 400 Schmickler Performance powered by Ravenol						1^{5}			1^{4}		(9)
—	(Italy) Stefano Croci (Germany) Stefan Müller	(Germany) No. 410 rent2Drive-racing				2^{3}	2^{3}					4^{2}	(8)
—	(Germany) Alexander Köppen	No. 414 (No Entry Name)			3^{4}	NC	NC						(7)
—	(Germany) Alexander Köppen	No. 415 (No Entry Name)										3^{3}	(7)
—	(United Kingdom) Scott Marshall	(Germany) No. 410 rent2Drive-racing		3^{2}		2^{3}	NC						(5)
—	(Germany) Laurents Hörr (Germany) Daniel Nölken	(Germany) No. 410 rent2Drive-racing	2^{2}		4^{3}								(5)
—	(Poland) Jacek Pydys	No. 414 (No Entry Name)				3^{2}	3^{2}						(4)
—	(Germany) Bastian Arend	No. 414 (No Entry Name)						3^{3}					(3)
—	(France) Joël Le Bihan	(Germany) No. 410 rent2Drive-racing							Ret	2^{2}			(2)
—	(Germany) Marcel Weber	(Germany) No. 410 rent2Drive-racing		3^{2}									(2)
—	(Germany) Richard Schäfer	(Germany) No. 410 rent2Drive-racing									3^{2}		(2)
—	(Germany) Alexander Weber	(Germany) No. 410 rent2Drive-racing										4^{2}	(2)
—	(Germany) John Finken (United States) Kyle Tilley	(Germany) No. 409 KKrämer Racing			Ret								—
Pos.	Driver	Team	NLS1	NLS2	NLS3	24H-Q		NLS6	NLS7	NLS8	NLS9	NLS10	Points

‡: Result not counted for classification

Colour	Result
Gold	Winner
Silver	Second place
Bronze	Third place
Green	Points classification
Blue	Non-points classification
Blue	Non-classified finish (NC)
Purple	Retired, not classified (Ret)
Red	Did not qualify (DNQ)
Red	Did not pre-qualify (DNPQ)
Black	Disqualified (DSQ)
White	Did not start (DNS)
White	Withdrew (WD)
White	Race cancelled (C)
Blank	Did not practice (DNP)
Blank	Did not arrive (DNA)
Blank	Excluded (EX)

===== V5 =====
Pos.	Driver	Team	NLS1	NLS2	NLS3	24H-Q		NLS6	NLS7	NLS8	NLS9	NLS10	Points
1	(Germany) Florian Ebener	(Germany) No. 440 QTQ Raceperformance	1^{6}	1^{8}	1^{6}				1^{4}	Ret	1^{8}	1^{6}	38
2	(Germany) Daniel Korn (Germany) Tobias Korn (Germany) Ulrich Korn	(Germany) No. 444 Adrenalin Motorsport Team Mainhattan Wheels	(4^{2})	3^{4}	Ret	1^{4}	1^{4}	1^{4}	2^{3}	2^{3}	Ret	2^{4}	26 (28)
5	(Germany) Georg Arbinger (France) Jérôme Larbi	(Germany) No. 445 Taxi-Arbinger-Racing by rent2Drive	2^{4}	4^{3}	3^{3}	3^{2}	3^{2}						14
Non-championship entries
—	(Germany) Mirco Böhmisch	(Germany) No. 440 QTQ Raceperformance	1^{6}	1^{8}	1^{6}				1^{4}	Ret			(24)
—	(Germany) Alexander Müller (Germany) Christian Weber	(Germany) No. 447 tm-racing.org		2^{6}				2^{3}			2^{6}	3^{3}	(18)
—	(Germany) Andreas Müller	(Germany) No. 440 QTQ Raceperformance	1^{6}	1^{8}									(14)
—	(Germany) Philip Schauerte	(Germany) No. 440 QTQ Raceperformance									1^{8}	1^{6}	(14)
—	(Germany) Florian Kramer	(Germany) No. 440 QTQ Raceperformance		1^{8}					1^{4}	Ret			(12)
—	(Germany) Jan Weber	(Germany) No. 447 tm-racing.org						2^{3}			2^{6}	3^{3}	(12)
—	(Germany) Reiner Neuffer	(Germany) No. 447 tm-racing.org		2^{6}									(9)
—	(Germany) Reiner Neuffer	(Germany) No. 448 tm-racing.org	3^{3}										(9)
—	(Switzerland) Alain Valente	(Germany) No. 440 QTQ Raceperformance									1^{8}		(8)
—	(Hungary) Adam Benko	(Germany) No. 444 Adrenalin Motorsport Team Mainhattan Wheels				1^{4}	1^{4}						(8)
—	(Germany) Levi O'Dey	No. 456 (No Entry Name)		DNS					3^{2}	1^{4}	Ret	4^{2}	(8)
—	(Germany) Marvin Schiede	No. 456 (No Entry Name)							3^{2}	1^{4}		4^{2}	(8)
—	(Germany) Bernd Kleeschulte	(Germany) No. 440 QTQ Raceperformance	1^{6}										(6)
—	(Germany) Fritz Hebig	(Germany) No. 440 QTQ Raceperformance										1^{6}	(6)
—	(Germany) Torsten Krey	(Germany) No. 447 tm-racing.org									2^{6}		(6)
—	(Germany) Jochen Krumbach	No. 456 (No Entry Name)		DNS					3^{2}	1^{4}	Ret		(6)
—	(China) Duan Jinyu (China) Ke Shao (China) Lu Chao	(Germany) No. 448 tm-racing.org		5^{2}	2^{4}								(6)
—	(Netherlands) Filip Hoenjet (United Kingdom) Jann Mardenborough	No. 455 (No Entry Name)				2^{3}	2^{3}						(6)
—	(United Kingdom) Scott Marshall	(Germany) No. 445 Taxi-Arbinger-Racing by rent2Drive	2^{4}										(4)
—	(Germany) Jan Hendrik Heimbach (Germany) Norman Oehlschläger (Germany) Marco Vitonelli	(Germany) No. 448 tm-racing.org									3^{4}		(4)
—	(France) Joël Le Bihan	(Germany) No. 445 Taxi-Arbinger-Racing by rent2Drive				3^{2}	3^{2}						(4)
—	(Germany) Sarah Ganser	No. 455 (No Entry Name)				2^{3}							(3)
—	(Germany) Quick Vic	(Germany) No. 447 tm-racing.org						2^{3}					(3)
—	(Germany) Holger Gachot	(Germany) No. 445 Taxi-Arbinger-Racing by rent2Drive		4^{3}									(3)
—	(Germany) Jan Ullrich	(Germany) No. 445 Taxi-Arbinger-Racing by rent2Drive				3^{2}							(2)
Pos.	Driver	Team	NLS1	NLS2	NLS3	24H-Q		NLS6	NLS7	NLS8	NLS9	NLS10	Points

‡: Result not counted for classification

Colour	Result
Gold	Winner
Silver	Second place
Bronze	Third place
Green	Points classification
Blue	Non-points classification
Blue	Non-classified finish (NC)
Purple	Retired, not classified (Ret)
Red	Did not qualify (DNQ)
Red	Did not pre-qualify (DNPQ)
Black	Disqualified (DSQ)
White	Did not start (DNS)
White	Withdrew (WD)
White	Race cancelled (C)
Blank	Did not practice (DNP)
Blank	Did not arrive (DNA)
Blank	Excluded (EX)

===== VT3 =====
Pos.	Driver	Team	NLS1	NLS2	NLS3	24H-Q	NLS6	NLS7	NLS8	NLS9	NLS10	Points
1	(Germany) Jörg Schönfelder	(Germany) No. 460 Keeevin Sports and Racing					1^{3}	1^{2}	1^{2}	1^{2}		9
2	(Germany) Serge van Vooren	(Germany) No. 460 Keeevin Sports and Racing					1^{3}	1^{2}	1^{2}			7
3	(Brazil) Flavia Pellegrino Fernandes	(Germany) No. 460 Keeevin Sports and Racing	1^{2}	NC	DNS		1^{3}					5
4	(Germany) Marco Schmitz	(Germany) No. 460 Keeevin Sports and Racing	1^{2}	NC	DNS							2
Non-championship entries
—	(Germany) Matthias Aretz	(Germany) No. 460 Keeevin Sports and Racing					1^{3}	1^{2}	1^{2}			(7)
—	(Germany) Mark Trompeter	(Germany) No. 460 Keeevin Sports and Racing	1^{2}	NC	DNS							(2)
—	(Germany) Axel Duffner (United Kingdom) Alex Wright	(Germany) No. 460 Keeevin Sports and Racing								1^{2}		(2)
Pos.	Driver	Team	NLS1	NLS2	NLS3	24H-Q	NLS6	NLS7	NLS8	NLS9	NLS10	Points

‡: Result not counted for classification

Colour	Result
Gold	Winner
Silver	Second place
Bronze	Third place
Green	Points classification
Blue	Non-points classification
Blue	Non-classified finish (NC)
Purple	Retired, not classified (Ret)
Red	Did not qualify (DNQ)
Red	Did not pre-qualify (DNPQ)
Black	Disqualified (DSQ)
White	Did not start (DNS)
White	Withdrew (WD)
White	Race cancelled (C)
Blank	Did not practice (DNP)
Blank	Did not arrive (DNA)
Blank	Excluded (EX)

===== VT2 =====
====== VT2-F+4WD ======
Pos.	Driver	Team	NLS1	NLS2	NLS3	24H-Q		NLS6	NLS7	NLS8	NLS9	NLS10	Points
1	(Germany) Christoph Dupré (Germany) Joachim Nett	(Germany) No. 480 Dupré Engineering	(8^{1})	1^{15}	Ret	3^{8}	(4^{6})	1^{19}	DSQ	1^{15}	1^{15}	2^{8}	80 (87)
3	(Germany) Michael Bohrer (Germany) Gerrit Holthaus	(Germany) No. 467 CSRacing	1^{15}	2^{11}	DSQ	1^{15}	Ret	3^{10}	1^{15}	2^{11}	(3^{8})	Ret	77 (85)
5	(Germany) Jürgen Nett	(Germany) No. 480 Dupré Engineering	(8^{1})	1^{15}	Ret	3^{8}	4^{6}	1^{19}	DSQ	1^{15}		2^{8}	71 (72)
6	(Germany) Pascal Otto Fritzsche (Germany) Thomas Schönfeld	No. 494 (No Entry Name)	Ret	3^{8}	1^{15}	2^{11}	1^{15}	7^{3}	2^{11}	5^{4}	Ret		67
8	(Germany) Tobias Jung (Germany) Christoph Schmitz (Germany) Marcel Unland	(Germany) No. 470 Auto Thomas by Jung Motorsport	2^{11}	(4^{6})	3^{8}	(4^{6})	Ret	4^{8}	3^{8}	3^{8}	2^{11}	1^{11}	65 (77)
11	(Germany) Alex Schneider	(Germany) No. 491 STENLE Marketing by Mertens Motorsport	Ret	Ret	Ret	Ret	WD		4^{6}	7^{2}	4^{6}	3^{6}	34
11	(Germany) Alex Schneider	(Germany) No. 492 STENLE Marketing by Mertens Motorsport						2^{14}					34
11	(Germany) Alex Schneider	(Germany) No. 496 STENLE Marketing by Mertens Motorsport	3^{8} ‡		4^{6} ‡			9^{1} ‡					34
11	(India) Akshay Gupta	(Germany) No. 491 STENLE Marketing by Mertens Motorsport	Ret	Ret	Ret	Ret	WD		4^{6}	7^{2}	4^{6}	3^{6}	34
11	(India) Akshay Gupta	(Germany) No. 492 STENLE Marketing by Mertens Motorsport						2^{14}					34
13	(Germany) Maximilian Simons	(Germany) No. 471 Auto Thomas by Jung Motorsport	5^{4}						5^{4}	6^{3}	6^{3}	5^{3}	29 (30)
13	(Germany) Maximilian Simons	(Germany) No. 472 Auto Thomas by Jung Motorsport				8^{1}	2^{11}	(10^{1})					29 (30)
14	(Germany) Ralf Wiesner	(Germany) No. 496 STENLE Marketing by Mertens Motorsport	3^{8}	DNS	4^{6}			9^{1}			5^{4}		19
15	(Germany) Michael Eichhorn	(Germany) No. 471 Auto Thomas by Jung Motorsport	5^{4}			6^{3}	Ret	8^{1}	5^{4}	6^{3}		5^{3}	18
16	(Germany) Oliver Kriese	No. 481 (No Entry Name)							NC	Ret	7^{2}	4^{4}	6
17	(Brazil) Flavia Pellegrino Fernandes	(Germany) No. 477 asBest Racing							6^{3}	9^{1}			4
Non-championship entries
—	(Germany) Stephan Epp	(Germany) No. 467 CSRacing						3^{10}	1^{15}	2^{11}	3^{8}	Ret	(44)
—	(Germany) Lars Füting	(Germany) No. 471 Auto Thomas by Jung Motorsport									6^{3}		(22)
—	(Germany) Lars Füting	(Germany) No. 472 Auto Thomas by Jung Motorsport	7^{2}	5^{4}	Ret	8^{1}	2^{11}	10^{1}					(22)
—	(Austria) Maximilan Malinowski	(Germany) No. 480 Dupré Engineering									1^{15}		(20)
—	(Austria) Maximilan Malinowski	(Germany) No. 482 Dupré Engineering						5^{5}					(20)
—	(Germany) Tim Robertz	(Germany) No. 472 Auto Thomas by Jung Motorsport	7^{2}	5^{4}	Ret	8^{1}	2^{11}						(18)
—	(Belgium) Jarno D'Hauw	(Germany) No. 492 STENLE Marketing by Mertens Motorsport						2^{14}					(14)
—	(Sweden) Oliver Söderström	(Germany) No. 466 Walkenhorst Motorsport		6^{3}	2^{11}								(14)
—	(Netherlands) Chris Rothoff	(Germany) No. 472 Auto Thomas by Jung Motorsport				8^{1}	2^{11}						(12)
—	(Austria) Raphael Rennhofer	(Germany) No. 499 Keeevin Sports and Racing	Ret										(12)
—	(Austria) Raphael Rennhofer	(Germany) No. 488 SRS Team Sorg Rennsport				5^{4}	3^{8}						(12)
—	(Italy) Alberto Carobbio (Italy) Ugo Vicenzi	(Germany) No. 488 SRS Team Sorg Rennsport				5^{4}	3^{8}						(12)
—	(Germany) Darian Donkel	(Germany) No. 491 STENLE Marketing by Mertens Motorsport									4^{6}	3^{6}	(12)
—	(Colombia) Mateo Villagomez	(Germany) No. 466 Walkenhorst Motorsport			2^{11}			Ret					(11)
—	(Germany) Fabian Tillmann	No. 474 (No Entry Name)						6^{4}					(11)
—	(Germany) Fabian Tillmann	(Germany) No. 492 STENLE Marketing by Mertens Motorsport									8^{1}		(11)
—	(Germany) Fabian Tillmann	(Germany) No. 496 STENLE Marketing by Mertens Motorsport							DNS	4^{6}			(11)
—	(Germany) Markus Weinstock	(Germany) No. 471 Auto Thomas by Jung Motorsport						8^{1}	5^{4}	6^{3}		5^{3}	(11)
—	(United Kingdom) Samuel Harrison	(Germany) No. 492 STENLE Marketing by Mertens Motorsport							DNS	8^{1}			(10)
—	(United Kingdom) Samuel Harrison	(Germany) No. 496 STENLE Marketing by Mertens Motorsport							DNS	4^{6}	5^{4}		(10)
—	(Germany) Marc Etzkorn	(Germany) No. 471 Auto Thomas by Jung Motorsport									6^{3}		(9)
—	(Germany) Marc Etzkorn	(Germany) No. 472 Auto Thomas by Jung Motorsport	7^{2}	5^{4}									(9)
—	(Germany) Christian Koger	(Germany) No. 477 asBest Racing	Ret	7^{2}	5^{4}	7^{2}	WD						(8)
—	(South Korea) Son Geon	(Germany) No. 492 STENLE Marketing by Mertens Motorsport	4^{6}								8^{1}		(7)
—	(South Korea) Kim Youngchan	(Germany) No. 492 STENLE Marketing by Mertens Motorsport	4^{6}										(6)
—	(Germany) Achim Ewenz	(Germany) No. 472 Auto Thomas by Jung Motorsport	7^{2}	5^{4}									(6)
—	(Canada) Josh Hansen	(Germany) No. 466 Walkenhorst Motorsport	6^{3}	6^{3}									(6)
—	(Germany) Claus Dupré (Germany) René Steiger	(Germany) No. 482 Dupré Engineering						5^{5}					(5)
—	(Germany) Roman Schiemenz (Germany) Mark Trompeter	(Germany) No. 477 asBest Racing			5^{4}								(4)
—	(Germany) Fritz Hebig (Switzerland) Boris Hrubesch (Denmark) Kaj Schubert	No. 474 (No Entry Name)						6^{4}					(4)
—	(Germany) Marcel Müller	(Germany) No. 471 Auto Thomas by Jung Motorsport						8^{1}				5^{3}	(4)
—	(Poland) Rafal Gieras (Germany) David Vogt	(Germany) No. 477 asBest Racing							6^{3}	9^{1}			(4)
—	(United Kingdom) Leonidas Karavasili	(Germany) No. 491 STENLE Marketing by Mertens Motorsport							7^{2}	7^{2}			(4)
—	(Switzerland) Fabio Scherer	(Germany) No. 466 Walkenhorst Motorsport	6^{3}					Ret					(3)
—	(Germany) Andreas Winterwerber	(Germany) No. 471 Auto Thomas by Jung Motorsport				6^{3}	Ret						(3)
—	(United States) Gino Manley	(Germany) No. 466 Walkenhorst Motorsport	6^{3}										(3)
—	(United Kingdom) Tom Edgar	(Germany) No. 466 Walkenhorst Motorsport		6^{3}									(3)
—	(Germany) Hans-Joachim Legermann (Germany) Kevin Olaf Rost (Germany) Olaf Rost	(Germany) No. 475 asBest Racing			6^{3}								(3)
—	(Germany) Bastian Beck	(Germany) No. 477 asBest Racing							6^{3}				(3)
—	(United Kingdom) Callum Davies	(Germany) No. 491 STENLE Marketing by Mertens Motorsport							7^{2}				(3)
—	(United Kingdom) Callum Davies	(Germany) No. 492 STENLE Marketing by Mertens Motorsport								8^{1}			(3)
—	(Germany) Lutz Obermann	(Germany) No. 477 asBest Racing		7^{2}									(2)
—	(Japan) Gaku Hoshino (Japan) Takafumi Hoshino (Japan) Atsushi Taniguchi	(Germany) No. 486 Team HAL			7^{2}								(2)
—	(United States) Seth Brown (Germany) Thomas Mennecke	(Germany) No. 477 asBest Racing				7^{2}	WD						(2)
—	(China) Kuang Canwei	(Germany) No. 491 STENLE Marketing by Mertens Motorsport							7^{2}				(2)
—	(Germany) Gregor Starck	No. 481 (No Entry Name)									7^{2}		(2)
—	(Germany) Robert Neumann	No. 481 (No Entry Name)		8^{1}	8^{1}				NC	Ret			(2)
—	(Germany) Martin Kafka	No. 481 (No Entry Name)		8^{1}	8^{1}								(2)
—	(Germany) Michael Wolpertinger	(Germany) No. 492 STENLE Marketing by Mertens Motorsport								8^{1}			(1)
—	(Germany) Daniel Jenichen (Germany) Rudi Speich	(Germany) No. 472 Auto Thomas by Jung Motorsport						10^{1}					(1)
—	(Germany) Daniel Mertens	(Germany) No. 491 STENLE Marketing by Mertens Motorsport	Ret	Ret	Ret	Ret	WD						—
—	(Germany) Daniel Mertens	(Germany) No. 496 STENLE Marketing by Mertens Motorsport		DNS									—
—	(Germany) Florian Discher (Germany) Henrik Seibel	(Germany) No. 477 asBest Racing	Ret										—
—	(Poland) Sebastian Lawniczeck (Germany) Daniel Sowada	(Germany) No. 499 Keeevin Sports and Racing	Ret										—
—	(France) Francois Wales	(Germany) No. 472 Auto Thomas by Jung Motorsport			Ret								—
—	(Norway) Emil Christian Gjerdrum (Australia) Lachlan Robinson	(Germany) No. 466 Walkenhorst Motorsport						Ret					—
—	(Poland) Aleksy Drywien (Poland) Rafal Piotrowski	(Germany) No. 490 Keeevin Sports and Racing									Ret		—
—	(Germany) Richard Schäfer	(Germany) No. 492 STENLE Marketing by Mertens Motorsport							DNS				—
—	(Germany) Markus Bückle (Germany) Maximilian Hill (Germany) Tabea Jünger	(Germany) No. 488 SRS Team Sorg Rennsport										DNS	—
Pos.	Driver	Team	NLS1	NLS2	NLS3	24H-Q		NLS6	NLS7	NLS8	NLS9	NLS10	Points

‡: Result not counted for classification

Colour	Result
Gold	Winner
Silver	Second place
Bronze	Third place
Green	Points classification
Blue	Non-points classification
Blue	Non-classified finish (NC)
Purple	Retired, not classified (Ret)
Red	Did not qualify (DNQ)
Red	Did not pre-qualify (DNPQ)
Black	Disqualified (DSQ)
White	Did not start (DNS)
White	Withdrew (WD)
White	Race cancelled (C)
Blank	Did not practice (DNP)
Blank	Did not arrive (DNA)
Blank	Excluded (EX)

====== VT2-RWD ======
Pos.	Driver	Team	NLS1	NLS2	NLS3	24H-Q		NLS6	NLS7	NLS8	NLS9	NLS10	Points
1	(Germany) Philipp Leisen	(Germany) No. 500 Adrenalin Motorsport Team Mainhattan Wheels	1^{15}	1^{15}	Ret	(2^{11})	1^{15}	2^{14}	1^{15}	1^{15}	1^{15}	(3^{8})	104 (123)
1	(Germany) Philipp Leisen	(Germany) No. 501 Adrenalin Motorsport Team Mainhattan Wheels								3^{8} ‡			104 (123)
1	(Germany) Philipp Stahlschmidt	(Germany) No. 500 Adrenalin Motorsport Team Mainhattan Wheels	1^{15}	1^{15}	Ret	(2^{11})	1^{15}	2^{14}	1^{15}	1^{15}	1^{15}	(3^{8})	104 (123)
1	(Germany) Philipp Stahlschmidt	(Germany) No. 501 Adrenalin Motorsport Team Mainhattan Wheels							4^{6} ‡				104 (123)
1	(Germany) Daniel Zils	(Germany) No. 500 Adrenalin Motorsport Team Mainhattan Wheels	1^{15}	1^{15}	Ret	(2^{11})	1^{15}	2^{14}	1^{15}	1^{15}	1^{15}	(3^{8})	104 (123)
4	(Netherlands) Calvin de Groot (Netherlands) Piet-Jan Ooms (Germany) Marius Rauer	(Germany) No. 504 SRS Team Sorg Rennsport	2^{11}	2^{11}	1^{15}	Ret	WD	Ret	3^{8}	2^{11}	2^{11}	2^{11}	78
7	(Germany) Tim Peeters	(Germany) No. 514 SRS Team Sorg Rennsport	3^{8}	4^{6}	3^{8}	3^{8}	(7^{2})	(8^{1})	5^{4}	4^{6}	6^{3}	(7^{2})	43 (48)
8	(Germany) Sub7BTG	(Germany) No. 501 Adrenalin Motorsport Team Mainhattan Wheels	4^{6}	Ret		Ret	3^{8}	4^{8}	4^{6}	3^{8}	5^{4}	Ret	40
9	(Japan) Masaaki Hatano	(Germany) No. 519 Team HAL		3^{8}	4^{6}			3^{10}	9^{1}	DSQ	4^{6}	5^{4}	35
10	(Germany) Matthias Beckwermert	(Germany) No. 501 Adrenalin Motorsport Team Mainhattan Wheels	4^{6}	Ret		Ret	3^{8}	4^{8}			5^{4}	Ret	26
11	(Germany) Thomas Ehrhardt	(Singapore) No. 502 Giti Tire Motorsport by WS Racing	6^{3}	7^{2}	Ret	6^{3}	4^{6}	7^{3}					17
12	(United Kingdom) Harry Barton	(Germany) No. 504 SRS Team Sorg Rennsport						Ret					10
12	(United Kingdom) Harry Barton	(Germany) No. 514 SRS Team Sorg Rennsport							5^{4}	4^{6}			10
13	(Brazil) Flavia Pellegrino Fernandes (Germany) Marco Schmitz (Germany) Karl-Heinz Teichmann	(Germany) No. 484 Teichmann Racing				Ret	5^{4}						4
Non-championship entries
—	(Germany) Harald Barth (Germany) Marcel Manheller	(Germany) No. 515 Manheller Racing						1^{19}	2^{11}		3^{8}	1^{15}	(53)
—	(Germany) Manfred Röss (Germany) Matthias Röss (Germany) Malte Tack	(Germany) No. 520 Toyo Tires with Ring Racing			2^{11}	1^{15}	2^{11}						(37)
—	(Germany) Christoph Blümer	(Germany) No. 514 SRS Team Sorg Rennsport	3^{8}	4^{6}	3^{8}			8^{1}					(23)
—	(Malaysia) Mitchell Cheah Min Jie	(Germany) No. 519 Team HAL			4^{6}			3^{10}				5^{4}	(20)
—	(Germany) Kurt Strube	(Germany) No. 514 SRS Team Sorg Rennsport	3^{8}		3^{8}							7^{2}	(18)
—	(Germany) Niklas Ehrhardt	(Singapore) No. 502 Giti Tire Motorsport by WS Racing	6^{3}	7^{2}	Ret	6^{3}	4^{6}	7^{3}					(17)
—	(Germany) Beat Schmitz	(Germany) No. 508 MSC Adenau e.V. im ADAC						6^{4}	10^{1}		7^{2}	4^{6}	(13)
—	(Germany) Christian Koch	(Germany) No. 508 MSC Adenau e.V. im ADAC						6^{4}			7^{2}	4^{6}	(12)
—	(France) Loris Cabirou	(Germany) No. 514 SRS Team Sorg Rennsport				3^{8}	7^{2}	8^{1}					(11)
—	(Japan) Masahiro Sasaki	(Germany) No. 519 Team HAL						3^{10}					(10)
—	(Germany) Christian Coen	(Germany) No. 514 SRS Team Sorg Rennsport				3^{8}	7^{2}						(10)
—	(Netherlands) Joep Breedveld	(Germany) No. 514 SRS Team Sorg Rennsport							5^{4}	4^{6}			(10)
—	(Japan) Takuma Miyazono	(Germany) No. 520 Toyo Tires with Ring Racing	5^{4}					5^{5}	8^{1}	NC			(10)
—	(United Kingdom) Jack James	(Singapore) No. 506 Giti Tire Motorsport by WS Racing	Ret	6^{3}	DSQ	5^{4}	6^{3}						(10)
—	(United Kingdom) Thomas Canning	(Singapore) No. 502 Giti Tire Motorsport by WS Racing				6^{3}	4^{6}						(9)
—	(Japan) Masato Kawabata	(Germany) No. 520 Toyo Tires with Ring Racing	5^{4}					5^{5}					(9)
—	(Japan) Yutaka Seki	(Germany) No. 515 Manheller Racing									3^{8}		(8)
—	(Germany) Jan Ullrich	(Singapore) No. 502 Giti Tire Motorsport by WS Racing		7^{2}				7^{3}					(8)
—	(Germany) Jan Ullrich	(Singapore) No. 506 Giti Tire Motorsport by WS Racing	Ret				6^{3}						(8)
—	(Germany) Mathias Baar	(Germany) No. 514 SRS Team Sorg Rennsport		4^{6}				8^{1}					(7)
—	(China) Wu Chengqi (China) Liu Kainian	(Singapore) No. 506 Giti Tire Motorsport by WS Racing				5^{4}	6^{3}						(7)
—	(United States) Tyler Hoffman (United States) Robert Walker	(Germany) No. 512 AV Racing by Black Falcon							6^{3}	5^{4}			(7)
—	(Japan) Takashi Ito (Japan) Kohta Kawaai (Malaysia) Chong Kiat Wai	No. 268 (No Entry Name)				4^{6}	Ret						(6)
—	(Germany) Fabian Pirrone	(Singapore) No. 502 Giti Tire Motorsport by WS Racing						7^{3}				6^{3}	(6)
—	(Germany) Fabian Pirrone	(Singapore) No. 506 Giti Tire Motorsport by WS Racing	Ret										(6)
—	(Germany) Roman Fellner-Felldegg	(Germany) No. 514 SRS Team Sorg Rennsport									6^{3}	7^{2}	(5)
—	(Germany) Michael Wolpertinger	(Germany) No. 505 Time Attack Paderborn	DNS	5^{4}	Ret								(4)
—	(Germany) Michael Wolpertinger	No. 510 (No Entry Name)						Ret					(4)
—	(United States) William Wachs	(Germany) No. 505 Time Attack Paderborn		5^{4}									(4)
—	(Switzerland) Boris Hrubesch (Denmark) Kaj Schubert	(Germany) No. 505 Time Attack Paderborn	DNS	5^{4}									(4)
—	(Germany) Michael Mönch	(Germany) No. 484 Teichmann Racing				Ret	5^{4}						(4)
—	(United States) Ryan Harrison	(Germany) No. 512 AV Racing by Black Falcon								5^{4}			(4)
—	(Germany) Andreas Pöschko (Germany) Markus Schiller	(Germany) No. 508 MSC Adenau e.V. im ADAC						6^{4}					(4)
—	(Argentina) Andres Bruno Josephsohn (Argentina) Eduardo Romanelli (Argentina) Jose Visir	(Germany) No. 516 Manheller Racing							11^{1}	6^{3}			(4)
—	(Czech Republic) Michal Makes	(Singapore) No. 502 Giti Tire Motorsport by WS Racing			Ret								(3)
—	(Czech Republic) Michal Makes	(Singapore) No. 506 Giti Tire Motorsport by WS Racing		6^{3}									(3)
—	(Canada) Damon Surzyshyn	(Singapore) No. 502 Giti Tire Motorsport by WS Racing	6^{3}										(3)
—	(United Kingdom) Matt	(Germany) No. 514 SRS Team Sorg Rennsport									6^{3}		(3)
—	(Germany) Robert Hinzer (Australia) Bart Horsten	(Singapore) No. 502 Giti Tire Motorsport by WS Racing										6^{3}	(3)
—	(Germany) Andre Sommerberg	(Germany) No. 508 MSC Adenau e.V. im ADAC							10^{1}		7^{2}		(3)
—	(United States) Seth Brown	(Germany) No. 514 SRS Team Sorg Rennsport					7^{2}						(2)
—	(Germany) Benjamin Baller (Netherlands) Lars van 't Veer	No. 510 (No Entry Name)		Ret				Ret	7^{2}			Ret	(2)
—	(Austria) Elena Egger (Estonia) Carmen Kraav	(Singapore) No. 506 Giti Tire Motorsport by WS Racing									9^{1}	8^{1}	(2)
—	(Japan) Hokuto Matsuyama	(Germany) No. 520 Toyo Tires with Ring Racing							8^{1}	NC			(1)
—	(Germany) Florian Ebener (Germany) Florian Quante (Switzerland) Alain Valente	No. 503 (No Entry Name)									8^{1}		(1)
—	(Latvia) Patricija Stalidzane	(Singapore) No. 506 Giti Tire Motorsport by WS Racing										8^{1}	(1)
—	(Japan) Tohjiro Azuma	(Germany) No. 519 Team HAL							9^{1}	DSQ			(1)
—	(Germany) Julia Ponkratz	(Singapore) No. 506 Giti Tire Motorsport by WS Racing									9^{1}		(1)
—	(Norway) Emil Christian Gjerdrum (Germany) Ingo Horst (Germany) Lutz Horst	(Singapore) No. 502 Giti Tire Motorsport by WS Racing									10^{1}		(1)
—	(Germany) Fabian Tillmann	(Germany) No. 505 Time Attack Paderborn	DNS		Ret								—
—	(Germany) Bernd Kleeschulte (Germany) Florian Kramer (Germany) Andreas Müller	No. 503 (No Entry Name)		Ret									—
—	(Australia) Lachlan Robinson (China) Yeh Chejen	(Singapore) No. 506 Giti Tire Motorsport by WS Racing			DSQ								—
Pos.	Driver	Team	NLS1	NLS2	NLS3	24H-Q		NLS6	NLS7	NLS8	NLS9	NLS10	Points

‡: Result not counted for classification

Colour	Result
Gold	Winner
Silver	Second place
Bronze	Third place
Green	Points classification
Blue	Non-points classification
Blue	Non-classified finish (NC)
Purple	Retired, not classified (Ret)
Red	Did not qualify (DNQ)
Red	Did not pre-qualify (DNPQ)
Black	Disqualified (DSQ)
White	Did not start (DNS)
White	Withdrew (WD)
White	Race cancelled (C)
Blank	Did not practice (DNP)
Blank	Did not arrive (DNA)
Blank	Excluded (EX)

===== BMW M240i =====
Pos.	Driver	Team	NLS1	NLS2	NLS3	24H-Q		NLS6	NLS7	NLS8	NLS9	NLS10	Points
1	(Germany) Sven Markert (Germany) Kevin Wambach	(Germany) No. 1 Adrenalin Motorsport Team Mainhattan Wheels	1^{15}	1^{11}	1^{15}	1^{15}	1^{15}	1^{19}	Ret	Ret	(6^{3})	1^{11}	101 (104)
3	(Netherlands) John van der Sanden	(Germany) No. 680 PTerting Sports by Up2Race	(5^{4})	3^{6}		(8^{1})	2^{11}	2^{14}	1^{15}	2^{11}	1^{15}	(3^{6})	83 (94)
3	(Netherlands) John van der Sanden	(Germany) No. 670 PTerting Sports by Up2Race			2^{11}								83 (94)
4	(Germany) Jannik Reinhard	(Germany) No. 680 PTerting Sports by Up2Race		3^{6}	(5^{4})	(8^{1})	2^{11}	2^{14}	1^{15}	2^{11}	1^{15}	3^{6}	78 (83)
5	(Germany) Michel Albers / "Alboretto"	(Germany) No. 680 PTerting Sports by Up2Race							1^{15}	2^{11}		3^{6}	32
6	(Germany) Karl Lukaschewsky	(Germany) No. 680 PTerting Sports by Up2Race	5^{4}	3^{6}	5^{4}	8^{1}	2^{11}						26
7	(Germany) Maximilian Eisberg	(Singapore) No. 665 Giti Tire Motorsport by WS Racing	Ret	Ret	4^{6}	Ret	WD						20
7	(Germany) Maximilian Eisberg	(Germany) No. 680 PTerting Sports by Up2Race						2^{14}					20
8	(Germany) Marvin Marino	(Germany) No. 1 Adrenalin Motorsport Team Mainhattan Wheels	1^{15}										15
9	(Norway) Oskar Sandberg	(Germany) No. 651 Adrenalin Motorsport Team Mainhattan Wheels									2^{11}		11
10	(Germany) Jörg Schönfelder (Germany) Serge van Vooren	(Germany) No. 669 Keeevin Sports and Racing	7^{2}										5
10	(Germany) Jörg Schönfelder (Germany) Serge van Vooren	(Germany) No. 660 Keeevin Sports and Racing		DNS	6^{3}								5
12	(Germany) Thomas Ehrhardt	(Singapore) No. 665 Giti Tire Motorsport by WS Racing									5^{4}		4
13	(Germany) Matthias Beckwermert (Germany) Sub7BTG	(Germany) No. 653 Adrenalin Motorsport Team Mainhattan Wheels			11^{1}								1
Non-championship entries
—	(Germany) Adrian Rziczny	(Germany) No. 1 Adrenalin Motorsport Team Mainhattan Wheels		1^{11}	1^{15}	1^{15}	1^{15}	1^{19}	Ret	Ret	6^{3}	1^{11}	(89)
—	(Germany) Lars Harbeck	(Germany) No. 651 Adrenalin Motorsport Team Mainhattan Wheels	3^{8}	2^{8}	7^{2}			6^{4}	2^{11}	4^{6}	2^{11}	2^{8}	(58)
—	(Moldova) Serghei Ievlev	(Germany) No. 651 Adrenalin Motorsport Team Mainhattan Wheels									2^{11}	2^{8}	(29)
—	(Moldova) Serghei Ievlev	(Germany) No. 652 Adrenalin Motorsport Team Mainhattan Wheels							4^{6}	5^{4}			(29)
—	(New Zealand) Aaren Russell (New Zealand) Drew Russell	(United Kingdom) No. 667 Breakell Racing							3^{8}	1^{15}			(23)
—	(United States) Henry Drury (United Kingdom) Alex Sedgwick	(Germany) No. 670 PTerting Sports by Up2Race	2^{11}		2^{11}								(22)
—	(Germany) Jan Ullrich	(Singapore) No. 665 Giti Tire Motorsport by WS Racing							6^{3}	3^{8}	5^{4}	4^{4}	(19)
—	(Norway) Peder Saltvedt (Denmark) Eirik Wenaas-Schei	(Germany) No. 651 Adrenalin Motorsport Team Mainhattan Wheels						6^{4}					(18)
—	(Norway) Peder Saltvedt (Denmark) Eirik Wenaas-Schei	(Germany) No. 652 Adrenalin Motorsport Team Mainhattan Wheels				3^{8}	4^{6}						(18)
—	(Germany) Andre Duve	(Germany) No. 651 Adrenalin Motorsport Team Mainhattan Wheels							2^{11}	4^{6}			(17)
—	(United Kingdom) Farquini Deott	(Germany) No. 651 Adrenalin Motorsport Team Mainhattan Wheels		2^{8}									(16)
—	(United Kingdom) Farquini Deott	(Germany) No. 652 Adrenalin Motorsport Team Mainhattan Wheels									3^{8}		(16)
—	(Germany) Anton Abee	(Germany) No. 680 PTerting Sports by Up2Race									1^{15}		(15)
—	(Germany) Torben Berger	(Germany) No. 670 PTerting Sports by Up2Race	2^{11}										(15)
—	(Germany) Torben Berger	(Germany) No. 680 PTerting Sports by Up2Race			5^{4}								(15)
—	(Germany) Lion Düker	(Germany) No. 652 Adrenalin Motorsport Team Mainhattan Wheels		Ret	9^{1}								(15)
—	(Germany) Lion Düker	(Germany) No. 651 Adrenalin Motorsport Team Mainhattan Wheels				4^{6}	3^{8}						(15)
—	(France) Adrien Paviot	(Singapore) No. 665 Giti Tire Motorsport by WS Racing							6^{3}	3^{8}		4^{4}	(15)
—	(United Kingdom) Lorcan Hanafin	(Germany) No. 651 Adrenalin Motorsport Team Mainhattan Wheels				4^{6}	3^{8}						(14)
—	(United States) Johnny Huang (United States) Nico Silva (United States) Robert Walker	(Germany) No. 653 Adrenalin Motorsport Team Mainhattan Wheels				2^{11}	7^{2}						(13)
—	(France) Tom Dillmann (Poland) Jakub Śmiechowski	(Germany) No. 670 PTerting Sports by Up2Race		4^{4}									(12)
—	(France) Tom Dillmann (Poland) Jakub Śmiechowski	(Germany) No. 671 PTerting Sports by Up2Race			3^{8}								(12)
—	(Germany) Robin Reimer	(Germany) No. 651 Adrenalin Motorsport Team Mainhattan Wheels							2^{11}				(11)
—	(Australia) Bart Horsten	(Singapore) No. 665 Giti Tire Motorsport by WS Racing							6^{3}	3^{8}			(11)
—	(Austria) Jannik-Julius Bernhard (Czech Republic) Martin Bus (Germany) Joris Primke	(Germany) No. 653 Adrenalin Motorsport Team Mainhattan Wheels						3^{10}					(10)
—	(Belgium) Axel Soyez	(Germany) No. 651 Adrenalin Motorsport Team Mainhattan Wheels			7^{2}								(10)
—	(Belgium) Axel Soyez	(Germany) No. 652 Adrenalin Motorsport Team Mainhattan Wheels				3^{8}							(10)
—	(Germany) Laura Luft	(Germany) No. 652 Adrenalin Motorsport Team Mainhattan Wheels							4^{6}	5^{4}			(10)
—	(China) Hu Heng (China) Jiang Jiawei (China) Yang Shuo	(Germany) No. 652 Adrenalin Motorsport Team Mainhattan Wheels						5^{5}					(10)
—	(China) Hu Heng (China) Jiang Jiawei (China) Yang Shuo	(Germany) No. 681 PTerting Sports by Up2Race				7^{2}	6^{3}						(10)
—	(United Kingdom) Ben Pitch	(Germany) No. 652 Adrenalin Motorsport Team Mainhattan Wheels									3^{8}		(8)
—	(Germany) Sebastian Brandl	(Germany) No. 651 Adrenalin Motorsport Team Mainhattan Wheels		2^{8}									(8)
—	(Germany) Jacob Erlbacher	(Germany) No. 651 Adrenalin Motorsport Team Mainhattan Wheels										2^{8}	(8)
—	(Belgium) Ugo de Wilde	(Germany) No. 651 Adrenalin Motorsport Team Mainhattan Wheels	3^{8}										(8)
—	(Belgium) Ugo de Wilde	(Germany) No. 652 Adrenalin Motorsport Team Mainhattan Wheels	p										(8)
—	(Germany) Hermann Vortkamp	(Germany) No. 651 Adrenalin Motorsport Team Mainhattan Wheels	3^{8}										(8)
—	(United Kingdom) Sam Weller	(Germany) No. 651 Adrenalin Motorsport Team Mainhattan Wheels					3^{8}						(8)
—	(Germany) Bernd Kuepper (Germany) Kevin Küpper	No. 664 (No Entry Name)						4^{8}	Ret	Ret			(8)
—	(Belgium) Dimitri Persoons	(Germany) No. 651 Adrenalin Motorsport Team Mainhattan Wheels			7^{2}								(8)
—	(Belgium) Dimitri Persoons	(Germany) No. 652 Adrenalin Motorsport Team Mainhattan Wheels					4^{6}						(8)
—	(Switzerland) Thomas Alpiger	No. 677 (No Entry Name)			12^{1}	5^{4}	WD			6^{3}			(8)
—	(Belgium) Hakan Sari (Belgium) Recep Sari	(Belgium) No. 658 JJ Motorsport	4^{6}		8^{1}								(7)
—	(Hong Kong) Li Guanghua (China) Zhang Zhiqiang	(Germany) No. 671 PTerting Sports by Up2Race				6^{3}	5^{4}						(7)
—	(Switzerland) Marco Grilli	No. 677 (No Entry Name)							5^{4}	6^{3}			(7)
—	(Germany) Finn Mache	(Singapore) No. 665 Giti Tire Motorsport by WS Racing	Ret	Ret	4^{6}								(6)
—	(Germany) Fabian Pirrone	(Singapore) No. 665 Giti Tire Motorsport by WS Racing		Ret	4^{6}								(6)
—	(Turkey) Ersin Yücesan	(Belgium) No. 658 JJ Motorsport	4^{6}										(6)
—	(Luxembourg) Johny Marechal	(Germany) No. 651 Adrenalin Motorsport Team Mainhattan Wheels				4^{6}							(6)
—	(Germany) Florian Ebener	(Germany) No. 652 Adrenalin Motorsport Team Mainhattan Wheels							4^{6}				(6)
—	(France) Grégoire Boutonnet (France) Laurent Laparra (Switzerland) Durim Kaliki	(Germany) No. 653 Adrenalin Motorsport Team Mainhattan Wheels									4^{6}		(6)
—	(Germany) Klaus Faßbender	(Germany) No. 652 Adrenalin Motorsport Team Mainhattan Wheels						5^{5}					(5)
—	(Switzerland) Michael Neuhauser (Germany) Henrik Seibel	No. 677 (No Entry Name)			12^{1}	5^{4}	WD						(5)
—	(Sweden) Andreas Christoffer Andersson	(Singapore) No. 665 Giti Tire Motorsport by WS Racing										4^{4}	(4)
—	(Switzerland) Pieder Decurtins	No. 677 (No Entry Name)							5^{4}				(4)
—	(Netherlands) Filip Hoenjet	(Germany) No. 652 Adrenalin Motorsport Team Mainhattan Wheels								5^{4}			(4)
—	(Germany) Niklas Ehrhardt	(Singapore) No. 665 Giti Tire Motorsport by WS Racing									5^{4}		(4)
—	(Ukraine) Leonid Petrov	(Germany) No. 652 Adrenalin Motorsport Team Mainhattan Wheels	6^{3}	Ret									(3)
—	(Ukraine) Leonid Petrov	(Germany) No. 653 Adrenalin Motorsport Team Mainhattan Wheels		WD									(3)
—	(Sweden) Viktor Larsson (Netherlands) Senna van Soelen (Canada) Adam Tang	(Germany) No. 652 Adrenalin Motorsport Team Mainhattan Wheels										5^{3}	(3)
—	(South Africa) David Perel	(Germany) No. 652 Adrenalin Motorsport Team Mainhattan Wheels	6^{3}										(3)
—	(Germany) Zoran Radulovic	(Germany) No. 660 Keeevin Sports and Racing			6^{3}								(3)
—	(Switzerland) Andreas Simon	(United Kingdom) No. 667 Breakell Racing			10^{1}						7^{2}		(3)
—	(Germany) Timo Kieslich (Germany) Wilhelm Kühne	(Germany) SR Motorsport by Schnitzelalm										6^{2}	(2)
—	(Germany) Valentin Lachenmayer	(Germany) No. 669 Keeevin Sports and Racing	7^{2}										(2)
—	(United Kingdom) Callum Davies	(United Kingdom) No. 667 Breakell Racing									7^{2}		(2)
—	(Germany) Marc Lehmann (Austria) Raphael Rennhofer	(Germany) No. 652 Adrenalin Motorsport Team Mainhattan Wheels			9^{1}								(1)
—	(United States) Gino Manley	(United Kingdom) No. 667 Breakell Racing			10^{1}								(1)
—	(Germany) John Lee Schambony	(Singapore) No. 665 Giti Tire Motorsport by WS Racing	Ret										—
—	(China) Kuang Can Wei	(Germany) No. 652 Adrenalin Motorsport Team Mainhattan Wheels		Ret									—
—	(Germany) Luca Link (Germany) Marvin Schiede	(Singapore) No. 665 Giti Tire Motorsport by WS Racing				Ret	WD						—
—	(Germany) Robert Hinzer (Germany) Matthias Möller	(Singapore) No. 665 Giti Tire Motorsport by WS Racing						Ret					—
Pos.	Driver	Team	NLS1	NLS2	NLS3	24H-Q		NLS6	NLS7	NLS8	NLS9	NLS10	Points

‡: Result not counted for classification

Colour	Result
Gold	Winner
Silver	Second place
Bronze	Third place
Green	Points classification
Blue	Non-points classification
Blue	Non-classified finish (NC)
Purple	Retired, not classified (Ret)
Red	Did not qualify (DNQ)
Red	Did not pre-qualify (DNPQ)
Black	Disqualified (DSQ)
White	Did not start (DNS)
White	Withdrew (WD)
White	Race cancelled (C)
Blank	Did not practice (DNP)
Blank	Did not arrive (DNA)
Blank	Excluded (EX)

===== BMW 325i =====
Pos.	Driver	Team	NLS1	NLS2	NLS3	24H-Q		NLS6	NLS7	NLS8	NLS9	NLS10	Points
1	(Israel) Moran Gott	(Germany) No. 107 SRS Team Sorg Rennsport	(4^{4})	1^{15}	1^{15}	1^{8}	1^{8}	1^{19}	1^{11}	(1^{8})	1^{11}	(1^{8})	87 (107)
2	(Germany) Eugen Becker	(Germany) No. 111 TEAM JSCompetition	1^{11}	3^{8}	Ret	2^{6}	2^{6}	2^{14}	2^{8}	2^{6}	Ret	(2^{6})	59 (65)
3	(Sweden) Dan Berghult (Germany) Oliver Frisse (Sweden) Juha Miettinen	(Germany) No. 130 Keeevin Sports and Racing	2^{8}	5^{4}	2^{11}	3^{4}	(3^{4})	3^{10}	3^{6}	(3^{4})	3^{6}	(4^{3})	49 (60)
6	(Germany) Manuel Dormagen	(Germany) No. 112 rent2Drive-racing	5^{3}	Ret	NC	4^{3}	4^{3}	4^{8}	6^{2}		2^{8}		27
7	(Germany) Sven Oepen	(Germany) No. 112 rent2Drive-racing	5^{3}	Ret	NC	4^{3}	4^{3}	4^{8}	6^{2}				19
8	(Germany) Thomas Ardelt	(Germany) No. 112 rent2Drive-racing	5^{3}	Ret		4^{3}‡	4^{3}				2^{8}		14
9	(Germany) Jürgen Huber (Germany) Simon Sagmeister (Germany) Dirk Vleugels	(Germany) No. 700 Team ifb by rent2Drive	3^{6}	4^{6}	Ret								12
12	(Germany) Alexander Müller	(Germany) No. 118 tm-racing.org			Ret								5
12	(Germany) Alexander Müller	(Germany) No. 121 TEAM JSCompetition						4^{5}			Ret		5
13	(Germany) Desiree Müller	No. 100 (No Entry Name)				5^{2}	5^{2}						4
14	(Germany) Jörg Schönfelder	(Germany) No. 120 Keeevin Sports and Racing										5^{2}	2
Non-championship entries
—	(Germany) Jonas Spölgen	(Germany) No. 111 TEAM JSCompetition	1^{11}	3^{8}	Ret	2^{6}	2^{6}	2^{14}	2^{8}	2^{6}	Ret	2^{6}	(65)
—	(Israel) Hagay Farran	(Germany) No. 107 SRS Team Sorg Rennsport				1^{8}	1^{8}	1^{19}					(35)
—	(Germany) Dr.Dr. Stein Tveten	(Germany) No. 116 Dr.Dr. Stein Tveten motorsport	Ret	2^{11}	Ret								(11)
—	(United States) Thomas Pendergrass	No. 100 (No Entry Name)				5^{2}	5^{2}						(10)
—	(United States) Thomas Pendergrass	(Germany) No. 101 EiFelkind Racing							5^{3}	4^{3}			(10)
—	(Poland) Damian Lempart	(Germany) No. 121 TEAM JSCompetition						4^{5}			Ret	3^{4}	(9)
—	(Germany) Nils Renken (Germany) Tim Schwolow (Germany) Heiko Weckenbrock	(Germany) No. 101 EiFelkind Racing						6^{4}			4^{4}		(8)
—	(United Kingdom) David Cox (United Kingdom) Joseph Moore	(Germany) No. 117 rent2Drive-racing						7^{3}	4^{4}	Ret			(7)
—	(Germany) Patrick Schueren (Germany) Paul Winter	(Germany) No. 101 EiFelkind Racing							5^{3}	4^{3}			(6)
—	(Poland) Michal Walczak-Makowiecki	(Germany) No. 121 TEAM JSCompetition						4^{5}			Ret		(5)
—	(Germany) Denis Robin Wolf (Switzerland) Flurin Zimmermann	(Germany) No. 121 TEAM JSCompetition										3^{4}	(4)
—	(Switzerland) Marc Arn	(Germany) No. 101 EiFelkind Racing						6^{4}					(4)
—	(Germany) Stefan Schäfer	No. 100 (No Entry Name)				5^{2}	5^{2}						(4)
—	(Germany) Stefan Schäfer	(Germany) No. 101 EiFelkind Racing		Ret									(4)
—	(Germany) Karsten Welker	No. 100 (No Entry Name)				5^{2}	DNS						(2)
—	(Germany) Karsten Welker	(Germany) No. 101 EiFelkind Racing		Ret									(2)
—	(Germany) Jan Soumagne	(Germany) No. 120 Keeevin Sports and Racing										5^{2}	(2)
—	(Germany) Yannick Fübrich	(Germany) No. 116 Dr.Dr. Stein Tveten motorsport	Ret		Ret								—
—	(Germany) Mats Heidler	(Germany) No. 101 EiFelkind Racing		Ret	Ret								—
—	(Germany) Christoph Merkt (Germany) Moritz Rosenbach	(Germany) No. 101 EiFelkind Racing			Ret								—
—	(Germany) Christian Weber (Germany) Jan Weber	(Germany) No. 118 tm-racing.org			Ret								—
—	(Germany) Zoran Radulovic (Germany) Robin Reimer (Germany) Jörg Schauer (Germany) Jens Schneider	(Germany) No. 123 Keeevin Sports and Racing						Ret					—
Pos.	Driver	Team	NLS1	NLS2	NLS3	24H-Q		NLS6	NLS7	NLS8	NLS9	NLS10	Points

‡: Result not counted for classification

Colour	Result
Gold	Winner
Silver	Second place
Bronze	Third place
Green	Points classification
Blue	Non-points classification
Blue	Non-classified finish (NC)
Purple	Retired, not classified (Ret)
Red	Did not qualify (DNQ)
Red	Did not pre-qualify (DNPQ)
Black	Disqualified (DSQ)
White	Did not start (DNS)
White	Withdrew (WD)
White	Race cancelled (C)
Blank	Did not practice (DNP)
Blank	Did not arrive (DNA)
Blank	Excluded (EX)

===== H2 =====
Pos.	Driver	Team	NLS1	NLS2	NLS3	24H-Q	NLS6	NLS7	NLS8	NLS9	NLS10	Points
1	(Germany) Mark Giesbrecht	No. 611 (No Entry Name)		Ret			1^{3}	1^{2}			1^{3}	8
Non-championship entries
—	(Germany) Frank Kuhlmann	No. 611 (No Entry Name)		Ret			1^{3}	1^{2}			1^{3}	(8)
—	(Germany) Michael Flehmer	No. 611 (No Entry Name)		Ret			1^{3}					(3)
—	(Germany) Roman Schiemenz (Germany) Matthias Wasel	(Germany) No. 620 SFG Schönau e.V. im ADAC									2^{2}	(2)
Pos.	Driver	Team	NLS1	NLS2	NLS3	24H-Q	NLS6	NLS7	NLS8	NLS9	NLS10	Points

‡: Result not counted for classification

Colour	Result
Gold	Winner
Silver	Second place
Bronze	Third place
Green	Points classification
Blue	Non-points classification
Blue	Non-classified finish (NC)
Purple	Retired, not classified (Ret)
Red	Did not qualify (DNQ)
Red	Did not pre-qualify (DNPQ)
Black	Disqualified (DSQ)
White	Did not start (DNS)
White	Withdrew (WD)
White	Race cancelled (C)
Blank	Did not practice (DNP)
Blank	Did not arrive (DNA)
Blank	Excluded (EX)

=== Teams Classifications ===
==== NLS Speed-Trophäe (Overall) ====
Displaying entries that has achieved top 20 finish and/or top 3 qualifying in at least 1 round.

Pos.	Team	Class	NLS1	NLS2	NLS3	24H-Q		NLS6	NLS7	NLS8	NLS9	NLS10	Points
1	(Germany) No. 3 Falken Motorsports	SP9 Pro	1	1^{2}	3	Ret	2	1	1^{1}	Ret		2	226
2	(Germany) No. 4 Falken Motorsports	SP9 Pro	2	5^{3}	4	5	Ret	2^{1}	2^{2}	2^{2}		1	217
3	(Germany) No. 6 HRT Ford Performance	SP9 Pro	12		11			3	Ret	1^{1}	3	3^{2}	145
3	(Germany) No. 6 HRT Ford Performance	SP9 Pro-Am		10									145
4	(Belgium) No. 921 Mühlner Motorsport	CUP2	13	9	12	7	32	6	8	8	6	5	129
5	(Germany) No. 911 Manthey EMA	SP9 Pro	3		1^{1}	2^{1}	3						119
6	(Germany) No. 948 48 LOSCH Motorsport by Black Falcon	CUP2	14	11	13	Ret	DNS	7^{3}	7	7	7	Ret	90
7	(Lithuania) No. 8 Juta Racing	SP9 Pro-Am	10^{1}	7^{1}		8	Ret	DNS	Ret	4	Ret^{2}	7	87
8	(Germany) No. 901 SRS Team Sorg Rennsport	CUP2	16	83	18	34	16	10	10	9	9	6	77
9	(Italy) No. 54 Dinamic GT	SP9 Pro	4	Ret	7	4	7				Ret		76
10	(Germany) No. 900 Black Falcon Team Zimmermann	CUP2	17	14	15			11	11	10	12	11	67
11	(Thailand) No. 786 Renazzo Motorsport Team	SP9 Am	Ret	Ret	65			5	6	Ret	8	9	64
12	(Germany) No. 98 Rowe Racing	SP9 Pro	5	3									45
13	(Germany) No. 909 KKrämer Racing	CUP2	DSQ	19	14	DNS	Ret	12	48	11	11	15	44
14	(Germany) No. 27 Red Bull Team ABT	SP9 Pro	7		52	Ret	5^{3}						37
15	(Germany) No. 929 KKrämer Racing	CUP2	Ret	12	25	15	12	9	Ret				36
16	(Germany) No. 50 équipe vitesse	SP9 Am	Ret	15	26	Ret	81	DSQ	9	12	14	24	34
17	(Germany) No. 187 FK Performance Motorsport	SP10	22										32
17	(Germany) No. 187 FK Performance Motorsport	SP8T		24	22	12	13	14	18	17	20	21	32
17	(Germany) No. 959 SRS Team Sorg Rennsport	CUP3	20	17	DNS	11	14	33	13	Ret	19	Ret	32
19	(Germany) No. 15 Scherer Sport PHX	SP9 Pro	8		9^{3}	Ret^{2}	DNS						29
20	(Germany) No. 150 Team Bilstein by Black Falconn	SP8T	24	26	24	14	15	17				14	24
21	(Belgium) No. 904 Mühlner Motorsport	CUP2	42	21	21	40	24	8	12	Ret	23	33	23
21	(Germany) No. 962 W&S Motorsport	CUP3	67	Ret	29			16	14	22	18	13	23
23	(Germany) No. 165 AVIA W&S Motorsport	SP10	23	25	Ret			18	70	16	36		22
23	(Germany) No. 165 AVIA W&S Motorsport	SP7										8	22
24	(Germany) No. 910 Smyrlis Racing	CUP2	27	32	19			20	15	15	17	26	19
25	(Germany) No. 644 Max Kruse Racing	AT 2	15	13	17								18
26	(Germany) No. 940 Adrenalin Motorsport Team Mainhattan Wheels	CUP3	21	20	Ret	13	18	Ret	17	Ret		62	16
27	(Germany) No. 69 Dörr Motorsport	SP9 Pro-Am	DSQ^{3}		8								15
28	(Germany) No. 155 Plusline Motorsport	SP8T	44	42	33	17	27	21	20	20	30	31	6
29	(Belgium) No. 939 Mühlner Motorsport	CUP3	39	27	30	42	46	32	33	28	Ret	16	5
30	(Germany) No. 10 Max Kruse Racing	AT 3	Ret	30	Ret			39	28	25	28	17	4
31	(Armenia) No. 777 Goroyan RT by sharky-racing	TCR	43	54	Ret	29	38	43	24	29	63	18	3
32	(Germany) No. 912 KKrämer Racing	CUP2	19	Ret	40	Ret	35						2
32	(Germany) No. 950 Schmickler Performance powered by Ravenol	CUP3	25	33	32			24	22	19	25	78	2
34	(Germany) No. 927 Max Kruse Racing	CUP2		23	20								1
34	(Germany) No. 941 Adrenalin Motorsport Team Mainhattan Wheels	CUP3	32	41	36	56	28	28	23	23	32	20	1
Non-championship entries
—	(Germany) No. 34 Walkenhorst Motorsport	SP9 Pro		2	5	Ret	Ret						(113)
—	(Germany) No. 34 Walkenhorst Motorsport	SP9 Pro-Am							4	5	5^{1}		(113)
—	(Germany) No. 16 Scherer Sport PHX	SP9 Pro		4	6	1	1^{2}						(112)
—	(Germany) No. 48 Black Falcon Team EAE	SP9 Pro-Am	9	Ret		Ret	9	4^{2}					(102)
—	(Germany) No. 48 Black Falcon Team EAE	SP9 Am							3^{2}	3^{2}			(102)
—	(Germany) No. 14 Mercedes-AMG Team GetSpeed	SP9 Pro	Ret		2^{2}	3	4^{1}						(80)
—	(Germany) No. 9 HRT Ford Performance	SP9 Pro									2		(53)
—	(Germany) No. 9 HRT Ford Performance	SP9 Pro-Am										4^{1}	(53)
—	(Japan) No. 45 Realize Kondo Racing with Rinaldi	SP9 Pro	11	6	93	Ret^{3}	8						(43)
—	(Germany) No. 44 Car Collection Motorsport	SP9 Pro-Am							5^{3}	6^{1}			(42)
—	(Switzerland) No. 31 Emil Frey Racing	SP9 Pro									1^{3}		(36)
—	(Germany) No. 17 Mercedes-AMG Team GetSpeed	SP9 Pro	6			Ret	6						(36)
—	(South Korea) No. 30 Hankook Competition	SP9 Pro-Am		Ret	16	6	10					Ret	(34)
—	(Germany) No. 919 Team Clickversicherung	CUP2	DSQ	18	23	20	19	13	NC	14	16		(26)
—	(Germany) No. 347 Toyo Tires with Ring Racing	SP-Pro	18	Ret	Ret			82			10	10	(25)
—	(Germany) No. 22 Max Kruse Racing	AT 1									4	Ret^{3}	(23)
—	(South Korea) No. 830 Hyundai Motorsport N	TCR				9	17						(16)
—	(Germany) No. 35 Walkenhorst Motorsport	SP9 Pro-Am		16		Ret	11						(15)
—	(Germany) No. 2 HRT Ford Performance	SP9 Pro	DNS	8	WD								(14)
—	(Austria) No. 84 Eastalent Racing Team	SP9 Pro				10	Ret						(11)
—	(Germany) No. 11 SR Motorsport by Schnitzelalm	SP9 Pro-Am			10								(11)
—	(Germany) No. 718 Manthey Team eFuel Griesemann	AT 2		22	Ret	19	33		Ret	13			(10)
—	(Germany) No. 944 Team 9und11	CUP2	DSQ	28	Ret			23	16	18	24	19	(10)
—	(Germany) No. 905 PTerting Sports by Up2Race	CUP2										12	(9)
—	(Germany) No. 21 Frikadelli Racing Team	SP9 Am							Ret	Ret	13		(8)
—	(Germany) No. 78 RPM Racing	SP7		Ret				15	21	21			(6)
—	(Germany) No. 25 Huber Motorsport	SP9 Am									15		(6)
—	(Germany) No. 66 ME Motorsport	SP8T				16	Ret						(5)
—	(South Korea) No. 831 Hyundai Motorsport N	TCR				18	23						(3)
—	(Germany) No. 36 Walkenhorst Motorsport	SP9 Pro-Am	DSQ^{2}		Ret								(3)
—	(Germany) No. 36 Walkenhorst Motorsport	SP9 Am		NC		Ret	20						(3)
—	(Germany) No. 906 pb performance	CUP2		29	31	Ret	31	19			27	42	(2)
—	(Germany) No. 70 Black Falcon Team ZIMMERMANN	SP7	Ret	34	45	24	26	Ret	19	Ret	29	37	(2)

‡: Result not counted for classification

Colour	Result
Gold	Winner
Silver	Second place
Bronze	Third place
Green	Points classification
Blue	Non-points classification
Blue	Non-classified finish (NC)
Purple	Retired, not classified (Ret)
Red	Did not qualify (DNQ)
Red	Did not pre-qualify (DNPQ)
Black	Disqualified (DSQ)
White	Did not start (DNS)
White	Withdrew (WD)
White	Race cancelled (C)
Blank	Did not practice (DNP)
Blank	Did not arrive (DNA)
Blank	Excluded (EX)

^{1} ^{2} ^{3}– Points-scoring position in qualifying

==== GOODYEAR Award ====
Points are awarded to teams using Goodyear tires based on their finishing position within their class, based on the following distribution.

PIC	1st	2nd	3rd	4th	5th	6th	7th	8th	9th	10th	11th	12th	13th	14th	15th	16th	17th	18th	19th	20th
Points	20	19	18	17	16	15	14	13	12	11	10	9	8	7	6	5	4	3	2	1

Pos.	Team	Class	NLS1	NLS2	NLS3	24H-Q		NLS6	NLS7	NLS8	NLS9	NLS10	Points
1	(Germany) No. 680 PTerting Sports by Up2Race	BMW M240i	5	3	5	8	2	2	1	2	1	3	178
2	(Germany) No. 651 Adrenalin Motorsport Team Mainhattan Wheels	BMW M240i	3	2	7	4	3	6	2	4	2	2	175
3	(Armenia) No. 777 Goroyan RT by sharky-racing	TCR	1	2	Ret	3	3	1	1	1	3	1	173
4	(Germany) No. 470 Auto Thomas by Jung Motorsport	VT2-F+4WD	2	4	3	4	Ret	4	3	3	2	1	163
5	(Germany) No. 1 Adrenalin Motorsport Team Mainhattan Wheels	BMW M240i	1	1	1	1	1	1	Ret	Ret	6	1	155
6	(Germany) No. 111 JS Competition	BMW 325i	1	3	Ret	2	2	2	2	2	Ret	2	152
7	(Germany) No. 480 Dupré Engineering	VT2-F+4WD	8	1	Ret	3	4	1	DSQ	1	1	2	147
8	(Germany) No. 652 Adrenalin Motorsport Team Mainhattan Wheels	BMW M240i	6	Ret	9	3	4	5	4	5	3	5	145
9	(Germany) No. 50 équipe vitesse	SP9 Am	Ret	1	1	Ret	2	DSQ	3	2	3	2	133
10	(Germany) No. 175 PROsport-Racing	SP10	3			1	1	2	3	Ret	Ret		131
10	(Germany) No. 175 PROsport-Racing	SP8T		3	3							Ret	131
11	(Switzerland) No. 189 Hofor Racing by Bonk Motorsport	SP8T	Ret	9	6	6	4	5	6	6	Ret	4	122
12	(Lithuania) No. 8 Juta Racing	SP9 Pro-Am	2	1		2	Ret	DNS	Ret	1	2	2	116
13	(Germany) No. 808 asBest Racing	TCR		3	2	4	4	2	3				108
14	(Germany) No. 460 Keeevin Sports and Racing	VT3	1	NC	DNS			1	1	1	1		100
15	(Thailand) No. 786 Renazzo Motorsport Team	SP9 Am	Ret	Ret	2			1	2	Ret	1	1	98
16	(Norway) No. 801 Møller Bil Motorsport	TCR		1	1				2		2	2	97
17	(Germany) No. 633 Four Motors Bioconcept-Car	AT 3		3					3	2			55
18	(Germany) No. 420 Four Motors Bioconcept-Car	AT 3		5				3	NC			2	53
19	(Germany) No. 320 Four Motors Bioconcept-Car	AT 2		3					1				38
20	(Germany) No. 700 Team ifb by rent2Drive	BMW 325i	3	4	Ret								35
21	(Germany) No. 112 rent2Drive-racing	BMW 325i				4	4						34
22	(Germany) No. 116 Dr.Dr. Stein Tveten motorsport	BMW 325i	Ret	2	Ret								19
23	(Germany) No. 155 Plusline Motorsport	SP8T										3	18
Pos.	Team	Class	NLS1	NLS2	NLS3	24H-Q		NLS6	NLS7	NLS8	NLS9	NLS10	Points

‡: Result not counted for classification

Colour	Result
Gold	Winner
Silver	Second place
Bronze	Third place
Green	Points classification
Blue	Non-points classification
Blue	Non-classified finish (NC)
Purple	Retired, not classified (Ret)
Red	Did not qualify (DNQ)
Red	Did not pre-qualify (DNPQ)
Black	Disqualified (DSQ)
White	Did not start (DNS)
White	Withdrew (WD)
White	Race cancelled (C)
Blank	Did not practice (DNP)
Blank	Did not arrive (DNA)
Blank	Excluded (EX)

==== KW-Team-Trophäe ====
===== SP9 =====
====== Pro ======
Pos.	Team	Vehicle	NLS1	NLS2	NLS3	24H-Q		NLS6	NLS7	NLS8	NLS9	NLS10	Points
1	(Germany) No. 3 Falken Motorsports	Porsche 911 GT3 R (992)	1	1	3	Ret	2	1	1	Ret		2	221
2	(Germany) No. 4 Falken Motorsports	Porsche 911 GT3 R (992)	2	5	4	5	Ret	2	2	2		1	209
3	(Germany) No. 6 HRT Ford Performance	Ford Mustang GT3	10		9			3	Ret	1	3	3	133
4	(Germany) No. 911 Manthey Racing EMA	Porsche 911 GT3 R (992)	3		1	2	3						113
5	(Italy) No. 54 Dinamic GT	Porsche 911 GT3 R (992)	4	Ret	7	4	7				Ret		76
6	(Germany) No. 27 Red Bull Team ABT	Lamborghini Huracan GT3 Evo2	7		10	Ret	5						47
7	(Germany) No. 98 Rowe Racing	BMW M4 GT3 Evo	5	3									45
8	(Germany) No. 15 Scherer Sport PHX	Audi R8 LMS Evo II	8		8	Ret							28
Non-championship entries
—	(Germany) No. 16 Scherer Sport PHX	Porsche 911 GT3 R (992)		4	6	1	1						(110)
—	(Germany) No. 14 Mercedes-AMG Team GetSpeed	Mercedes-AMG GT3 Evo	Ret		2	3	4						(75)
—	(Germany) No. 34 Walkenhorst Motorsport	Aston Martin Vantage AMR GT3 Evo		2	5	Ret	Ret						(48)
—	(Japan) No. 45 Realize Kondo Racing with Rinaldi	Ferrari 296 GT3	9	6		Ret	8						(44)
—	(Germany) No. 17 Mercedes-AMG Team GetSpeed	Mercedes-AMG GT3 Evo	6	WD		Ret	6						(36)
—	(Switzerland) No. 31 Emil Frey Racing	Ferrari 296 GT3									1		(35)
—	(Germany) No. 9 HRT Ford Performance	Ford Mustang GT3									2		(28)
—	(Austria) No. 84 Eastalent Racing Team	Audi R8 LMS Evo II				6	Ret						(18)
—	(Germany) No. 2 HRT Ford Performance	Ford Mustang GT3	DNS	7	WD								(16)
—	(Austria) No. 7 Konrad Motorsport	Lamborghini Huracan GT3 Evo	Ret										—
Pos.	Team	Vehicle	NLS1	NLS2	NLS3	24H-Q		NLS6	NLS7	NLS8	NLS9	NLS10	Points

‡: Result not counted for classification

Colour	Result
Gold	Winner
Silver	Second place
Bronze	Third place
Green	Points classification
Blue	Non-points classification
Blue	Non-classified finish (NC)
Purple	Retired, not classified (Ret)
Red	Did not qualify (DNQ)
Red	Did not pre-qualify (DNPQ)
Black	Disqualified (DSQ)
White	Did not start (DNS)
White	Withdrew (WD)
White	Race cancelled (C)
Blank	Did not practice (DNP)
Blank	Did not arrive (DNA)
Blank	Excluded (EX)

====== Pro-Am ======
Pos.	Team	Vehicle	NLS1	NLS2	NLS3	24H-Q		NLS6	NLS7	NLS8	NLS9	NLS10	Points
1	(Lithuania) No. 8 Juta Racing	Audi R8 LMS Evo II	2	1		2	Ret	DNS	Ret	1	2	2	182
2	(Germany) No. 69 Dörr Motorsport	McLaren 720S GT3 Evo	DSQ		1								35
3	(Germany) No. 6 HRT Ford Performance	Ford Mustang GT3		2									28
Non-championship entries
—	(Germany) No. 48 Black Falcon Team EAE	Porsche 911 GT3 R (992)	1	Ret		5	1	1					(125)
—	(Germany) No. 34 Walkenhorst Motorsport	Aston Martin Vantage AMR GT3 Evo							1	2	1		(98)
—	(South Korea) No. 30 Hankook Competition	Porsche 911 GT3 R (992)		Ret	3	1	2					Ret	(88)
—	(Germany) No. 35 Walkenhorst Motorsport	Aston Martin Vantage AMR GT3 Evo		3		3	3						(75)
—	(Germany) No. 44 Car Collection Motorsport	Porsche 911 GT3 R (992)							1	3			(60)
—	(Germany) No. 9 HRT Ford Performance	Ford Mustang GT3										1	(35)
—	(Germany) No. 11 SR Motorsport by Schnitzelalm	Mercedes-AMG GT3 Evo			2								(28)
—	(Germany) No. 37 PROsport-Racing	Aston Martin Vantage AMR GT3				4	WD						(22)
—	(Japan) No. 45 Realize Kondo Racing with Rinaldi	Ferrari 296 GT3			4								(22)
—	(Austria) No. 7 Konrad Motorsport	Lamborghini Huracan GT3 Evo		Ret									—
—	(Germany) No. 36 Walkenhorst Motorsport	Aston Martin Vantage AMR GT3 Evo	DSQ		Ret								—
Pos.	Team	Vehicle	NLS1	NLS2	NLS3	24H-Q		NLS6	NLS7	NLS8	NLS9	NLS10	Points

‡: Result not counted for classification

Colour	Result
Gold	Winner
Silver	Second place
Bronze	Third place
Green	Points classification
Blue	Non-points classification
Blue	Non-classified finish (NC)
Purple	Retired, not classified (Ret)
Red	Did not qualify (DNQ)
Red	Did not pre-qualify (DNPQ)
Black	Disqualified (DSQ)
White	Did not start (DNS)
White	Withdrew (WD)
White	Race cancelled (C)
Blank	Did not practice (DNP)
Blank	Did not arrive (DNA)
Blank	Excluded (EX)

====== Am ======
Pos.	Team	Vehicle	NLS1	NLS2	NLS3	24H-Q		NLS6	NLS7	NLS8	NLS9	NLS10	Points
1	(Germany) No. 50 équipe vitesse	Audi R8 LMS Evo II	Ret	1	1	Ret	2	DSQ	3	2	2	3	204
2	(Thailand) No. 786 Renazzo Motorsport Team	Lamborghini Huracan GT3 Evo2	Ret	Ret	2			1	2	Ret	1	1	161
Non-championship entries
—	(Germany) No. 48 Black Falcon Team EAE	Porsche 911 GT3 R (992)							1	1			(70)
—	(Germany) No. 36 Walkenhorst Motorsport	Aston Martin Vantage AMR GT3 Evo		NC		Ret	1						(35)
—	(Germany) No. 21 Frikadelli Racing Team	Ferrari 296 GT3							Ret	Ret	2		(28)
—	(Germany) No. 25 Huber Motorsport	Porsche 911 GT3 R (992)									4		(22)
Pos.	Team	Vehicle	NLS1	NLS2	NLS3	24H-Q		NLS6	NLS7	NLS8	NLS9	NLS10	Points

‡: Result not counted for classification

Colour	Result
Gold	Winner
Silver	Second place
Bronze	Third place
Green	Points classification
Blue	Non-points classification
Blue	Non-classified finish (NC)
Purple	Retired, not classified (Ret)
Red	Did not qualify (DNQ)
Red	Did not pre-qualify (DNPQ)
Black	Disqualified (DSQ)
White	Did not start (DNS)
White	Withdrew (WD)
White	Race cancelled (C)
Blank	Did not practice (DNP)
Blank	Did not arrive (DNA)
Blank	Excluded (EX)

===== SP10 =====
Pos.	Team	Vehicle	NLS1	NLS2	NLS3	24H-Q		NLS6	NLS7	NLS8	NLS9	NLS10	Points
1	(Germany) No. 165 AVIA W&S Motorsport	Porsche 718 Cayman GT4 RS Clubsport	2	1	Ret			1	4	1	1		190
2	(Germany) No. 175 PROsport-Racing	Aston Martin Vantage AMR GT4	3			1	1	2	3	Ret	Ret		148
3	(Germany) No. 170 Toyo Tires with Ring Racing	Toyota GR Supra GT4 Evo	4	3	1	3	2						135
4	(Germany) No. 164 W&S Motorsport	Porsche 718 Cayman GT4 RS Clubsport	5	2	2			5	Ret	4	Ret		118
5	(Germany) No. 187 FK Performance Motorsport	BMW M4 GT4 (G82)	1										35
Non-championship entries
—	(Germany) No. 191 Walkenhorst Motorsport	Aston Martin Vantage AMR GT4		Ret	Ret	4	4	4	2	3			(119)
—	(Germany) No. 163 AV Racing by Black Falcon	BMW M4 GT4 (G82)						3	1	2			(88)
—	(Germany) No. 162 AV Racing by Black Falcon	BMW M4 GT4 (G82)			3	2	3						(72)
—	(Sweden) No. 190 (No Entry Name)	Toyota GR Supra GT4 Evo							5	5			(40)
—	(United Kingdom) No. 180 Barton Racing	Toyota GR Supra GT4 Evo	6										(18)
Pos.	Team	Vehicle	NLS1	NLS2	NLS3	24H-Q		NLS6	NLS7	NLS8	NLS9	NLS10	Points

‡: Result not counted for classification

Colour	Result
Gold	Winner
Silver	Second place
Bronze	Third place
Green	Points classification
Blue	Non-points classification
Blue	Non-classified finish (NC)
Purple	Retired, not classified (Ret)
Red	Did not qualify (DNQ)
Red	Did not pre-qualify (DNPQ)
Black	Disqualified (DSQ)
White	Did not start (DNS)
White	Withdrew (WD)
White	Race cancelled (C)
Blank	Did not practice (DNP)
Blank	Did not arrive (DNA)
Blank	Excluded (EX)

===== SP8T =====
Pos.	Team	Vehicle	NLS1	NLS2	NLS3	24H-Q		NLS6	NLS7	NLS8	NLS9	NLS10	Points
1	(Germany) No. 155 Plusline Motorsport	BMW M4 GT4 (G82)	4	7	4	4	3	3	2	2	3	3	238
2	(Germany) No. 150 Team Bilstein by Black Falcon	BMW M4 GT4 Evo (G82)	1	2	2	2	2	2				1	210
3	(Singapore) No. 146 Giti Tire Motorsport by WS Racing	BMW M4 GT4 (G82)	Ret	6	8				3‡	3‡	5‡		32 (102)
Non-championship entries
—	(Germany) No. 187 FK Performance Motorsport	BMW M4 GT4 (G82)		1	1	1	1	1	1	1	1	2	(308)
—	(Switzerland) No. 189 Hofor Racing by Bonk Motorsport	BMW M4 GT4 (G82)	Ret	9	6	6	4	5	6	6	Ret	4	(148)
—	(Germany) No. 140 PROsport-Racing	Aston Martin Vantage AMR GT8R	3	8	5			Ret	4	Ret	6	DNS	(99)
—	(Germany) No. 160 Toyo Tires with Ring Racing	Toyota GR Supra GT4 Evo	2			5	5	6	Ret	Ret			(86)
—	(Hong Kong) No. 172 KCMG	Toyota GR Supra GT4 Evo2							5	4	7		(58)
—	(Germany) No. 175 PROsport-Racing	Aston Martin Vantage AMR GT8R		3	3							Ret	(50)
—	(Hong Kong) No. 173 KCMG	Toyota GR Supra GT4 Evo2							7	5	8		(50)
—	(Germany) No. 191 PROsport-Racing	Aston Martin Vantage AMR GT8R									2		(28)
—	(Germany) No. 66 ME Motorsport	BMW M4 GT4 (G82)				3	Ret						(25)
—	(Japan) No. 110 Toyota Gazoo Rookie Racing	Toyota GR Supra GT4 Evo2		4									(22)
—	(Switzerland) No. 188 Hofor Racing by Bonk Motorsport	BMW M4 GT4 (G82)						4					(22)
—	(Germany) No. 170 Toyo Tires with Ring Racing	Toyota GR Supra GT4 Evo									4		(22)
—	(Canada) No. 158 ST Racing	BMW M4 GT4 (G82)		5									(20)
—	(Germany) No. 144 SR Motorsport by Schnitzelalm	Mercedes-AMG GT4										5	(20)
—	(Japan) No. 173 Toyota Gazoo Racing	Toyota GR Supra GT4 Evo2	DSQ		7								(16)
—	(Japan) No. 172 Toyota Gazoo Racing	Toyota GR Supra GT4 Evo2	DSQ		9								(12)
—	(Belgium) No. 141 (No Entry Name)	BMW M235i Racing			10								(11)
—	(Germany) No. 188 FK Performance Motorsport	BMW M4 GT4 (G82)				Ret	Ret						—
Pos.	Team	Vehicle	NLS1	NLS2	NLS3	24H-Q		NLS6	NLS7	NLS8	NLS9	NLS10	Points

‡: Result not counted for classification

Colour	Result
Gold	Winner
Silver	Second place
Bronze	Third place
Green	Points classification
Blue	Non-points classification
Blue	Non-classified finish (NC)
Purple	Retired, not classified (Ret)
Red	Did not qualify (DNQ)
Red	Did not pre-qualify (DNPQ)
Black	Disqualified (DSQ)
White	Did not start (DNS)
White	Withdrew (WD)
White	Race cancelled (C)
Blank	Did not practice (DNP)
Blank	Did not arrive (DNA)
Blank	Excluded (EX)

===== AT 2 =====
Pos.	Team	Vehicle	NLS1	NLS2	NLS3	24H-Q		NLS6	NLS7	NLS8	NLS9	NLS10	Points
1	(Germany) No. 644 Max Kruse Racing	Porsche 911 GT3 Cup (992)	1	1	1								105
2	(Germany) No. 320 Four Motors Bioconcept-Car	Porsche 911 GT3 Cup (992)		3					1				60
Non-championship entries
—	(Germany) No. 718 Manthey Team eFuel Griesemann	Porsche 718 Cayman GT4 RS CS M		2	Ret	1	1		Ret	1			(133)
Pos.	Team	Vehicle	NLS1	NLS2	NLS3	24H-Q		NLS6	NLS7	NLS8	NLS9	NLS10	Points

‡: Result not counted for classification

Colour	Result
Gold	Winner
Silver	Second place
Bronze	Third place
Green	Points classification
Blue	Non-points classification
Blue	Non-classified finish (NC)
Purple	Retired, not classified (Ret)
Red	Did not qualify (DNQ)
Red	Did not pre-qualify (DNPQ)
Black	Disqualified (DSQ)
White	Did not start (DNS)
White	Withdrew (WD)
White	Race cancelled (C)
Blank	Did not practice (DNP)
Blank	Did not arrive (DNA)
Blank	Excluded (EX)

===== AT 3 =====
Pos.	Team	Vehicle	NLS1	NLS2	NLS3	24H-Q		NLS6	NLS7	NLS8	NLS9	NLS10	Points
1	(Germany) No. 10 Max Kruse Racing	Audi RS 3 LMS TCR (2021)	Ret	1	Ret			2	1	1	1	1	203
2	(Germany) No. 333 Max Kruse Racing	Audi RS 3 LMS TCR (2021)	1						2	Ret	2		91
3	(Germany) No. 633 Four Motors Bioconcept-Car	Porsche 718 Cayman GT4 RS Clubsport		3					3	2			78
4	(Germany) No. 420 Four Motors Bioconcept-Car	Porsche 718 Cayman GT4 RS Clubsport		5				3	NC			2	73
Non-championship entries
—	(Singapore) No. 146 Giti Tire Motorsport by WS Racing	BMW M4 GT4 (G82)				1	1	1					(105)
—	(Germany) No. 819 Max Kruse Racing	Volkswagen Golf GTI TCR	3	6	1								(78)
—	(Germany) No. 76 Max Kruse Racing	Volkswagen Golf GTI Clubsport 24h	2	2	Ret								(56)
—	(Germany) No. 33 Max Kruse Racing	Volkswagen Golf GTI TCR		4									(22)
—	(China) No. 827 Fancy Motorsport	Lynk & Co. 03 TCR				Ret	Ret						—
Pos.	Team	Vehicle	NLS1	NLS2	NLS3	24H-Q		NLS6	NLS7	NLS8	NLS9	NLS10	Points

‡: Result not counted for classification

Colour	Result
Gold	Winner
Silver	Second place
Bronze	Third place
Green	Points classification
Blue	Non-points classification
Blue	Non-classified finish (NC)
Purple	Retired, not classified (Ret)
Red	Did not qualify (DNQ)
Red	Did not pre-qualify (DNPQ)
Black	Disqualified (DSQ)
White	Did not start (DNS)
White	Withdrew (WD)
White	Race cancelled (C)
Blank	Did not practice (DNP)
Blank	Did not arrive (DNA)
Blank	Excluded (EX)

===== TCR =====
Pos.	Team	Vehicle	NLS1	NLS2	NLS3	24H-Q		NLS6	NLS7	NLS8	NLS9	NLS10	Points
1	(Armenia) No. 777 Goroyan RT by sharky-racing	Audi RS 3 LMS TCR (2021)	1	2	Ret	3	3	1	1	1	3	1	278
2	(Norway) No. 801 Møller Bil Motorsport	Audi RS 3 LMS TCR (2021)		1	1				2		2	2	154
3	(Germany) No. 808 asBest Racing	Cupra León TCR		3	2	4	4	2	3				150
Non-championship entries
—	(South Korea) No. 831 Hyundai N Motorsport	Hyundai Elantra N TCR (2024)		4		2	2						(78)
—	(South Korea) No. 830 Hyundai N Motorsport	Hyundai Elantra N TCR (2024)				1	1						(70)
—	(Estonia) No. 800 ALM Motorsport	Honda Civic Type R TCR (FL5)									1		(35)
Pos.	Team	Vehicle	NLS1	NLS2	NLS3	24H-Q		NLS6	NLS7	NLS8	NLS9	NLS10	Points

‡: Result not counted for classification

Colour	Result
Gold	Winner
Silver	Second place
Bronze	Third place
Green	Points classification
Blue	Non-points classification
Blue	Non-classified finish (NC)
Purple	Retired, not classified (Ret)
Red	Did not qualify (DNQ)
Red	Did not pre-qualify (DNPQ)
Black	Disqualified (DSQ)
White	Did not start (DNS)
White	Withdrew (WD)
White	Race cancelled (C)
Blank	Did not practice (DNP)
Blank	Did not arrive (DNA)
Blank	Excluded (EX)

===== V6 =====
Pos.	Team	Vehicle	NLS1	NLS2	NLS3	24H-Q		NLS6	NLS7	NLS8	NLS9	NLS10	Points
1	(Germany) No. 396 Adrenalin Motorsport Team Mainhattan Wheels	Porsche Cayman S	1	1	1	1	1	2	1	1	2	1	336
2	(Germany) No. 410 rent2Drive-racing	Porsche Cayman GTS	2	3	4	2	2		Ret	2‡	3‡	4‡	56 (131)
Non-championship entries
—	(Germany) No. 400 Schmickler Performance powered by Ravenol	Porsche 911 Carrera		2	2			1			1	2	(154)
—	(Germany) No. 414 (No Entry Name)	Porsche 911			3	3	3	3					(100)
—	(Germany) No. 409 KKrämer Racing	Porsche Cayman S			Ret								—
—	(Germany) No. 415 (No Entry Name)	Porsche 911										3	(25)
Pos.	Team	Vehicle	NLS1	NLS2	NLS3	24H-Q		NLS6	NLS7	NLS8	NLS9	NLS10	Points

‡: Result not counted for classification

Colour	Result
Gold	Winner
Silver	Second place
Bronze	Third place
Green	Points classification
Blue	Non-points classification
Blue	Non-classified finish (NC)
Purple	Retired, not classified (Ret)
Red	Did not qualify (DNQ)
Red	Did not pre-qualify (DNPQ)
Black	Disqualified (DSQ)
White	Did not start (DNS)
White	Withdrew (WD)
White	Race cancelled (C)
Blank	Did not practice (DNP)
Blank	Did not arrive (DNA)
Blank	Excluded (EX)

===== V5 =====
Pos.	Team	Vehicle	NLS1	NLS2	NLS3	24H-Q		NLS6	NLS7	NLS8	NLS9	NLS10	Points
1	(Germany) No. 444 Adrenalin Motorsport Team Mainhattan Wheels	Porsche Cayman CM12	4	3	Ret	1	1	1	2	2	Ret	2	236
2	(Germany) No. 445 Taxi-Arbinger-Racing by rent2Drive	Porsche Cayman CM12	2	4	3	3	3						125
Non-championship entries
—	(Germany) No. 440 QTQ Raceperformance	Porsche Cayman CM12	1	1	1				1	Ret	1	1	(210)
—	(Germany) No. 447 tm-racing.org	Porsche Cayman CM12		2				2			2	3	(109)
—	(Germany) No. 448 tm-racing.org	Porsche Cayman CM12	3	5	2						3		(98)
—	(Germany) No. 456 (No Entry Name)	Porsche Cayman CM12		DNS					3	1	Ret	4	(82)
—	No. 455 (No Entry Name)	Porsche Cayman CM12				2	2						(56)
Pos.	Team	Vehicle	NLS1	NLS2	NLS3	24H-Q		NLS6	NLS7	NLS8	NLS9	NLS10	Points

‡: Result not counted for classification

Colour	Result
Gold	Winner
Silver	Second place
Bronze	Third place
Green	Points classification
Blue	Non-points classification
Blue	Non-classified finish (NC)
Purple	Retired, not classified (Ret)
Red	Did not qualify (DNQ)
Red	Did not pre-qualify (DNPQ)
Black	Disqualified (DSQ)
White	Did not start (DNS)
White	Withdrew (WD)
White	Race cancelled (C)
Blank	Did not practice (DNP)
Blank	Did not arrive (DNA)
Blank	Excluded (EX)

===== VT3 =====
Pos.	Team	Vehicle	NLS1	NLS2	NLS3	24H-Q	NLS6	NLS7	NLS8	NLS9	NLS10	Points
1	(Germany) No. 460 Keeevin Sports and Racing	BMW 335i (G20)	1	NC	DNS		1	1	1	1		175
Pos.	Team	Vehicle	NLS1	NLS2	NLS3	24H-Q	NLS6	NLS7	NLS8	NLS9	NLS10	Points

‡: Result not counted for classification

Colour	Result
Gold	Winner
Silver	Second place
Bronze	Third place
Green	Points classification
Blue	Non-points classification
Blue	Non-classified finish (NC)
Purple	Retired, not classified (Ret)
Red	Did not qualify (DNQ)
Red	Did not pre-qualify (DNPQ)
Black	Disqualified (DSQ)
White	Did not start (DNS)
White	Withdrew (WD)
White	Race cancelled (C)
Blank	Did not practice (DNP)
Blank	Did not arrive (DNA)
Blank	Excluded (EX)

===== VT2 =====
====== VT2-F+4WD ======
Pos.	Team	Vehicle	NLS1	NLS2	NLS3	24H-Q		NLS6	NLS7	NLS8	NLS9	NLS10	Points
1	(Germany) No. 470 Auto Thomas by Jung Motorsport	Cupra Leon (VZ)	2	4	3	4	Ret	4	3	3	2	1	232
2	(Germany) No. 480 Dupré Engineering	Audi RS 3	8	1	Ret	3	4	1	DSQ	1	1	2	229
3	(Germany) No. 467 CSRacing	Hyundai i30N	1	2	DSQ	1	Ret	3	1	2	3	Ret	211
Non-championship entries
—	(Germany) No. 494 (No Entry Name)	Volkswagen Golf 8 GTI Clubsport	Ret	3	1	2	1	7	2	5	Ret		(187)
—	(Germany) No. 471 Auto Thomas by Jung Motorsport	Cupra Leon (KL)	5			6	Ret	8	5	6	6	5	(128)
—	(Germany) No. 496 STENLE Marketing by Mertens Motorsport	Hyundai i30N	3	DNS	4			9	DNS	4	5		(101)
—	(Germany) No. 492 STENLE Marketing by Mertens Motorsport	Hyundai i30N	4					2	7	8	8		(94)
—	(Germany) No. 472 Auto Thomas by Jung Motorsport	Cupra Leon (KL)	7	5	Ret	8	2	10					(89)
—	(Germany) No. 491 STENLE Marketing by Mertens Motorsport	Hyundai i30N	Ret	Ret	Ret	Ret	WD		4	7	4	3	(85)
—	(Germany) No. 477 asBest Racing	Volkswagen Scirocco	Ret	7	5	7	WD		6	9			(82)
—	(Germany) No. 481 (No Entry Name)	Renault Mégane III RS		8	8				NC	Ret	7	4	(66)
—	(Germany) No. 466 Walkenhorst Motorsport	Hyundai i30N	6	6	2			Ret					(64)
—	(Germany) No. 488 SRS Team Sorg Rennsport	BMW 128ti				5	3					DNS	(45)
—	(Germany) No. 482 Dupré Engineering	Audi RS 3						5					(20)
—	(Germany) No. 475 asBest Racing	Volkswagen Scirocco			6								(18)
—	No. 474 (No Entry Name)	Volkswagen Golf VII						6					(18)
—	(Germany) No. 486 Team HAL	Hyundai i30N Fastback			7								(16)
—	(Germany) No. 499 Keeevin Sports and Racing	Renault Mégane III RS	Ret										—
—	(Germany) No. 490 Keeevin Sports and Racing	Renault Mégane III RS									Ret		—
Pos.	Team	Vehicle	NLS1	NLS2	NLS3	24H-Q		NLS6	NLS7	NLS8	NLS9	NLS10	Points

‡: Result not counted for classification

Colour	Result
Gold	Winner
Silver	Second place
Bronze	Third place
Green	Points classification
Blue	Non-points classification
Blue	Non-classified finish (NC)
Purple	Retired, not classified (Ret)
Red	Did not qualify (DNQ)
Red	Did not pre-qualify (DNPQ)
Black	Disqualified (DSQ)
White	Did not start (DNS)
White	Withdrew (WD)
White	Race cancelled (C)
Blank	Did not practice (DNP)
Blank	Did not arrive (DNA)
Blank	Excluded (EX)

====== VT2-RWD ======
Pos.	Team	Vehicle	NLS1	NLS2	NLS3	24H-Q		NLS6	NLS7	NLS8	NLS9	NLS10	Points
1	(Germany) No. 500 Adrenalin Motorsport Team Mainhattan Wheels	BMW 330i (G20)	1	1	Ret	2	1	2	1	1	1	3	291
2	(Germany) No. 514 SRS Team Sorg Rennsport	BMW 330i (G20)	3	4	3	3	7	8	5	4	6	7	203
3	(Germany) No. 504 SRS Team Sorg Rennsport	BMW 330i (G20)	2	2	1	Ret	WD	Ret	3	2	2	2	200
4	(Germany) No. 501 Adrenalin Motorsport Team Mainhattan Wheels	BMW 330i (G20)	4	Ret		Ret	3	4	4	3	5	Ret	136
5	(Germany) No. 519 Team HAL	Toyota Supra (A90)		3	4			3	9	DSQ	4	5	126
Non-championship entries
—	(Germany) No. 520 Toyo Tires with Ring Racing	Toyota Supra (A90)	5		2	1	2	5	8	NC			(145)
—	(Germany) No. 515 Manheller Racing	Toyota Supra (A90)						1	2	3		1	(123)
—	(Singapore) No. 502 Giti Tire Motorsport by WS Racing	BMW 330i (G20)	6	7	Ret	6	4	7			10	6	(119)
—	(Singapore) No. 506 Giti Tire Motorsport by WS Racing	BMW 330i (G20)	Ret	6	DSQ	5	6				9	8	(82)
—	(Germany) No. 508 MSC Adenau e.V. im ADAC	BMW 330i						6	10	7		4	(67)
—	(Germany) No. 512 AV Racing by Black Falcon	BMW 330i G20							6	5			(38)
—	(Germany) No. 516 Manheller Racing	BMW 328i F30							11	6			(28)
—	No. 268 (No Entry Name)	Toyota Supra (A90)				4	Ret						(22)
—	(Germany) No. 505 Time Attack Paderborn	BMW 328i (F30)		5	Ret								(20)
—	(Germany) No. 484 Teichmann Racing	Toyota Supra (A90)				Ret	5						(20)
—	No. 510 (No Entry Name)	BMW 330i (G20)		Ret				Ret	7			Ret	(16)
—	No. 503 (No Entry Name)	BMW 330i (G20)		Ret							8		(14)
Pos.	Team	Vehicle	NLS1	NLS2	NLS3	24H-Q		NLS6	NLS7	NLS8	NLS9	NLS10	Points

‡: Result not counted for classification

Colour	Result
Gold	Winner
Silver	Second place
Bronze	Third place
Green	Points classification
Blue	Non-points classification
Blue	Non-classified finish (NC)
Purple	Retired, not classified (Ret)
Red	Did not qualify (DNQ)
Red	Did not pre-qualify (DNPQ)
Black	Disqualified (DSQ)
White	Did not start (DNS)
White	Withdrew (WD)
White	Race cancelled (C)
Blank	Did not practice (DNP)
Blank	Did not arrive (DNA)
Blank	Excluded (EX)

===== BMW M240i =====
Pos.	Team	NLS1	NLS2	NLS3	24H-Q		NLS6	NLS7	NLS8	NLS9	NLS10	Points
1	(Germany) No. 1 Adrenalin Motorsport Team Mainhattan Wheels	1	1	1	1	1	1	Ret	Ret	6	1	263
1	(Germany) No. 680 PTerting Sports by Up2Race	5	3	5	8	2	2	1	2	1	3	258
3	(Germany) No. 651 Adrenalin Motorsport Team Mainhattan Wheels	3	2	7	4	3	6	2	4	2	2	240
4	(Germany) No. 652 Adrenalin Motorsport Team Mainhattan Wheels	6	Ret	9	3	4	5	4	5	3	5	184
Non-championship entries
—	(Singapore) No. 665 Giti Tire Motorsport by WS Racing	Ret	Ret	4	Ret	WD	Ret	6	3	5	4	(107)
—	(Germany) No. 653 Adrenalin Motorsport Team Mainhattan Wheels			11	2	7	3			4		(101)
—	(United Kingdom) No. 667 Breakell Racing			10				3	1	7		(87)
—	(Germany) No. 670 PTerting Sports by Up2Race	2	4	2								(78)
—	(Switzerland) No. 677 (No Entry Name)			12	5	WD		5	6			(67)
—	(Germany) No. 671 PTerting Sports by Up2Race			3	6	5						(63)
—	(Belgium) No. 658 JJ Motorsport	4		8								(36)
—	(Germany) No. 681 PTerting Sports by Up2Race				7	6						(34)
—	(Germany) No. 664 (No Entry Name)						4	Ret	Ret			(22)
—	(Germany) No. 660 Keeevin Sports and Racing		Ret	6								(18)
—	(Germany) No. 655 SR Motorsport by Schnitzelalm										6	(18)
—	(Germany) No. 669 Keeevin Sports and Racing	7										(16)
Pos.	Team	NLS1	NLS2	NLS3	24H-Q		NLS6	NLS7	NLS8	NLS9	NLS10	Points

‡: Result not counted for classification

Colour	Result
Gold	Winner
Silver	Second place
Bronze	Third place
Green	Points classification
Blue	Non-points classification
Blue	Non-classified finish (NC)
Purple	Retired, not classified (Ret)
Red	Did not qualify (DNQ)
Red	Did not pre-qualify (DNPQ)
Black	Disqualified (DSQ)
White	Did not start (DNS)
White	Withdrew (WD)
White	Race cancelled (C)
Blank	Did not practice (DNP)
Blank	Did not arrive (DNA)
Blank	Excluded (EX)

===== BMW 325i =====
Pos.	Team	NLS1	NLS2	NLS3	24H-Q		NLS6	NLS7	NLS8	NLS9	NLS10	Points
1	(Germany) No. 111 JS Competition	1	3	Ret	2	2	2	2	2	Ret	2‡	200 (228)
2	(Germany) No. 700 Team ifb by rent2Drive	3	4	Ret								47
3	(Germany) No. 112 rent2Drive-racing	5‡	Ret	NC	4	4	4‡	6‡		2‡		44 (132)
4	(Germany) No. 116 Dr.Dr. Stein Tveten motorsport	Ret	2	Ret								28
Non-championship entries
—	(Germany) No. 107 SRS Team Sorg Rennsport	4	1	1	1	1	1	1	1	1	1	(337)
—	(Germany) No. 130 Keeevin Sports and Racing	2	5	2	3	3	3	3	3	3	4	(248)
—	(Germany) No. 101 EiFelkind Racing		Ret	Ret			6	5	4	4		(82)
—	(Germany) No. 121 JS Competition						5			Ret	3	(45)
—	No. 100 (No Entry Name)				5	5						(40)
—	(Germany) No. 117 rent2Drive-racing						7	4	Ret			(38)
—	(Germany) No. 120 Keeevin Sports and Racing										5	(20)
—	(Germany) No. 118 tm-racing.org			Ret								—
—	(Germany) No. 123 Keeevin Sports and Racing						Ret					—
Pos.	Team	NLS1	NLS2	NLS3	24H-Q		NLS6	NLS7	NLS8	NLS9	NLS10	Points

‡: Result not counted for classification

Colour	Result
Gold	Winner
Silver	Second place
Bronze	Third place
Green	Points classification
Blue	Non-points classification
Blue	Non-classified finish (NC)
Purple	Retired, not classified (Ret)
Red	Did not qualify (DNQ)
Red	Did not pre-qualify (DNPQ)
Black	Disqualified (DSQ)
White	Did not start (DNS)
White	Withdrew (WD)
White	Race cancelled (C)
Blank	Did not practice (DNP)
Blank	Did not arrive (DNA)
Blank	Excluded (EX)

=== Porsche Endurance Trophy Nurburgring ===
==== Drivers' Standings ====
===== Cup 2 =====
====== Overall ======
Pos.	Driver	Team	NLS1	NLS2	NLS3	NLS6	NLS7	NLS8	NLS9	NLS10	Points
1	(Germany) Arne Hoffmeister (Germany) David Jahn (Germany) Tim Scheerbarth	(Belgium) No. 921 Mühlner Motorsport	1^{P}	1^{P}	1	1	2^{F}	2^{P}	1^{F}	1	169
2	(Germany) Tobias Müller (Germany) Noah Nagelsdiek (Luxembourg) Carlos Rivas	(Germany) No. 948 48 LOSCH Motorsport by Black Falcon	2	2	2^{PF}	2^{PF}	1^{P}	1^{F}	2	Ret^{PF}	141.5
3	(Germany) Fabio Grosse (Switzerland) Patrik Grütter	(Germany) No. 901 SRS Team Sorg Rennsport	3^{F}	12^{F}	5	5	3	3	3	2	111.5
4	(Germany) Alexander Hardt (United States) Peter Ludwig (Germany) Maik Rosenberg	(Germany) No. 900 BLACK FALCON Team ZIMMERMANN	4	4	4	6	4	4	5	3	106
5	(Germany) Fidel Leib (Germany) Tobias Vazquez-Garcia	(Germany) No. 909 KKrämer Racing						5	4	5	77.5
5	(Germany) Fidel Leib (Germany) Tobias Vazquez-Garcia	(Germany) No. 929 KKrämer Racing	Ret	3	10	4	Ret				77.5
6	(Germany) Alex Koch (Germany) Niklas Koch	(Germany) No. 910 Smyrlis Racing	6	10	6	10	6	7	7	6	74
7	(Germany) Klaus Koch	(Germany) No. 910 Smyrlis Racing	6	10		10	6	7	7	6	64
8	(Germany) Michele di Martino	(Germany) No. 909 KKrämer Racing	DSQ	6	3		8	5			63.5
8	(Germany) Michele di Martino	(Germany) No. 929 KKrämer Racing				4					63.5
9	(Slovakia) Antal Zsigo	(Belgium) No. 904 Mühlner Motorsport	7	7	8		5	Ret	9	7	55
10	(Germany) Robin Chrzanowski (Germany) Kersten Jodexnis	(Germany) No. 919 ClickversicherungTeam	DSQ	5	9	8	NC	6	6		50
11	(Germany) Karsten Krämer	(Germany) No. 909 KKrämer Racing				7	8			5	49.5
11	(Germany) Karsten Krämer	(Germany) No. 912 KKrämer Racing	5	Ret	13						49.5
12	(Ukraine) Oleksiy Kikireshko	(Germany) No. 901 SRS Team Sorg Rennsport	3^{F}	12^{F}	5						45
12	(Ukraine) Oleksiy Kikireshko	(Germany) No. 917 Raceworxx Automotive				12			12^{P}		45
12	(Ukraine) Oleksiy Kikireshko	(Germany) No. 905 PTerting Sports by Up2Race								4‡	45
13	(Germany) Christopher Brück	(Germany) No. 909 KKrämer Racing	DSQ	6	3						44.5
13	(Germany) Christopher Brück	(Germany) No. 929 KKrämer Racing				4	Ret				44.5
14	(France) Leo Messenger	(Germany) No. 909 KKrämer Racing				7			4	5	39.5
14	(France) Leo Messenger	(Germany) No. 929 KKrämer Racing					Ret				39.5
15	(Germany) Ralf-Peter Bonk (Netherlands) Marco van Ramshorst	(Germany) No. 906 pb performance	WD	9	12	9			10	8	38.5
16	(Germany) Marcel Hoppe	(Belgium) No. 904 Mühlner Motorsport	7		8				9		34
17	(Germany) Peter Sander	(Germany) No. 909 KKrämer Racing				7	8	5			32.5
18	(Germany) Ben Bünnagel	(Belgium) No. 904 Mühlner Motorsport				3			9		30.5
19	(Germany) Peter Scharmach	(Germany) No. 919 ClickversicherungTeam	DSQ	5	9		NC	6			28
20	(United Kingdom) Bill Cameron (United Kingdom) Jim Cameron	(United Kingdom) No. 913 Team Cameron	Ret		DNS		7	8	11		23
21	(Germany) Janis Waldow (Ukraine) Ivan Peklin	(Belgium) No. 904 Mühlner Motorsport				3					22.5
22	(Estonia) Martin Rump	(Belgium) No. 904 Mühlner Motorsport		7			5	Ret			20
23	(Netherlands) Tom Coronel (Netherlands) Jan Jaap van Roon	(Germany) No. 927 Max Kruse Racing	WD	8	7				Ret		17
24	(Germany) Sascha Steinhardt	(Germany) No. 912 KKrämer Racing	5	Ret	13						15
25	(Germany) Florian Naumann	(Germany) No. 909 KKrämer Racing				7					13.5
26	(Germany) Richard-Sven Karl Jodexnis	(Germany) No. 919 ClickversicherungTeam				8					12
27	(Germany) Tim Heinemann	(Germany) No. 917 Raceworxx Automotive				12			12^{P}		12
28	(Netherlands) Jeroen Bleekemolen	(Belgium) No. 904 Mühlner Motorsport					5	Ret			11
28	(Germany) Ioannis Smyrlis	(Germany) No. 910 Smyrlis Racing								6	11
29	(Germany) Felipe Fernández Laser	(Belgium) No. 904 Mühlner Motorsport								7	10
30	(Germany) Michael Rebhan	(Belgium) No. 904 Mühlner Motorsport	7								9
30	(Netherlands) Rudy van Buren	(Germany) No. 927 Max Kruse Racing			7						9
30	(Germany) Jürgen Oehler	(Germany) No. 910 Smyrlis Racing				10					9
31	(Germany) Nick Salewsky	(Belgium) No. 904 Mühlner Motorsport			8						8
32	(Germany) Georg Goder (Germany) Ralf Oehme (Germany) Martin Schlüter	(Germany) No. 920 9und11 Racing				11					7.5
33	(Germany) Alexander Fielenbach	(Germany) No. 917 Raceworxx Automotive				12					6
34	(Germany) Nico Bastian	(Germany) No. 917 Raceworxx Automotive							12^{P}		6
34	(Germany) Nico Bastian	(Germany) No. 905 PTerting Sports by Up2Race								4‡	6
35	(United States) Ace Robey	(Germany) No. 912 KKrämer Racing			13						4
Non-championship entries
—	(United States) Ryan Harrison (Romania) Alexandru Vasilescu (Germany) Leon Wassertheurer	(Germany) No. 902 AV Racing by Black Falcon							8		—
—	(Sweden) Niclas Jönsson (United States) Tracy Krohn	(Germany) No. 935 RPM Racing		NC	11						—
—	(Germany) Marius Kiefer (Germany) Stefan Kiefer (Austria) Luca Rettenbacher	(Germany) No. 930 Sante Royale Racing Team		11							—
Pos.	Driver	Team	NLS1	NLS2	NLS3	NLS6	NLS7	NLS8	NLS9	NLS10	Points

‡: Result not counted for classification

Colour	Result
Gold	Winner
Silver	Second place
Bronze	Third place
Green	Points classification
Blue	Non-points classification
Blue	Non-classified finish (NC)
Purple	Retired, not classified (Ret)
Red	Did not qualify (DNQ)
Red	Did not pre-qualify (DNPQ)
Black	Disqualified (DSQ)
White	Did not start (DNS)
White	Withdrew (WD)
White	Race cancelled (C)
Blank	Did not practice (DNP)
Blank	Did not arrive (DNA)
Blank	Excluded (EX)

====== Pro-Am ======
Pos.	Driver	Team	NLS1	NLS2	NLS3	NLS6	NLS7	NLS8	NLS9	NLS10	Points
1	(Germany) Alexander Hardt (United States) Peter Ludwig (Germany) Maik Rosenberg	(Germany) No. 900 BLACK FALCON Team ZIMMERMANN	4	4	4	6	4	4	5	3	156.5
2	(Germany) Fabio Grosse	(Germany) No. 901 SRS Team Sorg Rennsport	3	12	5	5	3	3			118
3	(Germany) Alex Koch (Germany) Niklas Koch	(Germany) No. 910 Smyrlis Racing	6	10	6	10	6	7	7	6	116
4	(Germany) Klaus Koch	(Germany) No. 910 Smyrlis Racing	6	10		10	6	7	7	6	101
5	(Germany) Robin Chrzanowski (Germany) Kersten Jodexnis	(Germany) No. 919 ClickversicherungTeam	DSQ	5	9	8	NC	6	6		79.5
6	(Germany) Ralf-Peter Bonk (Netherlands) Marco van Ramshorst	(Germany) No. 906 pb performance	WD	9	12	9			10	8	69.5
7	(Ukraine) Oleksiy Kikireshko	(Germany) No. 901 SRS Team Sorg Rennsport	3	12	5						60
7	(Ukraine) Oleksiy Kikireshko	(Germany) No. 917 Raceworxx Automotive				12					60
8	(Germany) Karsten Krämer	(Germany) No. 909 KKrämer Racing				7	8				57.5
8	(Germany) Karsten Krämer	(Germany) No. 912 KKrämer Racing	5	Ret	13						57.5
9	(Germany) Peter Scharmach	(Germany) No. 919 ClickversicherungTeam	DSQ	5	9		NC	6			43
10	(United Kingdom) Bill Cameron (United Kingdom) Jim Cameron	(United Kingdom) No. 913 Team Cameron	Ret		DNS		7	8	11		35
11	(Germany) Peter Sander	(Germany) No. 909 KKrämer Racing				7	8				33.5
12	(Germany) Sascha Steinhardt	(Germany) No. 912 KKrämer Racing	5	Ret	13						24
13	(Germany) Florian Naumann	(Germany) No. 909 KKrämer Racing				7					22.5
14	(Germany) Richard-Sven Karl Jodexnis	(Germany) No. 919 ClickversicherungTeam				8					19.5
15	(Germany) Ioannis Smyrlis	(Germany) No. 910 Smyrlis Racing								6	17
16	(Germany) Jürgen Oehler	(Germany) No. 910 Smyrlis Racing				10					15
17	(Germany) Georg Goder (Germany) Ralf Oehme (Germany) Martin Schlüter	(Germany) No. 920 9und11 Racing				11					13.5
18	(Netherlands) Tom Coronel (Netherlands) Jan Jaap van Roon	(Germany) No. 927 Max Kruse Racing	WD	NC	7				Ret		13
18	(Netherlands) Rudy van Buren	(Germany) No. 927 Max Kruse Racing			7						13
19	(Germany) Tim Heinemann (Germany) Alexander Fielenbach	(Germany) No. 917 Raceworxx Automotive				12					12
20	(Germany) Michele di Martino	(Germany) No. 909 KKrämer Racing					8				11
21	(United States) Ace Robey	(Germany) No. 912 KKrämer Racing			13						9
Pos.	Driver	Team	NLS1	NLS2	NLS3	NLS6	NLS7	NLS8	NLS9	NLS10	Points

‡: Result not counted for classification

Colour	Result
Gold	Winner
Silver	Second place
Bronze	Third place
Green	Points classification
Blue	Non-points classification
Blue	Non-classified finish (NC)
Purple	Retired, not classified (Ret)
Red	Did not qualify (DNQ)
Red	Did not pre-qualify (DNPQ)
Black	Disqualified (DSQ)
White	Did not start (DNS)
White	Withdrew (WD)
White	Race cancelled (C)
Blank	Did not practice (DNP)
Blank	Did not arrive (DNA)
Blank	Excluded (EX)

====== Am ======
Pos.	Driver	Team	NLS1	NLS2	NLS3	NLS6	NLS7	NLS8	NLS9	NLS10	Points
1	(Germany) Alex Koch (Germany) Niklas Koch	(Germany) No. 910 Smyrlis Racing	6	10	6	10	6	7	7	6	148.5
2	(Germany) Klaus Koch	(Germany) No. 910 Smyrlis Racing	6	10		10	6	7	7	6	128.5
3	(Germany) Robin Chrzanowski (Germany) Kersten Jodexnis	(Germany) No. 919 ClickversicherungTeam	DSQ	5	9	8	NC	6	6		107
4	(Germany) Ralf-Peter Bonk (Netherlands) Marco van Ramshorst	(Germany) No. 906 pb performance	WD	9	12	9			10	8	89.5
5	(Germany) Peter Scharmach	(Germany) No. 919 ClickversicherungTeam	DSQ	5	9		NC	6			57
6	(United Kingdom) Bill Cameron (United Kingdom) Jim Cameron	(United Kingdom) No. 913 Team Cameron	Ret		DNS		7	8	11		45
7	(Germany) Karsten Krämer (Germany) Sascha Steinhardt	(Germany) No. 912 KKrämer Racing	5	Ret	13						33
8	(Germany) Richard-Sven Karl Jodexnis	(Germany) No. 919 ClickversicherungTeam				8					30
9	(Germany) Jürgen Oehler	(Germany) No. 910 Smyrlis Racing				10					22.5
10	(Germany) Georg Goder (Germany) Ralf Oehme (Germany) Martin Schlüter	(Germany) No. 920 9und11 Racing				11					19.5
11	(United States) Ace Robey	(Germany) No. 912 KKrämer Racing			13						13
Pos.	Driver	Team	NLS1	NLS2	NLS3	NLS6	NLS7	NLS8	NLS9	NLS10	Points

‡: Result not counted for classification

Colour	Result
Gold	Winner
Silver	Second place
Bronze	Third place
Green	Points classification
Blue	Non-points classification
Blue	Non-classified finish (NC)
Purple	Retired, not classified (Ret)
Red	Did not qualify (DNQ)
Red	Did not pre-qualify (DNPQ)
Black	Disqualified (DSQ)
White	Did not start (DNS)
White	Withdrew (WD)
White	Race cancelled (C)
Blank	Did not practice (DNP)
Blank	Did not arrive (DNA)
Blank	Excluded (EX)

===== Cup 3 =====
====== Overall ======
Pos.	Driver	Team	NLS1	NLS2	NLS3	NLS6	NLS7	NLS8	NLS9	NLS10	Points
1	(Germany) Joshua Bednarski (Germany) Lorenz Stegmann	(Germany) No. 962 W&S Motorsport	13	Ret	1^{F}	1	2	3	1^{P}	1^{F}	128
2	(Germany) Horst Baumann (Germany) Markus Schmickler (Germany) Stefan Schmickler	(Germany) No. 950 Schmickler Performance powered by Ravenol	3	6	3	3	5	2	4	13	107.5
3	(Germany) Leonard Oehme (Germany) Moritz Oehme	(Germany) No. 944 Team 9und11	DSQ	4	Ret	2	3	1	3	3	103.5
4	(Germany) Heiko Eichenberg (United Kingdom) Harley Haughton	(Germany) No. 959 SRS Team Sorg Rennsport	1^{P}	1	DNS	8^{P}	1^{PF}	Ret^{PF}	2	Ret^{P}	96
5	(Germany) Nick Deißler (Germany) Stefan Kruse (Germany) Aaron Wenisch	(Germany) No. 941 Adrenalin Motorsport Team Mainhattan Wheels	5	8	5	5	6	4	5	4	93.5
6	(Germany) Kai Riemer	(Belgium) No. 939 Mühlner Motorsport								2	73
6	(Germany) Kai Riemer	(Germany) No. 962 W&S Motorsport	13	Ret	1^{F}		2	3			73
7	(United Kingdom) Joshua Hislop	(Germany) No. 949 SRS Team Sorg Rennsport				6					69
7	(United Kingdom) Joshua Hislop	(Germany) No. 969 SRS Team Sorg Rennsport	4	7	7		Ret	5	Ret	5	69
8	(Germany) Jan-Niklas Stieler	(Germany) No. 949 SRS Team Sorg Rennsport	9			6					63
8	(Germany) Jan-Niklas Stieler	(Germany) No. 969 SRS Team Sorg Rennsport		7	7		Ret	5	Ret	5	63
9	(Germany) René Höber (Germany) Richard-Sven Karl Jodexnis (Germany) Christoph Krombach	(Germany) No. 982 W&S Motorsport	6	10	9	10	9	6	7	Ret	60
10	(Germany) Janis Waldow	(Belgium) No. 939 Mühlner Motorsport	10	3	2		11	8			59
10	(Germany) Janis Waldow	(Thailand) No. 945 Renazzo Motorsport Team								9	59
11	(Germany) Tim Lukas Müller	(Germany) No. 940 Adrenalin Motorsport Team Mainhattan Wheels								12	57.5
11	(Germany) Tim Lukas Müller	(Germany) No. 949 SRS Team Sorg Rennsport							8		57.5
11	(Germany) Tim Lukas Müller	(Germany) No. 977 EiFelkind Racing	7	Ret	10	9	8	7			57.5
12	(Germany) Franz Linden (Germany) Rüdiger Schicht	(Germany) No. 955 Team Speedworxx	15	5	14^{P}	4	Ret	Ret	6^{F}	8	56.5
13	(Norway) Oskar Sandberg	(Germany) No. 940 Adrenalin Motorsport Team Mainhattan Wheels	2^{F}	2^{PF}	Ret	Ret^{F}	4	Ret		12	56
14	(Sweden) Tommy Gräberg	(Germany) No. 969 SRS Team Sorg Rennsport	4	7	7		Ret	5	Ret	5	54
15	(Latvia) Kasparas Vingilis	(Germany) No. 949 SRS Team Sorg Rennsport		9	4	6	Ret	Ret	8	6	53
16	(United States) Nico Silva	(Germany) No. 940 Adrenalin Motorsport Team Mainhattan Wheels	2^{F}	2^{PF}	Ret	Ret^{F}	4	Ret			51
17	(Germany) Alexander Fielenbach	(Germany) No. 955 Team Speedworxx	15	5	14^{P}	4	Ret	Ret	6^{F}		48.5
18	(Germany) Stefan Beyer	(Germany) No. 949 SRS Team Sorg Rennsport	9	9	4		Ret	Ret	8	6	45
19	(Germany) Yannik Himmels	(Belgium) No. 939 Mühlner Motorsport				7	11	8	Ret	2	44.5
20	(Germany) Desiree Müller	(Germany) No. 977 EiFelkind Racing	7	Ret	10	9	8	7			44.5
21	(Austria) Bernhard Wagner	(Germany) No. 949 SRS Team Sorg Rennsport	9							6	42.5
21	(Austria) Bernhard Wagner	(Germany) No. 969 SRS Team Sorg Rennsport				11					42.5
21	(Austria) Bernhard Wagner	(Germany) No. 979 SRS Team Sorg Rennsport		13	11		13	11			42.5
22	(Germany) Kim Berwanger (Germany) Christian Kohlhaas	(Germany) No. 966 asBest Racing	11	11	8	Ret	16	10	11	7	42
23	(Austria) David Griessner	(Germany) No. 940 Adrenalin Motorsport Team Mainhattan Wheels	2^{F}	2^{PF}	Ret	Ret^{F}					38
24	(Germany) Heinz Dolfen	(Germany) No. 966 asBest Racing	11	11		Ret	16	10	11	7	33
25	(Germany) Nico Bastian	(Belgium) No. 939 Mühlner Motorsport			2						32
26	(Germany) Oliver Kunz (Germany) Peter Siebert	(Germany) No. 961 W&S Motorsport	WD	14	12	14	12		9	10	29.5
27	(Belgium) Aris Balanian	(Belgium) No. 939 Mühlner Motorsport				7	11	8			27.5
28	(Germany) Otto Klohs	(Thailand) No. 945 Renazzo Motorsport Team	8	12			10	9			26
29	(Germany) Markus Nölken	(Thailand) No. 945 Renazzo Motorsport Team	8	12		12			10		24
30	(Germany) Lion Düker	(Germany) No. 961 W&S Motorsport				14	12		9	10	22.5
31	(Switzerland) Marc Arn	(Germany) No. 977 EiFelkind Racing					8	7			18
32	(Germany) Maximilian Volz	(Germany) No. 969 SRS Team Sorg Rennsport				11					16.5
32	(Germany) Maximilian Volz	(Germany) No. 979 SRS Team Sorg Rennsport					13	11			16.5
33	(Germany) Finn Wiebelhaus	(Germany) No. 949 SRS Team Sorg Rennsport			4						16
33	(Germany) Finn Wiebelhaus	(Germany) No. 979 SRS Team Sorg Rennsport		13							16
34	(Germany) Nils Steinberg	(Thailand) No. 945 Renazzo Motorsport Team					10	9			14
35	(Germany) Christopher Rink	(Belgium) No. 939 Mühlner Motorsport				7					13.5
36	(Germany) Yannick Fübrich	(Germany) No. 940 Adrenalin Motorsport Team Mainhattan Wheels					4	Ret			13
37	(Germany) Alexander Müller	(Germany) No. 979 SRS Team Sorg Rennsport	12	13	11						13
38	(Germany) Ulrich Daniel Nölken	(Thailand) No. 945 Renazzo Motorsport Team				12			10		12
39	(Austria) Michael Fischer	(Germany) No. 977 EiFelkind Racing	7								9
39	(Germany) John Lee Schambony	(Germany) No. 966 asBest Racing			8						9
40	(Germany) Erik Braun	(Germany) No. 955 Team Speedworxx								8	8
41	(Germany) Björn Simon	(Germany) No. 949 SRS Team Sorg Rennsport		9							7
41	(Germany) Heiko Hammel	(Thailand) No. 945 Renazzo Motorsport Team								9	7
42	(Germany) Thorsten Jung	(Belgium) No. 939 Mühlner Motorsport	10								6
42	(Germany) Henning Eschweiler	(Germany) No. 979 SRS Team Sorg Rennsport			11						6
43	(Norway) Peder Saltvedt	(Germany) No. 940 Adrenalin Motorsport Team Mainhattan Wheels								12	5
44	(Germany) Christian Coen	(Germany) No. 979 SRS Team Sorg Rennsport					13				4
45	(Germany) Fabian Peitzmeier	(Germany) No. 961 W&S Motorsport		14							2
46	(Germany) Maximilian Eisberg	(Germany) No. 949 SRS Team Sorg Rennsport					Ret	Ret			0
46	(Germany) Etienne Ploenes	(Germany) No. 966 asBest Racing				Ret					0
46	(Germany) Andre Duve	(Belgium) No. 939 Mühlner Motorsport							Ret		0
Non-championship entries
—	(United States) Ryan Harrison (Switzerland) Boris Hrubesch	(Germany) No. 964 AV Racing by Black Falcon			6						—
—	(United Kingdom) Chris Lulham	(Germany) No. 980 Lionspeed GP				Ret	7				—
—	(Netherlands) Max Verstappen	(Germany) No. 980 Lionspeed GP					7				—
—	(United States) Malcolm Harrison (Luxembourg) Chester Kieffer (Netherlands) Flynt Schuring	(Germany) No. 964 AV Racing by Black Falcon								11	—
—	(France) Olivier Baharian (Germany) Carsten Kautz (Luxembourg) Gabriel Rindone	No. 956 (No Entry Name)					14	12			—
—	(Germany) Peter Sander	(Germany) No. 978 KKrämer Racing	14	15	13						—
—	(Germany) Otto Blank (Germany) Daniel Schwerfeld (Switzerland) "TAKIS"	(Germany) No. 964 AV Racing by Black Falcon					15	13			—
—	(Germany) Marco Lamsouguer	(Germany) No. 978 KKrämer Racing				13			Ret		—
—	(United Kingdom) Oliver Allwood	(Germany) No. 978 KKrämer Racing			13						—
—	(Poland) Jacek Pydys	(Germany) No. 978 KKrämer Racing				13					—
—	(Germany) Jürgen Oehler	(Germany) No. 978 KKrämer Racing	14								—
—	(Germany) John Finken	(Germany) No. 978 KKrämer Racing		15							—
—	(Belgium) Matisse Lismont (United States) Kyle Tilley	(Germany) No. 980 Lionspeed GP				Ret					—
Pos.	Driver	Team	NLS1	NLS2	NLS3	NLS6	NLS7	NLS8	NLS9	NLS10	Points

‡: Result not counted for classification

Colour	Result
Gold	Winner
Silver	Second place
Bronze	Third place
Green	Points classification
Blue	Non-points classification
Blue	Non-classified finish (NC)
Purple	Retired, not classified (Ret)
Red	Did not qualify (DNQ)
Red	Did not pre-qualify (DNPQ)
Black	Disqualified (DSQ)
White	Did not start (DNS)
White	Withdrew (WD)
White	Race cancelled (C)
Blank	Did not practice (DNP)
Blank	Did not arrive (DNA)
Blank	Excluded (EX)

====== Pro-Am ======
Pos.	Driver	Team	NLS1	NLS2	NLS3	NLS6	NLS7	NLS8	NLS9	NLS10	Points
1	(Germany) Horst Baumann (Germany) Markus Schmickler (Germany) Stefan Schmickler	(Germany) No. 950 Schmickler Performance powered by Ravenol	3	6	3	3	5	2	4	13	155
2	(Germany) Nick Deißler (Germany) Stefan Kruse (Germany) Aaron Wenisch	(Germany) No. 941 Adrenalin Motorsport Team Mainhattan Wheels	5	8	5	5	6	4	5	4	136.5
3	(United Kingdom) Joshua Hislop	(Germany) No. 949 SRS Team Sorg Rennsport				6					96.5
3	(United Kingdom) Joshua Hislop	(Germany) No. 969 SRS Team Sorg Rennsport	4	7	7		Ret	5	Ret	5	96.5
4	(Germany) Jan-Niklas Stieler	(Germany) No. 949 SRS Team Sorg Rennsport	9			6					88.5
4	(Germany) Jan-Niklas Stieler	(Germany) No. 969 SRS Team Sorg Rennsport		7	7		Ret	5	Ret	5	88.5
5	(Germany) René Höber (Germany) Richard-Sven Karl Jodexnis (Germany) Christoph Krombach	(Germany) No. 982 W&S Motorsport	6	10	9	10	9	6	7	Ret	87
6	(Germany) Franz Linden (Germany) Rüdiger Schicht	(Germany) No. 955 Team Speedworxx	15	5	14	4	Ret	Ret	6	8	83.5
7	(Germany) Tim Lukas Müller	(Germany) No. 940 Adrenalin Motorsport Team Mainhattan Wheels								12	82.5
7	(Germany) Tim Lukas Müller	(Germany) No. 949 SRS Team Sorg Rennsport							8		82.5
7	(Germany) Tim Lukas Müller	(Germany) No. 977 EiFelkind Racing	7	Ret	10	9	8	7			82.5
8	(Sweden) Tommy Gräberg	(Germany) No. 969 SRS Team Sorg Rennsport	4	7	7		Ret	5	Ret	5	77
9	(Latvia) Kasparas Vingilis	(Germany) No. 949 SRS Team Sorg Rennsport		9	4	6	Ret	Ret	8	6	73.5
10	(Germany) Alexander Fielenbach	(Germany) No. 955 Team Speedworxx	15	5	14	4	Ret	Ret	6		72.5
11	(Austria) Bernhard Wagner	(Germany) No. 949 SRS Team Sorg Rennsport	9							6	67.5
11	(Austria) Bernhard Wagner	(Germany) No. 969 SRS Team Sorg Rennsport				11					67.5
11	(Austria) Bernhard Wagner	(Germany) No. 979 SRS Team Sorg Rennsport		13	11		13	11			67.5
12	(Germany) Kim Berwanger (Germany) Christian Kohlhaas	(Germany) No. 966 asBest Racing	11	11	8	Ret	16	10	11	7	64
13	(Germany) Stefan Beyer	(Germany) No. 949 SRS Team Sorg Rennsport	9	9	4		Ret	Ret	8	6	45
14	(Germany) Desiree Müller	(Germany) No. 977 EiFelkind Racing	7	Ret	10	9	8	7			62.5
15	(Germany) Heinz Dolfen	(Germany) No. 966 asBest Racing	11	11		Ret	16	10	11	7	53
16	(Germany) Oliver Kunz (Germany) Peter Siebert	(Germany) No. 961 W&S Motorsport	WD	14	12	14	12		9	10	52.5
17	(Germany) Lion Düker	(Germany) No. 961 W&S Motorsport				14	12		9	10	39.5
18	(Germany) Markus Nölken	(Thailand) No. 945 Renazzo Motorsport Team	8	12		12			10		39
19	(Germany) Otto Klohs	(Thailand) No. 945 Renazzo Motorsport Team	8	12			10	9			38
20	(Germany) Maximilian Volz	(Germany) No. 969 SRS Team Sorg Rennsport				11					28.5
20	(Germany) Maximilian Volz	(Germany) No. 979 SRS Team Sorg Rennsport					13	11			28.5
21	(Switzerland) Marc Arn	(Germany) No. 977 EiFelkind Racing					8	7			26
22	(Germany) Finn Wiebelhaus	(Germany) No. 949 SRS Team Sorg Rennsport			4						24
22	(Germany) Finn Wiebelhaus	(Germany) No. 979 SRS Team Sorg Rennsport		13							24
23	(Germany) Alexander Müller	(Germany) No. 979 SRS Team Sorg Rennsport	12	13	11						22
24	(Germany) Ulrich Daniel Nölken	(Thailand) No. 945 Renazzo Motorsport Team				12			10		21
25	(Germany) Nils Steinberg	(Thailand) No. 945 Renazzo Motorsport Team					10	9			20
26	(Germany) Yannik Himmels	(Belgium) No. 939 Mühlner Motorsport					11	8	Ret		20
26	(Belgium) Aris Balanian (Germany) Janis Waldow	(Belgium) No. 939 Mühlner Motorsport					11	8			20
27	(Austria) Michael Fischer	(Germany) No. 977 EiFelkind Racing	7								11
27	(Germany) Björn Simon	(Germany) No. 949 SRS Team Sorg Rennsport		9							11
27	(Germany) John Lee Schambony	(Germany) No. 966 asBest Racing			8						11
27	(Germany) Erik Braun	(Germany) No. 955 Team Speedworxx								8	11
28	(Norway) Peder Saltvedt (Norway) Oskar Sandberg	(Germany) No. 940 Adrenalin Motorsport Team Mainhattan Wheels								12	9
29	(Germany) Henning Eschweiler	(Germany) No. 979 SRS Team Sorg Rennsport			11						8
29	(Germany) Christian Coen	(Germany) No. 979 SRS Team Sorg Rennsport					13				8
30	(Germany) Fabian Peitzmeier	(Germany) No. 961 W&S Motorsport		14							6
31	(Germany) Maximilian Eisberg	(Germany) No. 949 SRS Team Sorg Rennsport					Ret	Ret			0
31	(Germany) Andre Duve	(Belgium) No. 939 Mühlner Motorsport							Ret		0
Pos.	Driver	Team	NLS1	NLS2	NLS3	NLS6	NLS7	NLS8	NLS9	NLS10	Points

‡: Result not counted for classification

Colour	Result
Gold	Winner
Silver	Second place
Bronze	Third place
Green	Points classification
Blue	Non-points classification
Blue	Non-classified finish (NC)
Purple	Retired, not classified (Ret)
Red	Did not qualify (DNQ)
Red	Did not pre-qualify (DNPQ)
Black	Disqualified (DSQ)
White	Did not start (DNS)
White	Withdrew (WD)
White	Race cancelled (C)
Blank	Did not practice (DNP)
Blank	Did not arrive (DNA)
Blank	Excluded (EX)

====== Am ======
Pos.	Driver	Team	NLS1	NLS2	NLS3	NLS6	NLS7	NLS8	NLS9	NLS10	Points
1	(Germany) Nick Deißler (Germany) Stefan Kruse (Germany) Aaron Wenisch	(Germany) No. 941 Adrenalin Motorsport Team Mainhattan Wheels	5	8	5	5	6	4	5	4	161
2	(Germany) René Höber (Germany) Richard-Sven Karl Jodexnis (Germany) Christoph Krombach	(Germany) No. 982 W&S Motorsport	6	10	9	10	9	6	7	Ret	105.5
3	(Germany) Jan-Niklas Stieler	(Germany) No. 949 SRS Team Sorg Rennsport	9			6					87.5
3	(Germany) Jan-Niklas Stieler	(Germany) No. 969 SRS Team Sorg Rennsport		7	7		Ret	5	Ret		87.5
4	(Germany) Kim Berwanger (Germany) Christian Kohlhaas	(Germany) No. 966 asBest Racing	11	11	8	Ret	16	10	11	7	80
5	(Germany) Desiree Müller (Germany) Tim Lukas Müller	(Germany) No. 977 EiFelkind Racing	7	Ret	10	9	8	7			75.5
6	(Sweden) Tommy Gräberg	(Germany) No. 969 SRS Team Sorg Rennsport	4	7	7		Ret	5	Ret		72
7	(Germany) Oliver Kunz (Germany) Peter Siebert	(Germany) No. 961 W&S Motorsport	WD	14	12	14	12		9	10	68.5
8	(Germany) Heinz Dolfen	(Germany) No. 966 asBest Racing	11	11		Ret	16	10	11	7	67
9	(Austria) Bernhard Wagner	(Germany) No. 949 SRS Team Sorg Rennsport	9								63.5
9	(Austria) Bernhard Wagner	(Germany) No. 969 SRS Team Sorg Rennsport				11					63.5
9	(Austria) Bernhard Wagner	(Germany) No. 979 SRS Team Sorg Rennsport		13	11		13	11			63.5
10	(Germany) Lion Düker	(Germany) No. 961 W&S Motorsport				14	12		9	10	52.5
11	(Germany) Markus Nölken	(Thailand) No. 945 Renazzo Motorsport Team	8	12		12			10		49
12	(Germany) Stefan Beyer	(Germany) No. 949 SRS Team Sorg Rennsport	9	9	4		Ret	Ret			45
13	(Germany) Otto Klohs	(Thailand) No. 945 Renazzo Motorsport Team	8	12			10	9			45
14	(Germany) Maximilian Volz	(Germany) No. 969 SRS Team Sorg Rennsport				11					35.5
14	(Germany) Maximilian Volz	(Germany) No. 979 SRS Team Sorg Rennsport					13	11			35.5
15	(Switzerland) Marc Arn	(Germany) No. 977 EiFelkind Racing					8	7			30
16	(Germany) Finn Wiebelhaus	(Germany) No. 949 SRS Team Sorg Rennsport			4						29
16	(Germany) Finn Wiebelhaus	(Germany) No. 979 SRS Team Sorg Rennsport		13							29
17	(Germany) Ulrich Daniel Nölken	(Thailand) No. 945 Renazzo Motorsport Team				12			10		28
18	(Germany) Alexander Müller	(Germany) No. 979 SRS Team Sorg Rennsport	12	13	11						26
19	(Germany) Nils Steinberg	(Thailand) No. 945 Renazzo Motorsport Team					10	9			24
20	(Germany) Björn Simon	(Germany) No. 949 SRS Team Sorg Rennsport		9							15
20	(Germany) Erik Braun (Germany) Franz Linden (Germany) Rüdiger Schicht	(Germany) No. 955 Team Speedworxx								8	15
21	(Austria) Michael Fischer	(Germany) No. 977 EiFelkind Racing	7								13
21	(Germany) John Lee Schambony	(Germany) No. 966 asBest Racing			8						13
22	(Germany) Christian Coen	(Germany) No. 979 SRS Team Sorg Rennsport					13				10
23	(Germany) Henning Eschweiler	(Germany) No. 979 SRS Team Sorg Rennsport			11						9
24	(Germany) Fabian Peitzmeier	(Germany) No. 961 W&S Motorsport		14							8
25	(Germany) Etienne Ploenes	(Germany) No. 966 asBest Racing				Ret					0
Pos.	Driver	Team	NLS1	NLS2	NLS3	NLS6	NLS7	NLS8	NLS9	NLS10	Points

‡: Result not counted for classification

Colour	Result
Gold	Winner
Silver	Second place
Bronze	Third place
Green	Points classification
Blue	Non-points classification
Blue	Non-classified finish (NC)
Purple	Retired, not classified (Ret)
Red	Did not qualify (DNQ)
Red	Did not pre-qualify (DNPQ)
Black	Disqualified (DSQ)
White	Did not start (DNS)
White	Withdrew (WD)
White	Race cancelled (C)
Blank	Did not practice (DNP)
Blank	Did not arrive (DNA)
Blank	Excluded (EX)

==== Teams' Standings ====
===== Cup 2 =====
Pos.	Team	NLS1	NLS2	NLS3	NLS6	NLS7	NLS8	NLS9	NLS10	Points
1	(Belgium) No. 921 Mühlner Motorsport	1^{P}	1^{P}	1	1	2^{F}	2^{P}	1^{F}	1	169
2	(Germany) No. 948 48 LOSCH Motorsport by Black Falcon	2	2	2^{PF}	2^{PF}	1^{P}	1^{F}	2	Ret^{PF}	141.5
3	(Germany) No. 901 SRS Team Sorg Rennsport	3^{F}	12^{F}	5	5	3	3	3	2	111.5
4	(Germany) No. 900 BLACK FALCON Team ZIMMERMANN	4	4	4	6	4	4	5	3	106
5	(Germany) No. 909 KKrämer Racing	DSQ	6	3	7	8	5	4	5	83.5
6	(Belgium) No. 904 Mühlner Motorsport	7	7	8	3	5	Ret	9	7	77.5
7	(Germany) No. 910 Smyrlis Racing	6	10	6	10	6	7	7	6	74
8	(Germany) No. 919 ClickversicherungTeam	DSQ	5	9	8	NC	6	6		50
9	(Germany) No. 929 KKrämer Racing	Ret	3	10	4	Ret				40.5
10	(Germany) No. 906 pb performance	WD	9	12	9			10	8	38.5
11	(United Kingdom) No. 913 Team Cameron	Ret		DNS		7	8	11		24
12	(Germany) No. 927 Max Kruse Racing	WD	8	7				Ret		17
13	(Germany) No. 912 KKrämer Racing	5	Ret	13						15
14	(Germany) No. 917 Raceworxx Automotive				12			12^{P}		12
15	(Germany) No. 920 9und11 Racing				11					7.5
Non-championship entries
—	(Germany) No. 905 PTerting Sports by Up2Race								4	—
—	(Germany) No. 902 AV Racing by Black Falcon							8		—
—	(Germany) No. 935 RPM Racing		NC	11						—
—	(Germany) No. 930 Sante Royale Racing Team		11							—
Pos.	Team	NLS1	NLS2	NLS3	NLS6	NLS7	NLS8	NLS9	NLS10	Points

‡: Result not counted for classification

Colour	Result
Gold	Winner
Silver	Second place
Bronze	Third place
Green	Points classification
Blue	Non-points classification
Blue	Non-classified finish (NC)
Purple	Retired, not classified (Ret)
Red	Did not qualify (DNQ)
Red	Did not pre-qualify (DNPQ)
Black	Disqualified (DSQ)
White	Did not start (DNS)
White	Withdrew (WD)
White	Race cancelled (C)
Blank	Did not practice (DNP)
Blank	Did not arrive (DNA)
Blank	Excluded (EX)

===== Cup 3 =====
Pos.	Team	NLS1	NLS2	NLS3	NLS6	NLS7	NLS8	NLS9	NLS10	Points
1	(Germany) No. 962 W&S Motorsport	13	Ret	1^{F}	1	2	3	1^{P}	1^{F}	128
2	(Germany) No. 950 Schmickler Performance powered by Ravenol	3	6	3	3	5	2	4	13	107.5
3	(Germany) No. 944 Team 9und11	DSQ	4	Ret	2	3	1	3	3	103.5
4	(Germany) No. 959 SRS Team Sorg Rennsport	1^{P}	1	DNS	8^{P}	1^{PF}	Ret^{PF}	2	Ret^{P}	96
5	(Germany) No. 941 Adrenalin Motorsport Team Mainhattan Wheels	5	8	5	5	6	4	5	4	93.5
6	(Belgium) No. 939 Mühlner Motorsport	10	3	2	7	11	8	Ret	2	82.5
7	(Germany) No. 969 SRS Team Sorg Rennsport	4	7	7	11	Ret	5	Ret	5	61.5
8	(Germany) No. 949 SRS Team Sorg Rennsport	9	9	4	6	Ret	Ret	8	6	60
9	(Germany) No. 982 W&S Motorsport	6	10	9	10	9	6	7	Ret	60
10	(Germany) No. 955 Team Speedworxx	15	5	14^{P}	4	Ret	Ret	6^{F}	8	56.5
11	(Germany) No. 940 Adrenalin Motorsport Team Mainhattan Wheels	2^{F}	2^{PF}	Ret	Ret^{F}	4	Ret		12	56
12	(Thailand) No. 945 Renazzo Motorsport Team	8	12		12	10	9	10	9	45
13	(Germany) No. 977 EiFelkind Racing	7	Ret	10	9	8	7			44.5
14	(Germany) No. 966 asBest Racing	11	11	8	Ret	16	10	11	7	42
15	(Germany) No. 961 W&S Motorsport	WD	14	12	14	12		9	10	29.5
16	(Germany) No. 979 SRS Team Sorg Rennsport	12	13	11		13	11			22
Non-championship entries
—	(Germany) No. 964 AV Racing by Black Falcon			6		15	13		11	—
—	(Germany) No. 980 Lionspeed GP				Ret	7				—
—	No. 956 (No Entry Name)					14	12			—
—	(Germany) No. 978 KKrämer Racing	14	15	13	13			Ret		—
Pos.	Team	NLS1	NLS2	NLS3	NLS6	NLS7	NLS8	NLS9	NLS10	Points

‡: Result not counted for classification

Colour	Result
Gold	Winner
Silver	Second place
Bronze	Third place
Green	Points classification
Blue	Non-points classification
Blue	Non-classified finish (NC)
Purple	Retired, not classified (Ret)
Red	Did not qualify (DNQ)
Red	Did not pre-qualify (DNPQ)
Black	Disqualified (DSQ)
White	Did not start (DNS)
White	Withdrew (WD)
White	Race cancelled (C)
Blank	Did not practice (DNP)
Blank	Did not arrive (DNA)
Blank	Excluded (EX)

== See also ==
- 2025 24 Hours of Nürburgring

== Bibliography ==
- Tim Upietz & Patrik Koziolek (18 December 2025). Nürburgring Langstrecken-Serie 2025. Gruppe C Motorsport Verlag. ISBN 978-3-948501 43-3.
